= Denis Albert Bardou =

- Born: February 15, 1841; Paris, France
- Died: March 14, 1893 (aged 52); Paris, France
- Occupation: Scientific equipment optician
- Years active: 1865-1893
- Known for: Telescopes and other precision optical instruments

Denis Albert Bardou (15 February 1841 – 14 March 1893) was a French manufacturer of precision optical instruments.

== Early life ==
He was born in Paris, the son of Pierre Gabriel Bardou, optician, and Gertrude Aglaé Anna Guichard. Denis Albert's grandfather had founded the Maison Bardou in 1819, an optical company in Paris, which had then passed to his father.

== Career ==
In 1865, Denis Albert assumed control of the family business. The company was located at his residence at 55, rue de Chabrol.

The company manufactured and sold astronomical telescopes, spyglasses, binoculars, microscopes and opera glasses. The telescopes included both equatorial and azimuthal models with silvered glass mirrors (10, 16, 20 cm). Between 1867 and 1891 the Bardou company won numerous awards at expositions of Le Havre, Philadelphia, and Paris, including a gold medal at the Exposition Universelle in Paris in 1889. It furnished optical instruments to the French Ministère de la Guerre, Ministère de la Marine and to foreign governments. The Maison Bardou and its fellow Paris-based competitors the Secrétan and Mailhat companies were among the leading French precision optics manufacturers of the early twentieth century. Bardou telescopes and optical products were widely exported to Europe, the United States and further afield.

== Other activities ==
Bardou became a member of the Société astronomique de France in 1888 (only one year after it was established). Advertisements for his company's telescopes appeared frequently in the pages of the society's bulletin.

== Death and legacy ==
Bardou died on 14 March 1893 in his home in Paris.

In 1896, Jules Vial, an engineer, became the successor to the Maison Bardou. He continued manufacturing telescopes under the name “Bardou” or “Bardou-Vial” for at least the next 15 years. By 1899, the company had moved to 59, rue Caulaincourt, Paris.

== Notable telescopes ==
Besides manufacturing small telescopes, Bardou also built large ones upon request.

- When Camille Flammarion built his observatory in Juvisy-sur-Orge in 1883, he commissioned Bardou to construct the large equatorial mount refracting telescope of 240 mm diameter and 3600 mm focal length.
- In 1889, the Société Astronomique de France commissioned Bardou to build an equatorial mount refractor with a 108 mm diameter for the Observatory of the rue Serpente atop its new headquarters in the 6th arrondissement of Paris.
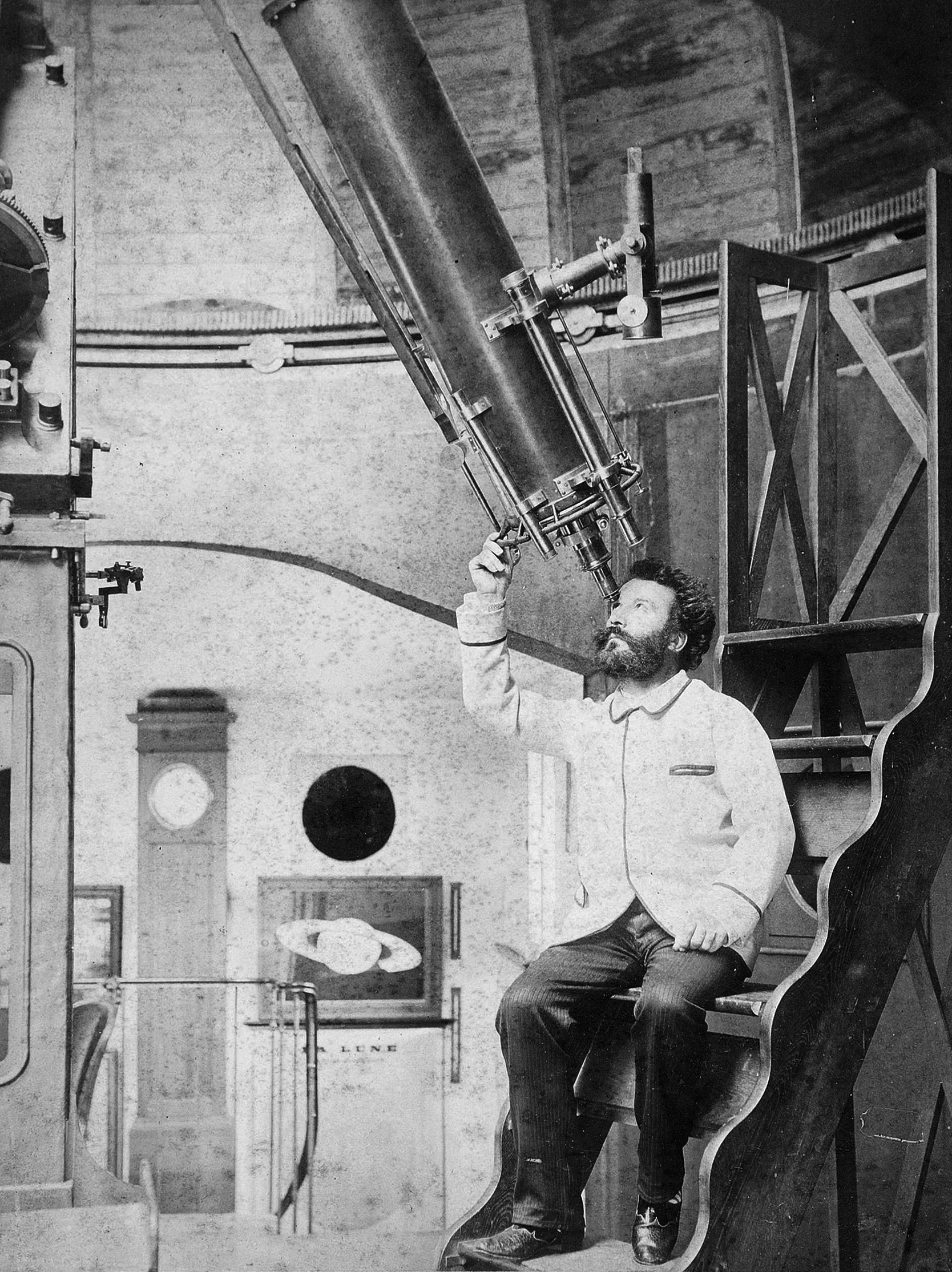
Camille Flammarion at the eyepiece of his 9½-inch Bardou refractor at his Juvisy observatory

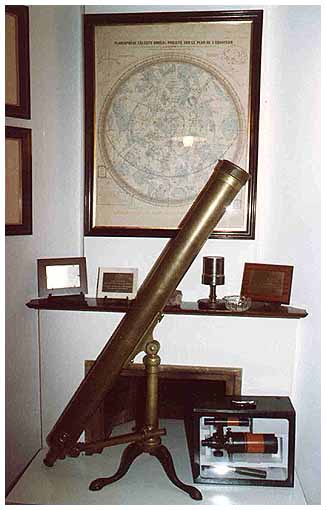
Bardou telescope that Camille Flammarion donated to the Sociedad Científica Camille Flammarion of Jaén, Spain
