= Raymond Augustin Mailhat =

Manufacturer of telescopes and precision optics

- Born: March 28, 1862; Saurat (Ariège), France
- Died: April 22, 1923 (aged 61); Montrouge (Seine), France
- Occupation: Scientific equipment optician
- Years active: 1889-1909
- Known for: Telescopes and other precision optical instruments

Raymond Augustin Jean-Baptiste Mailhat (28 March 1862 – 22 April 1923) was a French manufacturer of telescopes and precision optical instruments.

== Biography ==
Raymond Mailhat was born on 28 March 1862 in Saurat (Ariège), the son of Jean Benjamin Mailhat, an illiterate shoemaker. After studying under Paul Gautier (1842-1909), Raymond became the director of the Secrétan company’s optics workshop in Paris on 1 January 1889. In 1894, Mailhat bought part of those workshops and established his own business. The Maison Mailhat manufactured a wide variety of equipment for both scientists and amateurs:

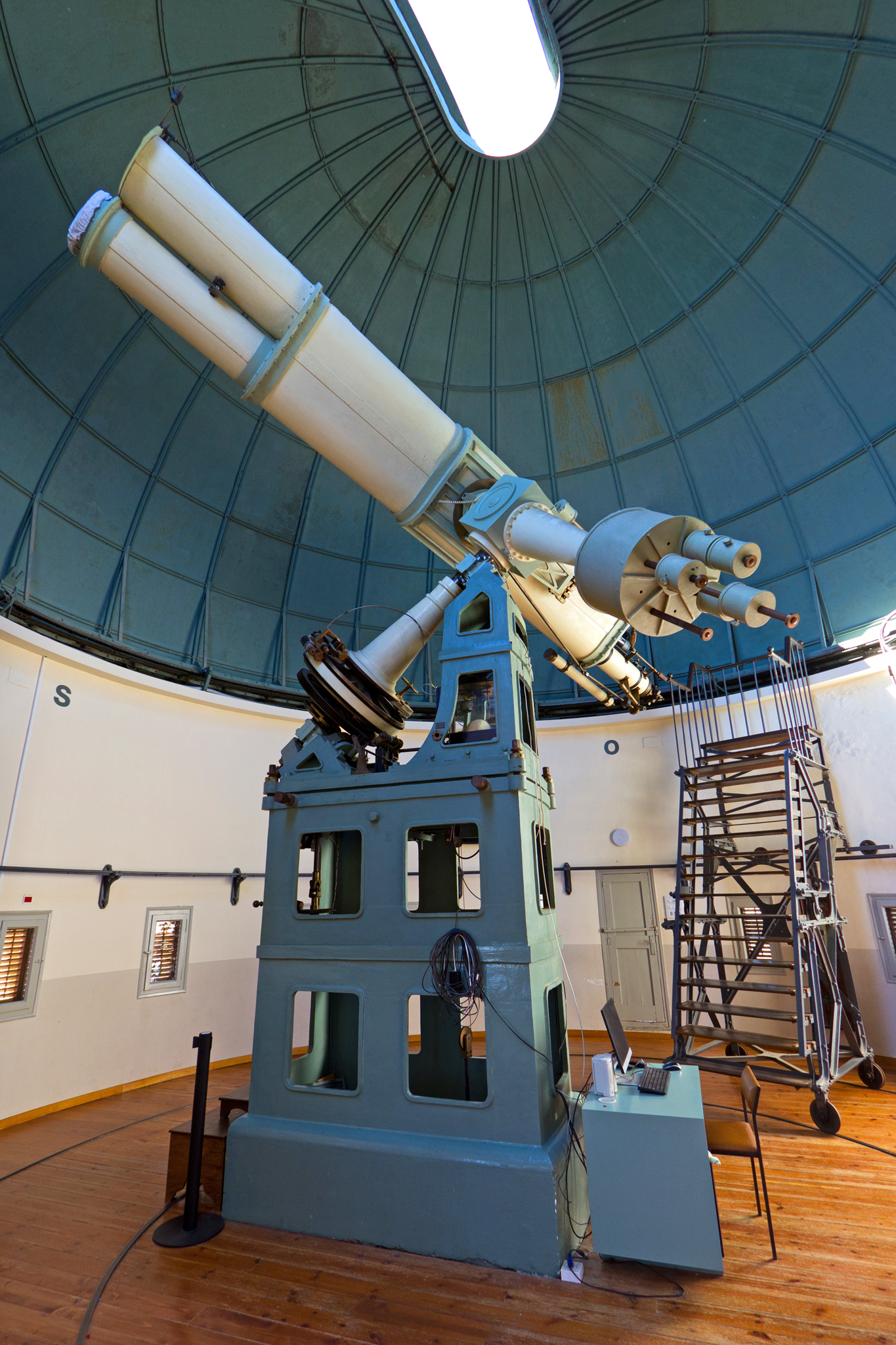
Mailhat 38 cm refracting telescope at the Fabra Observatory (telescope built in 1904)

- Astronomical and photographic lenses
- Mirrors (flat, spherical and parabolic)
- Equatorial mount refractor telescopes and photographic telescopes
- Meridian circles (fixed and portable)
- Astronomical and geodesical equipment for scientific missions and explorers
- Simple refractor and equatorial telescopes for amateur comet hunters
- Equipment for physicists
- Coelostats
- Siderostats
- Heliostats
- Astronomical domes and metallic shelters
- Complete installations of observatories
- Instruments for geodesy and meteorology

The company furnished optical instruments to the Paris Observatory, the Faculté des Sciences de Paris, the Bureau des Longitudes, the Camille Flammarion Observatory in Juvisy, the Société Astronomique de France, French government ministries, several observatories in France and in other countries, meteorological stations, bridge and road engineers, railroads, and mines. It won a gold medal at the Exposition Universelle in Paris in 1900.

Mailhat became a member of the Société astronomique de France in 1888 (only one year after it was established). At the time when he joined, he was a constructor-mechanic, residing at 5, passage Stanislas, Paris. Mailhat served on the society's management council in 1894 (and again in 1912) Advertisements for his company's telescopes appeared regularly in the pages of the society’s bulletin.

The Maison Mailhat and its fellow Paris-based competitors the Secrétan and Bardou companies were among the leading French precision optics manufacturers of the early twentieth century. Mailhat telescopes and optical products were widely exported to Europe, the United States and even further afield.

Ferdinand Quénisset used Mailhat lenses for early photographs of Mars in 1899 at the Camille Flammarion Observatory in Juvisy.

On 1 April 1908, the company’s offices and workshops moved to 10, rue Emile-Dubois Paris, close to the Paris Observatory. The following year, Mailhat sold his company to Francis Mouronval (1881-1954). Mouronval continued to produce and sell telescopes under the Maison Mailhat name for seven years. Following Mouronval's mobilisation during the World War II, he publicly announced in 1916 that the Mailhat-Mouronval company was closed "for the duration of the war". This closure appears to have been definitive.

During the war, Mailhat served as ‘’Officier de l’administration de 3e classe territorial’’ in the Service des fabrications de l'aviation (military aircraft manufacturing). For his contribution to the war effort, he received the Légion d’Honneur in 1918.

Mailhat died on 22 April 1923 at his home at 13, rue Boileau in Montrouge (Seine).

== Notable Mailhat instruments ==
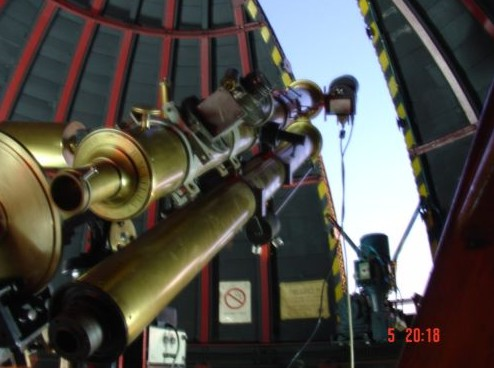
Mailhat equatorial refractor telescope in San José Observatory, Buenos Aires

- Equatorial refractor of 190 mm diameter in the second astronomical dome of the Observatory of the Société Astronomique de France at its former headquarters on rue Serpente in Paris. Mailhat’s telescope was exclusively reserved for scientific research.
- Astro-photographic double equatorial refractor of 380 mm diameter at the Fabra Observatory in Barcelona. This telescope was used by Josep Comas i Solà to observe the moons of Mars, Deimos and Phobos, in 1909, and to photograph Halley’s comet in 1910.
- Meridian circle at the Rouen Popular Observatory.
- Astro-photographic equatorial mount refractors constructed for the Ebro Observatory in Tortosa, Spain and the Puebla Observatory.
- Astro-photographic double equatorial refractor of 127mm diameter at the San José Observatory in Buenos Aires, Argentina.

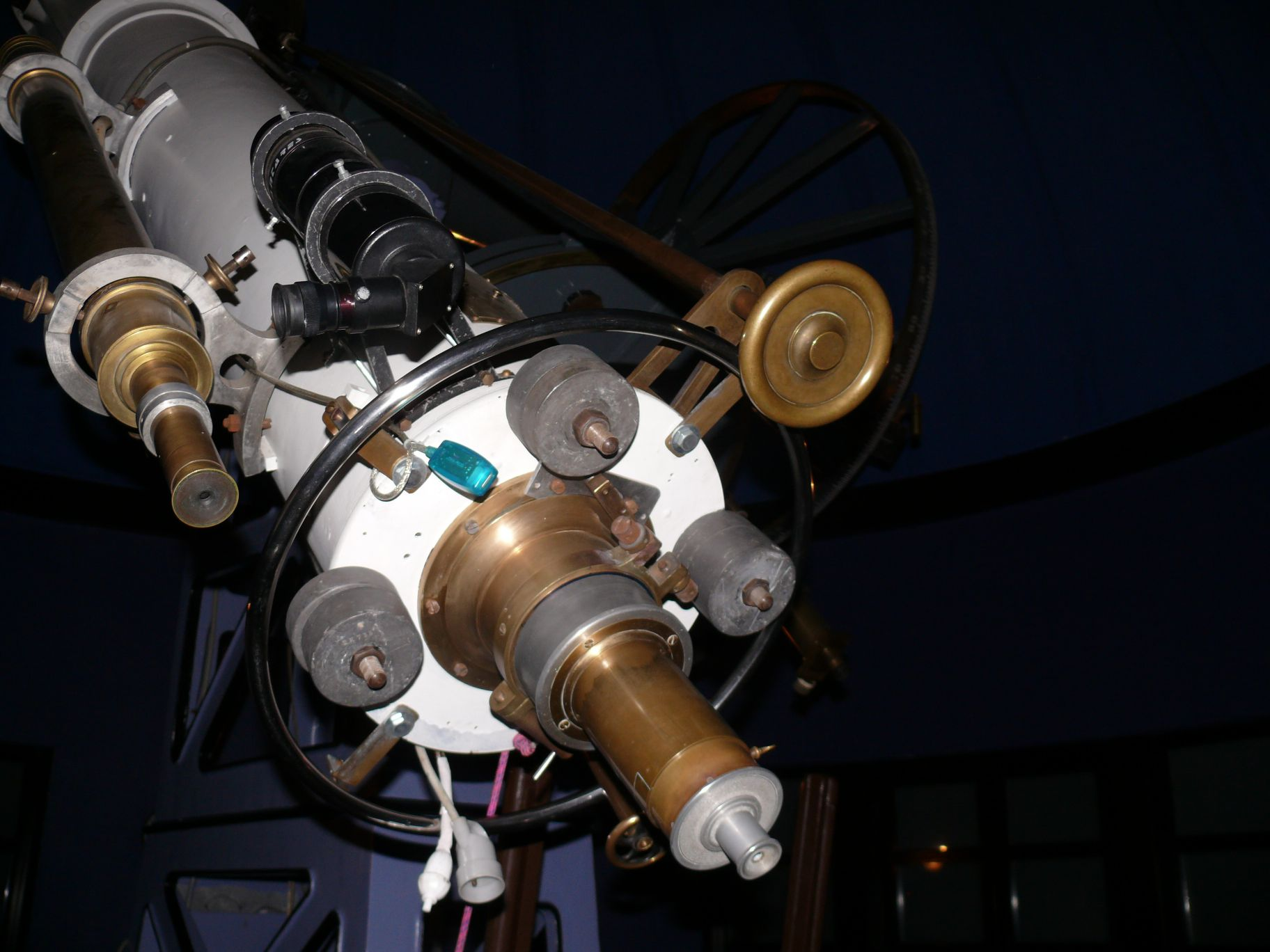
Mailhat refractor at Lille Observatory

- Equatorial refractor of 325 mm diameter and 6 m focal length at the Lille Observatory.

== Honors and awards ==
- 1906 – Prix des Dames by the Société astronomique de France
- 1911 – Officier de l’Instruction publique by the Ministry of Education
- 1911 – Founding Member (Membre Fondateur) of the Société astronomique de France because of his donation of many valuable telescopes to the society over the years.
- 1918 – Chevalier of the Légion d’Honneur
