= Observatory of the rue Serpente =

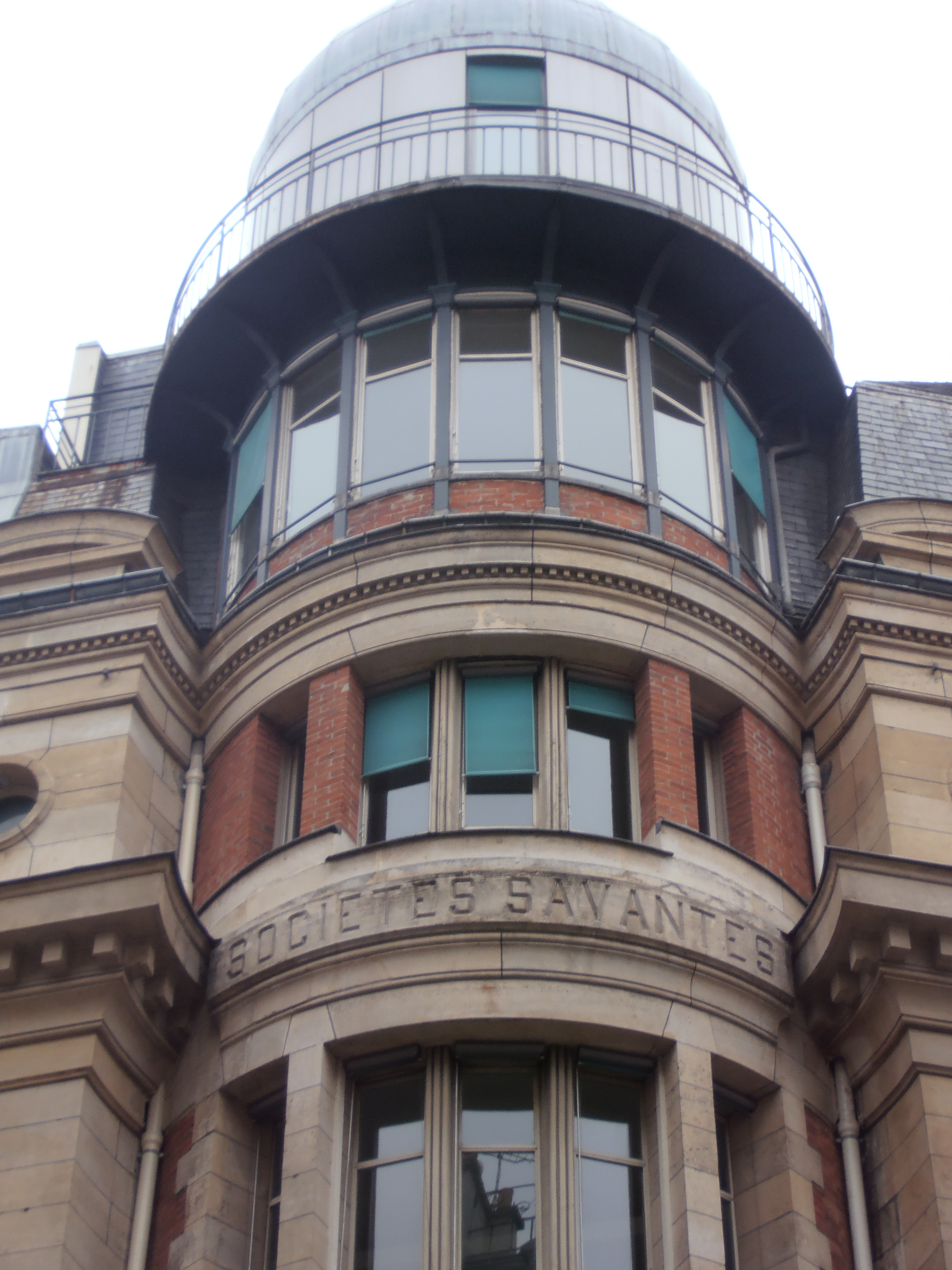
- Alternative names: Observatory of the Société Astronomique de France
- Organization: Société Astronomique de France
- Location: 28 rue Serpente, 6th Arrondissement, Paris, France
- Coordinates: 48.852680°N 2.341642°E
- Altitude: 50 meters (160 ft)
- Established: 1890
- Closed: 1968

Telescopes
- Bardou refractor 108 mm
- Secrétan meridian circle 75 mm
- Refractor 153 mm
- Mailhat refractor 190 mm
- Benoit refractor 220 mm

The Observatory of the rue Serpente was an astronomical observatory owned and operated by the Société Astronomique de France (the French Astronomical Society) in the historic Latin Quarter of Paris. It operated between 1890 until 1968, when it was transferred to a new location at the nearby Astronomy Tower of the Sorbonne.

== Origin ==
On 4 April 1887, the headquarters of the recently founded Société Astronomique de France was established at the Hôtel des Sociétés Savantes, a building that housed different scientific societies, at 28 rue Serpente in the 6th arrondissement of Paris. At the suggestion of Camille Flammarion, the society's founder, an observatory was built on the building's roof. Its purpose was to popularize astronomy and it would be open to all members of the Society. The observatory eventually included two domes (which still exist today), a meridian room, a meeting room, and a library, and it occupied the entire upper floor of the building. Over the years, the society gave courses on astronomical topics for amateurs on the observatory premises (elementary astronomy starting in 1902, spectral analysis starting in 1906, mathematics for astronomy starting in 1922), providing an opportunity to combine theory with practice using the in-house telescopes.

== First Dome ==
The first dome was built in 1889 by the engineer Adolphe Gilon. It housed an equatorial mount refractor with a diameter of 108 mm constructed by Denis Albert Bardou and a meridian circle of 75 mm manufactured by Georges Emmanuel Secrétan. In 1935, the Bardou telescope was replaced by a refractor of 153 mm diameter, equipped with a T. Cooke & Sons lens, a mount made by Maurice Manent and an electric motor. The new telescope was largely paid for by a subscription of members of the society.

== Second Dome ==
In 1900, the building was remodeled and a second dome was added. It housed an equatorial-mount refractor with a diameter of 190 mm and a focal length of 2 meters (later extended to 3 meters) constructed by Raymond Augustin Mailhat. That telescope remained in use until 1950, when the society installed a new refractor with a 220 mm diameter and 3 meter focal length constructed by Antonin Benoit. This instrument was reserved for the use of amateurs, in particular for the observation and measure of double stars as well as drawing the surfaces of planets.

== Legacy ==
The telescopes of the Société Astronomique de France's observatory were used by numerous amateurs and professionals over its nearly 80 years of operation. Many young amateurs who later became important professional figures in astronomy used the facility, including Fernand Baldet, Henri Chrétien, André-Louis Danjon, Ferdinand Quénisset (later an astronomer at the Camille Flammarion Observatory), Gilbert Rougier and many more.

== Closure ==
In 1968, the Paris-Sorbonne University became the owner of the Hotel des Sociétés savantes and the Société Astronomique de France was obliged to leave the rue Serpente. In 1980, the 153 mm refractor that was formerly installed in the first dome was removed and installed in the Astronomy Tower of the Sorbonne, where it continues to be used today by amateurs and the general public.

== See also ==
- List of astronomical observatories
