= List of developers of optical scientific equipment =

Profession

A developer of optical scientific equipment is an individual who makes and adjusts optical aids for scientific purposes, including telescope optics and microscope lenses.

== Telescope developers ==
- James Gilbert Baker
- Denis Albert Bardou
- John A. Brashear
- Laurent Cassegrain
- Henri Chrétien
- Alvan Clark
- John Dollond
- Charles Wesley Elmer and Richard Scott Perkin
- Galileo Galilei
- James Gregory
- John Hadley
- Chester Moore Hall
- Robert Hooke
- Johannes Kepler
- Frederick James Hargreaves
- Christiaan Huygens
- Hans Lippershey
- Raymond Augustin Mailhat
- Dmitri Dmitrievich Maksutov
- James Henry Marriott
- Jacob Metius
- Isaac Newton
- Georg Simon Plössl
- Russell W. Porter
- Jesse Ramsden
- George Willis Ritchey
- Christoph Scheiner
- Bernhard Schmidt
- James Short

See also Timeline of telescope technology and List of astronomical instrument makers

== Microscope developers ==
- Ernst Karl Abbe
- Denis Albert Bardou
- Christopher Cock
- Siegfried Czapski
- Cornelius Drebbel
- Galileo Galilei
- Robert Hooke
- Christiaan Huygens
- Carl Kellner
- Anton van Leeuwenhoek
- Moritz von Rohr

See also Timeline of microscope technology
