= OSJ =

OSJ may refer to:

- Optical Society of Japan, a professional organization of physicists
- Officer of the Order of the Star of Jordan, a military decoration of Jordan
- Officer of the Venerable Order of Saint John, an order of chivalry
- San José Observatory, an astronomy observatory in Buenos Aires, Argentina
- Orchestra of St John's, a UK orchestra
- Oblates of St. Joseph, a Catholic religious institute
- Old San Juan, the historic colonial district of San Juan, Puerto Rico
