= Astronomy Tower of the Sorbonne =

Tower at Sorbonne University in France

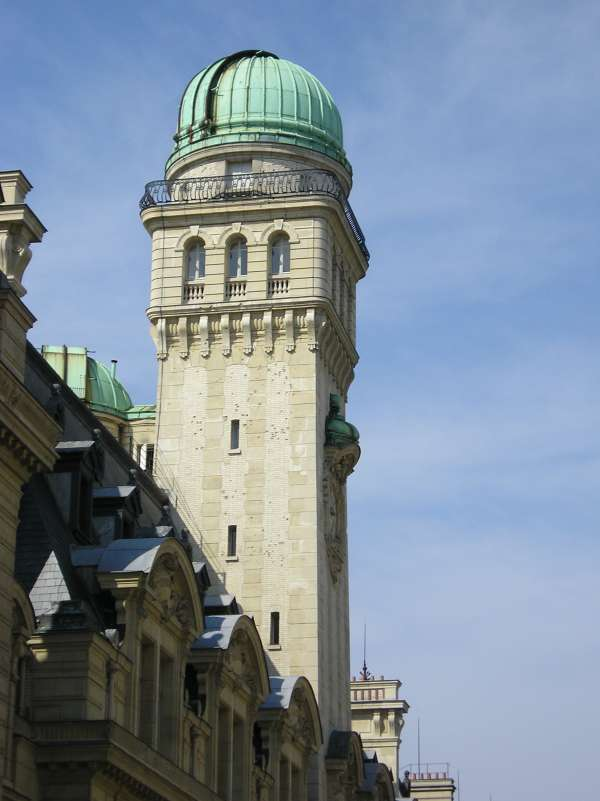
- Alternative names: La Tour d’astronomie de la Sorbonne, Sorbonne Observatory
- Named after: Sorbonne
- Organization: Société astronomique de France
- Location: 17, rue de la Sorbonne, 75005, Paris, France
- Coordinates: 48°50′56″N 2°20′38″E
- Established: 1885-1901
- Related media on Commons

The Astronomy Tower of the Sorbonne is a tower at the Sorbonne University's Paris campus built to house an astronomical observatory for its students. The structure was erected during the reconstruction of the Sorbonne, between 1885 and 1901. The tower is 39 meters high, has an upper and lower dome, and includes several rooms. The upper dome houses the telescope, and the lower dome contains an optics workshop for amateurs to make mirrors (previously, a meridian circle was installed in that space). The tower is operated by the Société astronomique de France and is available for tours and amateur observations.

== Telescopes ==
The observatory originally had an equatorial mount telescope of 241 mm diameter and a 3,755 mm focal length constructed by the R. Mailhat company. The instrument was transferred to the Paris Observatory in 1909.

In 1980, an equatorial mount refracting telescope of 153 mm diameter and 2,300 mm focal length was installed in the upper dome. The telescope is owned by the Société astronomique de France. It was built in 1935 and was originally installed in the Observatory of the rue Serpente on top of the society’s former headquarters at 28, rue Serpente, Paris.

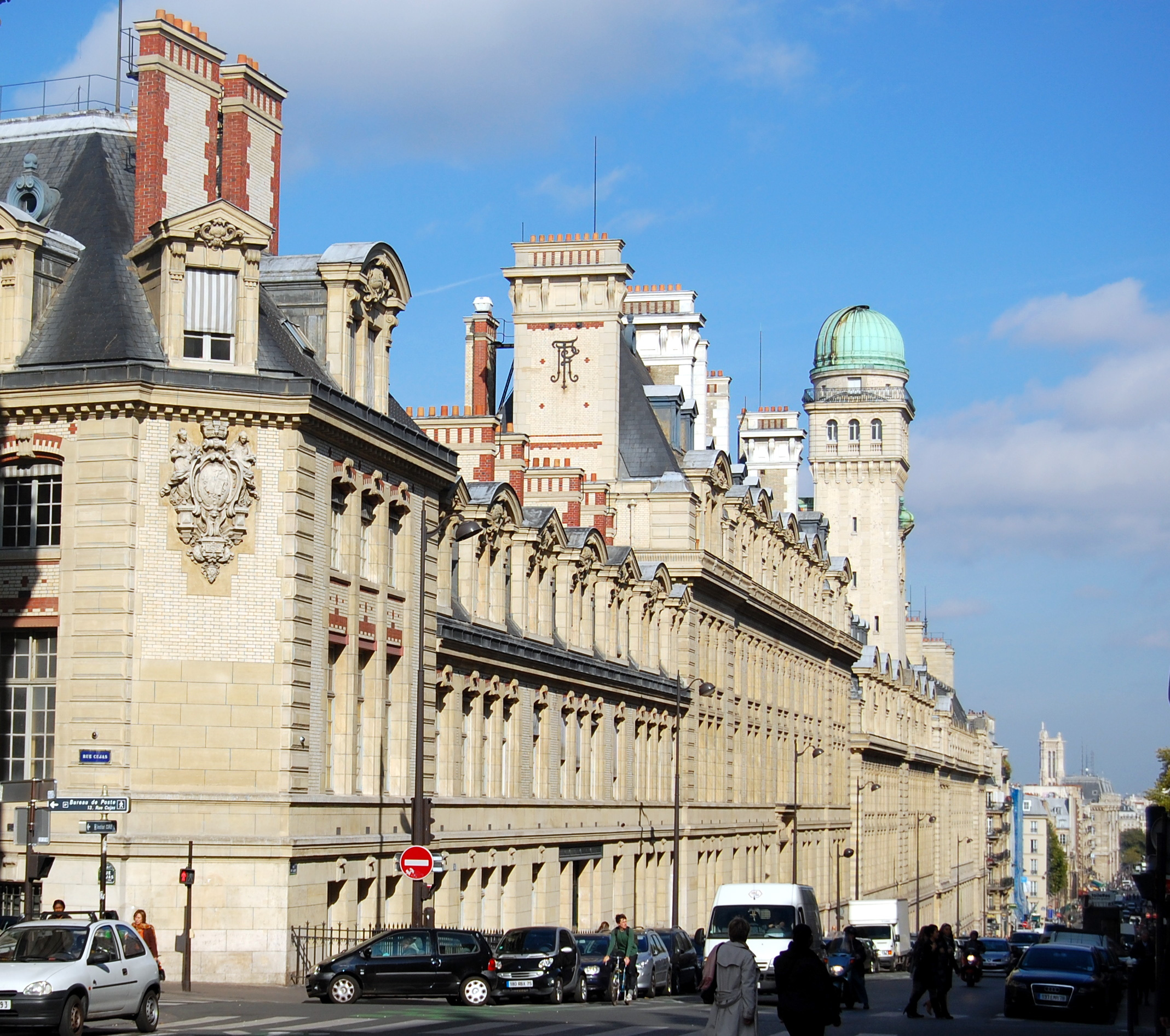
Astronomy Tower seen from rue Saint Jacques

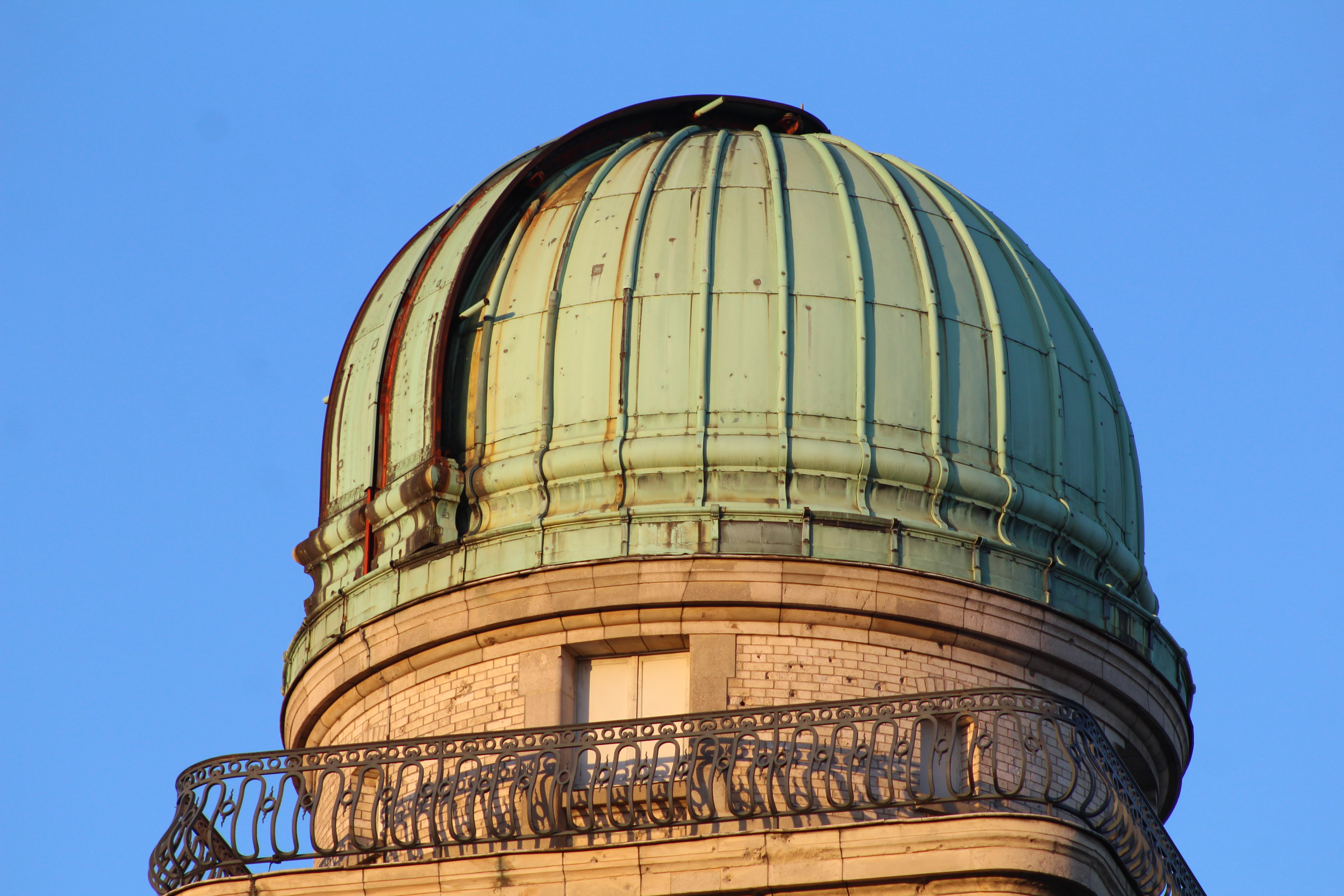
Close-up of the upper dome

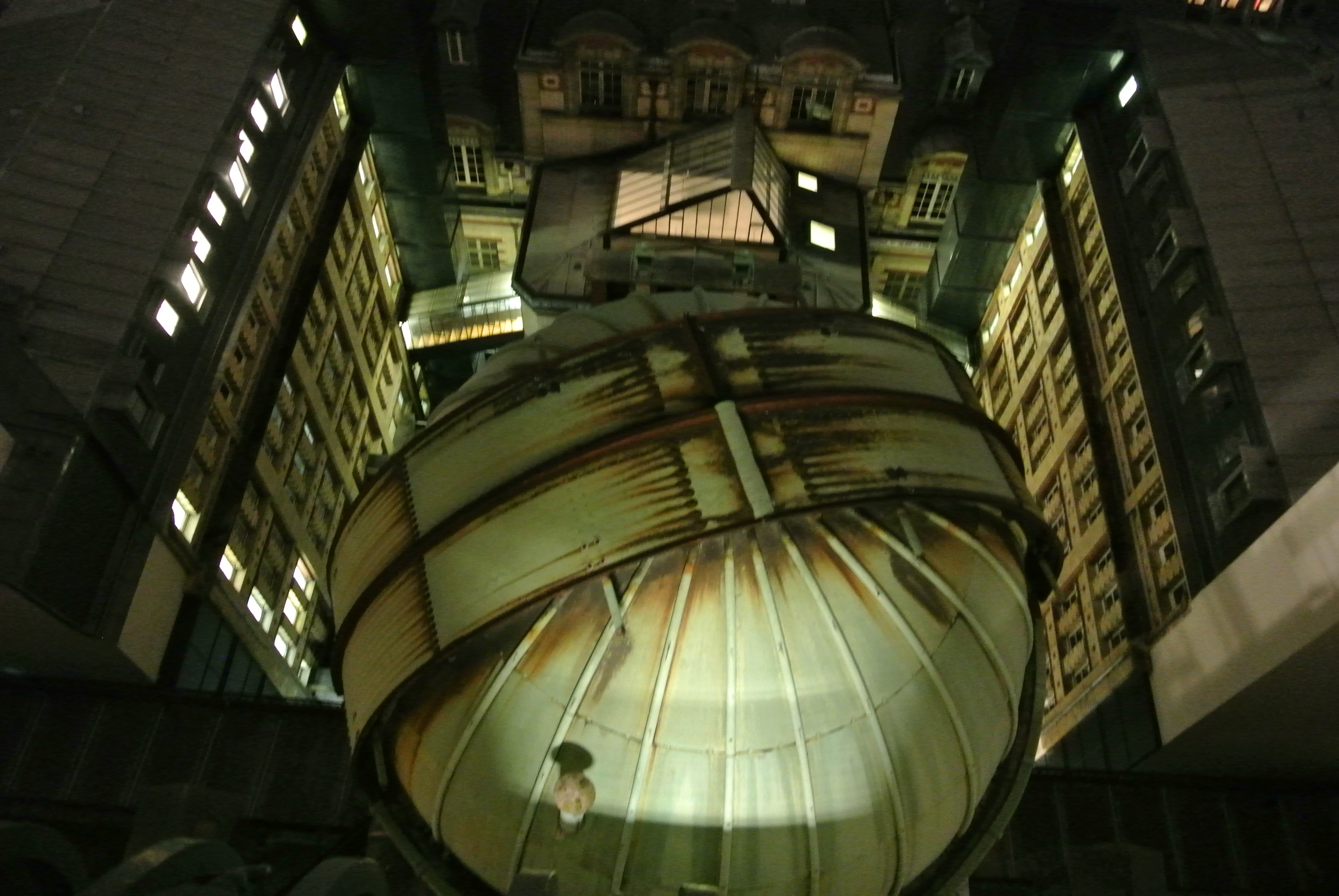
Lower dome housing the optics workshop

== See also ==
- List of astronomical observatories
