= 605 Juvisia =

Minor planet that orbits in the asteroid belt

Discovery
- Discovered by: Max Wolf
- Discovery site: Heidelberg
- Discovery date: 27 August 1906

Designations
- Pronunciation: /dʒuːˈvɪziə/ French: [ʒyvizia]
- Alternative designations: 1906 UU

Orbital characteristics
- Epoch 31 July 2016 (JD 2457600.5)
- Uncertainty parameter 0
- Observation arc: 109.53 yr (40005 d)
- Aphelion: 3.4164 AU (511.09 Gm)
- Perihelion: 2.5809 AU (386.10 Gm)
- Semi-major axis: 2.9986 AU (448.58 Gm)
- Eccentricity: 0.13932
- Orbital period (sidereal): 5.19 yr (1896.6 d)
- Mean anomaly: 93.317°
- Mean motion: 0° 11^{m} 23.316^{s} / day
- Inclination: 19.663°
- Longitude of ascending node: 342.852°
- Argument of perihelion: 14.570°

Physical characteristics
- Mean radius: 34.93±2.25 km
- Synodic rotation period: 15.93 h (0.664 d)
- Geometric albedo: 0.0397±0.006
- Absolute magnitude (H): 10.0

605 Juvisia is a minor planet, specifically an asteroid orbiting in the asteroid belt that was discovered 27 August 1906 in Heidelberg by German astronomer Max Wolf. It was named after the commune Juvisy-sur-Orge, France, where French astronomer Camille Flammarion had his observatory.

Photometric observations at the Palmer Divide Observatory in Colorado Springs, Colorado, in 1999 were used to build a light curve for this object. The asteroid displayed a rotation period of 15.93 ± 0.02 hours and a brightness variation of 0.25 ± 0.01 in magnitude.

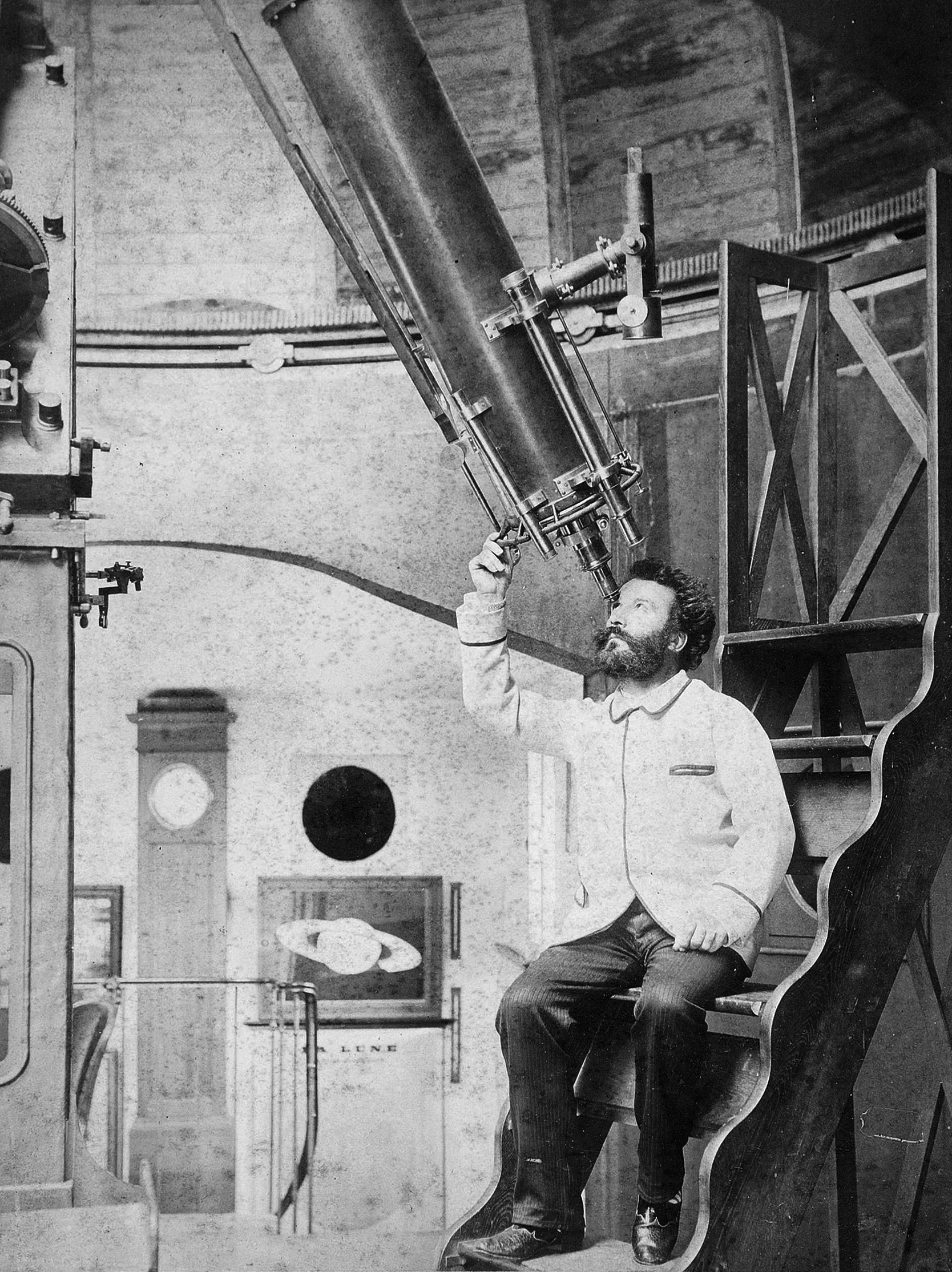
Flammarion in his observatory at Juvisy
