= Gabrielle Renaudot Flammarion =

French astronomer (1877–1962)

- Born: Gabrielle Renaudot; 31 May 1877
- Died: 28 October 1962 (aged 85)
- Spouse: Camille Flammarion
- Scientific career
- Fields: Astronomy
- Institutions: Camille Flammarion Observatory

Gabrielle Renaudot Flammarion (née Renaudot) (31 May 1877 – 28 October 1962) was a French astronomer. She worked at the Camille Flammarion Observatory at Juvisy-sur-Orge, France, and was General Secretary of the Société astronomique de France.

She published work in the changing surface features of Mars, the Great Red Spot on Jupiter, and observations of other planets, minor planets and variable stars and recorded astronomy-related activities and events in numerous articles.

== Family ==
Born as Gabrielle Renaudot, her parents were Jules Renaudot, a sculptor, and Maria-Veronica Concetta Latini, who was Italian (d. 1900). Her brother was the artist Paul Renaudot.

She married Camille Flammarion, who was also an accomplished astronomer. She was his second wife. Flammarion's first wife, Sylvie Petiaux-Hugo, died in 1919.

== Honors and awards ==
- 1948 - Prix d'Aumale of the Académie des sciences
- An impact crater on Mars, Renaudot, was named in her honor by the International Astronomical Union, and her first name was the basis for naming the asteroid 355 Gabriella.
