= Octave Callandreau =

French astronomer

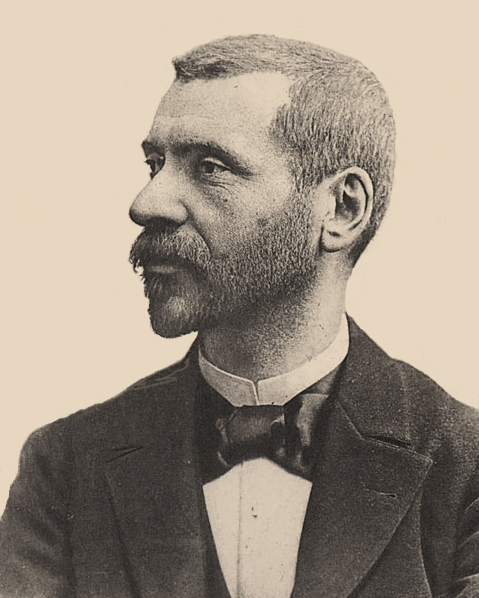
- Born: 18 September 1852
- Died: 13 February 1904 (aged 51)
- Scientific career
- Fields: Astronomy
- Thesis: Résumé des opérations exécutées jusqu'à la fin de 1911 pour la description géométrique détaillée des Alpes françaises (1912)

Pierre Jean Octave Callandreau (18 September 1852 – 13 February 1904) was a French astronomer who contributed to celestial mechanics on the calculation of orbits and the use of perturbations. He also served as a professor of astronomy at the École Polytechnique from 1893.

== Life and work ==
Callandreau was born in Angoulême, France, the son of Amédée Callandreau, a notary and genealogist. Pierre Callendreau was his grandfather. Callandreau went to the École Polytechnique in 1874. He became interested in astronomy and worked as an assistant to Le Verrier at the Paris Observatory. He studied celestial mechanics under Victor Puiseux at Sorbonne. He became adjoint astronomer in 1881. In 1879 he translated Hugo Gyldén's Swedish work on perturbation theory. He worked on checking Lalande's star catalogue while also working on mechanics. He worked on a method of computing Laplace's coefficients in planetary theory. His doctoral work continued on the topic at the Faculty of Sciences, Paris and his thesis was on the application of Gyldén's method to the perturbations of minor planets. Callandreau was elected to the Académie des Sciences in 1892 and became a professor of astronomy at the École Polytechnique the next year. He began a large scale study of shooting stars when he became a president of the Société Astronomique de France in 1899. He travelled as part of the French mission to Haiti in 1882 to observe the transit of Venus. Callandreau was a founding member and editor of the Astronomical Bulletin from 1884.

Callandreau was married from 1882 to Sophie de Luynes, daughter of an arts professor, and they had seven children.
