= Christopher Cock =

British instrument maker

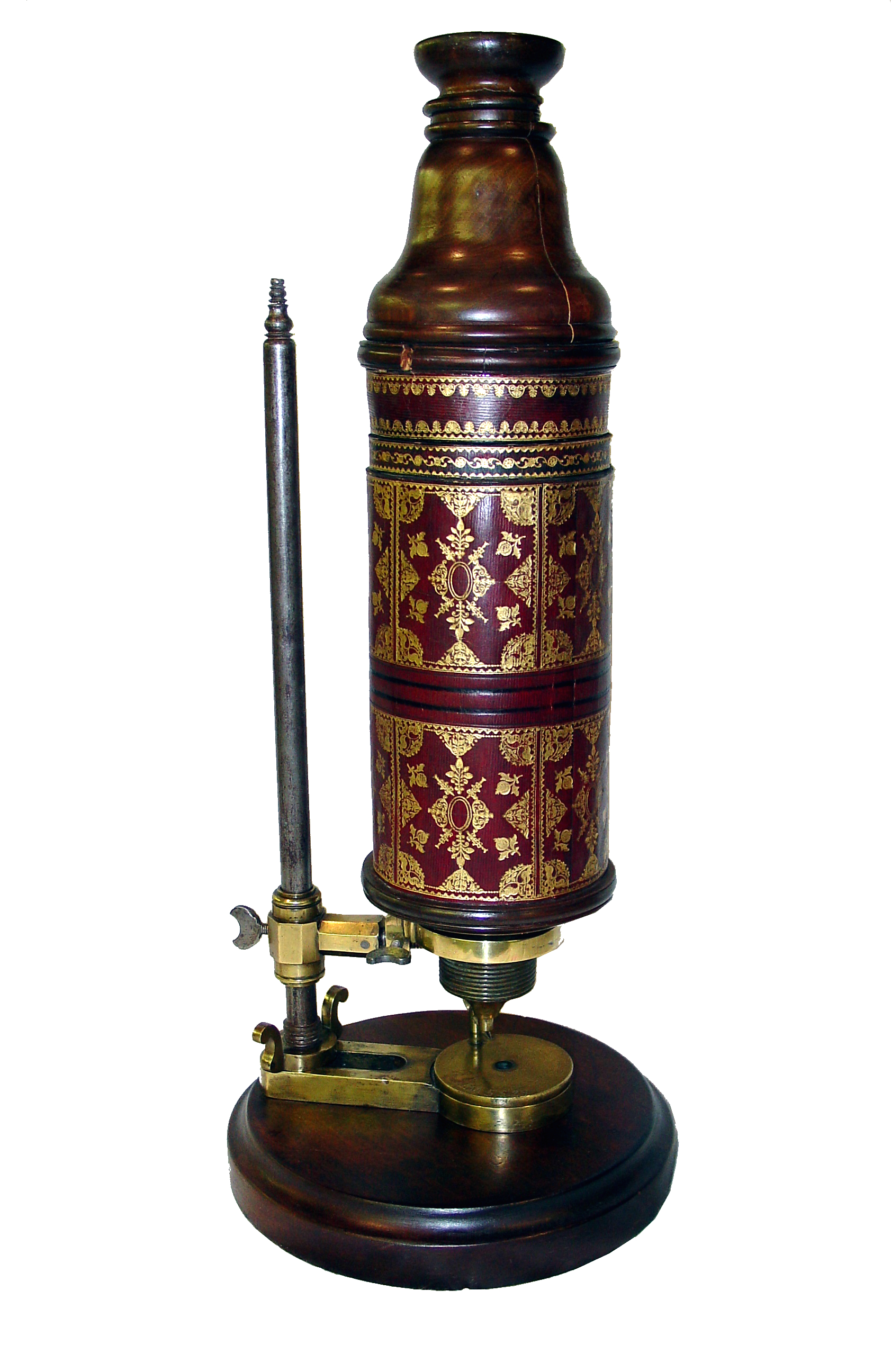
Microscope manufactured by Christopher Cock of London for Robert Hooke. Hooke is believed to have used this microscope for the observations that formed the basis of Micrographia. (M-030 00276) Courtesy – Billings Microscope Collection, National Museum of Health and Medicine, AFIP).

Christopher Cock was a London instrument maker of the 17th century, who supplied microscopes to Robert Hooke. These microscopes were compound lens instruments, which suffered greatly from spherical aberration.

== Bibliography ==
- Chapman, Allan and Paul Kent (2005). Robert Hooke and the English Renaissance. Leominster: Gracewing.
- Inwood, Stephen (2003). The Forgotten Genius: The Biography of Robert Hooke 1635-1703. San Francisco: Mcadam/Cage.
- Helen Purtle, The Billings Microscope Collection of the Medical Museum, Armed Forces Institute of Pathology (Second Edition) Washington, DC: Armed Forces Institute of Pathology, 1974 (Reprinted 1987).
