= Saurat =

Commune in Occitanie, France

- Commune
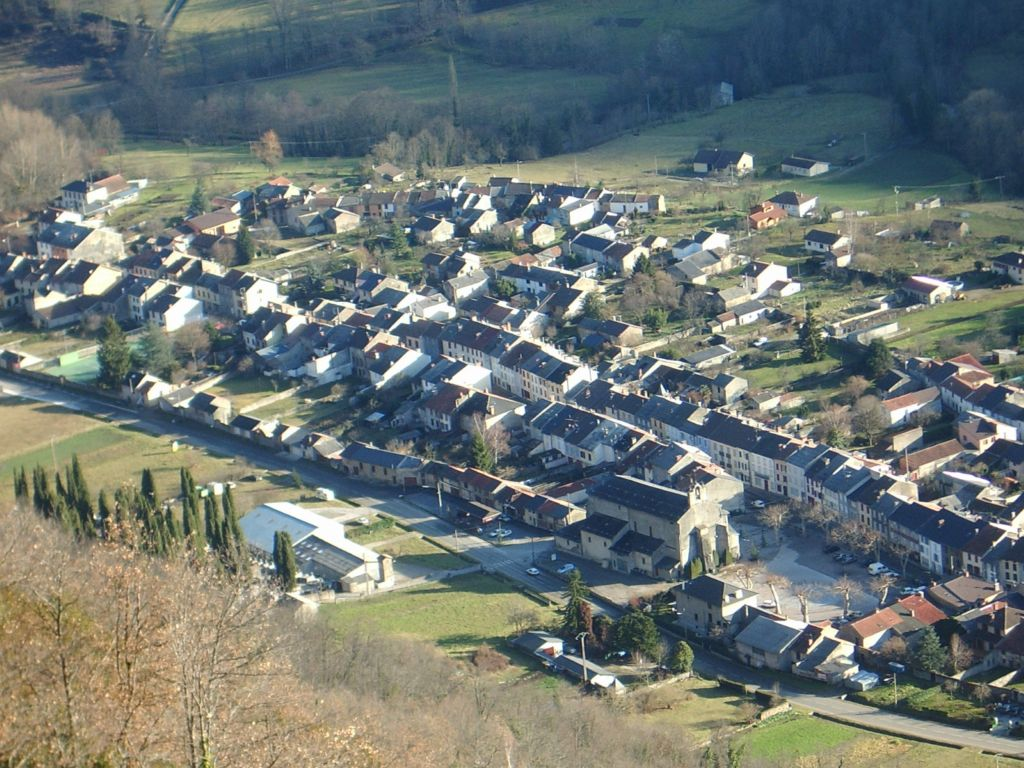
- Saurat seen from above

- Coat of arms
- Location of Saurat
- Location within France Location within Occitanie
- Coordinates: 42°52′42″N 1°32′18″E
- Country: France
- Region: Occitania
- Department: Ariège
- Arrondissement: Foix
- Canton: Sabarthès
- Intercommunality: Pays de Tarascon

Government
  - Mayor (2020–2026): Jean-Luc Rouan
- Area^{1}: 44.29 km^{2} (17.10 sq mi)
- Elevation: 678 m (2,224 ft)
- Highest elevation: 1,941 m (6,368 ft)
- Lowest elevation: 621 m (2,037 ft)
- Population (2023): 700
  - Density: 16/km^{2} (41/sq mi)
- Time zone: UTC+01:00 (CET)
  - Summer (DST): UTC+02:00 (CEST)
- INSEE/Postal code: 09280 /09400
- ^{1} French Land Register data, which excludes lakes, ponds, glaciers > 1 km^{2} (0.386 sq mi or 247 acres) and river estuaries.

Saurat (French pronunciation: [soʁat]) is a commune in the Ariège department in southwestern France.

== Population ==
Inhabitants of Saurat are called Sauratois in French.

Historical population
| Year | Pop. | ±% p.a. |
|---|---|---|
| 1968 | 1,007 | — |
| 1975 | 812 | −3.03% |
| 1982 | 693 | −2.24% |
| 1990 | 652 | −0.76% |
| 1999 | 601 | −0.90% |
| 2007 | 592 | −0.19% |
| 2012 | 668 | +2.45% |
| 2017 | 636 | −0.98% |
| 2023 | 700 | +1.61% |
Source: INSEE

== See also ==
- Communes of the Ariège department
