= San José Observatory =

San José Observatory (OSJ)
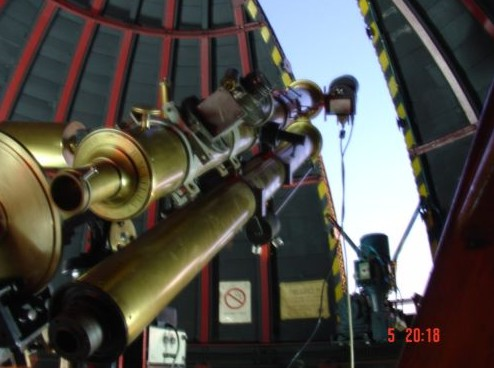
- Mailhat ecuatorial refractor astro-graphic telescope.
- Interactive map of the San José Observatory (OSJ) area

General information
- Location: Buenos Aires, Argentina
- Coordinates: 34°36′27.32″S 58°24′4.58″W
- Construction started: 1870
- Owner: Colegio San José (Buenos Aires)

Website
- OSJ web site

The San José Observatory (OSJ) is an amateur astronomy observatory located in Buenos Aires, Argentina. It was founded in 1913, but was initially constructed in 1870. It is the oldest astronomical observatory in Buenos Aires which still remains in activity. The institution currently performs research and recreational activities for the public as courses or seminars.

== Technical Means ==
The observatory has several sections for education, outreach, and astronomical observation. For its unique location in the central tower of the San José school, its structure is vertical type, where a section succeeds another in the subsequent floor, accessed by a centennial all wooden staircase tower type.

=== Astronomical Observatory ===
Fitted in the center of the block comprising San José school and the Church of Our Lady is Balvanera Observatory Tower, at the top stands the dome swivel with 5 meters in diameter houses; it is the main instrument of the Observatory.

==== Mailhat ecuatorial telescope ====
The equatorial telescope, manufactured by Raymond Augustin Mailhat, is the main instrument of the San José Observatory. The telescope is a refractor astro-chart of 1990 mm focal length of 127 mm opening in each tube, the original system of weights and watch Watt regulator was replaced by an electric synchronous motor for easy tracking of the stars. The original eye missing, they were replaced by modern Meade eyepieces of different focal lengths. The origin of this instrument is French and was delivered to the centre as a donation by Mr. Sinforozo Molina, parent of a student in the early twentieth century. The German-type equatorial mount supports two twins one tubes suitable for visual observation and one for photography, the latter had a mechanical tube for making glass photographic plates currently in the room old instruments because it was replaced by a modern CCD camera. During the subsequent amendments that were made to keep using the old telescope sought to minimize the impact of the change being able to maintain the original look of this unique instrument.

==== CCD camera ====
It has an S-Big ST7 camera that associated equatorial lower instruments or photographic lens allows observation multitask as astronomical photography and supernova search

==== Bretón Telescope ====
Old altazimuth refractor used for basic education

=== Classroom ===
The room under the dome to dictate the various courses of astronomy, with a capacity for 20 people it is equipped with various media and tools built demonstration by members of the observatory that allow virtually experience the various astronomical phenomena

=== Old instruments room ===
In it are preserved many instruments used in astronomical research and teaching, they were restored and classified over the years by members of the Observatory Currently you can see also web OSJ Antiguos Instrumentos

=== Workshop ===
Also officiating as usual meeting room, the workshop is repaired where most instruments are prepared and samples classes open to the public, as well as new instruments to be used in demo them.

== Activities ==
Over the years there have been various activities related to astronomy: observation of sunspots, variable star observing, astrophotography, supernova search, observation of comets, occultations, teaching courses, the public open days, etc. Undoubtedly the main activity of the Observatory San Jose, faithful to the purpose for which it was founded, is the teaching and dissemination of astronomy.

=== Courses ===
Throughout the year various courses are offered in the concurrent participating can go to get a thorough idea of how the universe is made, the means of observation and adventure meant for man to unravel the mysteries of the cosmos The aim is to achieve a theoretical-practical observations each topic bound to chords astronomicas ephemeris time.

- Observational Astronomy
- Telescopes
- Astronomy History
- Solar System
- Stellar Astronomy
