= Société astronomique de France =

Astronomical French organization

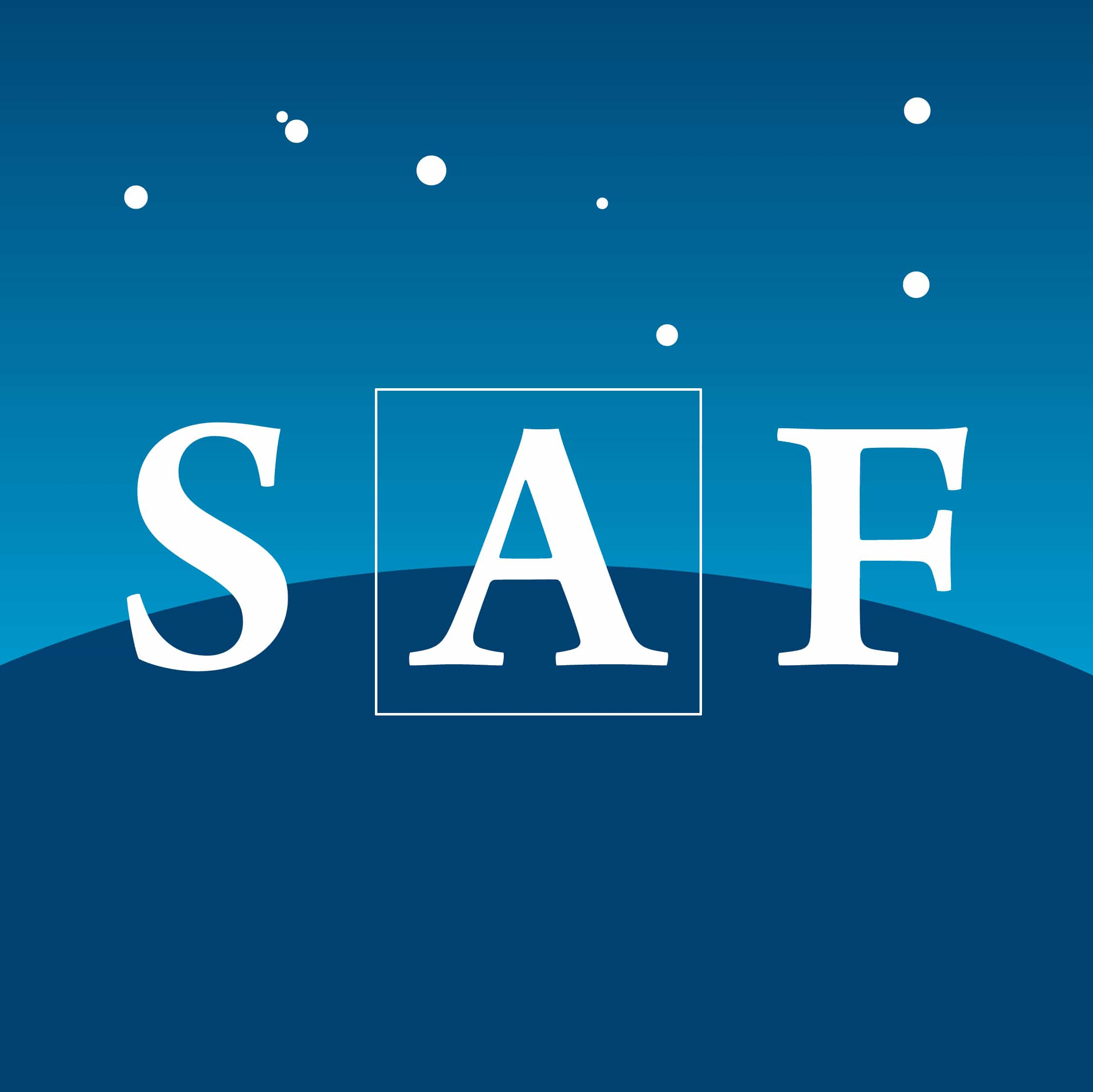
- Founded: 28 January 1887; 139 years ago
- Founder: Camille Flammarion
- Type: Non-profit association
- Purpose: To promote the development and practice of astronomy
- Headquarters: 3, rue Beethoven, Paris 75016, France
- Region served: France and French-speaking countries
- Official language: French
- President: Roland Lehoucq
- Website: http://www.saf-astronomie.fr

The Société astronomique de France (SAF; French: [sɔsjete astʁɔnɔmik də fʁɑ̃s]), the French astronomical society, is a non-profit association in the public interest organized under French law (Association loi de 1901). Founded by astronomer Camille Flammarion in 1887, its purpose is to promote the development and practice of astronomy.

== History ==
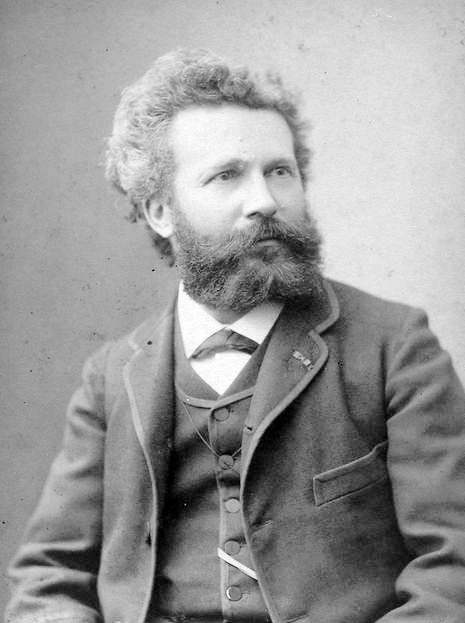
Camille Flammarion, SAF's founder

SAF was established by Camille Flammarion and a group of 11 persons on 28 January 1887 in Flammarion's apartment at 16 rue Cassini, 75014 Paris, close to the Paris Observatory. Open to all, SAF includes both professional and amateur astronomers as members, from France and abroad.

Its objective was defined at the time of its establishment as: "A Society is founded with the aim of bringing together people engaged practically or theoretically in Astronomy, or who are interested in the development of this Science and the extension of its influence for the illumination of minds. Its efforts shall support the advancement and popularization of this Science, as well as facilitating ways and means for those who wish to undertake astronomical studies. All friends of Science and Progress are invited for its establishment and development."

On 4 April 1887, the headquarters was established at the Hôtel des Sociétés Savantes, 28 rue Serpente, in the 6th arrondissement of Paris. The society built an observatory on the top floor of the building for its members' use which operated from 1890 to 1968 (Observatory of the rue Serpente). On 17 October 1966, the headquarters moved to the Maison de la Chimie at 28 rue Saint-Dominique, Paris 75007. Since 1974, the headquarters has been located at 3, rue Beethoven, Paris 75016.

The presidents of the Society have included many persons in astronomy and related fields.

== Activities and services ==
- Monthly magazine L'Astronomie.
- Specialized commissions for Astronautics, Astrophilately, Comets, Cosmology, Double stars, History, Instruments, Meteors, meteorites and impacts, Planetary observations, Planetology, Radio Astronomy, Sundials, the Sun, Techniques for amateur astronomy, and Youth.
- Monthly conferences, lectures, initiation courses in astronomy, and regular meetings of the commissions. The monthly conferences are convened at the Conservatoire national des arts et métiers (CNAM).
- Rencontres AstroCiel, an annual astronomical gathering every summer at which astronomy enthusiasts come together for two weeks of nighttime observations.
- An extensive library that includes both historical and modern works, available for research and consultation to members and non-members.
- Three astronomical observatories that are open to the public: the Astronomy Tower of the Sorbonne in the 5th arrondissement of Paris, the Camille Flammarion Observatory in Juvisy-sur-Orge, and the Bélesta Observatory, located in Bélesta-en-Lauragais in the Haute-Garonne departement.
- An optics workshop for members, located in the Astronomy Tower of the Sorbonne.
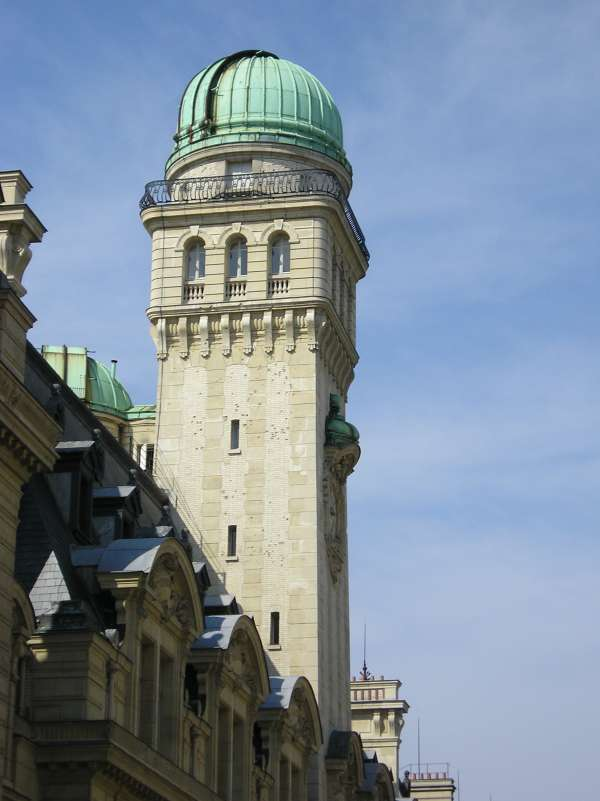
Astronomy Tower of the Sorbonne

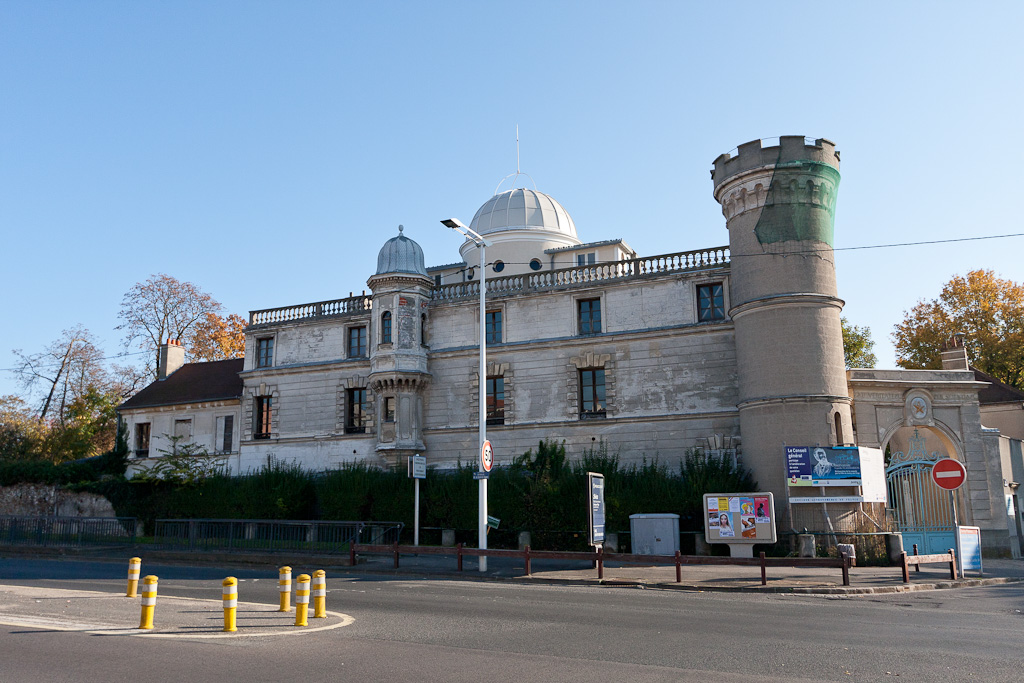
Camille Flammarion Observatory

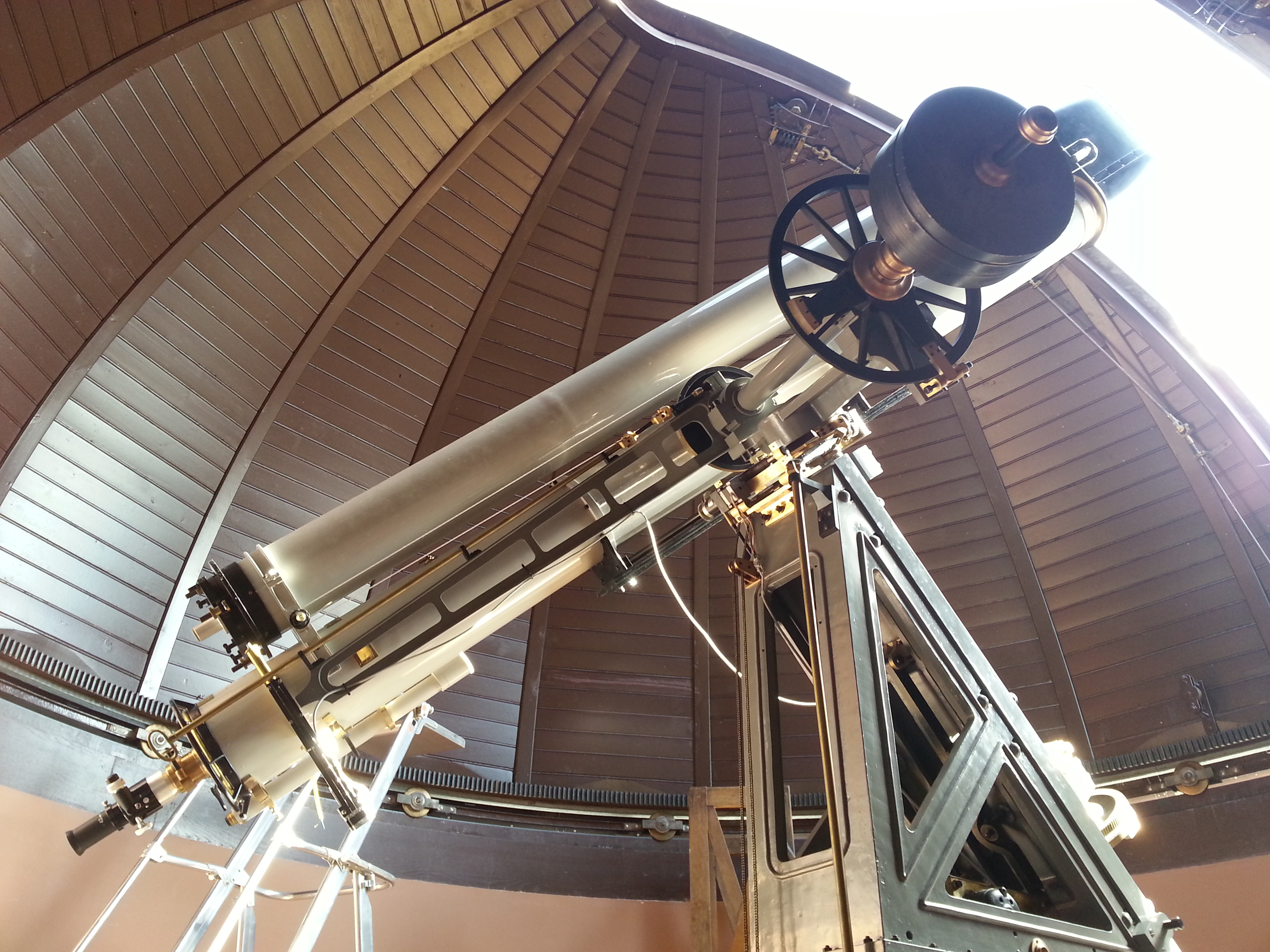
Telescope in the Juvisy Observatory

== Awards ==
The society has offered the following awards over the years to its members and to notable personalities in the field of astronomy in France and abroad. Not all awards are given every year, and some have been discontinued.

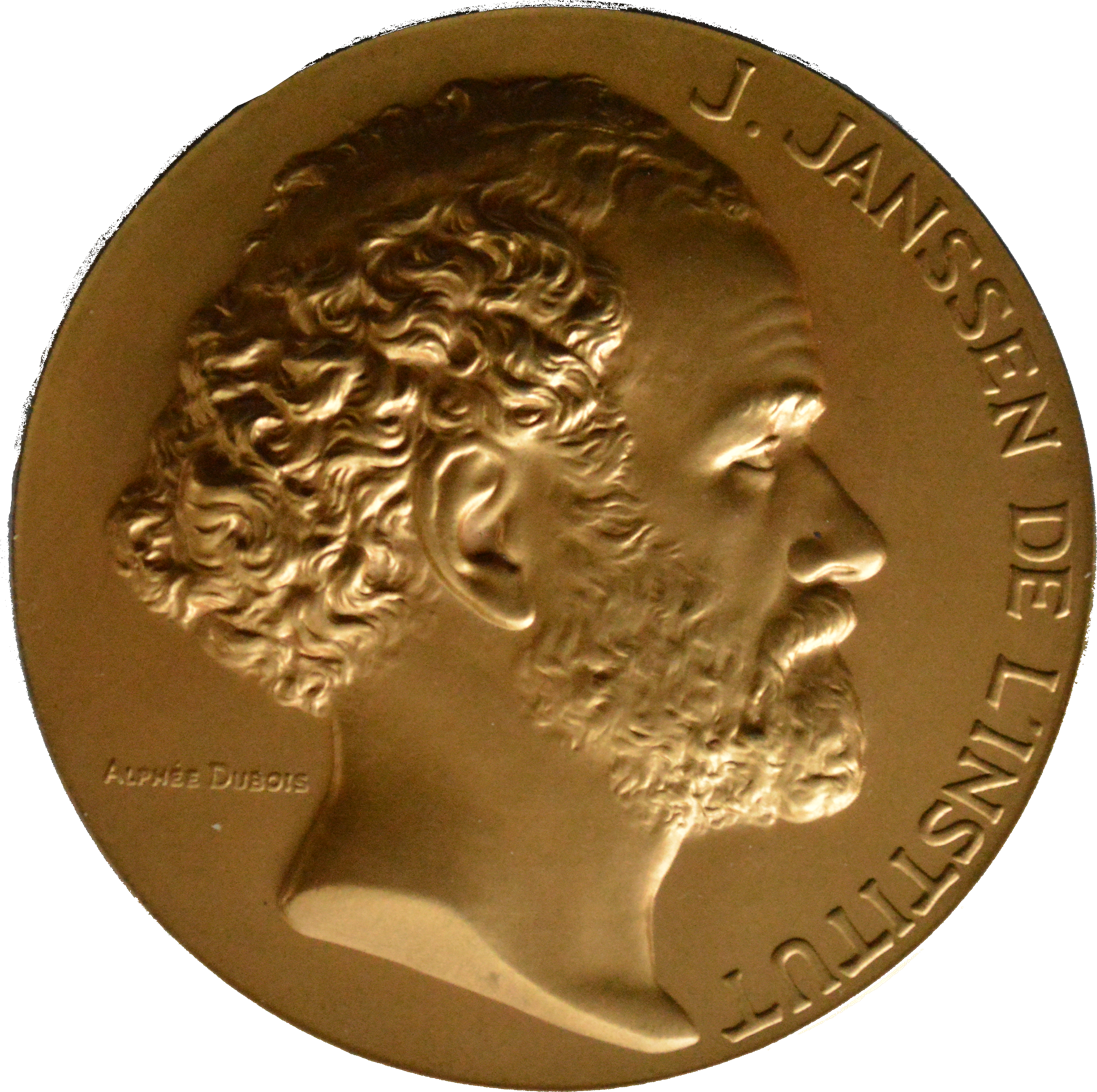
Prix Jules-Janssen medal

- Prix Jules Janssen. Recognition of astronomical work in general, or services rendered to Astronomy, by a professional. Prize established by Jules Janssen. Annual prize awarded 1896–present.
- Prix des Dames. Recognition of services rendered to the Society of any kind. Prize established at the initiative of Sylvie Camille Flammarion and a group of women members of SAF. Annual prize awarded 1896–present.
- Prix Maurice Ballot. Recognition of authors of works of the Society's observatory. Biannual prize established by a donation of Maurice Ballot, SAF Librarian. Awarded when merited. Given 1921–present.
- Prix Georges Bidault de l'Isle. Encouragement of young people who show a special talent for astronomy or meteorology. Individuals are chosen from participants at courses and conferences, collaboration at the Observatory, or through communications in the bulletin during the preceding year. Prior to 1956, this award was known as the Prix de l'Observatoire de la Guette. Annual prize awarded 1925–

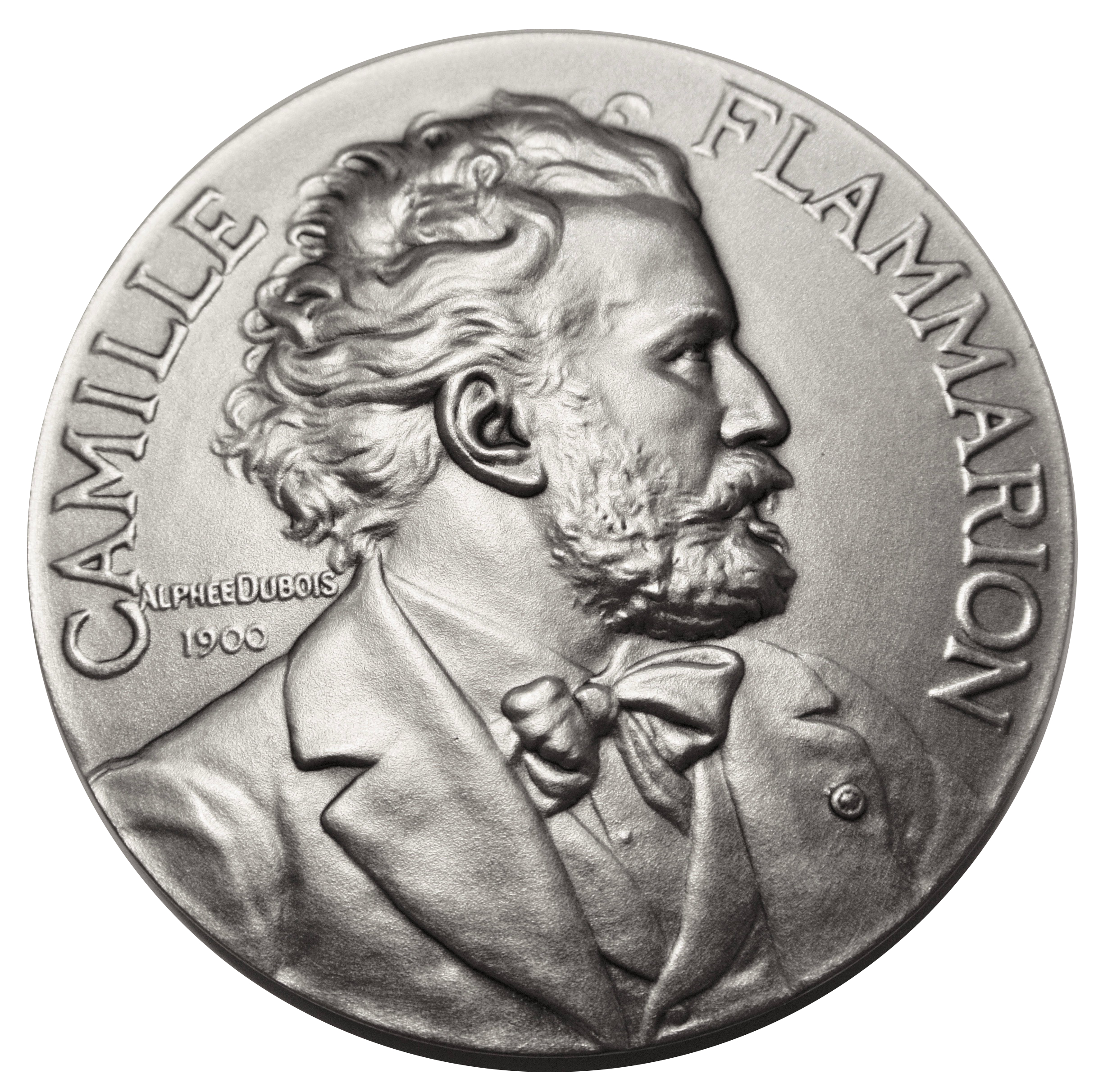
Medal of the Prix Henry Rey, originally designed by Alphée Dubois in 1900

- Prix Henry Rey. Recognition of an important work in astronomy. A silver medal is awarded annually. Established by funds bequeathed by Henry Rey of Marseille. Annual prize awarded 1926–present.
- Prix Gabrielle et Camille Flammarion. Recognition of an important discovery and marked progress in astronomy or in a sister science, to aid an independent researcher, or to assist a young researcher to begin work in astronomy. Given odd-numbered years, alternating with the Prix Dorothea Klumpke-Isaac Roberts. Prize awarded 1930–present.
- Prix Dorothea Klumpke - Isaac Roberts. Encouragement of the study of the wide and diffuse nebulae of William Herschel, the obscure objects of Barnard, or the cosmic clouds of R.P. Hagen. Biannual prize established by a donation of Dorothea Klumpke Roberts in honor of her late husband Isaac Roberts. Prize awarded 1931–
- Prix Marcel Moye. Recognition of a young member of the Society for his or her observations. Individuals must be 25 years of age or less. Annual prize awarded 1946–.
- Prix Marius Jacquemetton. Recognition of a work or research by a member of the Society, a student, or a young astronomer. Annual prize awarded 1947–present.
- Prix Viennet - Damien. Recognition of a beautiful piece of optics or for some work in this branch of astronomy. Given in alternate years with the Prix Dorothea Klumpke-Isaac Roberts. Prize awarded 1949–
- Prix Julien Saget. Recognition of an amateur for his or her remarkable astronomical photography. Annual prize awarded 1969–present.
- Prix Edmond Girard. Encouragement for a beginning vocation in astronomy or scientific exploration of the sky above the Observatoire de Juvisy. Annual prize awarded 1974–.
- Prix Camus - Waitz. Named in honor of Jacques Camus and Michel Waitz. Awarded – present.
- Prix Marguerite Clerc. The condition of attribution of this prize is left to the discretion of the SAF Council.
- Prix International d'Astronautique. Recognition of a study of interplanetary travel/astronautics. Prize established by Robert Esnault-Pelterie and André-Louis Hirsch. Prior to 1936, it was known as the Prix Rep-Hirsch. Given when merited. Prize awarded 1928–1939.
- Médaille des Anciens Présidents. Awarded when merited.
- Médaille Commémorative. Annual prize awarded 1901–
- Médaille du Soixantenaire. Recognition of members who achieve 60 continuous years of membership. Awarded when merited.
- Plaquette du Centenaire de Camille Flammarion. Recognition of eminent service to the Society. Annual prize awarded 1956–.

The Parisian engraver Alphée Dubois (1831–1905) created several medals for the Société Astronomique de France, including the Medal of the Society "la Nuit étoilée" (1887), the Medal of the Prix des Dames (1896), the Medal of the Prix Janssen (1896), and the Society's Commemorative Medal.

== Presidents ==
- 1887–1889: Camille Flammarion, SAF founder, astronomer, author
- 1889–1891: Hervé Faye, astronomer
- 1892–1893: Anatole Bouquet de la Grye, hydrographic engineer, geographer, astronomer
- 1893–1895: Félix Tisserand, astronomer
- 1895–1897: Jules Janssen, astronomer
- 1897–1899: Alfred Cornu, physicist
- 1899–1901: Octave Callandreau, physicist
- 1901–1903: Henri Poincaré, mathematician, theoretical physicist, engineer, philosopher of science
- 1903–1904: Gabriel Lippmann, physicist, inventor
- 1905–1907: Chrétien Édouard Caspari, astronomer, hydrographic engineer
- 1907–1909: Henri-Alexandre Deslandres, astronomer
- 1909–1911: Benjamin Baillaud, astronomer
- 1911–1913: Pierre Puiseux, astronomer
- 1913–1919: Aymar de la Baume Pluvinel, astronomer
- 1919–1921: Paul Émile Appell, mathematician
- 1921–1923: Roland Bonaparte, French prince, President of the Société de Géographie
- 1923–1925: Charles Lallemand, geophysicist
- 1925–1927: Gustave-Auguste Ferrié, radio pioneer, army general
- 1927–1929: Eugène Fichot, hydrographer
- 1929–1931: Georges Perrier, army general, President of the Société de Géographie
- 1931–1933: Charles Fabry, physicist
- 1933–1935: Ernest Esclangon, astronomer, mathematician
- 1935–1937: Jules Baillaud, astronomer
- 1937–1939: Charles Maurain, geophysicist
- 1939–1945: Fernand Baldet, astronomer
- 1945–1947: Bernard Lyot, astronomer
- 1947–1949: André-Louis Danjon, astronomer
- 1949–1951: Lucien d'Azambuja, astronomer
- 1951–1953: Jean Cabannes, physicist
- 1953–1955: Pierre Chevenard, mining engineer
- 1955–1957: André Couder, astronomer, optical engineer
- 1957–1958: Albert Pérard, physicist, meteorologist
- 1958–1960: Jean Coulomb, geophysicist, mathematician
- 1960–1962: André Lallemand, astronomer
- 1962–1964: André-Louis Danjon, astronomer
- 1964–1966: Pierre Tardi, astronomer
- 1966–1970: Jean Rösch, astronomer
- 1970–1973: Jean Kovalevsky, astronomer
- 1973–1976: Jean-Claude Pecker, astronomer
- 1976–1979: Bruno Morando, astronomer
- 1979–1981: Audouin Dollfus, astronomer
- 1981–1984: Jacques Boulon, astronomer
- 1984–1987: Paul Simon, astronomer
- 1987–1993: Philippe de la Cotardière, writer, science journalist
- 1993–1997: Jean-Claude Ribes, radioastronomer
- 1997–2001: Roger Ferlet, astrophysicist
- 2001–2005: Patrick Guibert, engineer
- 2005–2014: Philippe Morel, medical doctor
- 2014–2021: Patrick Baradeau, historian, publisher
- 2021–2025: Sylvain Bouley, planetary scientist
- 2025–present: Roland Lehoucq, astrophysicist

== Asteroid (4162) SAF ==
French astronomer André Patry of the Observatoire de Nice named Asteroid (4162) SAF in the society's honor after he discovered the body on 24 November 1940.

Since the creation of SAF in 1887, more than 300 asteroids have been named in honor of the society's members.

== See also ==
- List of astronomical societies
- Societat Catalana de Gnomònica
