= Secretan (company) =

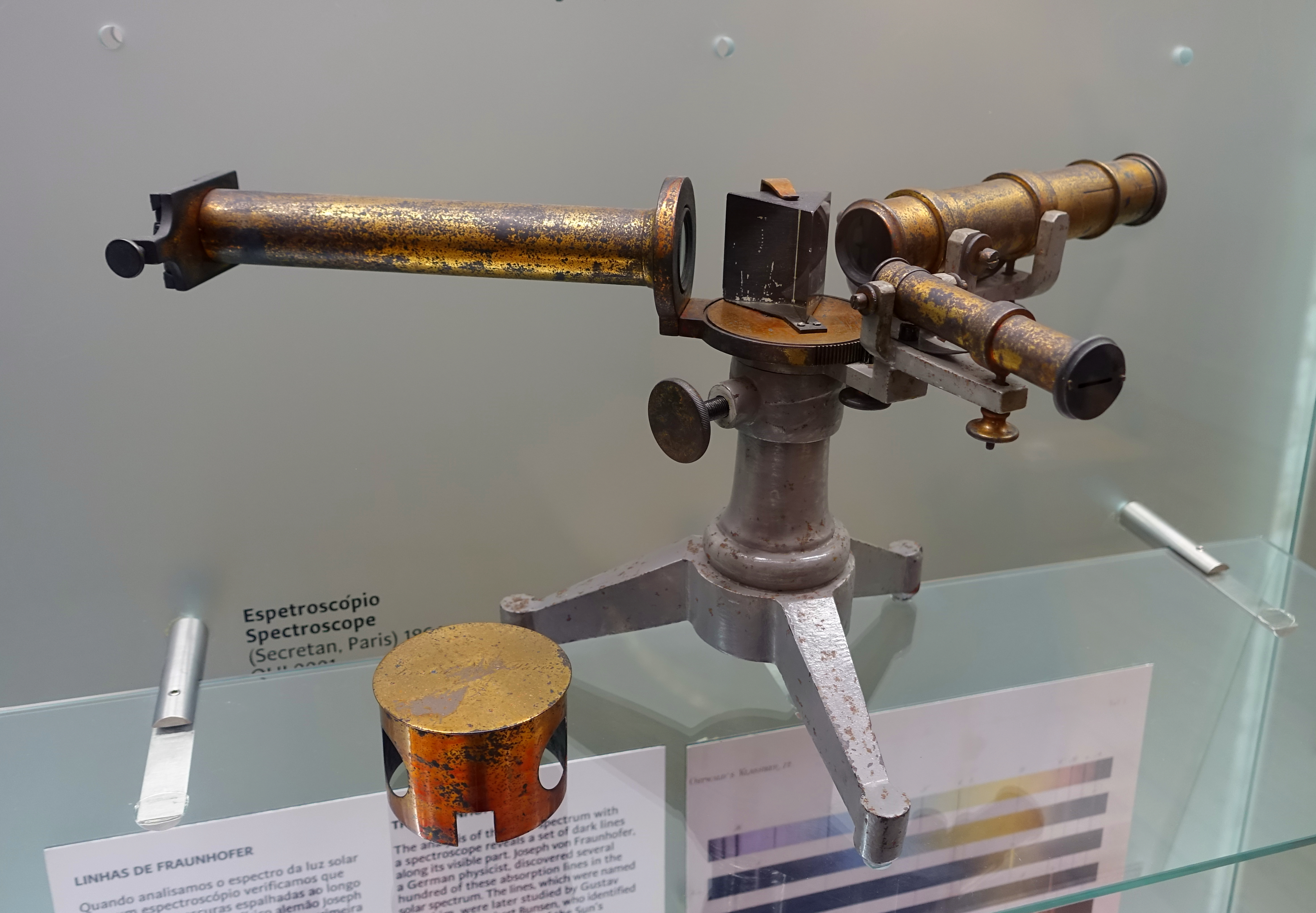
- Spectroscope by Secretan
- Company type: Private
- Industry: Optical instruments
- Predecessor: Lerebours & Secretan
- Founded: 1845; 181 years ago
- Founder: Marc Secretan
- Defunct: 1967
- Successor: Société de Recherches et de Perfectionnements Industriels (SRPI)
- Headquarters: Paris
- Number of locations: Paris, France
- Key people: Auguste Secretan, Georges Secretan, Paul Secretan, Alice Secretan
- Products: Telescopes and other optical / mechanical devices

Secretan was a company based in Paris, France that manufactured telescopes and other scientific instruments.

== History ==
In 1845, Marc Secretan (1804–1867), a Swiss mathematician, and Noël Paymal Lerebours (1807–1873), a French optician, established a firm in Paris that manufactured precision instruments. In 1854, Secretan became the sole owner of the company, which continued to operate under the name Lerebours & Secretan. With popular interest in astronomy growing, the French physicist Léon Foucault (1819–1868) entered into an exclusive contract with Secretan for the commercialization of a reflecting telescope. Upon the death of Secretan in 1867, the company’s management first passed to his son Auguste François (1833–1874), and then to Auguste’s cousin Georges Emmanuel Secrétan (1837–1906). Around 1889, Georges Secrétan moved the company’s workshops to 30 rue du Faubourg Saint-Jacques, near the Paris Observatory and appointed Raymond Augustin Mailhat (1862 – 1923) as their head from 1 January 1889. In 1894, Mailhat bought some of the workshops and set up his own business, while Secretan moved his equipment into a new location at 41, quai de l’Horloge, near to the company’s retail shop on the Place du Pont-Neuf. When Georges Secrétan died in 1906, his son Paul Victor (b. 1879) and daughter Alice (b. 1878) inherited the business, which they ran until 1911, when they sold it to Charles Épry. In 1913, Gustave Jacquelin (1879–1939) became Épry’s associate and the firm continued manufacturing and selling astronomical, scientific and optical products. In 1963, the Secretan company merged with the Henri Morin company, a producer of surveying and drawing equipment, and was renamed as the Etablissements H. Morin-Secretan. Around 1967, that firm merged with the Société de Recherches et de Perfectionnements Industriels (SRPI), which operated until at least 1981.

== See also ==
- Amateur astronomy
