= L'Astronomie =

French monthly astronomy magazine

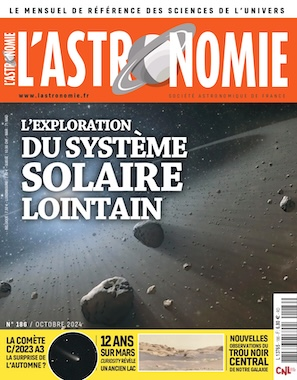
- Publication Director: Sylvain Bouley
- Editor-in-chief: Fabrice Mottez
- Categories: Astronomy
- Frequency: Monthly
- Publisher: Société astronomique de France
- Founder: Camille Flammarion
- First issue: January 1, 1883; 143 years ago
- Country: France
- Based in: Paris
- Language: French
- Website: http://lastronomie.fr/
- ISSN: 0004-6302
- OCLC: 702601870

L'Astronomie (French: [lastʁɔnɔmi]) is a monthly astronomy magazine published by the Société astronomique de France (SAF). Sylvain Bouley, the president of SAF, is the publication director and astronomer Fabrice Mottez is the editor-in-chief.

== History ==
The magazine was established by Camille Flammarion and the first issue, dated 1882, was published on January 1, 1883. After SAF was founded in 1887, a second journal was created, called the Bulletin mensuel de la Société Astronomique de France. The two publications existed in parallel up to 1894. In the December 1894 issue, Flammarion announced in an editorial that L'Astronomie would cease to exist. From January 1895 to December 1910, only the Bulletin de la Société Astronomique de France was published. Starting from 1912, the Bulletin was renamed L'Astronomie, while preserving the volume numbering of the Bulletin.

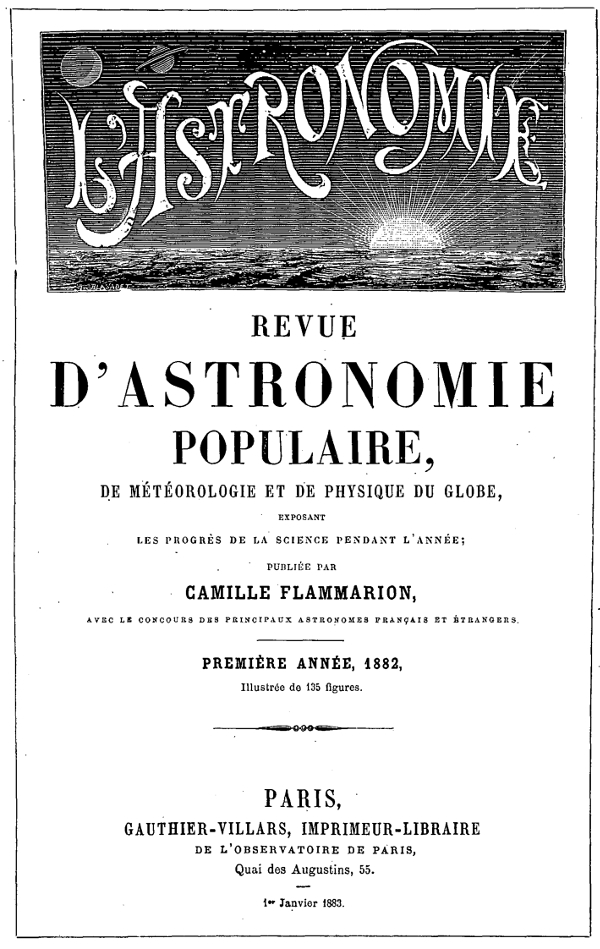
cover of first issue

== Distribution ==
The magazine is available by subscription both in France and internationally in hard copy and digital formats. It is also sold in newspaper kiosks and magazine stands in France, Belgium, Luxembourg, Switzerland and Morocco.

Electronic versions of L'Astronomie and Bulletin de la Société astronomique de France from 1882 to 1953 (except 1949) are available from the Bibliothèque nationale de France's Gallica website.
