= List of French astronomers =

The following are list of French astronomers, astrophysicists and other notable French people who have made contributions to the field of astronomy. They may have won major prizes or awards, developed or invented widely used techniques or technologies within astronomy, or are directors of major observatories or heads of space-based telescope projects.

== The list ==
The following is a list of notable French astronomers.

=== A ===
- Abba Mari ben Eligdor
- Jacques d'Allonville
- Marie Henri Andoyer
- Voituret Anthelme
- Pierre Antonini
- François Arago
- Henri Arnaut de Zwolle
- Jean Audouze
- Adrien Auzout

=== B ===
- Benjamin Baillaud
- Jules Baillaud
- Jean Sylvain Bailly
- Paul Baize
- Fernand Baldet
- Odette Bancilhon
- Daniel Barbier
- Joseph-Émile Barbier
- Aurélien Barrau
- Maria A. Barucci
- Aymar de la Baume Pluvinel
- Michel Benoist
- Bernard of Verdun
- Guillaume Bigourdan
- Immanuel Bonfils
- Jean-Marc Bonnet-Bidaud
- Alphonse Borrelly
- Jean Bosler
- Joseph Bossert
- François Bouchet
- Alexis Bouvard
- Louis Boyer
- P. Briault
- Ismaël Bullialdus
- Johann Karl Burckhardt

=== C ===
- Michel Cassé
- César-François Cassini de Thury
- Dominique, comte de Cassini
- Jacques Cassini
- Roger Cayrel
- Catherine Cesarsky
- Joseph Bernard de Chabert
- Jean Chacornac
- Merieme Chadid
- Daniel Chalonge
- Jean-Baptiste Chappe d'Auteroche
- Auguste Charlois
- Sébastien Charnoz
- Jean Chazy
- Olivier Chesneau
- Henri Chrétien
- Jean-Pierre Christin
- Alexis Clairaut
- Jérôme Eugène Coggia
- Françoise Combes
- Janine Connes
- Eugène Cosserat
- Pablo Cottenot
- André Couder
- Fernand Courty

=== D ===
- Joseph Lepaute Dagelet
- Michel Ferdinand d'Albert d'Ailly
- Marie-Charles Damoiseau
- André-Louis Danjon
- Antoine Darquier de Pellepoix
- Jean Baptiste Joseph Delambre
- Charles-Eugène Delaunay
- Joseph-Nicolas Delisle
- Gabriel Delmotte
- Audrey C. Delsanti
- Jules Alfred Pierrot Deseilligny
- Henri-Alexandre Deslandres
- Audouin Dollfus
- Jean Dufay
- Jeanne Dumée
- Noël Duret

=== E ===
- Ernest Esclangon

=== F ===
- Louis Fabry
- Pierre Fatou
- Hervé Faye
- Charles Fehrenbach
- Louis Feuillée
- Agnès Fienga
- Oronce Finé
- Camille Flammarion
- Gabrielle Renaudot Flammarion
- Honoré Flaugergues
- Jean Focas
- Georges Fournier

=== G ===
- Jean Baptiste Aimable Gaillot
- Jean-Félix Adolphe Gambart
- Pierre Gassendi
- Casimir Marie Gaudibert
- Gersonides
- Michel Giacobini
- Louis Godin
- François Gonnessiat

=== H ===
- Maurice Hamy
- Michel Hénon
- Paul Henry and Prosper Henry
- Pierre Hérigone
- Gustave-Adolphe Hirn

=== J ===
- Pierre Janssen
- Odette Jasse
- René Jarry-Desloges
- Stéphane Javelle
- Edme-Sébastien Jeaurat
- Benjamin Jekhowsky
- Robert Jonckhèere

=== K ===
- Samuel Kansi
- Dorothea Klumpke

=== L ===
- Philippe de La Hire
- Antoine Émile Henry Labeyrie
- Nicolas-Louis de Lacaille
- Joseph-Louis Lagrange
- Joanny-Philippe Lagrula
- Jérôme Lalande
- Marie-Jeanne de Lalande
- Michel Lefrançois de Lalande
- André Lallemand
- Félix Chemla Lamèch
- Pierre-Simon Laplace
- Jacques Laskar
- Marguerite Laugier
- Paul-Auguste-Ernest Laugier
- Joseph Jean Pierre Laurent
- Jean Le Fèvre
- Guillaume Le Gentil
- Pierre Charles Le Monnier
- Urbain Le Verrier
- Nicole-Reine Lepaute
- Edmond Modeste Lescarbault
- Emmanuel Liais
- Jean-Baptiste Lislet Geoffroy
- Maurice Loewy
- Jean-Pierre Luminet
- Bernard Lyot

=== M ===
- Louis Maillard
- Jean-Jacques d'Ortous de Mairan
- Giacomo F. Maraldi
- Giovanni Domenico Maraldi
- Claude-Louis Mathieu
- Pierre Louis Maupertuis
- Alain Maury
- Victor Mauvais
- Pierre Méchain
- Jean-Claude Merlin
- Charles Messier
- François Mignard
- Gaston Millochau
- Henri Mineur
- Antonio Mizauld
- Théophile Moreux
- Jean-Baptiste Morin (mathematician)
- Ernest Mouchez

=== N ===
- Charles Nordmann

=== P ===
- André Patry
- Jean-Claude Pecker
- Nicolas-Claude Fabri de Peiresc
- Julien Peridier
- Henri Joseph Anastase Perrotin
- Frédéric Petit
- Pierre Petit (engineer)
- Jean Picard
- Louise du Pierry
- Alexandre Guy Pingré
- Christian Pollas
- Jean-Louis Pons
- Philippe Gustave le Doulcet, Comte de Pontécoulant
- Jean-Loup Puget
- Pierre Puiseux

=== Q ===
- Ferdinand Quénisset

=== R ===
- Georges Rayet
- Jean Richer
- Édouard Roche
- Pierre Rousseau
- Augustin Royer
- Lucien Rudaux

=== S ===
- Nicolas Sarrabat
- Félix Savary
- Evry Schatzman
- Alexandre Schaumasse
- Alfred Schmitt
- Jean-François Séguier
- Achille Pierre Dionis du Séjour
- Édouard Stephan
- Frédéric Sy
- Pope Sylvester II

=== T ===
- Agop Terzan
- Louis Thollon
- Félix Tisserand
- Étienne Léopold Trouvelot

=== V ===
- Jacques Vallée
- Joseph Gaultier de la Vallette
- Benjamin Valz
- Gérard de Vaucouleurs
- Philippe Véron
- Pierre-Antoine Véron
- Yvon Villarceau

=== W ===
- Charles Wolf

== See also ==
- List of women astronomers
- List of Russian astronomers and astrophysicists
