= NGC 2320 =

Galaxy in the constellation Lynx

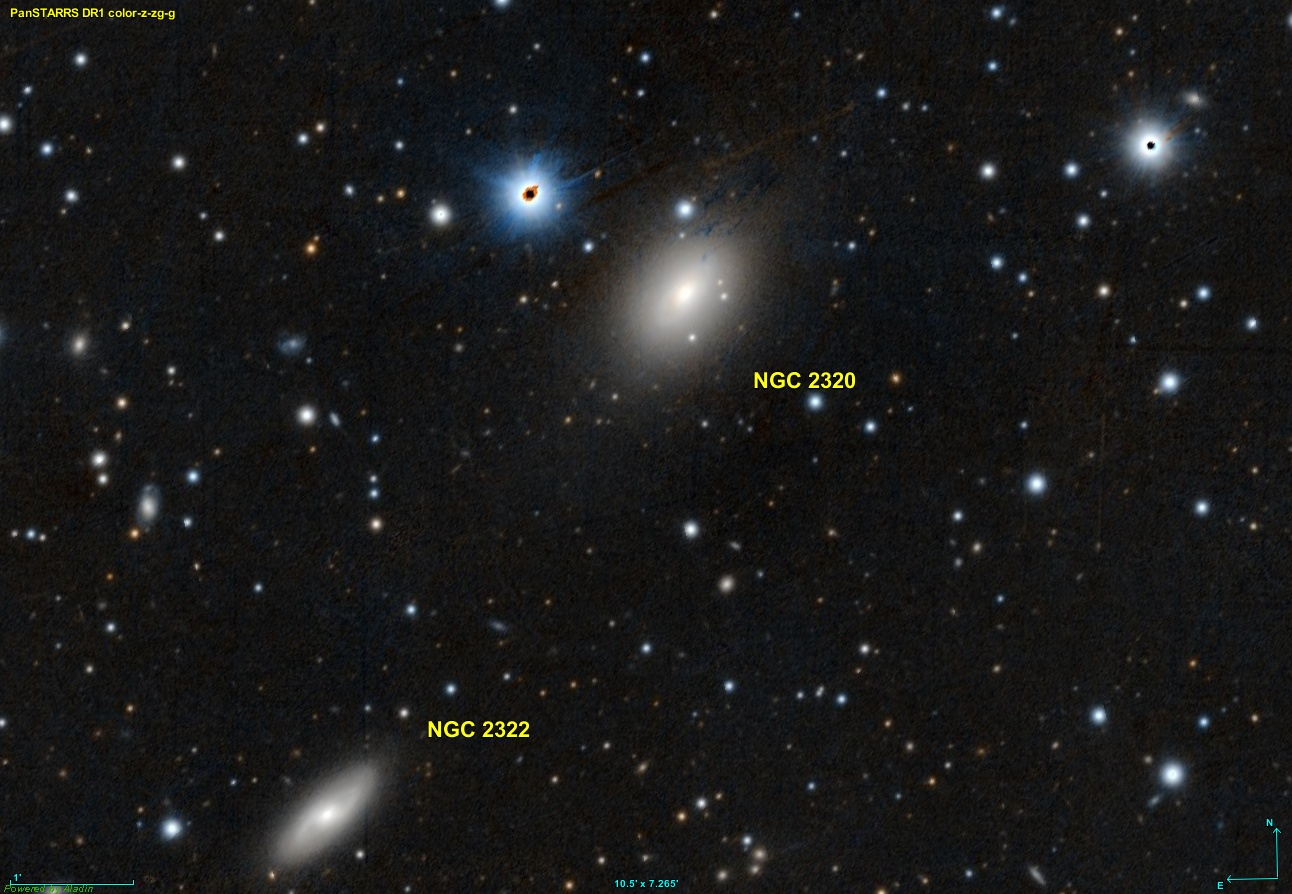
- NGC 2320 and NGC 2322 imaged by Pan-STARRS

Observation data (J2000 epoch)
- Constellation: Lynx
- Right ascension: 07^{h} 05^{m} 42.0193^{s}
- Declination: +50° 34′ 51.648″
- Redshift: 0.019827±0.0000500
- Heliocentric radial velocity: 5,944±15 km/s
- Distance: 278.44 ± 19.72 Mly (85.371 ± 6.045 Mpc)
- Group or cluster: [CHM2007] HDC 426
- Apparent magnitude (V): 12.9

Characteristics
- Type: E
- Size: ~188,500 ly (57.78 kpc) (estimated)
- Apparent size (V): 1.4′ × 0.8′

Other designations
- IRAS F07019+5039, 2MASX J07054202+5034519, UGC 3659, MCG +08-13-051, PGC 20136, CGCG 234-047

NGC 2320 is an elliptical galaxy in the constellation of Lynx. Its velocity with respect to the cosmic microwave background is 6,020±16 km/s, which corresponds to a Hubble distance of 289.6 ± 20.3 Mly (88.80 ± 6.22 Mpc). However, 14 non-redshift measurements give a closer mean distance of 278.44 ± 19.72 Mly (85.371 ± 6.045 Mpc). It was discovered by German-British astronomer William Herschel on 28 December 1790.

NGC 2320 is a radio galaxy, i.e. it has giant regions of radio emission extending well beyond its visible structure.

== HDC 426 Group ==
NGC 2320 is a member of a group of galaxies known as [CHM2007] HDC 426. This group contains 18 galaxies, including NGC 2315, NGC 2321, NGC 2322, NGC 2326, NGC 2332, NGC 2340, IC 458, and IC 465. NGC 2320 is also a member of the galaxy cluster Abell 569.

== Supernova ==
One supernova has been observed in NGC 2320:

- SN 2000B (Type Ia, mag. 16.5) was discovered by French amateur astronomer Pierre Antonini on 11 January 2000.

== See also ==
- List of NGC objects (2001–3000)
