= NGC 2326 =

Galaxy in the constellation Lynx

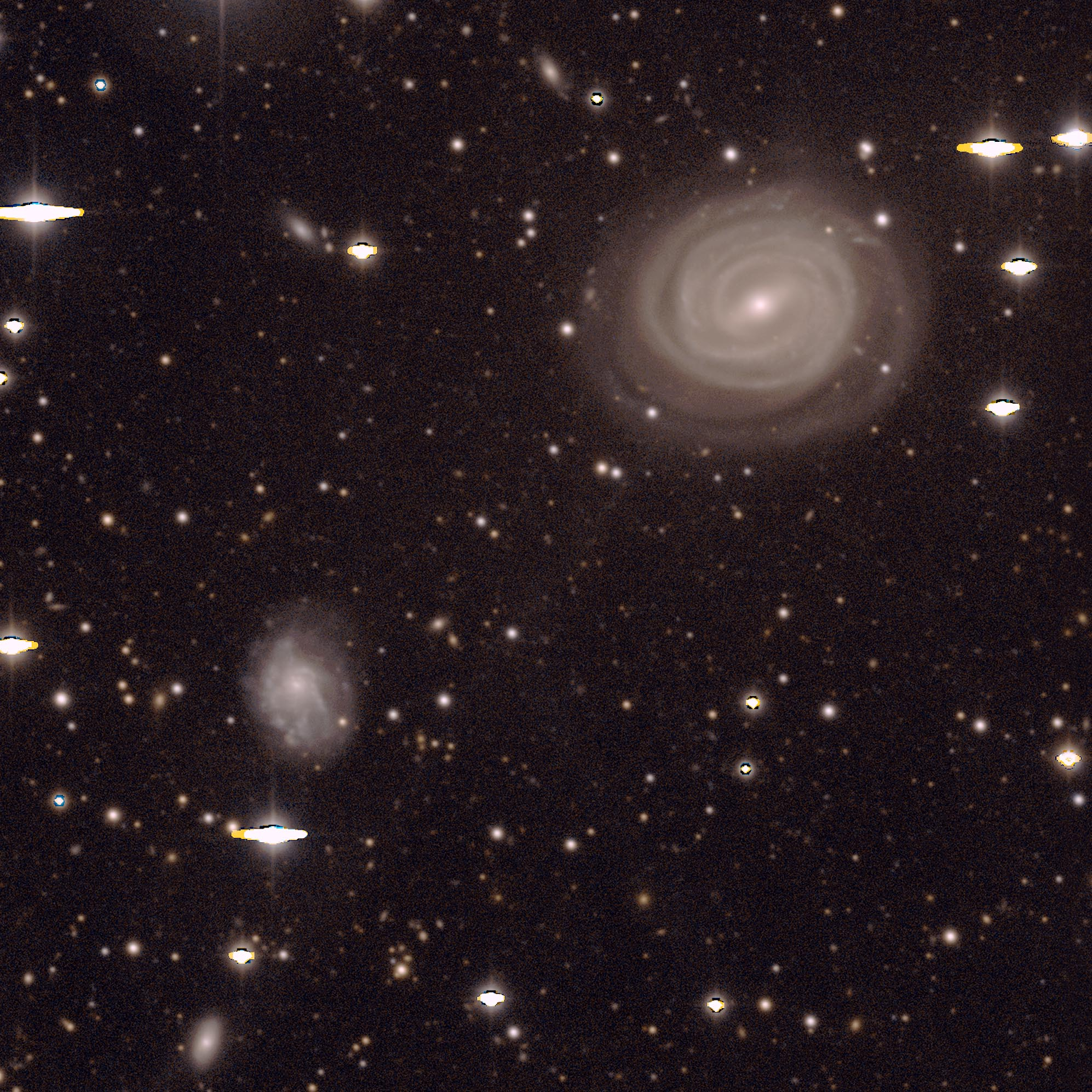
- NGC 2326 (top right) and NGC 2326A (UGC 3687) with legacy surveys

Observation data (J2000 epoch)
- Constellation: Lynx
- Right ascension: 07^{h} 08^{m} 11.0037^{s}
- Declination: +50° 40′ 54.994″
- Redshift: 0.019960
- Heliocentric radial velocity: 5924 km/s
- Distance: 291.6 ± 20.4 Mly (89.41 ± 6.26 Mpc)
- Apparent magnitude (V): 13.2
- Apparent magnitude (B): 14.3

Characteristics
- Type: SB(rs)b
- Size: ~267,500 ly (82.01 kpc) (estimated)
- Apparent size (V): 1.9′ × 1.8′

Other designations
- IRAS F07043+5045, UGC 3681, MCG +08-13-062, PGC 20218, CGCG 234-060

NGC 2326 is a barred spiral galaxy in the constellation Lynx. Its velocity with respect to the cosmic microwave background is 6062 ± 11 km/s, which corresponds to a Hubble distance of 291.6 ± 20.4 Mly (89.41 ± 6.26 Mpc). It was discovered by William Herschel on 9 February 1788. Its apparent magnitude is 14.3 and its size is 2.71 arc minutes. It is located near NGC 2326A.

The SIMBAD database lists NGC 2326 as a radio galaxy, i.e. it has giant regions of radio emission extending well beyond its visible structure.

== HDC 426 Group ==
NGC 2326 is a member of a group of galaxies known as [CHM2007] HDC 426. This group contains 18 galaxies, including NGC 2315, NGC 2320, NGC 2321, NGC 2322, NGC 2332, NGC 2340, IC 458, and IC 465. NGC 2326 is also a member of the galaxy cluster Abell 569.

== Supernova ==
One supernova has been observed in NGC 2326. SN 2023pgb (Type II, mag. 17.44) was discovered by the Zwicky Transient Facility on 12 August 2023.

== See also ==
- List of NGC objects (2001–3000)
