= Francisco Miranda da Costa Lobo =

Portuguese astronomer (1864–1945)

- Born: 18 February 1864; Vinhais, Portugal
- Died: 29 April 1945 (aged 81); Coimbra, Portugal
- Awards: Janssen Medal (1926)

Francisco Miranda da Costa Lobo (18 February 1864 – 29 April 1945) was a Portuguese astronomer, known as a pioneer of spectrography and of cinematographical observations in solar astronomy.

Da Costa Lobo spent his career as a professor at the University of Coimbra and the director of the University's astronomical observatory.

He installed a spectroheliograph modelled closely on the one at Meudon, working in close touch with Professor Deslandres and M. d'Azambuja. In the design of the Costa Lôbo stellar spectrograph he acknowledged the help of Sir David Gill. The instrument is an objective prism spectrograph equatorially mounted, and convertible into an ordinary equatorial by removing the prism and the system of reflectors in the finder, which was used to produce a deviation in the beam corresponding to that of the prism.

Da Costa Lobo developed his own "radiant" theory based on Le Sage's theory of gravitation and was a "radical critic of relativity and quantum theories".

He was three times an invited speaker at the International Congress of Mathematicians — in Strasbourg in 1920, in Toronto in 1924), and in Zürich in 1932. His honors include Grand Cross of Alfonso XII, Commander of the Legion d'Honneur, and Foreign Member of the Pontifical Academy of Sciences.
