= NGC 2315 =

Galaxy in the constellation Lynx

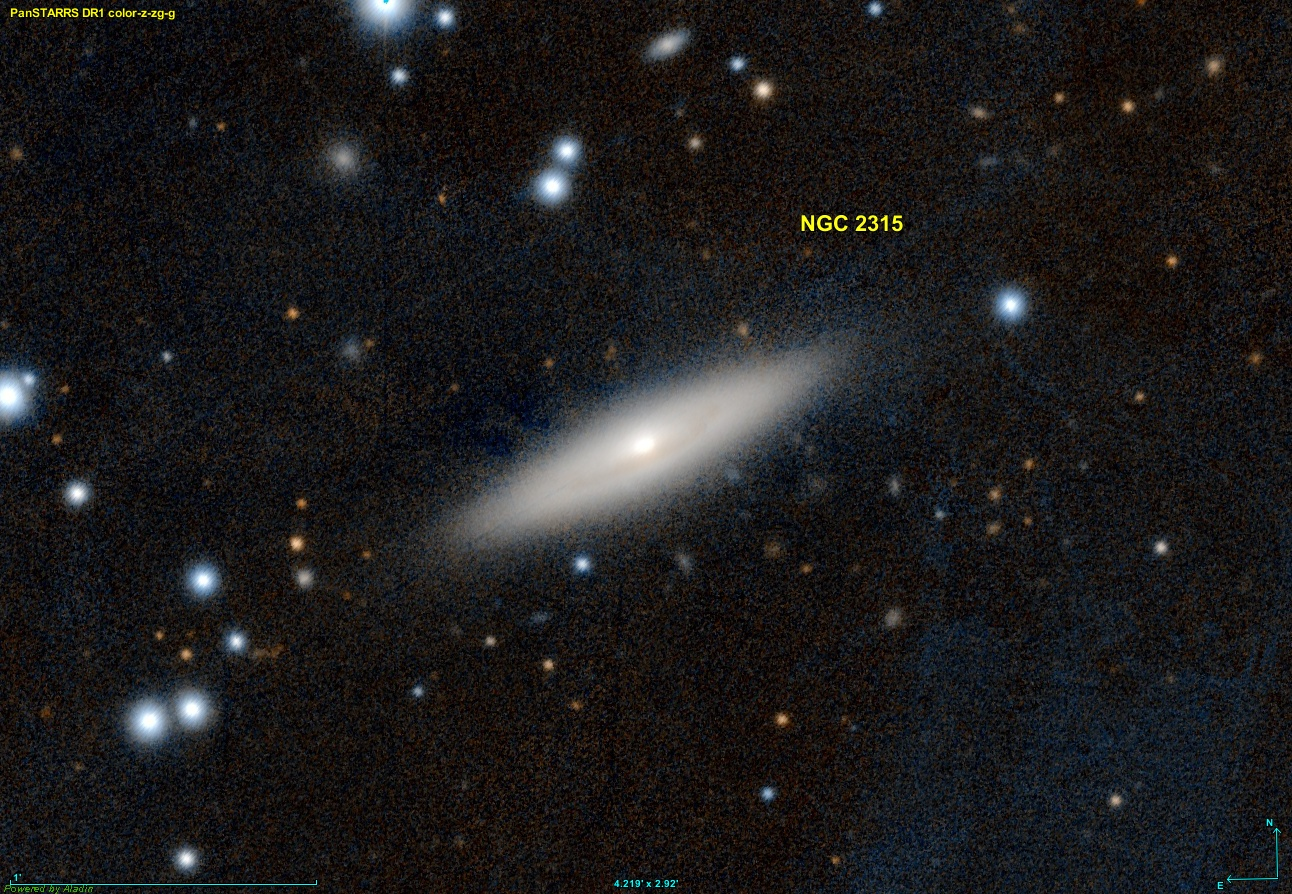
- NGC 2315 imaged by Pan-STARRS

Observation data (J2000 epoch)
- Constellation: Lynx
- Right ascension: 07^{h} 02^{m} 33.0779^{s}
- Declination: +50° 35′ 25.930″
- Redshift: 0.021000±0.000200
- Heliocentric radial velocity: 6,296±60 km/s
- Distance: 306.4 ± 21.8 Mly (93.94 ± 6.69 Mpc)
- Group or cluster: LDC 484
- Apparent magnitude (V): 14.57

Characteristics
- Type: S0/a
- Size: ~186,200 ly (57.08 kpc) (estimated)
- Apparent size (V): 1.3′ × 0.4′

Other designations
- IRAS F06587+5039, 2MASX J07023303+5035261, UGC 3633, MCG +08-13-045, PGC 20045, CGCG 234-041

NGC 2315 is a lenticular galaxy in the constellation of Lynx. Its velocity with respect to the cosmic microwave background is 6,369±60 km/s, which corresponds to a Hubble distance of 306.4 ± 21.8 Mly (93.94 ± 6.69 Mpc). It was discovered by British astronomer John Herschel on 16 February 1831.

NGC 2315 is a radio galaxy, i.e. it has giant regions of radio emission extending well beyond its visible structure. It also has a possible active galactic nucleus, i.e. it has a compact region at the center of a galaxy that emits a significant amount of energy across the electromagnetic spectrum, with characteristics indicating that this luminosity is not produced by the stars.

== LDC 484 Group ==
NGC 2315 is a member of a group of galaxies known as LDC 484. This group contains 47 galaxies, including NGC 2320, NGC 2321, NGC 2322, NGC 2326, NGC 2329, NGC 2332, NGC 2340, IC 458, and IC 465.

== Supernova ==
One supernova has been observed in NGC 2315:

- SN 2011ay (Type Iax, mag. 17.8) was discovered by the Lick Observatory Supernova Search (LOSS) on 18 March 2011. It was initially classified as Type Ia-pec, but later anaylsis concluded that it was Type Iax.

== See also ==
- List of NGC objects (2001–3000)
