= Combat effectiveness =

Effectiveness of a military force

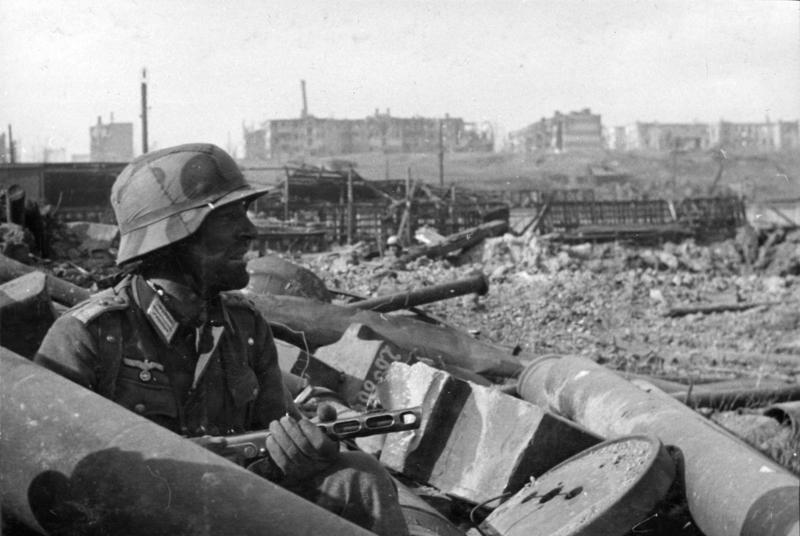
Soldier in cover between rubble during the Battle of Stalingrad, 1942

Combat effectiveness is the capacity or performance of a military force to succeed in undertaking an operation, mission or objective. Determining optimal combat effectiveness is crucial in the armed forces, whether they are deployed on land, air or sea. Combat effectiveness is an aspect of military effectiveness and can be attributed to the strength of combat support including the quality and quantity of logistics, weapons and equipment as well as military tactics, the psychological states of soldiers, level of influence of leaders, skill and motivation that can arise from nationalism to survival are all capable of contributing to success on the battlefield. Combat effectiveness is a function of these factors. Overall combat effectiveness or combat power is the product of a forces strength and the combat effectiveness of that force. Combat effectiveness explains how a numerically weak force can prevail over another that is much stronger. It also explains how relatively small units can have a significant impact on the outcome of a conflict.

== Quantitative measures ==
Philip Hayward proposes a measure for combat effectiveness, concentrating on the "probability of success" in a combat environment in relation to factors such as manpower and military stratagem. Combat effectiveness can be represented as a real and continuous function, $F(x) \geqq F(y)$ where $x$ and $y$ are two distinct military units. He analyses the measure against three main factors: capabilities—the quality and quantity of human and material resources of both friendly and enemy forces; environment—weather and terrain; and missions—region to hold in the specified objective and the latest time to do it while minimising the costs of achieving the objective. Hayward defines $\bar{P(S)}$ to be the average probability of success in combat, summarised as $\bar{P(S)} = \int f(x,z)p(z) dz=G(x)$ where $x$ is the capabilities of friendly forces, $z$ is the other factors, and $p(z)$ is the probability of situation $z$ occurring in combat.

Another measure for combat effectiveness is developed by Youngwoo Lee and Taesik Lee who use a "meta-network representation" approach with regards to the opportunities available for military units to make an attack. The number of enemy casualties is one of the main indicators of success in combat and was used by the United States army in the Vietnam and Korean wars. According to Lee and Lee, there are two types of direct engagements with enemy forces in the network model: isolated attacks and coordinated attacks. Let $A_1$ and $A_2$ be two friendly force units and $B$ be an enemy unit. In an isolated attack between $A_1$ and $B$, $A_1$ must carry out the responsibility of both detecting and advancing on $B$. On the other hand, a coordinated attack allows $A_2$ to communicate the detection of $B$ to $A_1$ if $A_1$ does not have the capability or is not in a position to detect $B$. If $A_1$ is in a position to engage $B$, $A_1$ may carry out the attack through the organisation between the two friendly forces. Lee and Lee say that more complex combat situations can see these networks expand to include more combat units, locations, capabilities and actions, but the base structure is of an isolated or coordinated attack structure. The larger the network, the greater chance of opportunities for offensive action to become available.

== Psychological factors ==
The cohesiveness of the relationships formed between soldiers can affect their performance in combat and help them realise common goals. Cohesion relates to motivation and a group becomes stronger as they become more motivated. The organisation or structure of a military unit can contribute to cohesion, as William Henderson wrote in his work, Cohesion: The Human Element in Combat : a small unit creates stronger bonds between its members than a larger one and the higher the frequency of their interactions with one another, the stronger the bond. Soldiers become aware of the distinction between their groups through the structured associations between them.

During wartime, resources and supplies including food, medical aid and technical equipment may be limited which can affect a military unit's resilience. As well as access to a sufficient level of resources, the adequate fulfilment of social needs aids survival in periods of hardship. Henderson states that soldiers turn to their peers for mental support in the absence of family or other influences from home and as the unit becomes more cohesive, its members devote greater effort into maintaining and improving their goals. Johan M.G van der Dennen says they are more readily able to endure combat through the camaraderie formed from the need for comfort from peers and understanding of their shared suffering. Soldiers may endure combat for personal reasons including survival which, in most circumstances, is obtained from the survival of their group and fear of social exclusion from it can spur their motivation for group cooperation.

Henderson states that some soldiers may experience the urge to desert their duties or responsibilities for the return to civilian life before the duration of their service ends—if there are ways of attaining escape from service with little consequence or light punishment, a soldier's devotion to their unit may decrease. Soldiers who are unwilling to fight may face consequences of sanctions and in rare circumstances they are prosecuted for the refusal of deployment such as the case with British military members, Lance Corporal Glenton and Flight Lieutenant Kendall-Smith, who were charged and faced imprisonment for refusing to return to their deployments in Afghanistan and Iraq.

The level of a unit's morale and motivation can give them needed leverage in combat situations. This leverage is also advantageous if their fighting force is not strong in numbers. Sergio Catignani comments that the system of values an army upholds can boost morale and improve motivation. As an example, the Israeli Defence Force aims to uphold the values of "responsibility," "credibility," "professionalism" and "sense of mission." They place emphasis on strengthening the cohesion and spirit of their units through the oath a soldier takes at the beginning of their military service. Oaths for some brigades are taken at historically significant locations such as the Western Wall in Jerusalem where the 1948 Arab–Israeli War occurred, to reinforce accomplishments of past comrades. Leonard Wainstein says morale may be threatened by sudden or traumatic losses. These losses may involve individuals of a military force turned into casualties by their own weapons such as artillery and mines. The death of a commander could have a large effect on their unit as they are relied upon to lead. Morale can also be undermined by individual level factors such as fatigue resulting from a lack of sleep, fear, and stress.

== Technical expertise ==
The abilities of a soldier such as their skill in utilising firearms, tactics and communications can affect their success in accomplishing a mission, and is described by Kirstin J. H. Brathwaite in Effective in Battle: Conceptualizing Soldiers' Combat Effectiveness: the quality of communication between combat units are a determinant of how organised the mission will be while weapons handling and tactics employed determine the execution of the mission itself.

The Australian and New Zealand Army Corps (ANZAC) in World War I comprised a mix of soldiers with different levels of training. In the 1st Australian Division, 15% of the division was made of nineteen to twenty-year-old military men, 27% had served previously and 41% had no prior military experience. In February 1915, the 1st Australian Division were in Egypt, engaging in brigade exercises and moving into the battalion. At the same time, the 2nd Australian and New Zealand Division practised division-level exercises including marching and entrenching. No corps-level exercises nor combined arms training was undertaken by either division. The ANZACs did not use naval gunfire proficiently or communicate messages proficiently. In Malaya during World War II, the 8th Australian Division fought alongside India and Britain against Japanese forces. The headquarters of the 8th Australian Division issued instructions for training their soldiers to prepare for harsh jungle conditions and soldiers were able to coordinate their attacks, took initiative in patrolling and utilising guerrilla tactics and were able to adapt to their opponent's infiltration tactics.

=== Tactics ===
Effective military tactics involve the consideration of different forms of terrain, enemy, surrounding dangers and the physical states of soldiers. Effective tactics are adaptable and flexible in the sense that the commander in charge of executing a military plan can adapt it to conform with changing situations such as an enemy's reactions.

==== Ancient tactics ====
The Romans used conquered land to expand their military force up to 40,000 men by the First Punic War and distinct military formation to gain an advantage over opposing armies. This formation consisted of heavy and light infantry situated in the front and rear lines, each unit separated by a gap that was covered by the line before them, and the front lines took the brunt of the attack. The rear line was only called to assist if their preceding ones failed. The front lines could use the open order formation to retreat behind the rear and allow them to take charge. In ancient China, the country's geographical landscape influenced the ways armies fought battles. Rivers and mountain ranges that divided the land could be used to defend cities or towns. The terrain of valleys allowed ambushing soldiers at great heights to roll enormous stones onto armies passing below. During the Western Zhou dynasty, war chariots were used in conflicts with up to 500 allocated to an army. Chariot warfare was superseded by a focus on military strategy in the Warring States era. Such strategies involved deception and trickery in the midst or confusion of battle.

==== Modern tactics ====
During World War I, British tactics consisted of concise objectives, large quantities of artillery and tools which involved the introduction of gas, trench mortars and wireless signals for communication. In the 9th (Scottish) Division during the Battle of Loos, there were four battalions that were separated into three sections, one in front of the other, and each battalion had another behind it in the same formation. The standard layout of the lines consisted of at least six men and the formation was adopted in most battles of the war such as the Battle of the Somme. Trench raiding was developed in World War I where surprise attacks were made on the enemy, usually at night for the purposes of stealth. Soldiers were equipped for light and stealthy manoeuvre through the trenches and were commonly equipped with bayonets, trench knives, homemade clubs and brass knuckles. The main intention of the raids was to eliminate enemies as silently as possible until the enemy trench was secured.

Stephen Biddle argues that states that master and use the "modern system" of force employment have greater battlefield performance. The modern system of force employment entails interrelated techniques at the tactical level (cover and concealment, dispersion and small-unit independent maneuvers, suppression, and integration of weapon types), and at the operational level (depth, reserves and differential concentration). Biddle rejects that merely possessing superior military capabilities confers a battlefield advantage, arguing that combat effectiveness is in large part due to non-material variables, such as the tactics deployed.

Research has found that barrier troops can prevent some soldiers from fleeing the battlefield, but comes with substantial adverse effects (such as higher casualties and reduced initiative) that make it bad for combat effectiveness on the whole. According to Jason Lyall, barrier troops are more likely to be used by the militaries of states that discriminate against the ethnic groups that comprise the state's military.

== Leadership ==
Effective leaders reinforce the chain of command and are required to possess the fast decision-making skills necessary especially in high pressure environments both on the battlefield and in training. Effective military leadership requires leaders to maintain considerations such as the material welfare of their troops and they are expected to overcome obstacles and utilise their strengths. A member of the Holy Roman Imperial Forces, Gerat Barry, states in a 1634 military manual that some attributes of a commander include extensive military experience, courage, skill, authority and empathy.

During World War I, German intelligence noted the difference between two British platoons in a German raid on the Royal Irish Rifles in 1916 wherein one platoon performed better than the other. The better platoon was led by British officer Lieutenant Hill who inspired his troops to continue fighting while the other platoon which had less leadership surrendered. In 1914, a medical officer named William Tyrrell noted that many soldiers experienced mental breakdowns after their officer experienced one. In World War II, General George C. Marshall prepared the U.S. Army for modern war by managing the organisational aspect of the Army including improving the Army's relations with their affiliates and improving its organisational efficiency. During the English Civil War in 1642, military leaders such as Cromwell, Fairfax and Lambert held moral authority over their troops who had confidence in their leadership and were highly motivated and prepared for battle. By 1648, the New Model Army had high combat effectiveness and military expertise.

A 2025 study by Jason Lyall and Yuri Zhukov found that violence and intimidation of one's own troops to force reluctant soldiers to fight was likely to harm combat effectiveness.

== Logistics and firepower ==
=== Ancient ===
In ancient times, adequate supplies of consumables including food and water for both men and animals was considered a basic aspect of military success, strategically and tactically. Donald Engels comments that an adequate supply could support the morale and combat potential of an army. There were limitations to the load carried by pack animals in past militaries. The limitations varied depending on the type of animal and its travelling speed, the amount of time needed for the animal to travel throughout the campaign, the weight to be carried, weather and terrain. Weight needed to be distributed evenly on either side of the animal to avoid losing them to injury and overworking them. Additionally, food needed to be transported for both men and animals and if they were not sufficiently fed, they would struggle to perform tasks effectively and efficiently. In terms of artillery and weapons used in Greece and Rome, a wide range of war machines such as siege towers and siege engines, rams and throwing machines were advantageous to armies during the period between 70 BC to 15 AD when fighting against those who were less technologically advanced. Throwing machines posed as useful and versatile tools that were used not only in sieges but open battlefields and infantry support weapons. Throwing machines include the ballista which was a torsion machine operated by a crew of two people including the catapult and carroballista.

=== Modern ===
==== 19th and 20th centuries ====
In the early 19th century, weapons in general use included large-calibre ordnance, breech-loading artillery, muskets and armoured warships that were powered by steam. Western countries such as the United States and France could produce transport, ammunition, food supplies and other resources with more ease than the period before the Industrial Revolution. In the 19th and the 20th centuries, improved means of communication were introduced in the forms of radio, television, high-performance computer systems and telephones. Radio communication was one of the main forms of communication used on the battlefield. It became a factor for the Allied victory in the First World War when codebreakers were able to decode the radio communications of German, Japanese and Italian forces. Firepower grew from the 20th century since the number of soldiers and battle equipment increased rapidly. During the American Civil War, an infantry division had around 5,000 soldiers with up to 24 pieces of artillery, and the numbers grew by World War II, when an American division had up to 15,000 soldiers with 328 pieces of artillery. In 1918, on the Western Front, artillery of the Allied Forces became a major weapon suppressing enemy defences. Aerial photographic reconnaissance, flash-spotting and sound-ranging improved target acquisition and could predict map-shooting. The maintenance of operating histories for each gun had an improved accuracy since each weapon could be individually calibrated in reference to factors of weather such as wind speed, wind direction, humidity, and temperature.

==== 21st century ====
In the United States, improvements in support vehicles and packaging for shipping allowed for greater mobility of U.S. forces. During the Iraq War, radio frequency identification tags (RFID) provided unique codes for packages and systems and were attached to small radio transponders. The tags allowed for the speedy updates of online databases worldwide. Armoured uniforms have been developed to protect soldiers from incoming bullets and damage from explosions as well as military robots to aid in reconnaissance and bomb disposal.

== Domestic political factors ==
A number of scholars have posited that domestic political factors strongly affect the skills, cohesion, will, and organizational structures of military organizations, with implications for their combat effectiveness. The implication of this scholarship is that military capabilities are not necessarily the key determinant of combat effectiveness. In a 2010 study, Michael Beckley pushed on this scholarship, finding that economic development (an indicator) of power was a strong predictor of victory in war, and that factors such as "democracy, Western culture, high levels of human capital, and amicable civil-military relations" were not consequential.

=== Civil-military relations ===
Civil-military relations may shape combat effectiveness, as adverse civil-military relations can lead to poor strategic assessments, and undermine battlefield flexibility and survivability. When regimes are concerned about the prospects of coups, military organizations may be constructed in a way so as to reduce the risk of a coup (through "coup-proofing"), but this limits the conventional military capabilities of those military organizations.

=== Military inequality ===
According to research by Jason Lyall, state discrimination against the ethnic groups that comprise the state's military adversely affects the military's battlefield performance. In societies where ethnic groups are marginalized or repressed, militaries struggle to simultaneously obtain cohesion and combat power, as the soldiers will lack belief in a shared common purpose, as well as lower trust. Lyall shows that as a state's pre-war ethnic repression and marginalization is higher, the military will have greater casualties, mass defections, and mass desertions. Such militaries will also be more likely to use barrier troops. It is not ethnic diversity that undermines battlefield performance, but whether ethnic groups are discriminated against. Elizabeth Kier similarly argued in 1995 that the U.S. military's discrimination against LGBT service members undermined U.S. military readiness.

=== Regime type ===
According to Allan C. Stam and Dan Reiter, liberal democracies have an advantage in battlefield performance than non-democracies and illiberal democracies. They argue that this democratic advantage is derived from the fact that democratic soldiers fight harder, democratic states tend to ally together in war, and democracies can employ more economic resources towards combat. However, critics argue that democracy itself makes little difference in war and that some other factors, such as overall power, determine whether a country would achieve victory or face defeat. In some cases, such as the Vietnam War, democracy may even have contributed to defeat. Jasen Castillo argues that autocratic states may in certain circumstances have an advantage over democracies; for example, authoritarian regimes may have ideologies that require unconditional loyalty, which may contribute to military cohesion.

=== Organizational culture ===
Scholars such as Elizabeth Kier and Jeffrey Legro argue that organizational cultures in the military shape military doctrines.

=== Military medicine ===
According to a 2025 study, which examined inter-state wars from 1900 onwards, found that militaries that have better military medicine have improved military effectiveness.
