= Louis Maillard =

Louis Maillard may refer to:

- Louis Maillard (astronomer) (1867–1938), French-born Swiss astronomer
- Louis Camille Maillard (1878–1936), French physician and chemist
