= Combat =

Purposeful violent conflict

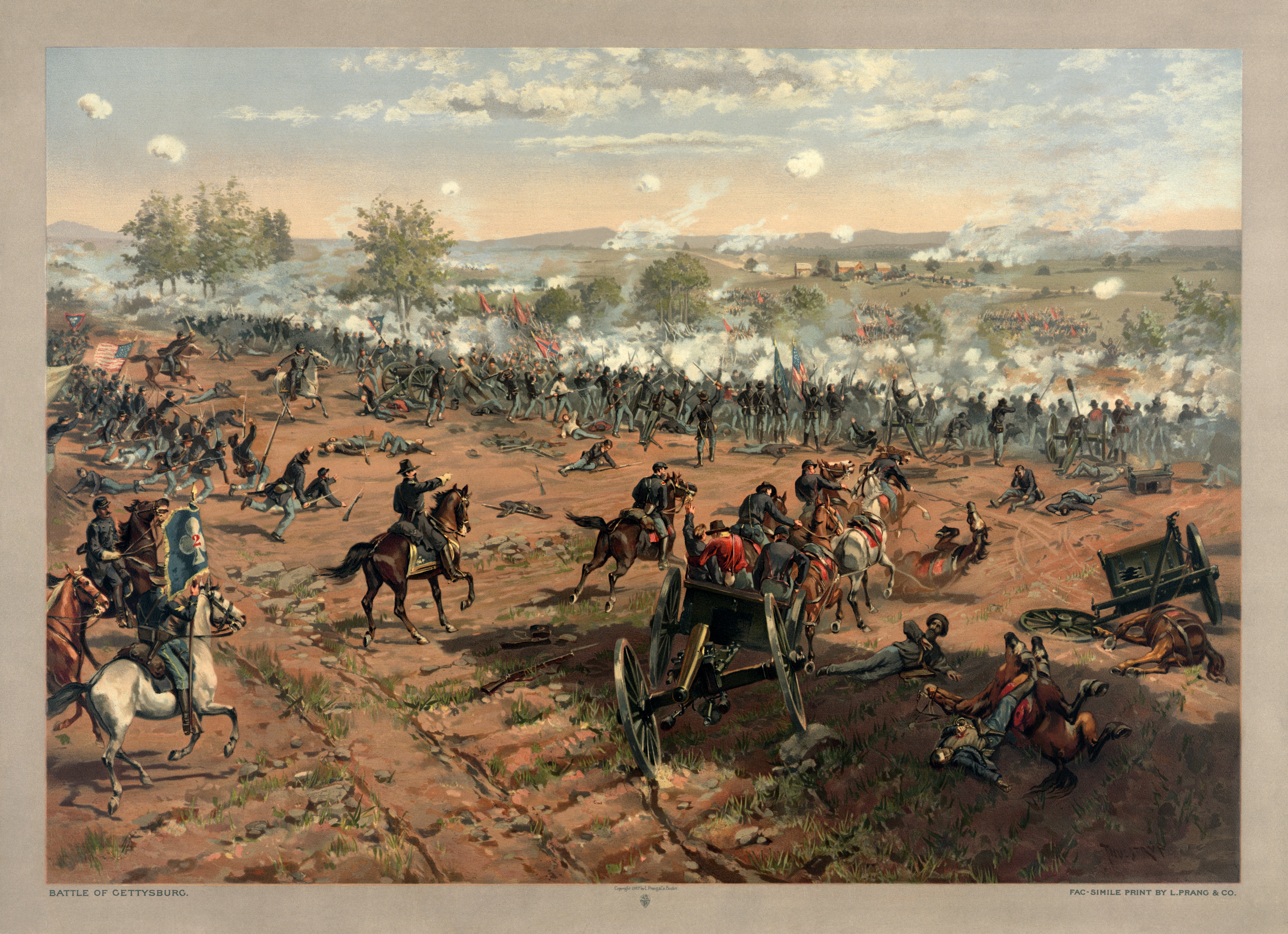
Ground combat: The Battle of Gettysburg by Thure de Thulstrup, depicting the Union Army and Confederate Army clashing during the American Civil War, 1863

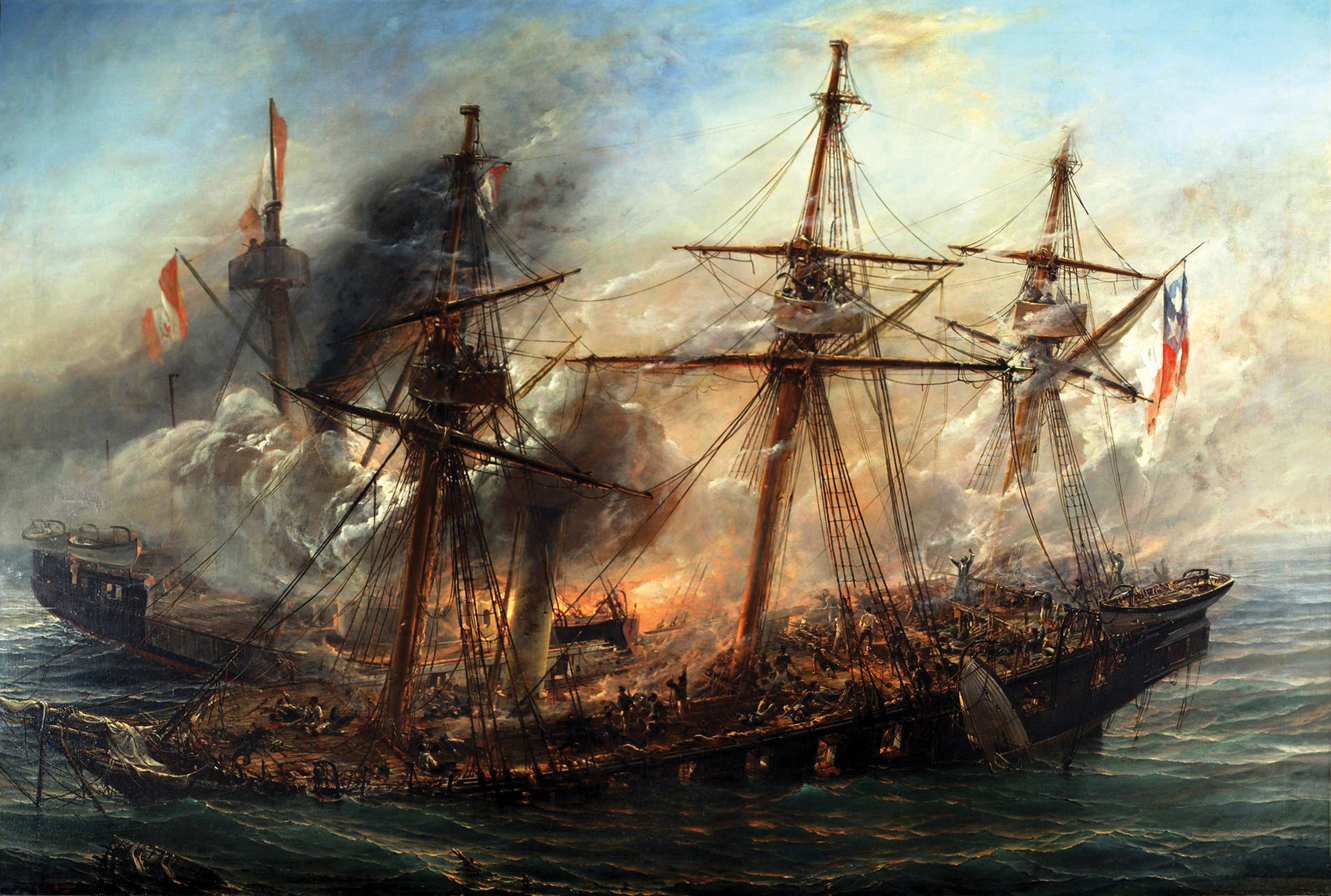
Naval combat: Sinking of the Esmeralda during the Battle of Iquique by Thomas Somerscales, depicting the Peruvian Navy ironclad Huáscar sinking the Chilean Navy corvette Esmeralda during the War of the Pacific, 1879

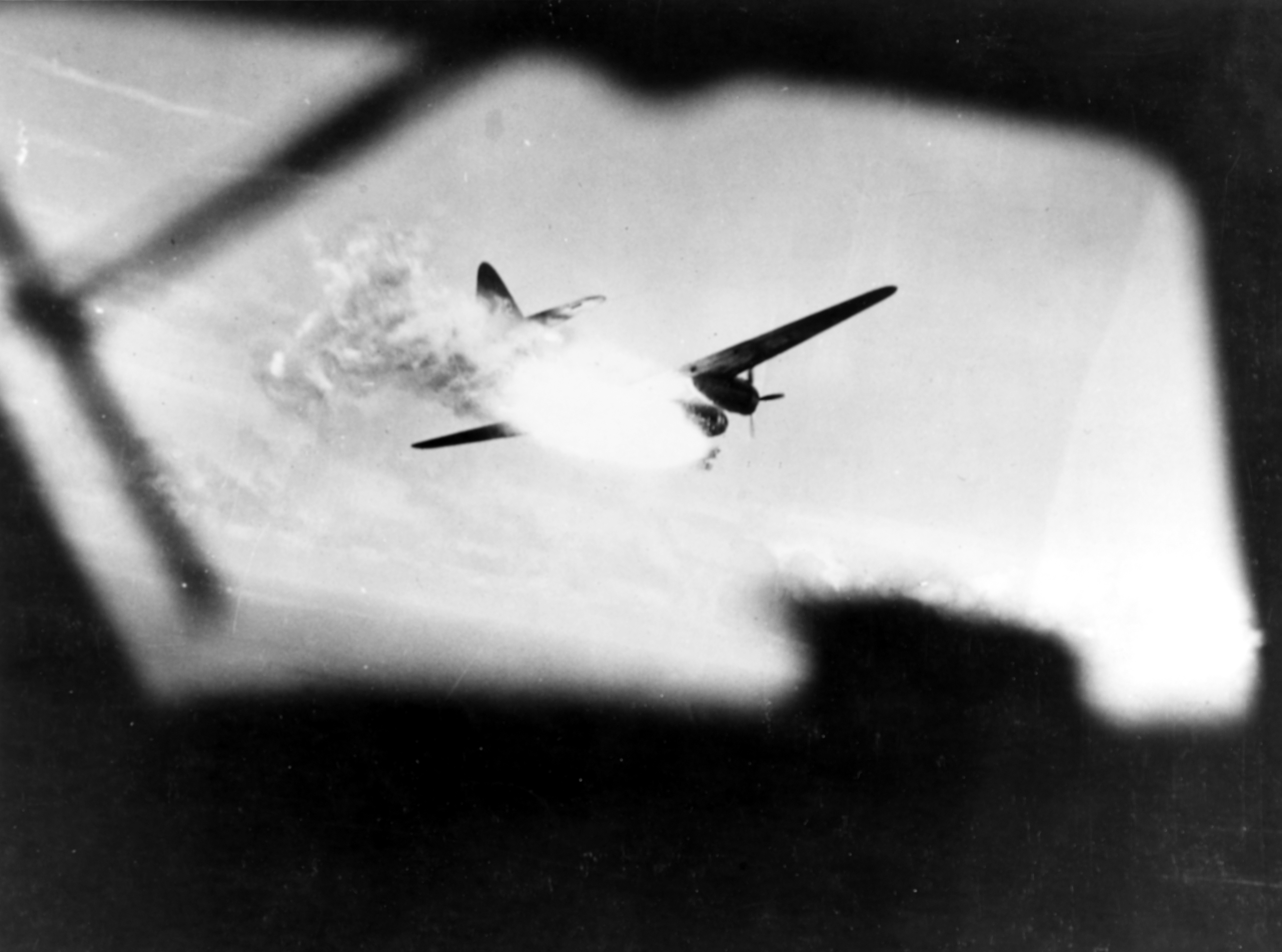
Aerial combat: An Imperial Japanese Navy Mitsubishi G4M on fire after being shot down by a United States Navy Consolidated PB2Y Coronado during World War II, 1944

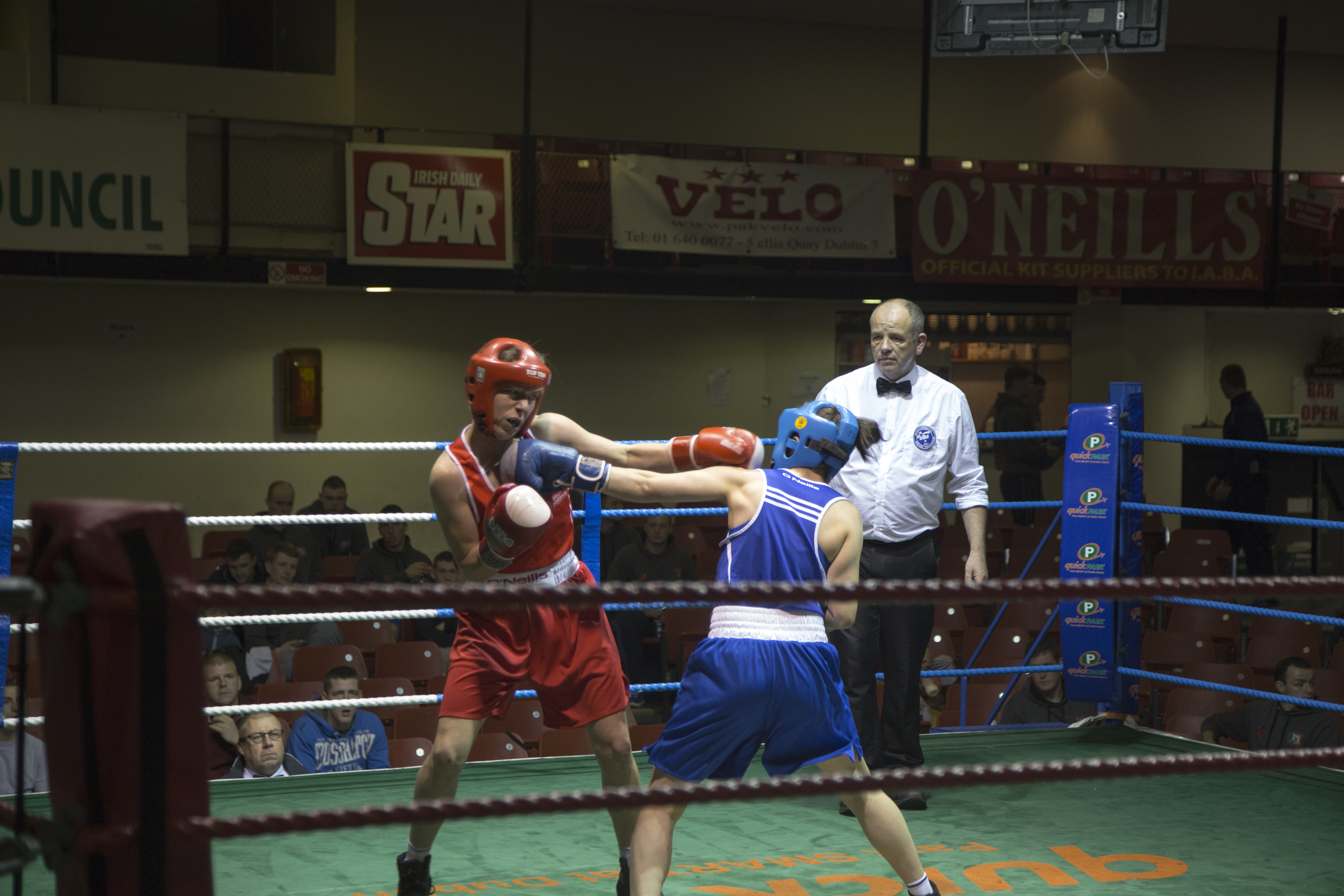
Combat sports: Two Irish Defence Forces members hitting each other during a military-sanctioned boxing championship, 2014

Combat is a purposeful violent conflict between multiple combatants with the intent to harm the opposition. Combat may be armed (using weapons) or unarmed (not using weapons). Combat is resorted to either as a method of self-defense or to impose one's will upon others. An instance of combat can be a standalone confrontation or part of a wider conflict, and its scale can range from a fight between individuals to a war between organized groups. Combat may also be benign and recreational, as in the cases of combat sports and mock combat.

Combat may comply with, or be in violation of, local or international laws regarding conflict. Examples of rules include the Geneva Conventions (covering the treatment of people in war), medieval chivalry, the Marquess of Queensberry Rules (covering boxing), and the individual rulesets of various combat sports.

== Hand-to-hand combat ==
Hand-to-hand combat (melee) is combat at very close range, attacking the opponent with the body (striking, kicking, strangling, etc.) or with a melee weapon (knives, swords, batons, etc.) as opposed to a ranged weapon.

Hand-to-hand combat can be further divided into three sections depending on the distance and positioning of the combatants:

- Clinch fighting
- Ground fighting
- Stand-up fighting

== Military combat ==
Military combat involves two or more opposing military forces meeting in warfare. Military combat situations can involve multiple groups, such as guerilla groups, insurgents and domestic or foreign governments.

A military situation may be known as a duel, action, affair, skirmish, engagement, combat, battle, campaign, or war, depending on the size of the fighting and the geographical areas in which it occurs. A combat between two armies that decides the fate of a war or a separate theater- or campaign-sized operation is a pitched battle. (Note: German: Hauptschlacht; French: bataille générale or bataille rangée; Russian: генеральное сражение) An encounter battle does not affect the outcome that can be caused by the previous case. A combat between two armies that had less definite results than a pitched battle, but led to a more or less significant change in the situation in the theater, is simply called a battle. (Note: German: Schlacht; French: bataille; Russian: сражение) Clash of independent parts of two armies, namely corps or divisions, is called a combat or engagement. (Note: German: Treffen or Gefecht; French: combat; Russian: бой) Clashes of even smaller formations are called an affair, action, skirmish, or also engagement. (Note: German: Scharmützel; French: escarmouche; Russian: дело or стычка) However, all of these terms may be used in different ways depending on the context. In naval warfare there is also a term fleet action.

Combat effectiveness has always demanded that the personnel maintain strategic preparedness by being sufficiently trained, armed, equipped, and funded to carry out combat operations in the unit to which they are assigned. Warfare falls under the law of war, which govern its purposes and conduct, and protect the rights of combatants and non-combatants.

== Sources ==
- Martin van Creveld: The Changing Face of War: Lessons of Combat, from the Marne to Turkey. Maine, New England 2007.
