= Janssen Medal (French Academy of Sciences) =

Award for advances in astrophysics

The Janssen Medal is an astrophysics award presented by the French Academy of Sciences to those who have made advances in this area of science.

The award was founded in 1886, though the first medal was not awarded until a year later. The commission formed to decide on the first recipient of the medal selected the German physicist Gustav Kirchhoff for his work on the science of spectroscopy. However, Kirchhoff died aged 63 on 17 October 1887, a few months before the award would have been announced. Rather than choosing a new recipient for the award, the commission announced at the academy's session of 26 December 1887 that the inaugural medal would be placed on his grave, in "supreme honour of the memory of this great scholar of Heidelberg".

The award had been intended to be biennial, but was awarded in 1888 and again in 1889. A statement in the 1889 volume of Comptes rendus de l'Académie des sciences clarified that the award would be presented annually for the first seven years, and then biennially from 1894 onwards.

This award is distinct from the Prix Jules Janssen (created in 1897), an annual award presented by the French Astronomical Society. Both awards are named for the French astronomer Pierre Janssen (1824–1907) (better known as Jules Janssen). Janssen founded the academy award, and was a member of the inaugural commission.

== Laureates ==
- 1887 – Gustav Kirchhoff (posthumously)
- 1888 – William Huggins
- 1889 – Norman Lockyer
- 1890 – Charles Augustus Young
- 1891 – Georges Rayet
- 1892 – Pietro Tacchini
- 1893 – Samuel Pierpont Langley
- 1894 – George Ellery Hale
- 1896 – Henri Deslandres
- 1898 – Aristarkh Belopolsky
- 1900 – Edward Emerson Barnard
- 1902 – Aymar de la Baume Pluvinel
- 1904 – Aleksey Pavlovitch Hansky
- 1905 – Gaston Millochau (silver-gilt award)
- 1906 – Annibale Ricco
- 1908 – Pierre Puiseux
- 1910 – William Wallace Campbell
- 1912 – Alfred Perot
- 1914 – René Jarry-Desloges
- 1916 – Charles Fabry
- 1918 – Stanislas Chevalier
- 1920 – William Coblentz
- 1922 – Carl Størmer
- 1924 – George Willis Ritchey
- 1926 – Francisco Miranda da Costa Lobo
- 1928 – William Hammond Wright
- 1930 – Bernard Ferdinand Lyot
- 1932 – Alexandre Dauvillier
- 1934 – Walter Sydney Adams
- 1936 – Henry Norris Russell
- 1938 – Bertil Lindblad
- 1940 – Harlow Shapley
- 1943 – Lucien Henri d'Azambuja
- 1944 – Jean Rösch
- 1946 – Jan Hendrik Oort
- 1949 – Daniel Chalonge
- 1952 – André Couder
- 1955 – Otto Struve
- 1958 – André Lallemand
- 1961 – Pol Swings
- 1964 – Jean-François Denisse
- 1967 – Bengt Strömgren
- 1970 – Gérard Wlérick
- 1973 – Lucienne Devan (silver-gilt award)
- 1976 – Paul Ledoux
- 1979 – Jean Delhaye
- 1982 – Georges Michaud
- 1985 – Pierre Lacroute
- 1988 – Lodewijk Woltjer.
- 1990 – Pierre Charvin
- 1992 – Henk C. Van de Hulst
- 1994 – Serge Koutchmy
- 1999 – Jean-Marie Mariotti
- 2003 – Gilbert Vedrenne
- 2007 – Bernard Fort
- 2011 – Francois Mignard
- 2019 – Eric Hosy

The list above is complete up to 2019.

== See also ==
- List of astronomy awards
