= Lucien Rudaux =

French painter

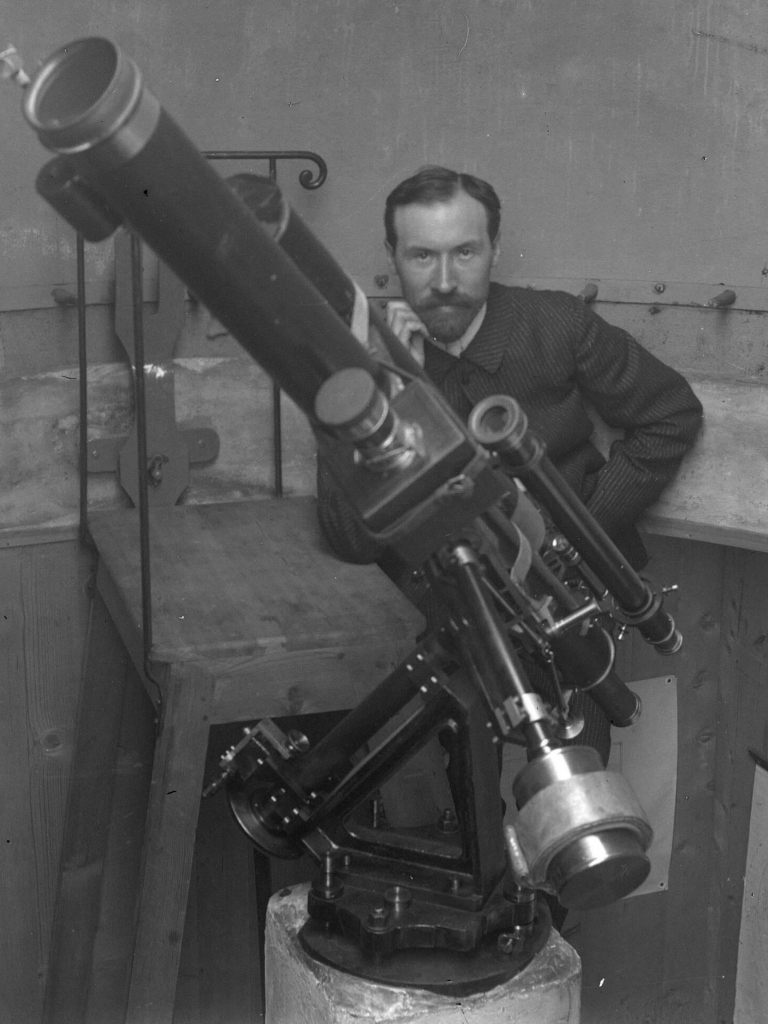
Rudaux in 1913

Lucien Rudaux (French: [lysjɛ̃ ʁydo]; 1874–1947) was a French artist and astronomer, who created famous paintings of space themes in the 1920s and 1930s.

The crater Rudaux on Mars and the Lucien Rudaux Memorial Award are named in his honor. The asteroid 3574 Rudaux is also named for him.

== Biography ==
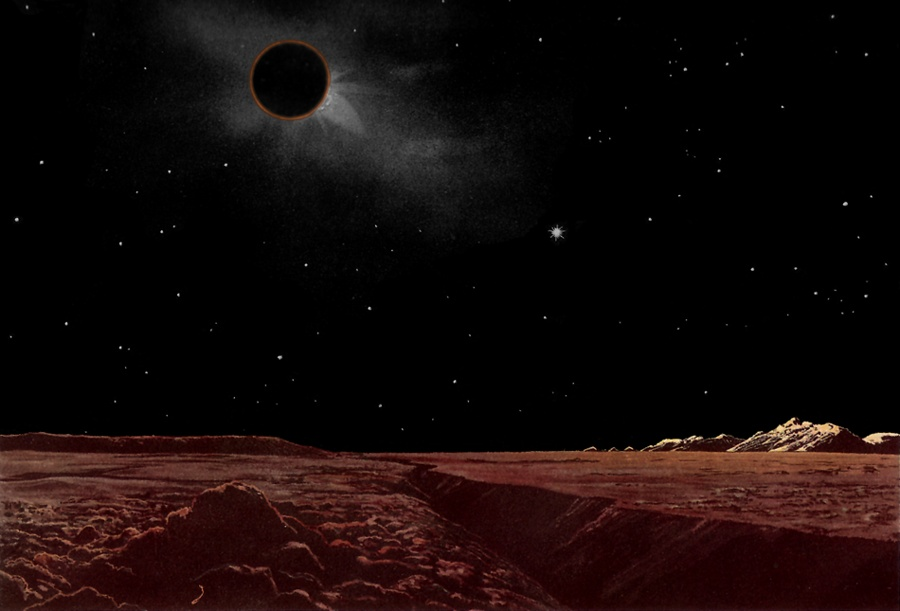
Painting by Lucien Rudaux, showing what a lunar eclipse might look like from the surface of the Moon. The Moon's surface appears red because the only sunlight visible has refracted through the Earth's atmosphere on the edges of the Earth in the sky.

Lucien Rudaux was the son of the painter Edmond Rudaux, and grandfather by marriage of the French physicist Francis Rocard.

In 1892, he joined the Société astronomique de France. In 1894, he founded an observatory in Donville. In 1895–1896, he completed his military service at Granville.

From 1903, he was a science writer and artist for Nature and, from 1905, for L'Illustration.

He was in military service from August 1914 in the 79th Territorial Infantry Regiment. In 1915 he joined the 10th nursing section until 1917.

In 1936, he lived in 113 Boulevard Saint-Michel in Paris.

In 1912 he was appointed an Officer of Public Instruction. He was a member of the Astronomical Society of France and the National Meteorological Office. In 1936, he was made a Knight (Chevalier) of the Legion of Honour.

== Astronomical activities ==
He was the director of a small observatory, Donville-les-Bains in Normandy, and contributed to the establishment of the "Astronomy" in the "Palais de la découverte".

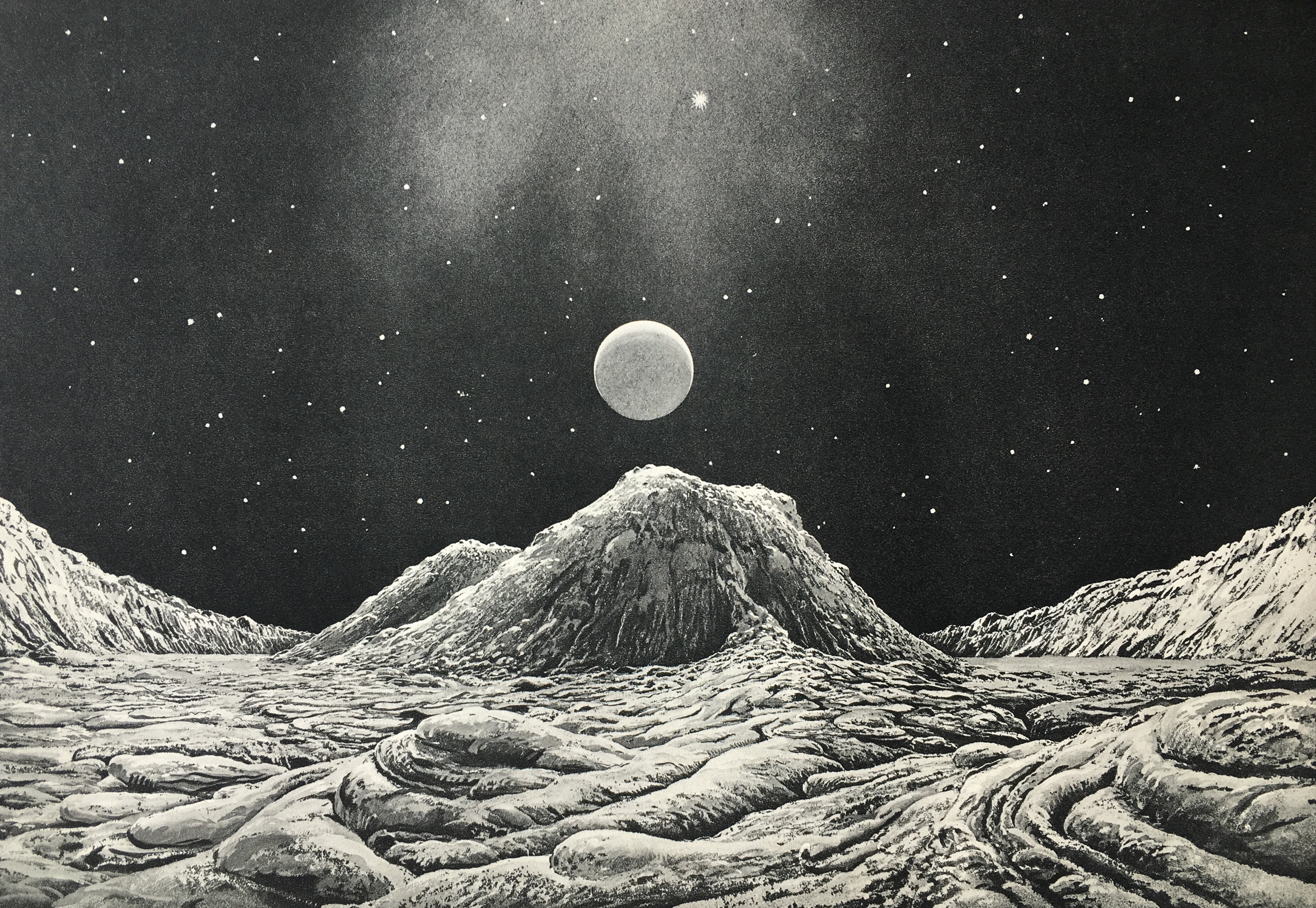
In other worlds

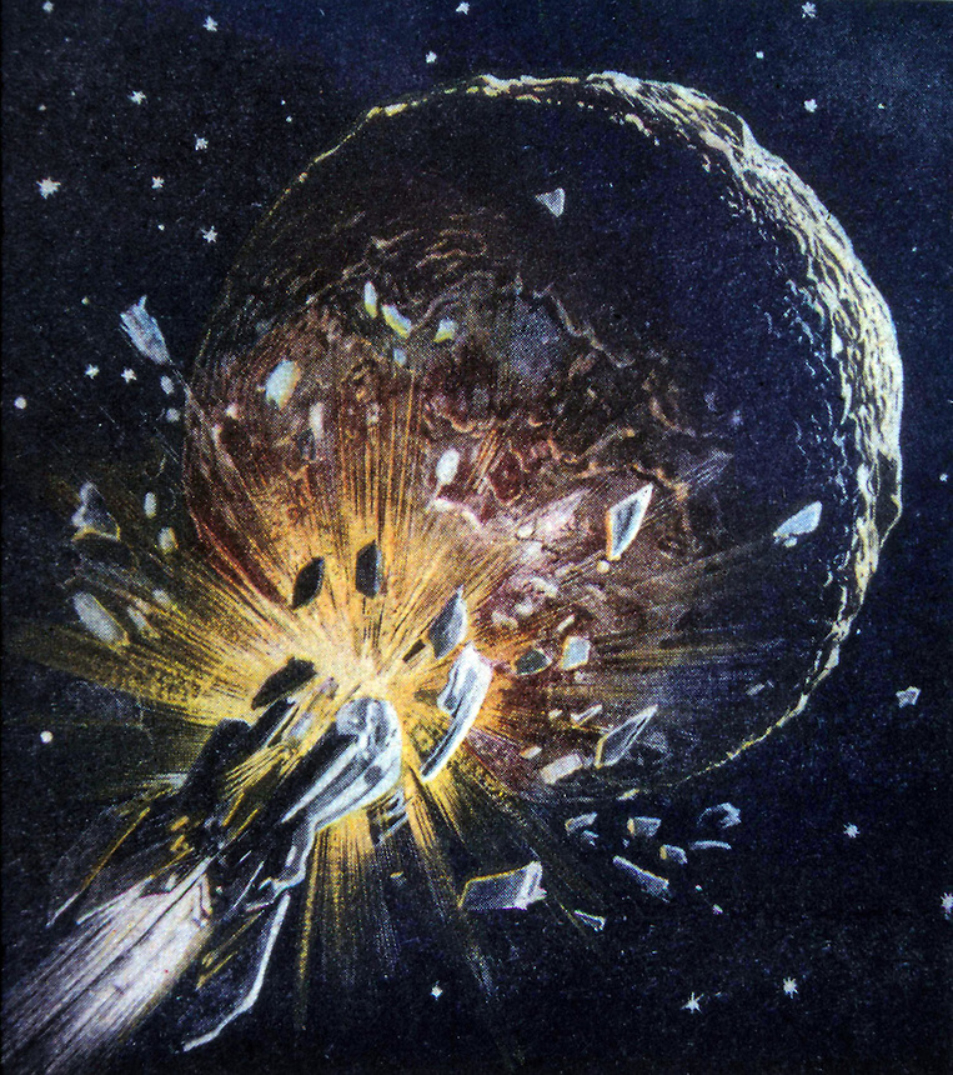
Dangers of space

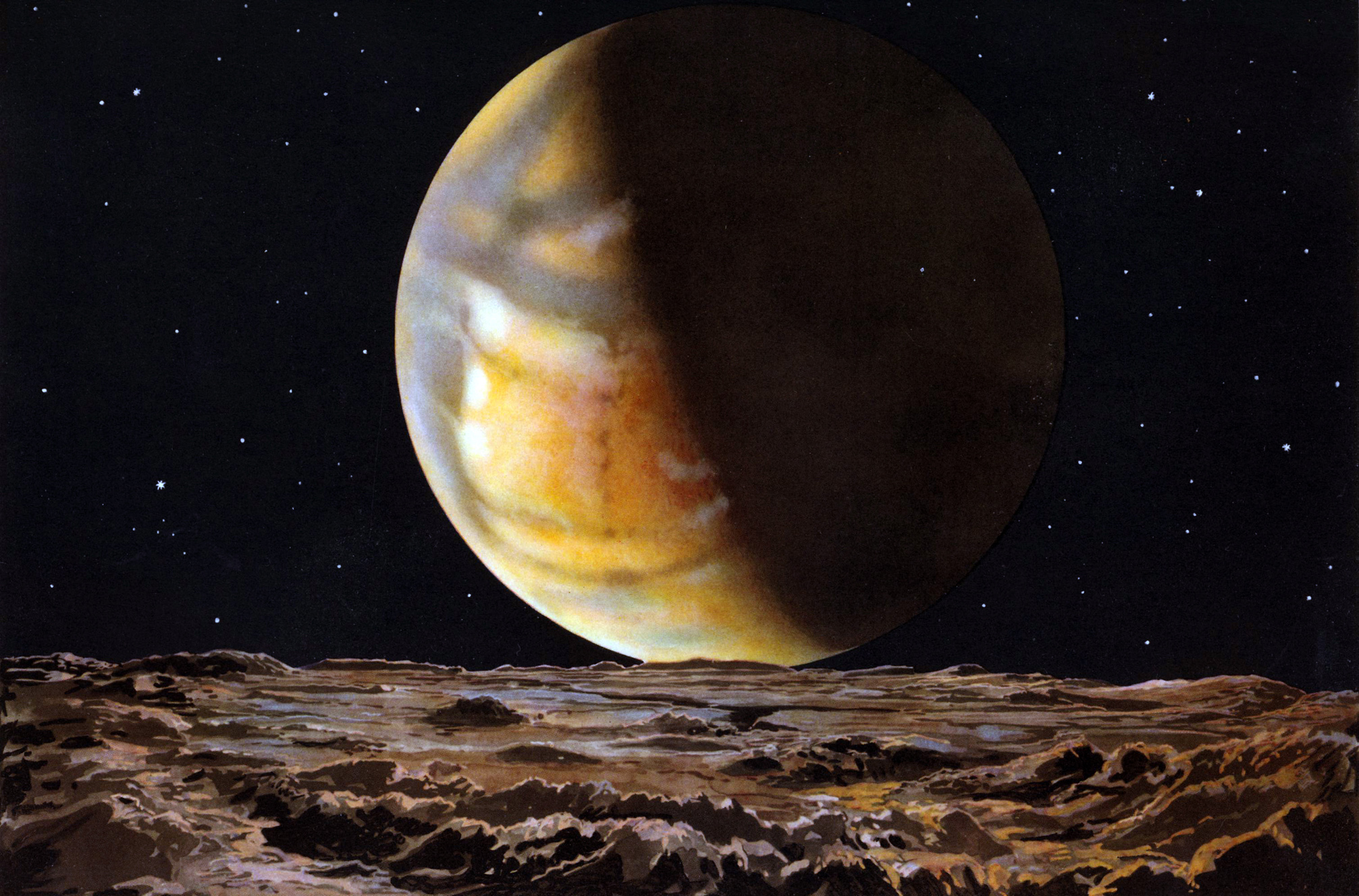
Mars

== Books ==
L. Rudaux, G. Vaucouleurs; Astronomy (

== Publications in French ==
- Librairie Garnier Frères, ed. (1915). Ce qu'on voit dans le ciel - notions pratiques d'astronomie (in French). Paris.
- Alphonse Berget (1923). Librairie Larousse (ed.). Le Ciel (in French). Paris., illustrated by Lucien Rudaux.
- Larousse, ed. (1925). Manuel Pratique d'Astronomie (in French). Paris. (later editions 1952, with collaborator Gérard de Vaucouleurs)
- Larousse, ed. (1937). Sur Les Autres Mondes (in French). Paris. (later edition. 1990)
- Nouvelles Éditions Latines, ed. (1947). La Lune et son histoire (in French). Paris.
- Lucien Rudaux; Gérard de Vaucouleurs (1948). Librairie Larousse (ed.). Astronomie, les astres, l'univers (in French). Paris. (later editions. 1952, 1956)

== Notes and references ==
- http://iaaa.org/gallery/rudaux/
- http://www.fabiofeminofantascience.org/PAUL/PAUL2.html
