= Pierre Antonini =

French mathematics professor and amateur astronomer

Minor planets discovered: 35
see § List of discovered minor planets

Supernovae discovered: 2
SN 2000B	11 January 2000	Src
SN 2001dd	14 July 2001	Src

Pierre Antonini is a retired French mathematics professor and amateur astronomer who has discovered several minor planets and two supernovae at his private Observatoire de Bédoin (Bedoin Observatory; observatory code: 132) located at Bédoin, southeastern France. For many of his discoveries he used a 16-cm telescope or a 30-cm telescope.

He is a prolific discoverer of asteroids. The Minor Planet Center (MPC) credits him with the discovery of 35 numbered minor planets between 1997 and 1999. As of March 2016, the MPC ranks him 204th in the all-time, top-astronomer chart by number of discovered bodies. Antonini is also credited with the discovery of the supernovae SN 2000B and SN 2001dd. In January 2004, he co-discovered a minor-planet moon orbiting the main-belt asteroid 1089 Tama.

The 7-kilometer sized main-belt asteroid 12580 Antonini, discovered by Laurent Bernasconi in 1999, was named in his honour.

== List of discovered minor planets ==
10925 Ventoux	28 January 1998	list
11147 Delmas	6 December 1997	list
11675 Billboyle	15 February 1998	list
13411 OLRAP	31 October 1999	list
14533 Roy	24 August 1997	list
15899 Silvain	3 September 1997	list
16892 Vaissière	17 February 1998	list
20242 Sagot	27 February 1998	list
(23784) 1998 QW_{15}	22 August 1998	list
(24170) 1999 WB_{13}	29 November 1999	list
(26206) 1997 PJ_{4}	11 August 1997	list
(26961) 1997 OY_{1}	29 July 1997	list

(26979) 1997 UR_{9}	29 October 1997	list
(28021) 1998 BP_{6}	22 January 1998	list
(29677) 1998 XL_{17}	15 December 1998	list
(31223) 1998 BJ_{30}	28 January 1998	list
(31255) 1998 DL_{27}	27 February 1998	list
(33094) 1997 YG_{5}	23 December 1997	list
(35675) 1998 XK_{17}	15 December 1998	list
(37838) 1998 DF	17 February 1998	list
(39868) 1998 DM_{27}	27 February 1998	list
(40765) 1999 TF_{16}	10 October 1999	list
(41207) 1999 WK_{9}	29 November 1999	list
(46772) 1998 HD_{8}	21 April 1998	list

(52585) 1997 ON_{2}	29 July 1997	list
(58669) 1997 YF_{5}	20 December 1997	list
(65892) 1998 BH_{30}	28 January 1998	list
(66849) 1999 VM_{8}	4 November 1999	list
(74378) 1998 XH_{11}	8 December 1998	list
(79426) 1997 QZ	24 August 1997	list
(90983) 1997 XU_{5}	6 December 1997	list
(96343) 1997 RS_{1}	3 September 1997	list
(100546) 1997 EU_{32}	13 March 1997	list
(100977) 1998 QJ_{26}	25 August 1998	list
(155437) 1998 DE	17 February 1998	list
none was co-discovered

== See also ==
- International Astronomical Union Circular
- List of French astronomers
- List of minor planet discoverers
