= Charles Nordmann =

French astronomer (1881–1940)

Charles Nordmann (18 May 1881 – 28 August 1940) was a French astronomer.

Worked at the Paris Observatory and on artillery sound ranging during World War I.

== Publications ==
- Einstein et l'univers: Une lueur dans le mystère des choses (1921)
