= Noël Duret =

Noël Duret or Natalis Durret (1590 in Montbrison, Loire – 1650 in Paris), was a French mathematician and astronomer, cosmographer for King Louis XIII and Cardinal Richelieu. He was one of the publishers of François Viète.
