= Samuel Kansi =

French astronomer

Samuel Kansi was a French astronomer of the 14th century. The surname "Kansi" is an incorrectly formed adjective of the Hebrew noun "keneset", and is the equivalent of "D'Escola", a name borne by several Provençal Jews. Kansi wrote the introduction to the astronomical work Shesh Kenafayim of Immanuel ben Jacob of Tarascon. He is supposed to be identical with Samuel Nasi d'Escola, whose commentary on the astronomical tables of Jacob ben David ben Yom-Tov Bonet (Bonjorn) is still extant. A certain Samuel d'Escola, perhaps identical with Kansi, copied, in 1406, at Avignon, the Mishneh Torah of Maimonides.
