= Gaston Millochau =

French astronomer (1866–1922)

Gaston Millochau (12 October 1866 – 18 November 1922) was a French astronomer from Toulouse.

From 1899 until 1903 he observed Mars at the Meudon Observatory and reported some details visible on its surface. In contrast to other observers at that time he did not see any canal-like features.

A crater on Mars was named in his honor. Awarded the Janssen Medal from the French Academy of Sciences in 1905.
