= Deslandres table =

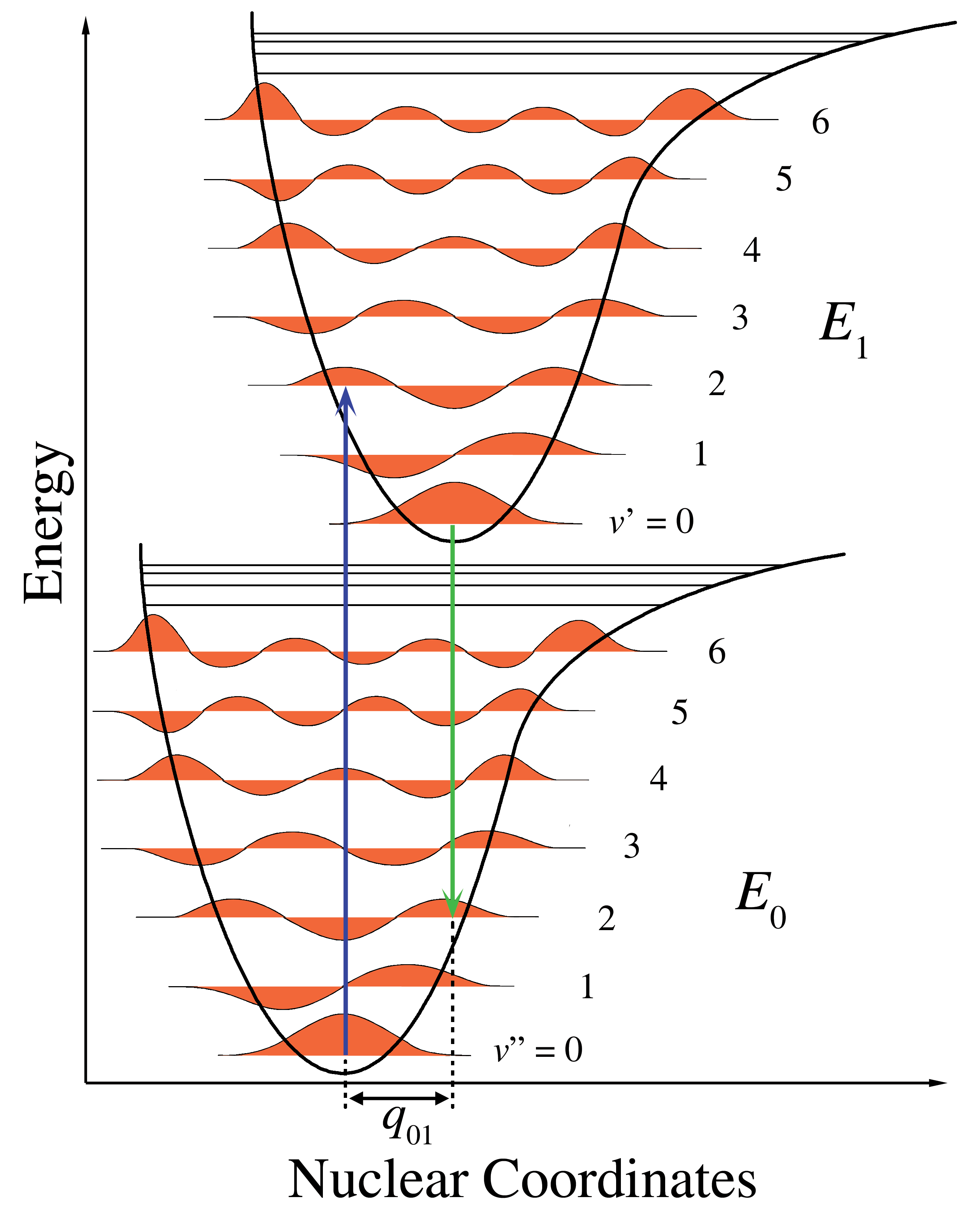
Vibronic transitions between different vibrational energy levels of two electronic states of a molecule

In electronic spectroscopy, constructing a Deslandres table is a useful method to assign vibronic transitions. In such a table, the frequencies of the lines seen in an electronic spectrum of a molecule are collected so that the differences in energy between adjacent columns or rows are all the same (within experimental error). Every line seen in the spectrum corresponds to a transition from the lower-lying electronic energy state to an excited electronic state (molecular electronic transition): associated with this, there are corresponding transitions between the vibrational levels of the two states, that give rise to many closely spaced lines. The intensity of the lines is governed by the Franck–Condon principle.

When a Deslandres table is filled correctly, the columns represent the vibrational energy levels of the lower electronic state (v''), while the rows represent those for the upper electronic state (v'). Clearly, the difference in energy between two successive rows (columns) must remain constant for any column (row) in the table because this represents the energy difference of two given vibrational levels within the same electronic state. Thus, by completing a Deslandres table it is easy to assign the correct vibrational quantum numbers v'' and v' for the transition, allowing important molecular properties to be calculated, such as the dissociation energy.
