= Flash spotting =

Method of detecting enemy positions

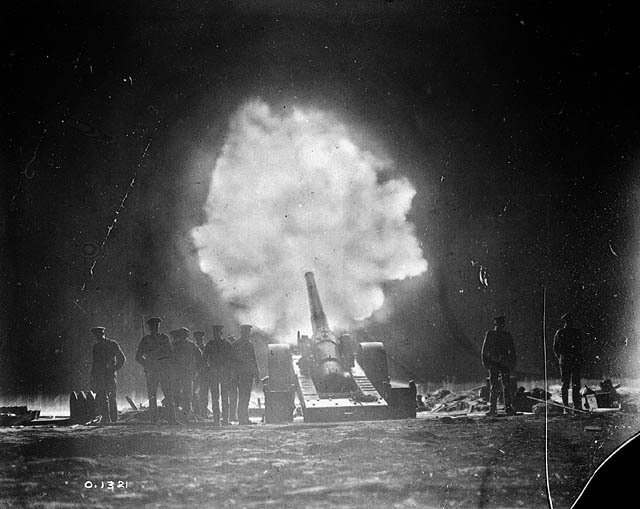
The bright flash of artillery firing could be seen from long distances

Flash spotting was a military method of detecting the position of enemy artillery guns at long range where the gun could not be observed directly, and was developed during World War I. The flashes could be observed at night as reflections from the sky. The purpose was then to call up friendly guns to destroy the enemy guns' position. Theoretically this could be achieved by several observers spotting the flash from a particular gun and then plotting the intersection of the bearings.

This was extremely difficult with multiple guns firing since several observers could not be sure they were all looking at the same gun. The British solved this using a "flashboard" located at HQ fitted with a combination of buzzers and signal lights connected to the observers by telephone wires. Using this system, after a sequence of observations, all observers could be sure they were looking at the same gun flashing and its position determined by triangulation.

== See also ==
- Counter-battery fire
- Artillery sound ranging
