= Sébastien Charnoz =

French astronomer

Pr. Sébastien Charnoz (born 1974) is a planetary scientist who studies planetary dynamics at the Université Paris Cité and Institut de Physique du Globe de Paris. He also works for the CEA (Center for Atomic Energy) in France.

His work covers problems relating to collisional dynamics such as the physics of planetary rings and the formation of the Solar System. He specializes in numerical simulations. Along with André Brahic (Professor at Université Paris 7) he is involved in the imaging team of the Cassini mission, led by Carolyn Porco. Using numerical code he wrote for automatic satellite detection (among hundreds of images provided by the ISS camera system), he helped the Imaging Team discover the two smallest known moons of the Saturn system in 2004^{,}^{,}^{,}: Methone and Pallene.
