= René Jarry-Desloges =

French astronomer (1868–1951)

René Jarry-Desloges (February 1, 1868 – June 1, 1951) was a French amateur astronomer who worked at his own observatory.

He observed the planets, and claimed to have confirmed Giovanni Schiaparelli's value of the rotational period of Mercury. However, radar observations made in 1965 showed that they were both wrong.

The French Academy of Sciences awarded him the Janssen Medal for 1914. There is an impact crater on Mars named in his honor. In 1921, he received the Prix Jules Janssen, the highest award of the Société astronomique de France, the French astronomical society.
