= Henri-Alexandre Deslandres =

French astronomer (1853–1948)

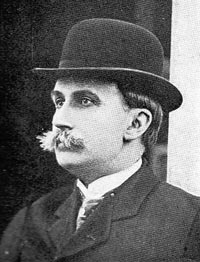
- Henri-Alexandre Deslandres
- Born: 24 July 1853; Paris, France
- Died: 15 January 1948 (aged 94); Paris, France
- Education: École Polytechnique
- Known for: spectroheliograph
- Awards: Janssen Medal (1896); Gold Medal of the Royal Astronomical Society (1913); Henry Draper Medal (1913); Fellow of the Royal Society
- Scientific career
- Fields: astronomy
- Workplaces: Meudon; Paris Observatories

Henri Alexandre Deslandres (French pronunciation: [ɑ̃ʁi alɛksɑ̃dʁ delɑ̃dʁ]; 24 July 1853 – 15 January 1948) was a French astronomer, director of the Meudon and Paris Observatories, who carried out intensive studies on the behaviour of the atmosphere of the Sun.

== Biography ==
Deslandres's undergraduate years at the École Polytechnique were played out against the aftermath of the Franco-Prussian War and the chaos of the Paris Commune so, on graduation in 1874, he responded to the continuing military tension with the emerging Germany by embarking on a military career. Rising to the rank of captain in the engineers, he became increasingly interested in physics and, in 1881, resigned his commission to join Alfred Cornu's laboratory at the École Polytechnique, working on spectroscopy. He continued his spectroscopic work at the Sorbonne, earning his doctorate in 1888 and created the deslandres table, which finds numerical patterns in spectral lines that paralleled the work of Johann Balmer and were to catalyse the development of quantum mechanics in the 20th century.

In 1868, Pierre Janssen's solar observations had led him to report to the Académie des Sciences that It is no longer geometry and mechanics which dominate [in astronomy] but physics and chemistry. Such advice was sternly rejected by director of the Paris Observatory Urbain Le Verrier and the French government awarded Janssen a grant to establish an astrophysical observatory at Meudon on the outskirts of Paris with Janssen as the sole astronomer. In 1889, Le Verrier was succeeded by Amédée Mouchez who set to work to bring astrophysics into the mainstream by hiring Deslandres. Deslandres developed the spectroheliograph simultaneously with George Hale.

In 1898, he joined Janssen at Meudon, increasing the scientific staff by 100%. On Janssen's death in 1907, Deslandres became director and embarked on a programme of expansion. Deslandres was the President of the Société Astronomique de France (SAF), the French astronomical society, from 1907-1909. At the outbreak of World War I in 1914, though already in his 60s, he returned to active service in the engineers as a major and later lieutenant colonel. In 1918, following the armistice, he resumed his office at Meudon until 1926 when its administration merged with that of the Paris Observatory, Mouchez assuming the role of director of both institutions until his retirement in 1929.

He remained active in research right up until his death. Fellow astronomer Raymond Michard observed that In his bearing, his character and his style of life Deslandres always remained more akin to the soldier (and the officer) than to the scholar.

Deslandres at the Fourth Conference International Union for Cooperation in Solar Research at Mount Wilson Observatory, 1910

== Honours ==
Awards

- Gold Medal of the Royal Astronomical Society, (1913)
- Henry Draper Medal of the National Academy of Sciences, (1913)
- Prix Jules Janssen, the highest award of the Société astronomique de France, the French astronomical society, (1920)
- Bruce Medal of the Astronomical Society of the Pacific, (1921)
- Fellow of the Royal Society

Named after him

- The crater Deslandres on the Moon
- Deslandres Prize of the French Academy of Sciences
- Asteroid 11763 Deslandres
