= Jean-Marc Bonnet-Bidaud =

French astrophysicist (born 1950)

- Born: 1950 (age 75–76)
- Scientific career
- Fields: High-energy astrophysics, highly condensed stars in the galaxy
- Workplaces: Atomic Energy and Alternative Energies Commission (CEA)
- Website: bonnetbidaud.free.fr

Jean-Marc Bonnet-Bidaud (born 1950) is a French astrophysicist at the Atomic Energy and Alternative Energies Commission (CEA). He is a specialist in high-energy astrophysics and in the study of highly condensed stars in the galaxy (white dwarfs, neutron stars and black holes). He is also active in the field of the history of astronomy and in charge of the public outreach for astronomy at CEA.

== Scientific work ==
Among his highest citation scientific papers are the discovery and collaborative study of an atypical supernova observed in 2006, a scientific review on the enigmatic X-ray source Cygnus X-3 and its reported very high energy emission and the discovery of abnormal CNO abundances among accreting magnetic white dwarfs.

From 2009, Jean-Marc Bonnet-Bidaud is involved in the StarAcc project (initially POLAR project) which aims to reproduce in the laboratory physical conditions similar to those existing on the surface of magnetic white dwarfs thanks to the use of lasers of power. The POLAR project reached an essential milestone in 2016 by demonstrating for the first time the possibility of reproducing in the laboratory an accretion structure (accretion shock and radiative zone) in agreement with numerical predictions and astrophysical observations

This result opens the way to the use of very energetic lasers, such as the NIF (National Ignition Facility-USA) or the LMJ (Laser Megajoule-France), to achieve radiative regimes strictly homothetic to the astrophysical situation. Ultimately, these experiments should make it possible to reliably produce miniature models in the laboratory that are almost analogous to real astrophysical conditions.

== History of science ==
=== History of cosmology ===
Between 1993 and 2005, Jean-Marc Bonnet-Bidaud conducted a series of interviews for the magazine Ciel et Espace with physicists and astrophysicists who were key figures in modern cosmology—specifically, individuals who made significant contributions to both the development and the critique of the Big Bang model. The purpose of these interviews was to capture the personal accounts and perspectives—at times critical—of these prominent scientists regarding the current cosmological model. Among those interviewed were the English astrophysicist Fred Hoyle, one of the architects of the "steady-state" model of the universe (a competitor to the Big Bang theory); the American Geoffrey Burbidge and the Indian scientist Jayant Narlikar both of whom were openly critical of the Big Bang model; the German-born physicist Hans Bethe, who served as scientific director at the Los Alamos National Laboratory—the site where the U.S. atomic bomb was developed; the American Allan Sandage, who succeeded Edwin Hubble in measuring the expansion of the universe; the Frenchman Gérard de Vaucouleurs a central figure in a long-standing controversy concerning the measurement of the Hubble constant; and the Frenchman Jean-Claude Pecker, considered one of the "founding fathers" of French astrophysics.

With the philosopher of science Thomas Lepeltier, Jean-Marc Bonnet-Bidaud co-directed the publication in 2012 of the collective work Un autre cosmos ?. The central idea of the book is to encourage researchers to look into alternative cosmological models to that of the Big Bang.

In 2021, Jean-Marc Bonnet-Bidaud and Thomas Lepeltier published the work Big Bang - Histoire critique d'une idée, in which the evolution of the idea of an expanding universe evolving at from a hot phase, at the basis of the current cosmology of the Big Bang is discussed. The authors show how this basic hypothesis evolved in several stages to arrive at the current model known as LCDM (Lamba-Cold-Dark-Matter) in which 95% of the content of the universe remains unknown. A critical analysis is provided of the assumptions underlying this model, highlighting the current difficulties.

=== Accounts of the Creation of the World ===
In 2025, Jean-Marc Bonnet-Bidaud published the book Les Rêves de l'origine : Récits extraordinaires de la création du Monde, illustrated by Guillaume Duprat. The work presents a selection of ancient cosmogonies based on authentic texts that were preserved in the different parts of the world, including China, the Dogon people, ancient Egypt, Greece, Persia, India, the Maya civilization, and Europe (Genesis). The originality of this work lies in its parallel presentation of our current cosmological model—the Big Bang— demonstrating how this modern description maintains close links to ancient accounts.

=== Chinese astronomy ===
Bonnet-Bidaud is the author of the first scientific study of the oldest known stellar map, the Dunhuang Star Chart, also known as the S.3326 manuscript, a document found in China along the Silk road and now kept at the British Library in London, England. The study concludes to a now revised datation at +650-685, making the chart contemporary of the early Tang dynasty and most probably produced by the famous Chinese astronomer Li Chunfeng.

He has produced in 2017 the book 4000 ans d'astronomie chinoise, that gives an overview of the astronomical discoveries made in China over centuries. The book has been translated in Chinese in 2020 : 书名:4000年中国天文史.

== Bibliography ==
=== Books ===
- Les sciences de l'Empire du Milieu, Edition Belin, 2023 ISBN 9782410025118
- Big Bang - Histoire critique d'une idée, Jean-Marc Bonnet-Bidaud et Thomas Lepeltier, Edition Gallimard-Folio, 2021 ISBN 9782072586491
- 书名:4000年中国天文史, Edition CITIC (2020) (ISBN 978-7521713527)
- 4000 ans d'astronomie chinoise, Edition Belin (2017) (ISBN 978-2-7011-3652-3)
- Variations sur un même ciel (2012) with Aurélien Barrau and Michel Cassé ISBN 978-2-36012-031-4
- Le Soleil dans la peau (2012) with Alain Froment, Patrick Moureaux and Aymeric Petit ISBN 2-221-13056-1
- Un autre cosmos ? (2012) ISBN 2311007742
- Le big bang n'est pas une théorie comme les autres (2009) with François-Xavier Désert, Dominique Leglu and Gilbert Reinisch ISBN 978-2360120024
- Etoiles dans la nuit des temps (2009) ISBN 978-2-296-07034-9
- Daniel Pontoreau (2002) with Ann Hindry and Luc Lang ISBN 978-2-7427-3591-4
- L'Etat des Sciences (1991) ISBN 9782707120694

=== Films ===
- The Dunhuang star chart (2009) with Jérôme Blumberg, CNRS Images
- Enigmes de Sirius (2008) with Jérôme Blumberg, CNRS Images
- Sirius, the Dogon star (1999) with Jérôme Blumberg, CNRS Images media-FEMIS-CICT
