= Odette Jasse =

French astronomer

- Born: 21 August 1899; Saint-Victoret, France
- Died: 9 January 1949 (aged 49); Marseille, France
- Occupations: Astronomer, Administrator

Odette Jasse (21 August 1899 – 9 January 1949) was a French astronomer who led a scientific and administrative career at the Marseille Observatory.

== Biography ==
Jasse was born in Saint-Victoret, France. Her parents were a teacher and a customs inspector, but her father died in 1928 and her mother followed only a few years later.

Jasse attended a school for girls in Marseille before graduating with a degree in mathematics and physics, and in August 1920 she began working as an intern at the Marseille Observatory on the advice of the Observatory's director Henry Bourget.

In 1923 she began working as an assistant astronomer even though she was not officially appointed to that position until 1927. Described as "brilliant", she earned a master's degree in physics, and conducted spectroscopy research in the laboratory of director Henri Buisson, who wrote her obituary.

In that capacity, Jasse observed dwarf planets and the travel paths of the star Aldebaran and the Moon and photographed comets. However, Jasse never completed her doctoral thesis, due, in part, by her devotion to her duties at the Observatory. Beginning in 1934, she took on the "heavy tasks" as administrator of the observatory, which "may have led to her premature end."

For 24 years she also worked almost alone as the editorial secretary of the Journal des Observateurs, an international publication founded in Marseilles in 1915 to "take the place" of a similar astronomical journal published in Germany, Astronomische Nachrichten. (In 1968, several European astronomical journals, including Journal des Observateurs, merged to form Astronomy & Astrophysics.)

Jasse died in 1949 in Marseille, where a street is named in her honour.
