= Artillery sound ranging =

Determining gun location from its sounds

In land warfare, artillery sound ranging is a method of determining the coordinates of a hostile battery using data derived from the sound of its guns (or mortar or rockets) firing, so called target acquisition. The same methods can also be used to direct artillery fire at a position with known coordinates, so called fire control.

Sound ranging is an application of sound (or acoustic) location, which is the identification of the source of sounds that may originate in the air, on the ground or on or below the water's surface. Sound ranging was one of three methods of locating hostile artillery that rapidly developed in World War I. The others were aerial reconnaissance (visual and photographic) and flash spotting.

A sound ranger used aural and stop-watch methods which first emerged before World War I. Stop-watch methods involved spotting a gun firing, measuring the bearing to it and the length of time it took the sound to arrive. Aural methods typically involved a person listening to a pair of microphones a few kilometres apart and measuring the time between the sound arriving at the microphones. This method appears to have been used by the Germans throughout that war, but was quickly discarded as ineffective by the western allies, who developed scientific methods of sound ranging whose descendants are still used.

The basis of scientific sound ranging is to use a sensor post, consisting of at least a pair of microphones, to produce a bearing to the source of the sound. When using a number of sensor posts, the intersection of these bearings gives the location of the battery. The bearings are derived from the differences in the time of arrival at the microphones located in each of these sensor posts.

Typically, the sensor posts have three microphones placed in a triangular shape, typical size around 10 meters, a distance needed to obtain optimal signal to noise ratio in the lower frequency range.

Since 2018, a new approach is being developed, using so called Acoustic Multi Mission Sensors, that contain both microphones and particle velocity sensors.

As the particle velocity sensors have broad banded directionality, also for lower frequencies, the large (ground based) sensor post can be shrunk to the size of a "molehill".

== Background ==
=== Basic equipment setup ===
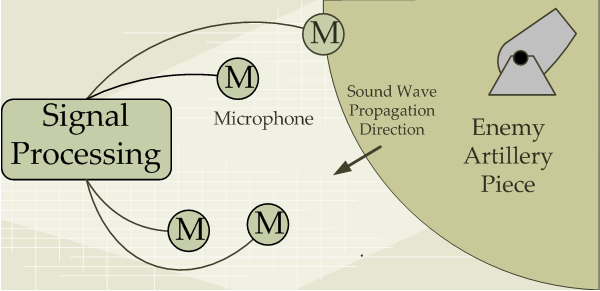
A sound ranging operation

A scientific method of sound ranging system requires the following equipment.

- An array of 4 to 6 microphones extending several kilometres
- A system capable of measuring the sound wave arrival time differences between the microphones.
- A means of analyzing the time differences to compute the position of the sound source.

The basic method is to use microphones in pairs and measure the difference in the time of arrival of a sound wave at each microphone in the pair (inner microphones are members of two pairs). From this a bearing to the origin of the sound can be found from the point midway between the two microphones. The intersection of at least three bearings will be the location of the sound source.

These constraints would be imposed to simplify the calculation of the artillery position and are not a characteristic of the general approach.

The microphones also may be designed to pick up only the sound of the gun firing. There are three types of sounds that can be picked up by the microphone.

- the gun firing (the desired signal)
- the sound of the shell moving through the air
- the impact of the shell

During World War I it was discovered that the gun firing makes a low rumbling sound that is best picked up with a microphone that is sensitive to low frequencies and rejects high frequencies.

=== Example ===
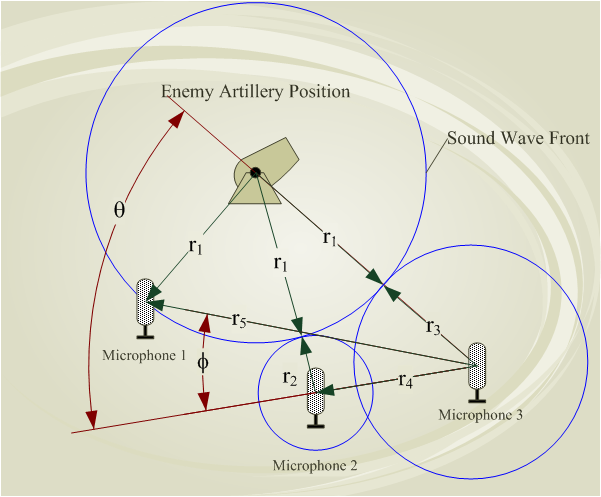
Example calculations in a sound ranging operation

Assume that we position three microphones with the following relative positions (all measurements made relative to Microphone 3).

- Distance from Microphone 1 to Microphone 3: $r_5 = 1267.9$ meters
- Distance from Microphone 2 to Microphone 3: $r_4 = 499.1$ meters
- Angle between Microphone 1 and Microphone 2 measured from Microphone 3: 16.177^{o}

These values would be established during an initial survey of the microphone layout.

Assume that two time delays are measured (assume speed of sound $\approx$330 meters per second).

- Microphone 1 to Microphone 2 time delay: 0.455 s $\Rightarrow$ $r_2 = 150$ meters
- Microphone 1 to Microphone 3 time delay: 0.606 s $\Rightarrow$ $r_3 = 200$ meters

There are a number of ways to determine the range to the artillery piece. One way is to apply the law of cosines twice.

$\left(r_1+r_2\right)^2=\left(r_1+r_3\right)^2 + r_4^2-2\cdot\left(r_1+r_3\right)\cdot r_4 \cos\theta$ ($\triangle$Microphone 3, Microphone 2, Gun)

$r_1^2=\left(r_1+r_3\right)^2 + r_5^2-2\cdot\left(r_1+r_3\right)\cdot r_5 \cos(\theta-\phi)$ ($\triangle$Microphone 1, Microphone 3, Gun)

This is a system of two equations with two unknowns ($\theta$, $r_1$). This system of equations, while nonlinear, can be solved using numerical methods to give a solution for r_{1} of 1621 meters. While this approach would be usable today with computers, it would have been a problem in World War I and II. During these conflicts, the solutions were developed using one of the following methods.

- graphically using hyperbolas drawn on paper (for a nice discussion of this procedure, see this LORAN example).
- Assuming the artillery is far away and using the asymptotes of the hyperbolas, which are lines, to find an approximate location of the artillery. A curvature correction could then be applied to get a more accurate bearing.
- Approximate solutions can be generated using sets of metal disks whose radii differ by small increments. By selecting three discs that approximate the situation in question, an approximate solution can be generated.

=== Advantages and disadvantages ===
Sound ranging has a number of advantages over other methods:

- Sound ranging is a passive method, which means that there are no emissions traceable back to the sound ranging equipment. This is different from radar, which emits energy that can be traced back to the transmitter.
- Sound ranging equipment tends to be small. It does not require large antennae nor large amounts of power.

Sound ranging also has a number of disadvantages:

- the speed of sound varies with temperature. Wind also introduces errors. There are means by which to compensate for these factors.
- at a distance, the sound of a gun is not a sharp crack but more of a rumble (this makes it difficult to accurately measure the exact arrival time of the wavefront at different sensors)
- guns cannot be located until they fire
- it can also be triggered by friendly artillery firing
- artillery is often fired in large numbers, which makes it difficult to determine which wavefront is associated with which artillery piece
- every microphone has to be placed with their coordinates known precisely
- each microphone has to have a communication channel to the recording apparatus. Before effective radio links appeared this meant field cable, which had to be laid and maintained to repair breaks from many causes

Military forces have found various ways to mitigate these problems, but nonetheless they do create additional work and reduce the accuracy of the method and the speed of its deployment.

== History ==
=== World War I ===
World War I saw the birth of scientific sound ranging. It brought together the necessary sensors, measurement technology, and analysis capabilities required to do effective sound ranging. Like many technology concepts, the idea of using sound to locate enemy artillery pieces came to a number of people at about the same time.

- The Russians claim to have used sound ranging before World War I.
- A German officer, Capt Leo Loewenstein, patented a method in 1913
- The French developed the first operational equipment
- The Americans proposed a scheme early in World War I

World War I provided the ideal environment for the development of sound ranging because:

- electrical processing of sound was becoming mature because of the development of telephone and recording technology
- the technology for recording sound was available (this facilitated making time difference measurements accurate to hundredths of a second)
- the need for counter battery artillery fire provided a strong technology driver

While the British were not the first to attempt the sound ranging of artillery, it was the British during World War I who actually fielded the first effective operational system. British sound ranging during that war began with crews that used both sound and flash detection. The sound ranging operators used equipment that augmented human hearing. Using the gun flash, the flash crew would determine a bearing to the gun using a theodolite or transit. The sound detection crew would determine the difference in time between the gun flash and the sound of the gun, which was used to determine the range of the gun. This provided the range and bearing data needed for counter battery fire. These methods were not very successful.

In mid-1915 the British assigned the scientist and Nobel Laureate Sir William Lawrence Bragg to the problem. Bragg was a Territorial officer of the Royal Horse Artillery in the British Army. When Bragg came onto the scene, sound ranging was slow, unreliable, and inaccurate. His first task was to investigate what was available, in particular looking at French efforts.

The French had made an important development. They had taken the string galvanometer and adapted it to record signals from microphones onto photographic film. This work had been done by Lucien Bull and Charles Nordmann (an astronomer at the Paris observatory). Processing the film took some minutes but this was not a significant drawback because artillery batteries did not move very frequently. However, the apparatus could not run continuously because of the expenditure of film. This meant that it had to be switched on when enemy guns fired, which necessitated the deployment of Advanced Posts (AP) in front of the microphones which could switch on the recording apparatus remotely via field cable. These Advanced Posts were connected back to a centrally located Flash Board, and this device enabled the observers to be sure they were all observing the same muzzle flash. When this had been established they could switch on the recording apparatus.

Bragg also found out that the nature of gun sounds was not well understood and that care needed to be taken to separate the sonic boom of the shell from the actual sound of the firing. This problem was solved in mid-1916 when one of Bragg's detachment, Lance Corporal William Sansome Tucker, formerly of the Physics Department, London University, invented the low-frequency microphone. This separated the low frequency sound made by the firing of the gun from the sonic boom of the shell. It used a heated platinum wire that was cooled by the sound wave of a gun firing.

Later in 1916 Tucker formed an experimental sound ranging section in UK and the following year techniques were developed to correct the sound data to compensate for meteorological conditions. Other matters were researched including the optimum layout and positioning of a "sound ranging base" – the array of microphones. It was found that a shallow curve and relatively short length base was best. With these improvements, enemy artillery could be located accurately to within 25 to 50 meters under normal circumstances.

The program was very well developed by the end of World War I. In fact, the method was expanded to determine the gun location, caliber, and the intended target. The British deployed many sound ranging sections on the Western Front and sections also operated in Italy, the Balkans and Palestine. When the US entered the war in 1917 they adopted the British equipment.

The German aural method was used by the Central Powers. This used an early warning listening post (LP) and a main LP in the centre with two secondary LPs 500–1000 metres slightly to the rear on either side. Stop watches were switched on when the sound reached the main LP, the secondary LP times were converted to a distance (via speed of sound) and circles plotted, another circle was then derived that touched these two circles and the main LP, the centre of this circle was the source of the sound. Corrections were made for conditions affecting the speed of sound. However, late in the war Germany introduced "objective devices" – directional galvanometers, oscillographs and modified seismographs, with results directly transferred onto paper or photographic film.

=== Between the World Wars ===
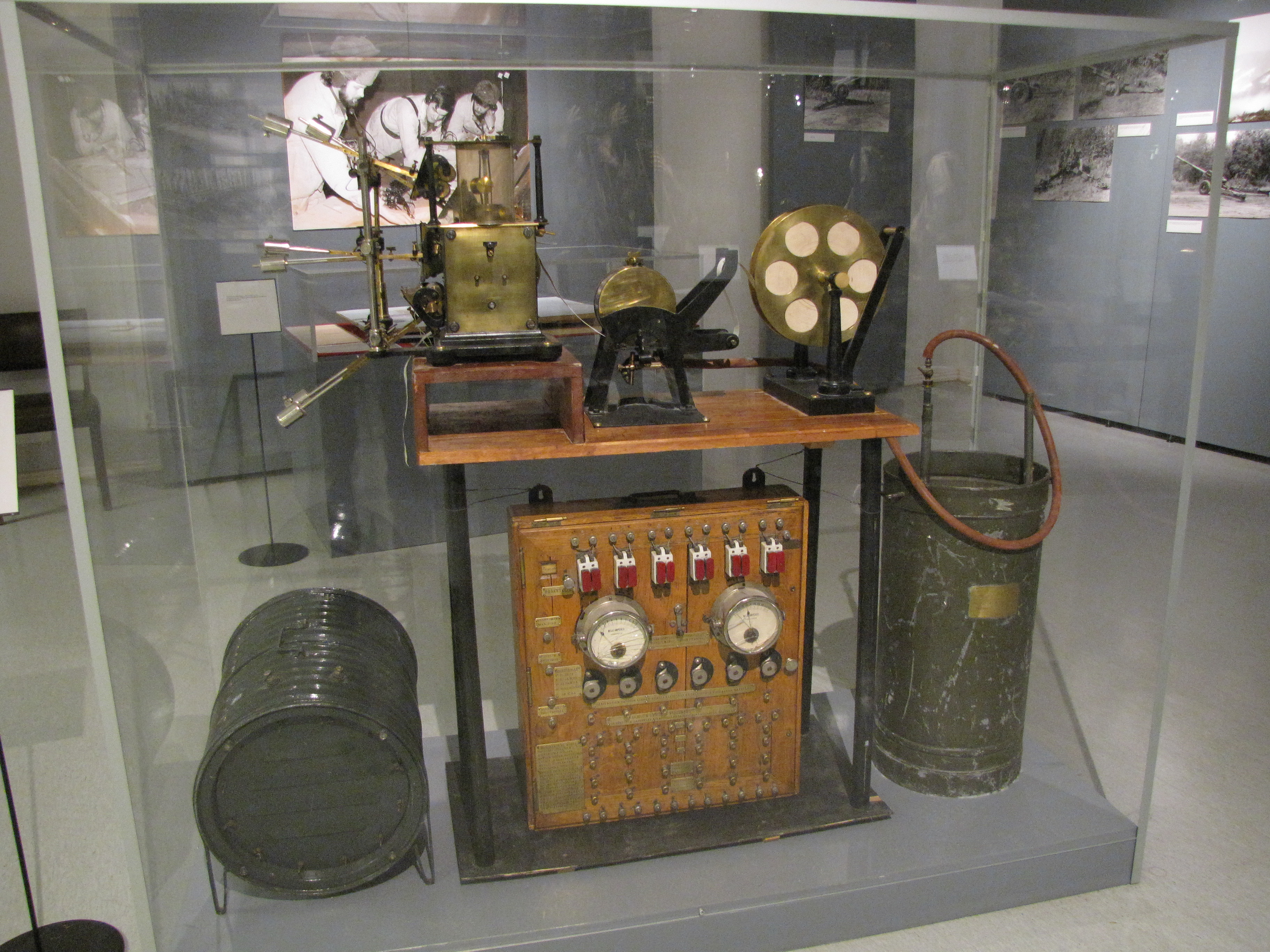
Recording unit of French sound ranging system from 1920s

British research continued between the wars as it did in other nations. It appears that in Britain this led to better microphones and recording apparatus using heat sensitive paper instead of photographic film. Radio link was also developed, although this could only connect the microphones to the recording apparatus, it did not enable the APs to switch on the recorder. Another innovation in the late 1930s was development of the comparator, a mechanical computer that calculated first order differential equations. It provided a fast means of comparing the coordinates of the fall of shot located by sound ranging with the coordinates of the target and hence deduction of a correction to the fall of shot.

=== World War II ===
During World War II, sound ranging was a mature technology and widely used, particularly by the British (in corps level artillery survey regiments) and Germans (in Beobachtungsabteilungen). Development continued and better equipment was introduced, particularly for locating mortars. At the end of the war the British also introduced multiplexing, which enabled microphones to share a common field cable to the recording apparatus. In 1944 it was found that radar could be used to locate mortars, but not guns or rockets. Although the radar could "see" the shells, their elliptic trajectories could not be solved.

The US Marines included sound ranging units as standard parts of their defense battalions. These sound ranging units were active in the Marines both before and during World War II. The US Army also used sound locators. US Army sound ranging units took part in nearly all battles in which the army participated after November 1942. By the end of the war there were 25 observation battalions with 13,000 men. During the Okinawa campaign, the US Army used its sound ranging sets to provide effective counter battery fire. The Japanese tried to counter this effective counter-battery fire with the tactic of "shoot and scoot", which means shooting a small number of rounds and leaving the firing position before the counter-battery fire could arrive. While an effective tactic against counter-battery fire, this approach tends to reduce the effectiveness of artillery fire.

During World War II, the British made extensive use of sound ranging. There are a number of excellent memoirs that address their use of sound ranging for artillery spotting available on the web, including "The 4th Durham Survey Regiment: Sounds like the Enemy" and "Communications for Artillery Location". A "Communications for Artillery Location" article describes the electronic equipment involved with these operations. A very comprehensive account of British sound ranging units including their positions is Massimo Mangilli-Climpson's 2007 account.

=== Korean War ===
Sound ranging of artillery was done in Korea, but mainly was supplanted by counter-mortar radar and aircraft-based artillery observers. Since anti-radar countermeasures were limited at this time and the UN had air superiority throughout the war, these approaches were simpler and more accurate.

=== Vietnam ===
Most counter battery work in Vietnam was with artillery spotting done using radar or aircraft. Australia deployed a sound ranging detachment from 1967 to 1970 in Vietnam, which operated a cross-base to provide all-round observation.

Also, during this period the British deployed ad hoc "Cracker" batteries, with sound ranging and mortar locating radars, to Borneo and Oman.

In the early 1970s an effective VHF radio link was introduced that enabled the APs to switch-on the recording apparatus. Soon after, advances in electronics meant that the manual plotting of bearings and some other calculations were replaced by electronic calculators.

=== Present day ===
Although effective gun-locating radars finally supplemented the counter-mortar radars from the late 1970s onwards, sound ranging is undergoing a renaissance, because some armies have retained it in spite of its drawbacks. It appears that some also recognised its potential to operate as an automatic advanced post (AP) for the radars.

==== Measurement of bearing ====
The British led the way in a new approach, developed by Roke Manor Research Limited, then Plessey, which had developed VHF radio-link sound ranging. This replaced each traditional sound-ranging base with a microphone cluster. Each comprised three microphones a few metres apart, a meteorological sensor and processing. Each unmanned cluster listened continuously for sound, calculated the bearing to the source and recorded other characteristics. These were automatically sent to a control post where they were automatically collated and the location of the sound source calculated. A minimum of two arrays is required for operation.

Prototypes of the new system, HALO (Hostile Artillery LOcating) were used in Sarajevo in 1995. The production system, ASP (Advanced Sound Ranging Project), entered British service in about 2001. Reportedly, it located hostile artillery at 50 km distance in Iraq in 2003. The UK designed systems are now manufactured by Leonardo S.p.A., (and also formerly under the BAE and Selex names) The same principle underpins the RAZK artillery sound ranging complex, developed independently in Ukraine from the Russian AZK-7M/1B33M system.

The US Acoustic Multi Mission Sensor (AMMS) also measures the bearing of sound sources. Each AMMS unit consists of two particle velocity probes and one microphone. The probes offer 2D bearing measurement while the microphone measures time-of-arrival, sound spectrum, and loudness. They have a small footprint and can therefore be installed on mobile platforms such as military vehicles. Usually these vehicles have enough space to host a hardwired subarray of four AMMS units, creating a sensor post dubbed the CASTLE. Hence, each sensor post has at least 12 acoustic sensors with relevant spatial distribution. These CASTLEs can be networked, using MANET radios. The Acoustic Vector Sensor (AVS) from the same company (Microflown) is similar in operating principle, only that it has three particle velocity probes for 3D bearing measurement. The AMMS has also been tested for locating of illegal use of fireworks.

==== Signal processing ====
Signal processing wise, sound ranging is moving away from processing muzzle blast noise signals because of several trends. One trend is longer-range artillery. Muzzle blast noise may attenuate down to a level no longer detectable at the sensor post, but even if it does, the speed of the sound being slow and modern artillery moving on after firing (shoot & scoot), obtaining a localization might be simply too late. Another trend is the increased prevalence of rockets that, having a self-propelled phase, hardly generate muzzle blast noise.

The more relevant signal is the 3D shockwave that is generated by the shell or bullet as long as it travels at supersonic speed. As compared to the muzzle blast noise, the 3D shockwave signal has a higher initial sound level, attenuates only in two directions, and usually comes from the sky when arriving at the sensor post. Moreover, the target acquisition time is no longer governed by the speed of the sound, but by the speed of the round – in practice more or less a reduction of 50%.

==== Deployment concept ====
The concept of operation should be based upon deploying the sensor posts on in-fleet vehicles being present in battlespace. On one hand, this makes the concept very affordable, as there are no operational costs for a dedicated task like a sound ranging regiment used to have. On the other hand, each sensor post provides close proximity awareness to each of the vehicles hosting the sensor post.

== See also ==
- Flash spotting
- Counter-battery fire
- Gunfire locator
