= NGC 2340 =

Galaxy in the constellation Lynx

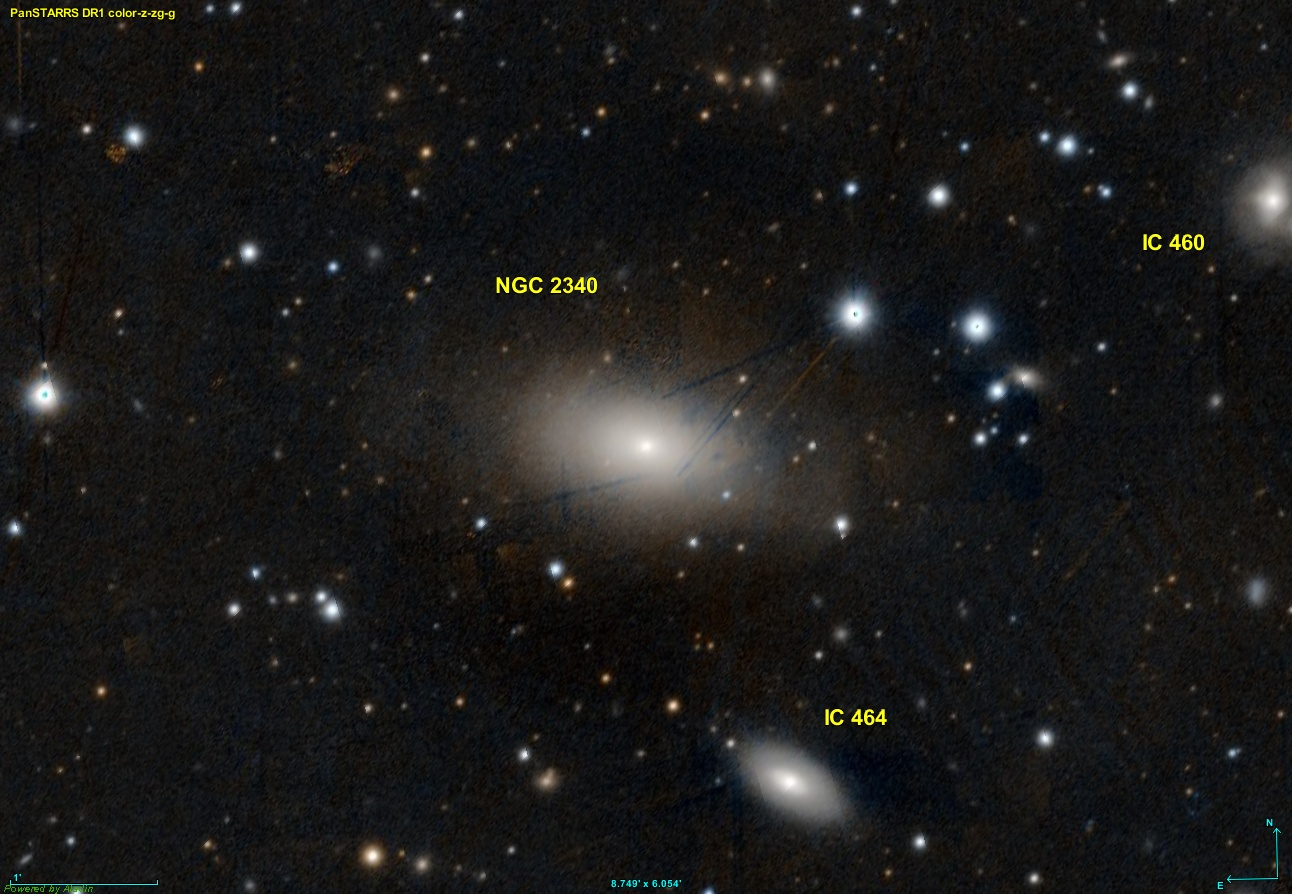
- NGC 2340 imaged by Pan-STARRS

Observation data (J2000 epoch)
- Constellation: Lynx
- Right ascension: 07^{h} 11^{m} 10.7950^{s}
- Declination: +50° 10′ 29.075″
- Redshift: 0.019764±0.0000250
- Heliocentric radial velocity: 5,925±7 km/s
- Distance: 315.77 ± 44.34 Mly (96.817 ± 13.596 Mpc)
- Apparent magnitude (V): 12.7

Characteristics
- Type: E
- Size: ~263,000 ly (80.64 kpc) (estimated)
- Apparent size (V): 1.8′ × 1.2′

Other designations
- 2MASX J07111080+5010288, UGC 3720, MCG +08-13-096, PGC 20338, CGCG 234-091

NGC 2340 is a large elliptical galaxy in the constellation of Lynx. Its velocity with respect to the cosmic microwave background is 6,008±9 km/s, which corresponds to a Hubble distance of 289.0 ± 20.3 Mly (88.61 ± 6.21 Mpc). However, six non-redshift measurements give a farther mean distance of 315.77 ± 44.34 Mly (96.817 ± 13.596 Mpc). It was discovered by German-British astronomer William Herschel on 9 February 1788.

NGC 2340 has a possible active galactic nucleus, i.e. it has a compact region at the center of a galaxy that emits a significant amount of energy across the electromagnetic spectrum, with characteristics indicating that this luminosity is not produced by the stars.

== Abell 569 member ==
NGC 2340 is a member of the Abell 569 galaxy cluster, which contains 85 galaxies, the brightest of which is NGC 2329.

== Supernova ==
One supernova has been observed in NGC 2340:

- SN 2025hlm (Type Ia-91bg-like, mag. 19.7586) was discovered by the Zwicky Transient Facility on 16 April 2025.

== See also ==
- List of NGC objects (2001–3000)
