= Louis Maillard (astronomer) =

French-born Swiss astronomer and professor

Louis Maillard (28 September 1867 – 7 January 1938) was a French-born Swiss astronomer and professor of astronomy and mathematical sciences.

In 1902 Maillard succeeded Charles Dufour in a professorship at the University of Lausanne. Maillard was a professor of astronomy and general mathematics or mathematical sciences. He was directeur des Écoles industrielle et commerciale et du collège mathématique du canton de Vaud. In 1906 he founded the Bulletin d'Astronomie of the University of Lausanne.

Maillard wrote in 1905 a position paper and in 1907 organized a committee for the purpose of creating an observatory for the University of Lausanne. The philanthropist Jean-Jacques Mercier-de Molin contributed a substantial sum of money for the project. In 1915 work on plans for the observatory were halted because of World War I. Furtherance of planning for the observatory was revived in 1924. In the spring of 1928 a 62-centimeter mirror was completed by E. Schaer. However, because of poor health, Maillard resigned his professorship in 1928 and work on the observatory continued under his successor Gustave Juvet.

In 1920 Maillard was an invited speaker at the International Congress of Mathematicians held at Strasbourg.

== Selected publications ==
- Cosmosgonie et Gravitation. 1922.
- Quand la lumière fut. Tome I. Les cosmogonies anciennes. 1922; 214 pp.
- Quand la lumière fut. Tome II. Les cosmogonies modernes. 1923; 281 pp.
