= Abell 569 =

Galaxy cluster in the constellation Lynx

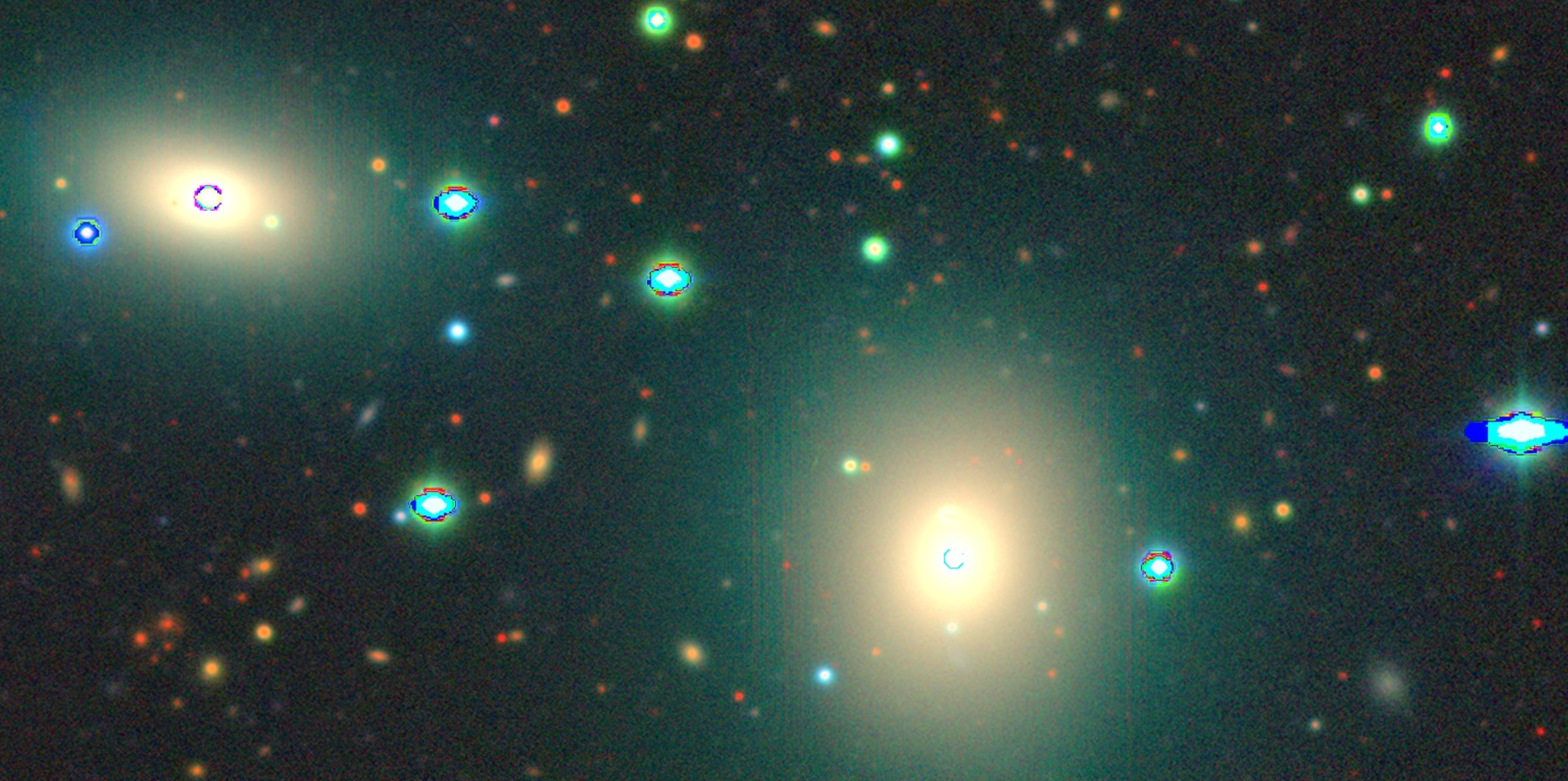
- Abell 569 seen by DESI Legacy Surveys DR11

Observation data (Epoch J2000)
- Constellation: Lynx
- Right ascension: 07^{h} 09^{m} 10.4^{s}
- Declination: +48° 37′ 10″
- Bautz–Morgan classification: II
- Velocity dispersion: 500
- Redshift: 0.019417

Other designations
- A 569

Abell 569 is a galaxy cluster in the northern constellation of Lynx. It is organized into two primary condensations that are separated by about 1.5 Mpc, and is probably a member of the Perseus Supercluster. The brightest galaxy in the cluster is NGC 2329, a giant elliptical galaxy of type D that is associated with a radio and X-ray source.

Abell 569 is a galaxy cluster located in the Supercluster 32 (SCL 32) along with 3 other members namely, Abell 568, Abell 581 and Abell 599 using estimated redshifts.

== See also ==
- Abell catalogue
- List of Abell clusters

== Gallery ==
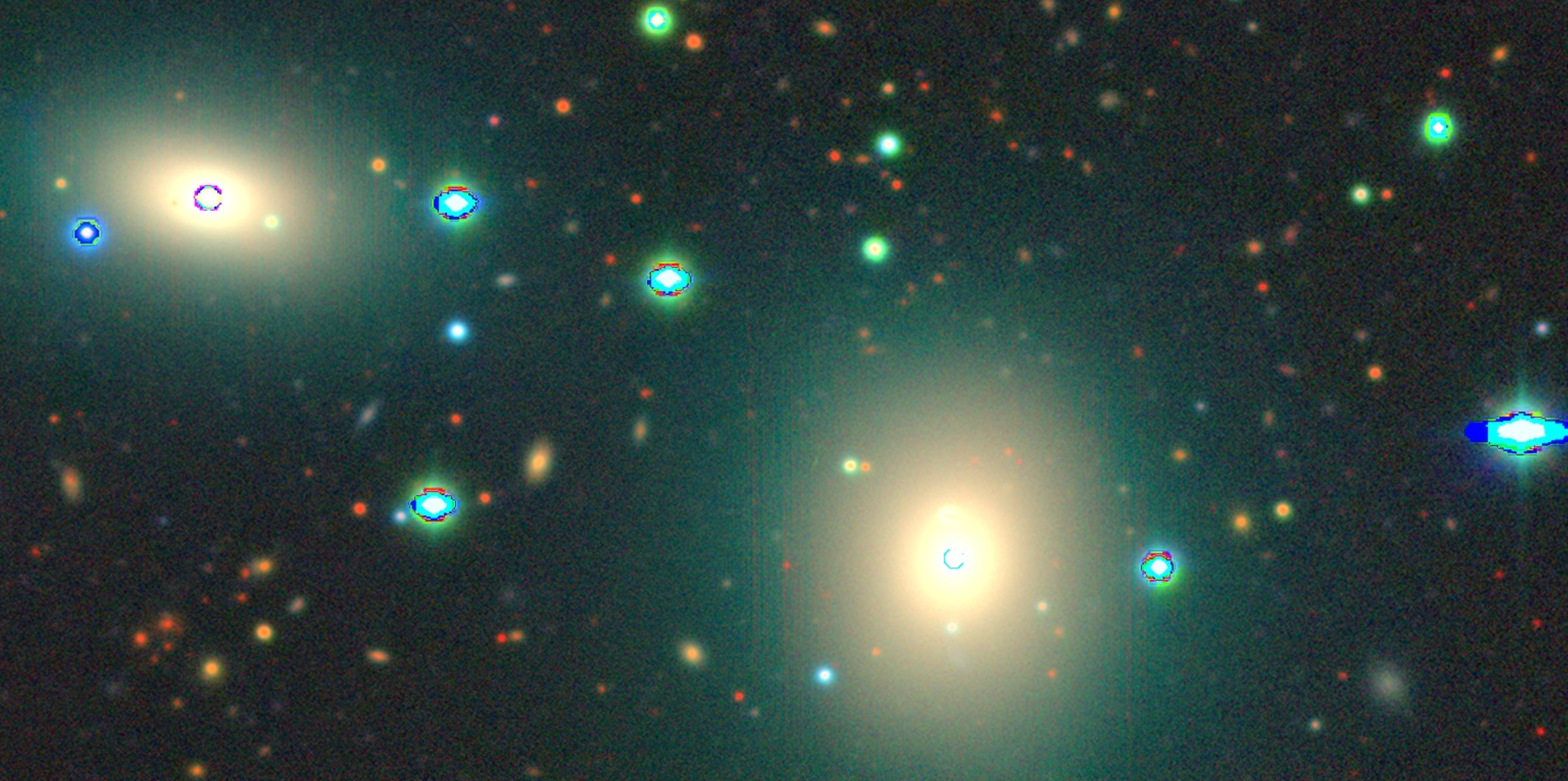
Abell 569 seen by DESI Legacy Surveys

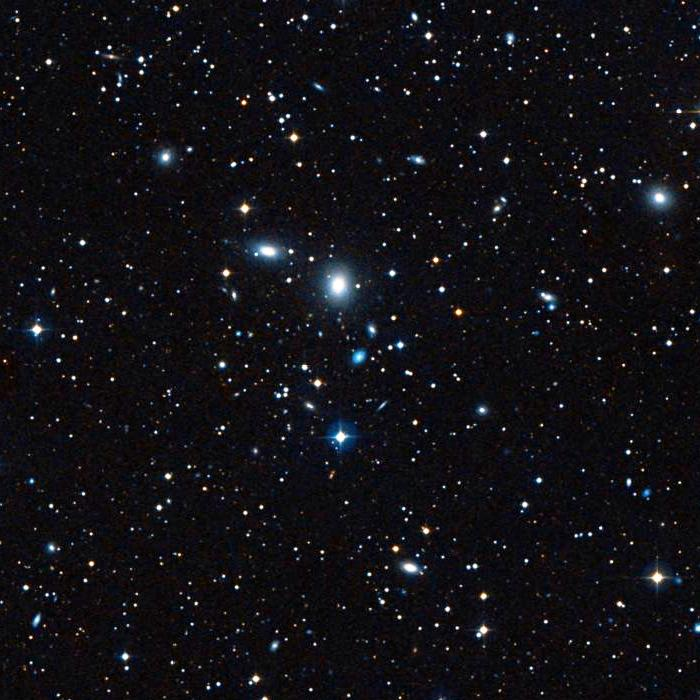
Abell 569
