= Frank Eisenhauer =

German astronomer

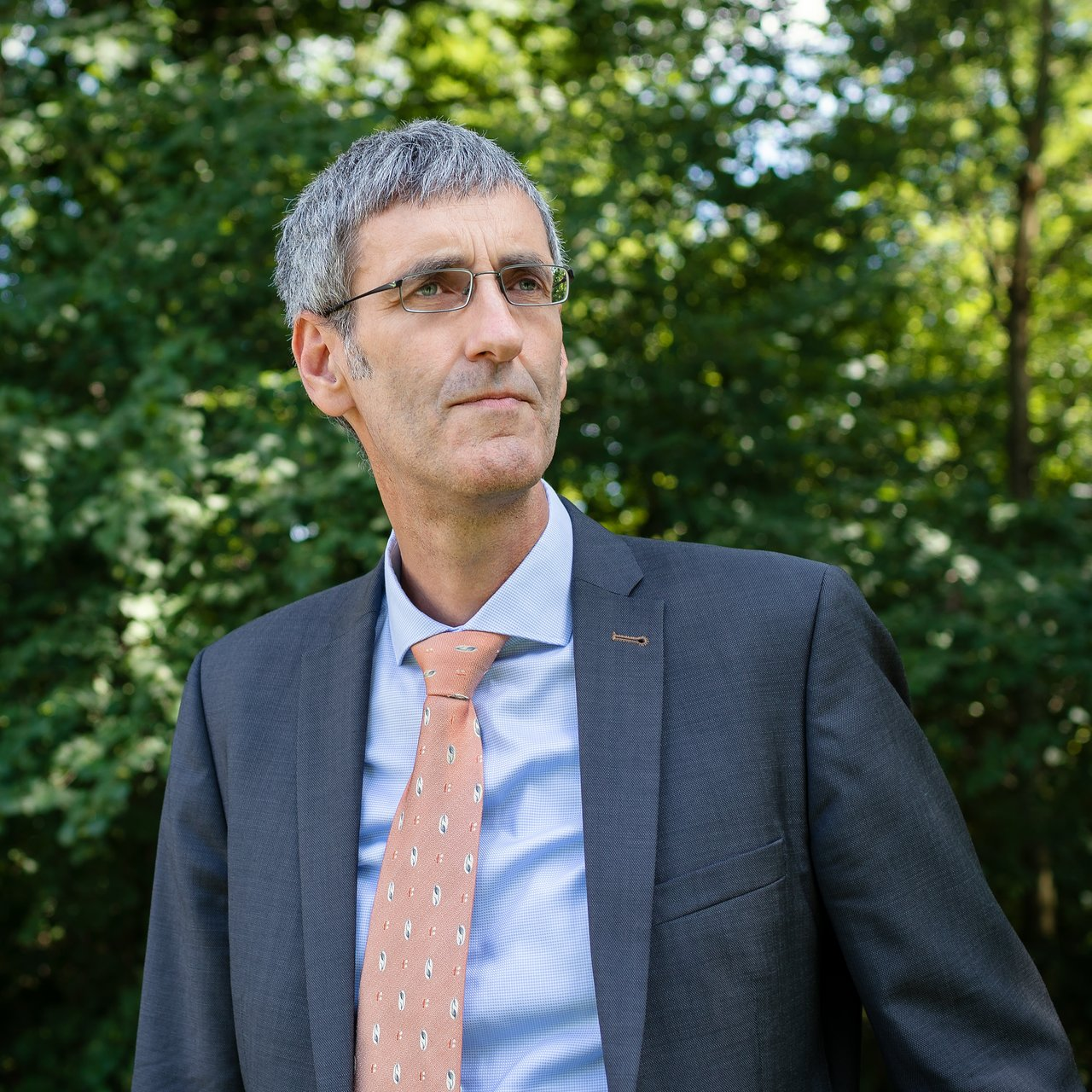
Frank Eisenhauer

Frank Eisenhauer (born 9 June 1968 in Augsburg) is a German astronomer and astrophysicist, scientific member of the Max Planck Society, director of the Max Planck Institute for Extraterrestrial Physics (MPE), and a professor at the Technical University of Munich (TUM). He is best known for his contributions to interferometry and spectroscopy and the study of the black hole at the centre of the Milky Way.

== Life ==
Eisenhauer grew up in Augsburg. In 1987, he graduated from the Justus-von-Liebig Gymnasium in Neusäß and then did his military service with the Mountain Signal Battalion 8 in Murnau. Eisenhauer is widowed, has three children and lives in Munich.

== Studies ==
Eisenhauer studied physics at the Technical University of Munich (TUM) (1988–1995) and has been working at the Max Planck Institute for Extraterrestrial Physics (MPE) since his diploma thesis in 1995. There, he wrote his doctoral thesis under later Nobel Laureate Reinhard Genzel and received his doctorate from LMU Munich in 1998. In 2011, Eisenhauer habilitated at TUM.

== Teaching ==
Eisenhauer is adjunct professor and TUM distinguished affiliated professor at TUM, where he teaches astrophysics and high-resolution astronomy.

== Science and research ==
As a director of the Max Planck Institute for Extraterrestrial Physics (MPE), Eisenhauer leads the development and scientific evaluation of large astronomical instruments. Eisenhauer has been instrumental in the development of astronomy with the highest spatial resolution and imaging spectroscopy, contributing in particular to the discovery and study of the black hole at the centre of the Milky Way.

Already in his doctoral thesis, Eisenhauer worked on infrared astronomy and developed an infrared camera with Fabry-Pérot spectrometer for the adaptive optics at the 3.6m telescope of the European Southern Observatory (ESO) in La Silla (Chile). Subsequently, as Principal Investigator, he led the development of the SPIFFI/SINFONI spectrometer at the ESO Very Large Telescope in Paranal (Chile), which, with a then unique combination of adaptive optics and imaging spectroscopy, not only corrects for the interference caused by the Earth's atmosphere, but also simultaneously records a spectrum for each pixel in the image. In 2003, this enabled Eisenhauer and colleagues to measure the distance to the centre of the Milky Way from the orbit of the star S2 for the first time using geometric methods, and by measuring the radial velocities of several stars, they were able to confirm the assumption that a supermassive black hole is located there.

Since 2005, Eisenhauer has been principal investigator of the GRAVITY experiment, which connects the European Southern Observatory's four Very Large Telescopes in Paranal, Chile, together as stellar interferometers, achieving an angular resolution equivalent to that of a 130-metre diameter telescope. Similar to adaptive optics, GRAVITY actively corrects for the interfering influences of the Earth's atmosphere and disturbances in the light path between the telescope and the laboratory, improving sensitivity by several orders of magnitude compared to previous experiments. In 2018, this enabled Eisenhauer and colleagues to detect, in particular, the redshift in the gravitational field of a black hole predicted from Albert Einstein's theory of general relativity. The same team also succeeded in 2020 in detecting the Schwarzschild precession (orbit comparison Newton and Einstein) in the orbit of the star S2. The geometric measurement of the distance to the Galactic centre and the detection of the gravitational redshift in the black hole's gravitational field were confirmed by Andrea Ghez and colleagues with observations at the Keck Observatory on Hawaii.

Other breakthroughs form the GRAVITY interferometer include the detection of orbital motions near the last stable circular orbit of the massive black hole SgrA*, the spatially resolved dynamical measurement of black hole masses of quasars, first direct detection of an exoplanet by optical interferometry, and first resolution of microlensed images.

The SINFONI and GRAVITY instruments are part of the instrument suite employed in the discovery and characterization of the Galactic Center Black Hole, for which Reinhard Genzel and Andrea Ghez have been awarded the 2020 Nobel Prize in Physics.

Since 2020, Eisenhauer is also principal investigator of GRAVITYPlus to upgrade the VLT Interferometer with wide-field fringe tracking and laser guide star adaptive optics. The wide field mode has been implemented in the period 2019-2022, the new adaptive optics in 2024. The laser guide stars will be available starting 2026.

The MPE IR/Submm department of Frank Eisenhauer and Reinhard Genzel also leads the development of MICADO, a first-light camera and spectrograph for the European Extremely Large Telescope (ELT).

Other areas of research to which Eisenhauer's observations have contributed include galaxy dynamics in the early universe, active galactic nuclei, and star formation in massive star clusters.

== Awards and honours ==
- TUM Distinguished Affiliated Professor of the Technical University of Munich
- Instrument Development Award 2023 by Astronomische Gesellschaft for development of SINFONI and GRAVITY Instruments
- Gruber Prize in Cosmology 2022 for designing instruments that collected evidence for a black hole at the center of our galaxy
- Stern–Gerlach Medal 2022 of the German Physical Society for the pioneering work in high-resolution infrared astronomy
- Jackson-Gwilt Medal 2022 from the Royal Astronomical Society for the development of astronomical instrumentation
- Foreign associate to the French Academy of Sciences in 2021
- Tycho Brahe Medal 2021 from the European Astronomical Society for the leadership of the SINFONI and GRAVITY instruments
- Michelson Investigator Achievement Award 2020 for the groundbreaking results of VLTI-GRAVITY

== Memberships ==
- Max Planck Society
- International Astronomical Union, Paris
- Astronomical Society, Heidelberg
- European Astronomical Society (EAS), Geneva
- German Physical Society (DPG), Bad Honnef
