= Jean Kovalevsky =

French astronomer (1929–2018)

Jean Kovalevsky (May 18, 1929 – August 17, 2018) was a French astronomer, specializing in celestial mechanics. He is known as a primary initiator (with Pierre Lacroute) and a leader of the Hipparcos space experiment.

== Biography ==
Born in Neuilly-sur-Seine, Kovalevsky was the son of Russian immigrants and grew up bilingual in Russian and French. He studied from 1951 to 1955 at the École normale supérieure graduating with the agrégation in mathematics in 1954. He held from 1955 to 1960 the positions attaché de techerche and then chargé de recherche (CR) at the Paris Observatory. He was from 1957 to 1959 a graduate student and research assistant at Yale University. In 1959 he received his doctorate at Yale from Dirk Brouwer on the movement of the 8th moon of Jupiter.

From 1960 to 1971 Kovalevsky was head of celestial mechanics at the Bureau des Longitudes. Celestial mechanics experienced a new boom in the Sputnik age and he published an introduction to the subject, which also considered the orbits of artificial satellites. At the Bureau des Longitudes he founded the Service des Calculs et de Mécanique Céleste, where he developed new calculation methods using computer algebra methods, which were constantly improved over time with his collaborators. From 1971 to 1978 he was head of the research group spatial geodesy (Groupe de recherches de géodésie spatiale, GRGS), which was also supported by the French space agency Centre national d'études spatiales (CNES). In 1979 he and Jean Delhaye led an astronomical delegation visiting China.

From 1974 to 1982 Kovalevsky was the first director of the Centre de recherches en géodynamique et astrométrie (CERGA) in Grasse, which in 1988 merged with the Nice Observatory to become the Observatoire de la Côte d'Azur. From 1982 to 1987 he was an astronomer in CERGA, but he resigned as CERGA's director so that he could work on the data analysis for the Fundamental Astronomy by Space Techniques (FAST) consortium for double star data reduction. From 1987 to 1992 he was again CERGA's director. In 1994 he retired as astronomer emeritus.

Kovalevsky died in 2018 in Saint-Laurent-du-Var. He was predeceased by his wife and survived by three children, six grandchildren, and seven great-grandchildren. He was a churchwarden and benefactor of the Russian Orthodox parish of Antibes.

== Research ==
He dealt with celestial mechanics (with a focus on methods for calculating the orbits of artificial satellites, as well as the moons of planets and the Earth's moon) and astrometry. With František Link (1906–1984), he estimated the diameter, flattening, and optical properties of Neptune's upper atmosphere. At the Paris Observatory, Kovalevsky's group developed advanced computer algorithms for celestial mechanics that were also used in the Gaia mission (the INPOP software). In astrometry, he was involved in the Hipparcos mission to accurately measure the proper motion and parallax of 118,000 stars. He initiated the European phase of Hipparcos preparation at a meeting in Frascati in 1974 and lobbied tirelessly until the European Space Agency (ESA) decided in 1980 to fund the mission in 1980. He was also involved in Gaia (the successor to Hipparcos) as a member of the working group Reference Frame and Relativity. Despite declining health, he still worked on the first data from Gaia. He was also involved in the geodesy program of the French satellites D1A (Diapason) and D1C and D1D, as well as in the international geodesy program International Satellite Geodesy Experiment (ISAGEX) 1972/73.

== Awards, honors, and memberships ==
From the Académie des Sciences, Kovalevsky received in 1963 the Prix Damoiseau, in 1979 the Prix Jules Janssen, and in 1984 the Prix Alexandre Joannidès. He received in 1966 and again in 1971 the silver medal of the CNES. In 1999 he received the ESA Director of Science Medal for the Hipparcos mission (along with Lennart Lindegren, Erik Høg and Catherine Turon). He received in 2009 the Prix Georges Lemaître.

He became in 1974 a corresponding member and in 1988 a full member of the Académie des sciences. He was also an external member of the Russian Academy of Metrology, a full member of the Academia Europaea (1989) and an external member of the academy in Turin (1989). He was from 1995 to 2004 the president of the Bureau national de métrologie and from 1997 to 2004 the president of the Comité International des Poids et Mesures (CIPM). He was a member of the American Astronomical Society (for 6 decades) and the International Academy of Astronautics.

He was appointed Knight of the Legion of Honour, Commander of the Ordre national du Mérite, and Officer of the Palmes Académiques. He received Brazil's Grand Cross of the National Order of Merit for Science.

== Selected publications ==
=== Articles ===
- Méthode numérique de calcul des perturbations générales: application au VIII^{e} satellite de Jupiter, Bulletin Astronomique, Tome 22, 1959, pp. 1–83 (Dissertation) Bibcode:1959BuAst..23....1K
- Sur le mouvement d’un satellite à inclinaison et excentricité quelconque, C. R. Acad. Sci., Tome 258, Nombre 18, 1964, pp. 4435–4438
- with François Barlier: Géodésie terrestre et géodésie par satellites, Space Science Reviews, vol. 7, 1967, pp. 89–134 doi:10.1007/bf00173116
- with F. Barlier and Irène Stellmacher: Liaison Nice—Beyrouth a l’aide des observations du Satellite D1A, Bulletin géodésique, Tome 93, Nombre 1, 1969, pp. 235–242 doi:10.1007/bf02521866
- with Annick Bec-Borsenberger: Convergence of a literal solution of Lunar theory, in: Natural and Artificial Satellite Motion, 1979, pp. 83–98
- with Michel Froeschlé: The connection of a catalogue of stars with the extragalactic reference frame, Astronomy and astrophysics, I, vol. 115, 1982, pp. 89–97 Bibcode:1982A&A...116...89F
- McNally, Derek, ed. (1994). "Chapter 9. Environmental Effects on Astronomical Observations by Jean Kovalevsky". The Vanishing Universe: Adverse Environmental Impacts on Astronomy; Proceedings of the conference sponsored by Unesco, held at Unesco, Paris, June 30–July 2, 1992. Cambridge University Press. pp. 59–63. ISBN 978-0-521-45020-1.
- with 17 coauthors: Construction of the intermediate Hipparcos astrometric catalogue, Astronomy & Astrophysics, vol. 304, 1995, pp. 34–43 Bibcode:1995A&A...304...34K
- with 24 coauthors: The Hipparcos catalogue as a realisation of the extragalactic reference system, Astronomy & Astrophysics, vol. 323, 1997, pp. 620–633 abstract

=== Books ===
- Introduction à la mécanique céleste, Paris: A. Colin 1963 (translated into English in 1967 and into Chinese in 1984)
  - Introduction to Celestial Mechanics, Reidel 1967
- with J. J. Levallois: Géodésie générale, Tome 4, Paris: Eyrolles 1971
- Astrométrie moderne, Springer Verlag 1990 (translated into English in 1995 and into Russian in 2004)
  - Modern Astrometry, Springer Verlag 1995; Kovalevsky, Jean (22 January 2002). 2002 edition. Springer. ISBN 0-521-64216-7. Kovalevsky, Jean; Kenneth Seidelmann, P. (26 January 2012). 2012 edition. Cambridge University Press. ISBN 9780521173315.
- with P. Kenneth Seidelmann: Fundamentals of Astrometry, Cambridge University Press 2004 ISBN 978-1-139-45317-2
- as editor with V. A. Brumberg: Relativity in celestial mechanics and astrometry: high precision dynamical theories and observational verifications, IAU Symposium, Leningrad 1985, Dordrecht: Reidel 1986
- as editor with Ivan I. Mueller and Barbara Kolaczek: Reference frames in astronomy and geophysics, Kluwer 1989; Kovalevsky, Jean; Mueller, Ivan I.; Kolaczek, Barbara (6 December 2012). 2012 pbk reprint of 1989 1st edition. Springer. ISBN 9789400909335.
- as editor with Seidelmann: Applications of computer technology to dynamical astronomy, IAU Colloq. Gaithersburg/Maryland 1988, Kluwer 1989; Kenneth Seidelmann, P.; Kovalevsky, Jean (6 December 2012). 2012 pbk reprint. Springer. ISBN 9789400909854.
