= Michael Perryman =

British astronomer

- Education: University of Cambridge
- Known for: Hipparcos project; Gaia project
- Awards: Prix Jules Janssen (1996); George Darwin Lectureship (1998); Academy Medal of the Royal Netherlands Academy of Arts and Sciences (1999); Honorary Doctorate Lund University (2010); Tycho Brahe Prize (2011); Shaw Prize (2022)
- Scientific career
- Fields: Astronomy, Astrometry

Michael Perryman (21 September 1954 in Luton) is a British astronomer, known for his work leading the Hipparcos and Gaia space astrometric projects.

== Education ==
Michael Perryman studied theoretical physics at Cambridge University and received his doctorate from the Cavendish Laboratory, Cambridge University, in 1979.

=== Hipparcos ===
He joined the ESA in 1980, where he headed the Hipparcos astrometric project as Project Scientist from 1981 till 1997. After the satellite failed to reach its target geostationary orbit, he also took over the mission management, the project eventually recovering all and more of its original scientific objectives.

=== Gaia ===
In 1993, together with Lennart Lindegren, he jointly proposed a more ambitious astrometric mission to take advantage of technological advances such as CCDs (unavailable for Hipparcos) and large lightweight mirrors. In 1995, Perryman was named study scientist for the new mission concept, named Gaia. The mission was approved by ESA's Science Programme Committee in 2000 and Perryman appointed project scientist. He led the Gaia project till the Critical Design Review in 2008, establishing the payload concept, technical feasibility, operational and data analysis principles, its organisation structure, and coordinating its scientific case, leading to its successful launch in 2013.

=== Institutions ===
He was Professor of Astronomy at Leiden University from 1993 to 2009. In 2010, he held a joint position at Heidelberg University and the Max Planck Institute for Astronomy, Heidelberg, and since 2012 he has been adjunct professor at University College Dublin. He was Bohdan Paczynski visiting professor at Princeton in 2013.

=== Recognitions ===
The main belt asteroid 10969 Perryman has been named in recognition of his contributions to astrometry. In 1996 Perryman received the Prix Jules Janssen of the Société astronomique de France. In 1999 he was awarded the Academy Medal by the Royal Netherlands Academy of Arts and Sciences. In 2011 he was awarded the Tycho Brahe Prize of the European Astronomical Society for his crucial role in the fostering of high precision, global stellar astrometry from space, in particular the development of the Hipparcos mission. In 2022 he received the Shaw Prize in Astronomy jointly with Lennart Lindegren.
