= Anton Zensus =

German radio astronomer (born 1958)

J. Anton Zensus
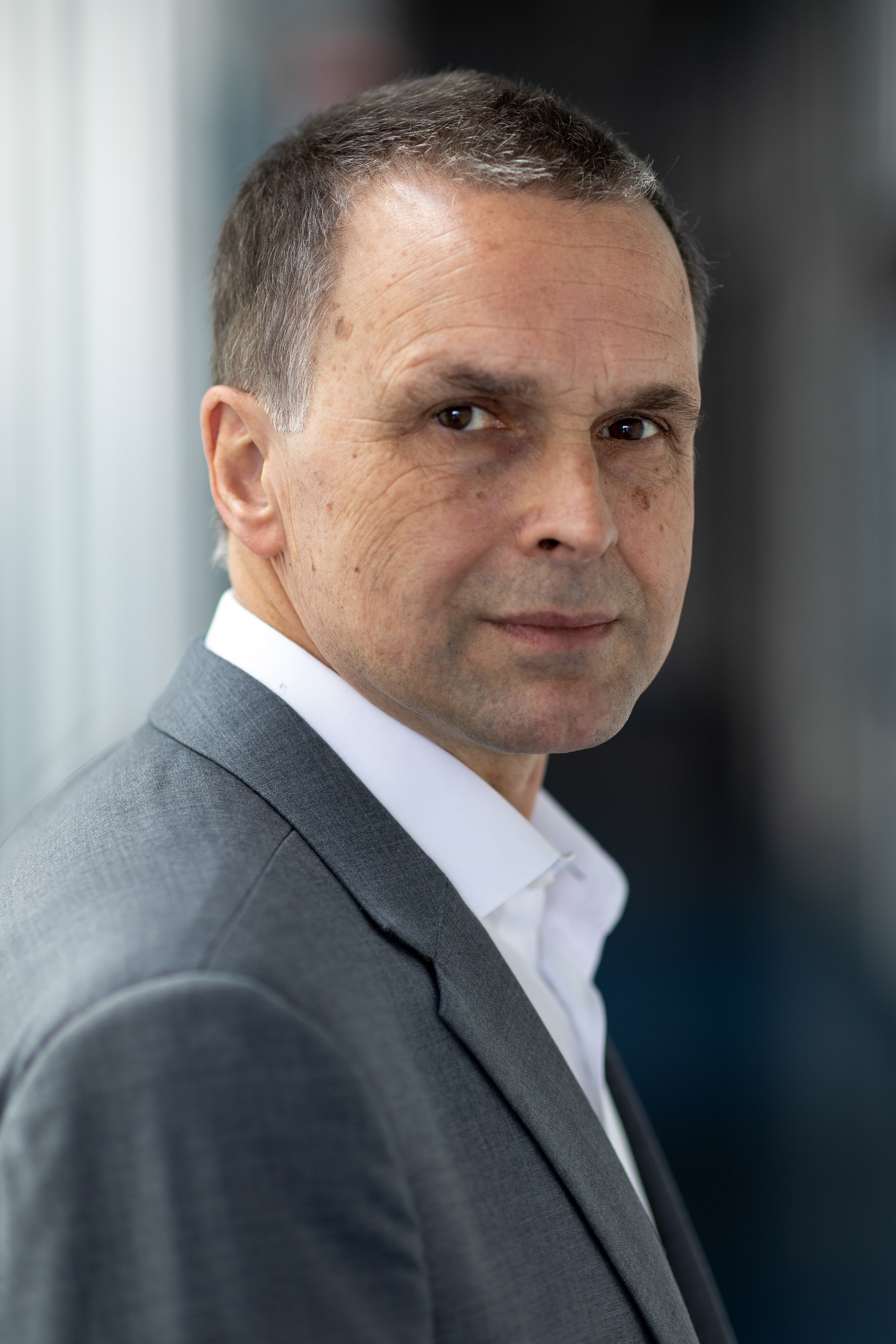
- Anton Zensus (2019)
- Born: 1 February 1958 (age 68); Bremerhaven, Germany
- Education: University of Münster
- Known for: VLBI, radio astronomy
- Scientific career
- Fields: Astrophysics, Radio Astronomy
- Workplaces: Max Planck Institute for Radio Astronomy

Johann Anton Zensus (born 1 February 1958, in Bremerhaven) is a German radio astronomer. He is director at the Max Planck Institute for Radio Astronomy (MPIfR) and honorary professor at the University of Cologne. He is the founding chair of the collaboration board of the Event Horizon Telescope (EHT). The collaboration announced the first image of a black hole in April 2019.

== Career and research ==
Zensus studied physics and astronomy in Cologne, Münster and Bonn and received his doctorate at the University of Münster in 1984. From 1985 to 1988 he worked as a post-doctoral fellow at Caltech and then as a research assistant at the National Radio Astronomy Observatory (NRAO) in Charlottesville. In 1997 he was appointed scientific member of the Max Planck Society and director at the MPIfR in Bonn. He has been an adjunct scientist at NRAO since 2001 and teaches as an Honorary Professor at the University of Cologne since 2005.

As head of the research department for Very Long Baseline Interferometry (VLBI) at the MPIfR, his main research interest are extragalactic radio sources and active galactic nuclei, which he investigates with the VLBI method using radio telescopes on all continents and in space. His research group made decisive contributions to increasing the angular resolution and quality of radio astronomical images with VLBI by integrating the space-bound RadioAstron antenna into the VLBI system of radio telescopes and by developing VLBI with short wavelengths in the millimeter and sub-millimeter wavelength range. His group contributed to the integration of multi-antenna radio observatories (arrays) into the VLBI system by the so-called phasing technique, in which the antennas of an array are synchronized to form a single instrument by special software.

Since 2017 Zensus has been coordinator of the European RadioNet consortium, in which institutions from 13 European countries participate. As Founding Chair of the Collaboration Board of the Event Horizon Telescope (EHT), Zensus has coordinated international efforts to map supermassive black holes in the universe.

Using RadioAstron and earth bound radio telescopes, Zensus was part of a team that imaged the origin region of the relativistic plasma jet around the supermassive black hole of the nucleus of the galaxy NGC 1275 (Perseus A). The observations suggested that the origin of this jet originates from a broader region than previously thought (namely the accretion disk instead of the ergosphere of the black hole).

With another worldwide interconnection of radio telescopes, the Global Millimeter VLBI Array (GMVA), Zensus was involved in a radio astronomical observation of the supermassive black hole in the center of the Milky Way (Sagittarius A*) at a resolution not previously achieved.

Through the technical developments, observations, imaging efforts and scientific contributions of his group, and through the coordination of the international EHT observation consortium, Zensus contributed decisively to the image of a supermassive black hole in Messier 87, which was published in April 2019 and is the first direct picture of a black hole. The EHT collaboration also succeeded in publishing the first image of the black hole in the center of the Milky Way.

== Personal life ==
Zensus is married and has two adult sons. He is a native speaker of German and fluent in English.

== Honors and prizes ==
- 1994 Humboldt Prize (Alexander von Humboldt Foundation)
- 1999 Max Planck Research Prize (Max Planck Society)
- 2013 Golden Medal of Merit (Institute for Applied Astronomy, Sankt Petersburg)
- 2019 Breakthrough Prize in Fundamental Physics as part of the EHT Collaboration
- 2021 Advanced Grant of the European Research Council funded with 2.5 M€ to observe the magnetic fields in the immediate vicinity of a black hole's event horizon.
- 2023 Tycho Brahe Medal of the European Astronomical Society "for major advances in Very Long Baseline Interferometry that led to the first images of the shadow of the black holes in the galaxy M87 and in our own Galactic centre".
- 2024 Karl Schwarzschild Medal of the Astronomische Gesellschaft "recognizing his leading role in the development of radio astronomical observation methods with very high angular resolution and sensitivity".
