= Reinhard Genzel =

German astrophysicist (born 1952)

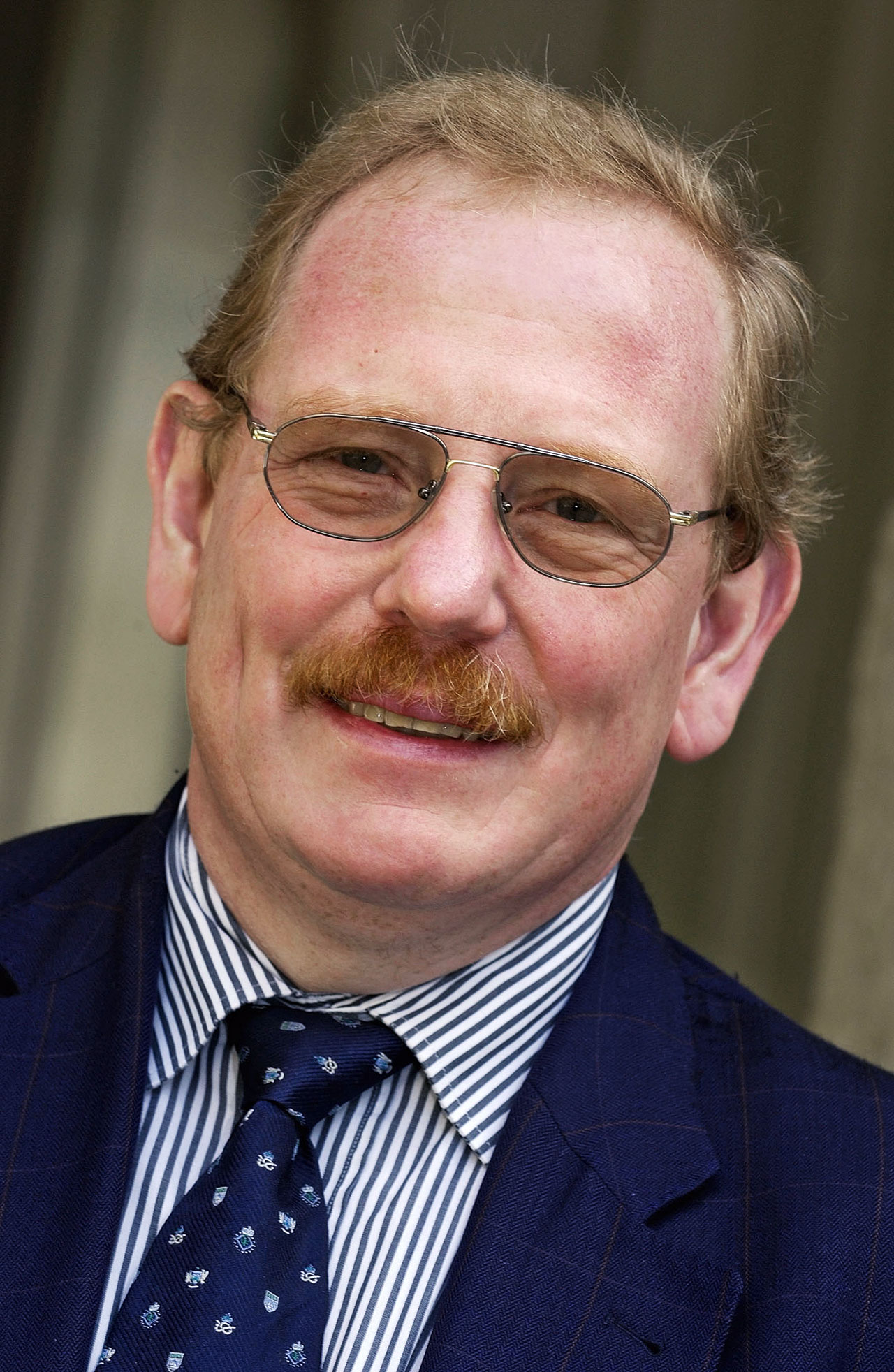
- Genzel in 2012
- Born: 24 March 1952 (age 74); Bad Homburg vor der Höhe, West Germany
- Education: University of Freiburg (BSc); University of Bonn (MSc, DPhil)
- Known for: Infrared astronomy Submillimetre astronomy
- Awards: Otto Hahn Medal (1980); Balzan Prize (2003); Shaw Prize (2008); Crafoord Prize (2012); Tycho Brahe Prize (2012); Fellow of the Royal Society; Harvey Prize (2014); Nobel Prize in Physics (2020)
- Scientific career
- Fields: Astrophysics
- Workplaces: Max Planck Institute for Extraterrestrial Physics; University of California, Berkeley
- Thesis: Beobachtung von H_{2}O-Masern in Gebieten von OB-Sternentstehung (1978)
- Doctoral advisor: Peter Georg Mezger

Reinhard Genzel ForMemRS (German pronunciation: [ˈʁaɪnhaʁt ˈɡɛntsl̩]; born 24 March 1952) is a German astrophysicist, co-director of the Max Planck Institute for Extraterrestrial Physics, a professor at LMU Munich and an emeritus professor at the University of California, Berkeley. He was awarded the 2020 Nobel Prize in Physics "for the discovery of a supermassive compact object at the centre of our galaxy", which he shared with Andrea Ghez and Roger Penrose. In a 2021 interview given to Federal University of Pará in Brazil, Genzel recalls his journey as a physicist; the influence of his father, Ludwig Genzel; his experiences working with Charles H. Townes; and more.

== Life and career ==
Genzel was born in Bad Homburg vor der Höhe, Germany, the son of Eva-Maria Genzel and Ludwig Genzel, a professor of solid state physics (1922–2003). He studied physics at the University of Freiburg and the University of Bonn, graduating in 1978 with a PhD in radioastronomy which he prepared at the Max Planck Institute for Radio Astronomy. Subsequently he worked at the Center for Astrophysics | Harvard & Smithsonian in Cambridge, Massachusetts. He was a Miller Fellow from 1980 until 1982, and also Associate and finally Full Professor in the Department of Physics at the University of California, Berkeley from 1981. In 1986, he left Berkeley to become a director at the Max Planck Institute for Extraterrestrial Physics in Garching and Scientific Member of the Max-Planck-Gesellschaft. During that time he also lectured at LMU Munich, where he has been Honorary Professor since 1988. From 1999 to 2016, he also had a part-time joint appointment as Full Professor at the University of California, Berkeley. Additional activities include sitting on the selection committee for the Shaw Prize in astronomy.

== Work ==
Reinhard Genzel studies infrared- and submillimetre astronomy. He and his group are active in developing ground- and space-based instruments for astronomy. They used these to track the motions of stars at the centre of the Milky Way, around Sagittarius A*, and show that they were orbiting a very massive object, now known to be a black hole. Genzel is also active in studies of the formation and evolution of galaxies.

In July 2018, Reinhard Genzel et al. reported that star S2 orbiting Sgr A* had been recorded at 7,650 km/s or 2.55% the speed of light leading up to the pericentre approach in May 2018 at about 120 AU ≈ 1400 Schwarzschild radii from Sgr A*. This allowed them to test the redshift predicted by general relativity at relativistic velocities, finding additional confirmation of the theory.

== Awards ==
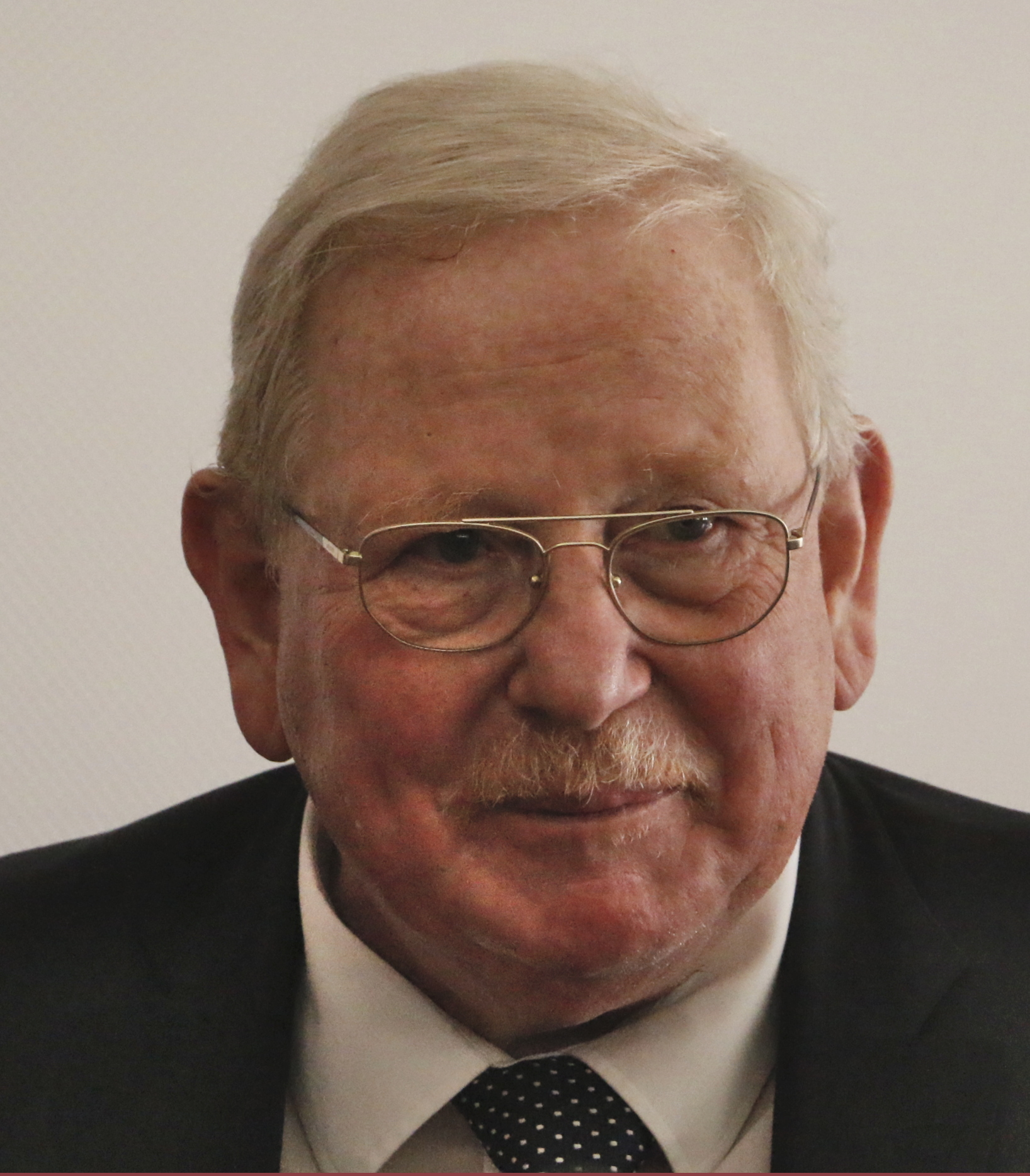
Reinhard Genzel in 2023

- Studienstiftung des deutschen Volkes, 1973–1975
- Miller Research Fellowship, 1980–1982
- Otto Hahn Medal, Max-Planck-Gesellschaft, 1980
- Presidential Young Investigator Award, National Science Foundation, 1984
- Newton Lacy Pierce Prize, American Astronomical Society, 1986
- Gottfried Wilhelm Leibniz Prize, Deutsche Forschungsgemeinschaft, 1990
- De Vaucouleurs Medal, University of Texas, 2000
- Prix Jules Janssen, Société astronomique de France (French Astronomical Society), 2000
- Stern Gerlach Medal for experimental physics, Deutsche Physikalische Gesellschaft, 2003
- Balzan Prize for Infrared Astronomy, 2003
- Albert Einstein Medal, 2007
- Shaw Prize, 2008
- "Galileo 2000" Prize, 2009
- Dr. h.c. Leiden University, 2010
- Karl Schwarzschild Medal, Deutsche Astronomische Gesellschaft, 2011
- Crafoord Prize, Royal Swedish Academy, 2012
- Tycho Brahe Prize, European Astronomical Society, 2012
- Pour le Mérite, 2013
- Dr. h.c. University of Paris, 2014
- Harvey Prize, Technion Institute, Israel, 2014
- Herschel Medal, Royal Astronomical Society, 2014
- Nobel Prize in Physics, 2020
- Bavarian Maximilian Order for Science and Art, 2021
- Dr. h.c. Grenoble Alpes University, 2023
- Rectorat's Medal University of Chile, 2025
- Bavarian Constitutional Order, 2025
- Ioannes Marcus Marci Medal 2026

== Membership of scientific societies ==
- Fellow of the American Physical Society, 1985
- Foreign member of the Académie des Sciences (Institut de France), 1998
- Foreign member of the United States National Academy of Sciences, 2000
- Member of the Deutsche Akademie der Naturforscher Leopoldina, 2002
- Senior member of the Bayerische Akademie der Wissenschaften, 2003
- Member of the Royal Academy of Exact, Physical and Natural Sciences of Spain, 2010
- Foreign member of the Royal Spanish Academy of Sciences, 2011
- Foreign member of the Royal Society of London, 2012
- Member of the Pontifical Academy, 2020
- Heinrich Hertz Professorship at the Karlsruhe Institute Technology (KIT)
