= Shaw Prize =

Science prizes established by Run Run Shaw

- The obverse of the Shaw Prize medal
- Awarded for: Outstanding contributions in astronomy, life science and medicine, and mathematical sciences
- Reward: US$1.2 million
- First award: 2004
- Website: www.shawprize.org

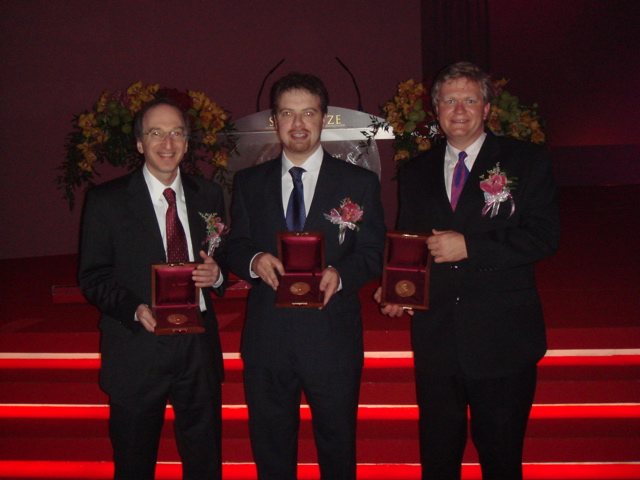
Saul Perlmutter, Adam Riess and Brian P. Schmidt (from left to right) jointly won the 2006 astronomy prize

The Shaw Prize is a set of three annual awards presented by the Shaw Prize Foundation in the fields of astronomy, medicine and life sciences, and mathematical sciences. Established in 2002 in Hong Kong, by Hong Kong entertainment mogul and philanthropist Run Run Shaw (邵逸夫), the awards honour "individuals who are currently active in their respective fields and who have recently achieved distinguished and significant advances, who have made outstanding contributions in academic and scientific research or applications, or who in other domains have achieved excellence." The prize has been described as the "Nobel of the East".

== Award ==
The prize consists of three awards in the fields of astronomy, life science and medicine, and mathematical sciences; it is not awarded posthumously. Nominations are submitted by invited individuals beginning each year in September. Winners are announced in the summer and receive the award at a ceremony in early autumn. Each award consists of a gold medal, a certificate and USD$1.2 million (US$1 million before 2015). The front of the medal bears a portrait of Shaw and the name of the prize in English and Traditional Chinese characters; the back bears the year, category, laureate's name and a quotation from the Chinese philosopher Xunzi "制天命而用之" (translated to English as "Grasp the law of nature and make use of it").

As of 2022, there have been 99 Shaw Laureates. 16 Nobel laureates - Jules A. Hoffmann, Bruce Beutler, Saul Perlmutter, Adam Riess, Shinya Yamanaka, Robert Lefkowitz, Brian Schmidt, Jeffrey C. Hall, Michael Rosbash, Michael W. Young, Kip Thorne, Rainer Weiss, Jim Peebles, Michel Mayor, Reinhard Genzel, and David Julius - are Shaw Laureates. The inaugural laureate of the Shaw Prize in Astronomy was Jim Peebles, honored for his contributions to cosmology. Two inaugural prizes were awarded for the Shaw Prize in Life Science and Medicine: Stanley Norman Cohen, Herbert Boyer and Yuet Wai Kan jointly won one of them for their research in DNA while physiologist Richard Doll won the other for his contribution to cancer epidemiology. Shiing-Shen Chern was awarded the inaugural Shaw Prize in Mathematical Sciences for his work on differential geometry.

== Shaw Laureates ==
=== Astronomy ===
Year	Portrait	Laureate^{[a]}	Country^{[b]}	Rationale^{[c]}
2004		P. James E. Peebles	United States	For his groundbreaking contribution to cosmology. He laid the foundations for almost all modern investigations in cosmology, both theoretical and observational, transforming a highly speculative field into a precision science.
2005		Geoffrey Marcy	United States	For finding and characterizing the orbits and masses of the first planets around other stars, thereby revolutionizing our understanding of the processes that form planets and planetary systems.
2005		Michel Mayor	Switzerland	For finding and characterizing the orbits and masses of the first planets around other stars, thereby revolutionizing our understanding of the processes that form planets and planetary systems.
2006		Saul Perlmutter	United States	For discovering that the expansion rate of the universe is accelerating, implying in the simplest interpretation that the energy density of space is non-vanishing even in the absence of any matter and radiation.
2006		Adam Riess	United States	For discovering that the expansion rate of the universe is accelerating, implying in the simplest interpretation that the energy density of space is non-vanishing even in the absence of any matter and radiation.
2006		Brian Schmidt	Australia	For discovering that the expansion rate of the universe is accelerating, implying in the simplest interpretation that the energy density of space is non-vanishing even in the absence of any matter and radiation.
2007		Peter Goldreich	United States	In recognition of his lifetime achievements in theoretical astrophysics and planetary sciences.
2008		Reinhard Genzel	Germany	In recognition of his outstanding contributions in demonstrating that the Milky Way contains a supermassive black hole at its centre.
2009		Frank H. Shu (徐遐生)	United States	In recognition of his outstanding life-time contributions in theoretical astronomy.
2010		Charles L. Bennett	United States	For their leadership of the Wilkinson Microwave Anisotropy Probe (WMAP) experiment, which has enabled precise determinations of the fundamental cosmological parameters, including the geometry, age and composition of the universe.
2010		Lyman A. Page Jr.	United States	For their leadership of the Wilkinson Microwave Anisotropy Probe (WMAP) experiment, which has enabled precise determinations of the fundamental cosmological parameters, including the geometry, age and composition of the universe.
2010		David N. Spergel	United States	For their leadership of the Wilkinson Microwave Anisotropy Probe (WMAP) experiment, which has enabled precise determinations of the fundamental cosmological parameters, including the geometry, age and composition of the universe.
2011		Enrico Costa	Italy	For their leadership of space missions that enabled the demonstration of the cosmological origin of gamma ray bursts, the brightest sources known in the universe.
2011		Gerald J. Fishman	United States	For their leadership of space missions that enabled the demonstration of the cosmological origin of gamma ray bursts, the brightest sources known in the universe.
2012		David Jewitt	United States	For their discovery and characterization of trans-Neptunian bodies, an archeological treasure dating back to the formation of the Solar System and the long-sought source of short period comets.
2012		Jane Luu	United States	For their discovery and characterization of trans-Neptunian bodies, an archeological treasure dating back to the formation of the Solar System and the long-sought source of short period comets.
2013		Steven A. Balbus	United Kingdom	For their discovery and study of the magnetorotational instability, and for demonstrating that this instability leads to turbulence and is a viable mechanism for angular momentum transport in astrophysical accretion disks.
2013		John F. Hawley	United States	For their discovery and study of the magnetorotational instability, and for demonstrating that this instability leads to turbulence and is a viable mechanism for angular momentum transport in astrophysical accretion disks.
2014		Daniel Eisenstein	United States	For their contributions to the measurements of features in the large-scale structure of galaxies used to constrain the cosmological model including baryon acoustic oscillations and redshift-space distortions.
2014		Shaun Cole	United Kingdom	For their contributions to the measurements of features in the large-scale structure of galaxies used to constrain the cosmological model including baryon acoustic oscillations and redshift-space distortions.
2014		John A. Peacock	United Kingdom	For their contributions to the measurements of features in the large-scale structure of galaxies used to constrain the cosmological model including baryon acoustic oscillations and redshift-space distortions.
2015		William J. Borucki	United States	For his conceiving and leading the Kepler Mission, which greatly advanced knowledge of both extrasolar planetary systems and stellar interiors.
2016		Ronald W. P. Drever	United Kingdom	For conceiving and designing the Laser Interferometer Gravitational-Wave Observatory (LIGO), whose recent direct detection of gravitational waves opens a new window in astronomy, with the first remarkable discovery being the merger of a pair of stellar mass black holes.
2016		Kip S. Thorne	United States	For conceiving and designing the Laser Interferometer Gravitational-Wave Observatory (LIGO), whose recent direct detection of gravitational waves opens a new window in astronomy, with the first remarkable discovery being the merger of a pair of stellar mass black holes.
2016		Rainer Weiss	United States	For conceiving and designing the Laser Interferometer Gravitational-Wave Observatory (LIGO), whose recent direct detection of gravitational waves opens a new window in astronomy, with the first remarkable discovery being the merger of a pair of stellar mass black holes.
2017		Simon D. M. White	Germany	For his contributions to understanding structure formation in the Universe. With powerful numerical simulations he has shown how small density fluctuations in the early Universe develop into galaxies and other nonlinear structures, strongly supporting a cosmology with a flat geometry, and dominated by dark matter and a cosmological constant.
2018		Jean-Loup Puget	France	For his contributions to astronomy in the infrared to submillimetre spectral range. He detected the cosmic far-infrared background from past star-forming galaxies, and proposed aromatic hydrocarbon molecules as a constituent of interstellar matter. With the Planck space mission, he has dramatically advanced our knowledge of cosmology in the presence of interstellar matter foregrounds.
2019		Edward C. Stone	United States	For his leadership in the Voyager project, which has, over the past four decades, transformed our understanding of the four giant planets and the outer Solar System, and has now begun to explore interstellar space.
2020		Roger D. Blandford	United States	For his foundational contributions to theoretical astrophysics, especially concerning the fundamental understanding of active galactic nuclei, the formation and collimation of relativistic jets, the energy extraction mechanism from black holes, and the acceleration of particles in shocks and their relevant radiation mechanisms.
2021		Victoria M. Kaspi	Canada	For their contributions to our understanding of magnetars, a class of highly magnetized neutron stars that are linked to a wide range of spectacular, transient astrophysical phenomena. Through the development of new and precise observational techniques, they confirmed the existence of neutron stars with ultra-strong magnetic fields and characterized their physical properties. Their work has established magnetars as a new and important class of astrophysical objects.
2021		Chryssa Kouveliotou	United States	For their contributions to our understanding of magnetars, a class of highly magnetized neutron stars that are linked to a wide range of spectacular, transient astrophysical phenomena. Through the development of new and precise observational techniques, they confirmed the existence of neutron stars with ultra-strong magnetic fields and characterized their physical properties. Their work has established magnetars as a new and important class of astrophysical objects.
2022		Lennart Lindegren	Sweden	For their lifetime contributions to space astrometry, and in particular for their role in the conception and design of the European Space Agency's Hipparcos and Gaia missions.
2022		Michael Perryman	Ireland	For their lifetime contributions to space astrometry, and in particular for their role in the conception and design of the European Space Agency's Hipparcos and Gaia missions.
2023		Matthew Bailes	Australia	For the discovery of fast radio bursts (FRBs).
2023		Duncan Lorimer	United States	For the discovery of fast radio bursts (FRBs).
2023		Maura McLaughlin	United States	For the discovery of fast radio bursts (FRBs).
2024		Shrinivas R. Kulkarni	United States	For his ground-breaking discoveries about millisecond pulsars, gamma-ray bursts, supernovae, and other variable or transient astronomical objects
2025		John Richard Bond	Canada	For their pioneering research in cosmology, in particular for their studies of fluctuations in the cosmic microwave background. Their predictions have been verified by an armada of ground-, balloon- and space-based instruments, leading to precise determinations of the age, geometry, and mass-energy content of the universe.
2025		George Efstathiou	United Kingdom	For their pioneering research in cosmology, in particular for their studies of fluctuations in the cosmic microwave background. Their predictions have been verified by an armada of ground-, balloon- and space-based instruments, leading to precise determinations of the age, geometry, and mass-energy content of the universe.
2026		Ken'ichi Nomoto	Japan	For their studies of stellar explosions and the origin of the elements.
2026		Stanford Woosley	United States	For their studies of stellar explosions and the origin of the elements.

=== Life science and medicine ===
Year	Portrait	Laureate^{[a]}	Country^{[b]}	Rationale^{[c]}
2004^{[d]}		Stanley N. Cohen	United States	For their discoveries on DNA cloning and genetic engineering.
2004^{[d]}		Herbert W. Boyer	United States	For their discoveries on DNA cloning and genetic engineering.
2004^{[d]}		Yuet-Wai Kan	United States	For his discoveries on DNA polymorphism and its influence on human genetics.
2004^{[d]}		Richard Doll	United Kingdom	For his contribution to modern cancer epidemiology.
2005		Michael Berridge	United Kingdom	For his discoveries on calcium signalling in the regulation of cellular activity.
2006		Xiaodong Wang	United States	For his discovery of the biochemical basis of programmed cell death, a vital process that balances cell birth and defends against cancer.
2007		Robert Lefkowitz	United States	For his relentless elucidation of the major receptor system that mediates the response of cells and organs to drugs and hormones.
2008^{[e]}		Keith H. S. Campbell	United Kingdom	For their recent pivotal innovations in reversing the process of cell differentiation in mammals, a phenomenon which advances our knowledge of developmental biology and holds great promise for the treatment of human diseases and improvements in agriculture practices.
2008^{[e]}		Ian Wilmut	United Kingdom	For their recent pivotal innovations in reversing the process of cell differentiation in mammals, a phenomenon which advances our knowledge of developmental biology and holds great promise for the treatment of human diseases and improvements in agriculture practices.
2008^{[e]}		Shinya Yamanaka	Japan	For their recent pivotal innovations in reversing the process of cell differentiation in mammals, a phenomenon which advances our knowledge of developmental biology and holds great promise for the treatment of human diseases and improvements in agriculture practices.
2009		Douglas L. Coleman	United States	For their work leading to the discovery of leptin, a hormone that regulates food intake and body weight.
2009		Jeffrey M. Friedman	United States	For their work leading to the discovery of leptin, a hormone that regulates food intake and body weight.
2010		David Julius	United States	For his seminal discoveries of molecular mechanisms by which the skin senses painful stimuli and temperature and produces pain hypersensitivity.
2011		Jules A. Hoffmann	France	For their discovery of the molecular mechanism of innate immunity, the first line of defense against pathogens.
2011		Ruslan M. Medzhitov	United States	For their discovery of the molecular mechanism of innate immunity, the first line of defense against pathogens.
2011		Bruce A. Beutler	United States	For their discovery of the molecular mechanism of innate immunity, the first line of defense against pathogens.
2012		Franz-Ulrich Hartl	Germany	For their contributions to the understanding of the molecular mechanism of protein folding. Proper protein folding is essential for many cellular functions.
2012		Arthur L. Horwich	United States	For their contributions to the understanding of the molecular mechanism of protein folding. Proper protein folding is essential for many cellular functions.
2013		Jeffrey C. Hall	United States	For their discovery of molecular mechanisms underlying circadian rhythms.
2013		Michael Rosbash	United States	For their discovery of molecular mechanisms underlying circadian rhythms.
2013		Michael W. Young	United States	For their discovery of molecular mechanisms underlying circadian rhythms.
2014		Kazutoshi Mori	Japan	For their discovery of the Unfolded Protein Response of the endoplasmic reticulum, a cell signalling pathway that controls organelle homeostasis and quality of protein export in eukaryotic cells.
2014		Peter Walter	United States	For their discovery of the Unfolded Protein Response of the endoplasmic reticulum, a cell signalling pathway that controls organelle homeostasis and quality of protein export in eukaryotic cells.
2015		Bonnie L. Bassler	United States	For elucidating the molecular mechanism of quorum sensing, a process whereby bacteria communicate with each other and which offers innovative ways to interfere with bacterial pathogens or to modulate the microbiome for health applications.
2015		E. Peter Greenberg	United States	For elucidating the molecular mechanism of quorum sensing, a process whereby bacteria communicate with each other and which offers innovative ways to interfere with bacterial pathogens or to modulate the microbiome for health applications.
2016		Adrian P. Bird	United Kingdom	For their discovery of the genes and the encoded proteins that recognize one chemical modification of the DNA of chromosomes that influences gene control as the basis of the developmental disorder Rett syndrome.
2016		Huda Y. Zoghbi	United States	For their discovery of the genes and the encoded proteins that recognize one chemical modification of the DNA of chromosomes that influences gene control as the basis of the developmental disorder Rett syndrome.
2017		Ian R. Gibbons	United States	For their discovery of microtubule-associated motor proteins: engines that power cellular and intracellular movements essential to the growth, division, and survival of human cells.
2017		Ronald D. Vale	United States	For their discovery of microtubule-associated motor proteins: engines that power cellular and intracellular movements essential to the growth, division, and survival of human cells.
2018		Mary-Claire King	United States	For her mapping the first breast cancer gene. Using mathematical modeling, King predicted and then demonstrated that breast cancer can be caused by a single gene. She mapped the gene which facilitated its cloning and has saved thousands of lives.
2019		Maria Jasin	United States	For her work showing that localized double strand breaks in DNA stimulate recombination in mammalian cells. This seminal work was essential for and led directly to the tools enabling editing at specific sites in mammalian genomes.
2020		Gero Miesenböck	Austria	For the development of optogenetics, a technology that has revolutionized neuroscience.
2020		Peter Hegemann	Germany	For the development of optogenetics, a technology that has revolutionized neuroscience.
2020		Georg Nagel	Germany	For the development of optogenetics, a technology that has revolutionized neuroscience.
2021		Scott D. Emr	United States	For the landmark discovery of the ESCRT (Endosomal Sorting Complex Required for Transport) pathway, which is essential in diverse processes involving membrane biology, including cell division, cell-surface receptor regulation, viral dissemination, and nerve axon pruning. These processes are central to life, health and disease.
2022		Paul A. Negulescu	United States	For landmark discoveries of the molecular, biochemical, and functional defects underlying cystic fibrosis and the identification and development of medicines that reverse those defects and can treat most people affected by this disorder. Together, these discoveries and medicines are alleviating human suffering and saving lives.
2022		Michael J. Welsh	United States	For landmark discoveries of the molecular, biochemical, and functional defects underlying cystic fibrosis and the identification and development of medicines that reverse those defects and can treat most people affected by this disorder. Together, these discoveries and medicines are alleviating human suffering and saving lives.
2023		Patrick Cramer	Germany	For pioneering structural biology that enabled visualisation, at the level of individual atoms, of the protein machines responsible for gene transcription, one of life's fundamental processes. They revealed the mechanism underlying each step in gene transcription, how proper gene transcription promotes health, and how dysregulation causes disease.
2023		Eva Nogales	Spain & United States	For pioneering structural biology that enabled visualisation, at the level of individual atoms, of the protein machines responsible for gene transcription, one of life's fundamental processes. They revealed the mechanism underlying each step in gene transcription, how proper gene transcription promotes health, and how dysregulation causes disease.
2024		Stuart H. Orkin	United States	For their discovery of the genetic and molecular mechanisms underlying the fetal-to-adult hemoglobin switch, making possible a revolutionary and highly effective genome-editing therapy for sickle cell anemia and β thalassemia, devastating blood diseases that affect millions of people worldwide.
2024		Swee Lay Thein	United States	For their discovery of the genetic and molecular mechanisms underlying the fetal-to-adult hemoglobin switch, making possible a revolutionary and highly effective genome-editing therapy for sickle cell anemia and β thalassemia, devastating blood diseases that affect millions of people worldwide.
2025		Wolfgang Baumeister	Germany	For his pioneering development and use of cryogenic-electron tomography (cryo-ET), an imaging technique that enables three-dimensional visualisation of biological samples, including proteins, macromolecular complexes, and cellular compartments as they exist in their natural cellular settings.
2026		Anne Dejean	France	For the discovery of the molecular and cellular bases of acute promyelocytic leukemia and the pioneering of a synergistic targeted therapy that transformed the disease from one of the most deadly to one of the most curable cancers.
2026		Hugues de Thé	France	For the discovery of the molecular and cellular bases of acute promyelocytic leukemia and the pioneering of a synergistic targeted therapy that transformed the disease from one of the most deadly to one of the most curable cancers.
2026		Chen Zhu	China	For the discovery of the molecular and cellular bases of acute promyelocytic leukemia and the pioneering of a synergistic targeted therapy that transformed the disease from one of the most deadly to one of the most curable cancers.

=== Mathematical sciences ===
Year	Portrait	Laureate^{[a]}	Country^{[b]}	Rationale^{[c]}
2004		Shiing-Shen Chern (陳省身)	China	For his initiation of the field of global differential geometry and his continued leadership of the field, resulting in beautiful developments that are at the centre of contemporary mathematics, with deep connections to topology, algebra and analysis, in short, to all major branches of mathematics of the last sixty years.
2005		Andrew John Wiles	United Kingdom	For his proof of Fermat's Last Theorem.
2006		David Mumford	United States	For David Mumford's contributions to mathematics, and to the new interdisciplinary fields of pattern theory and vision research; and for Wentsun Wu's contributions to the new interdisciplinary field of mathematics mechanization.
2006		Wentsun Wu (吳文俊)	China	For David Mumford's contributions to mathematics, and to the new interdisciplinary fields of pattern theory and vision research; and for Wentsun Wu's contributions to the new interdisciplinary field of mathematics mechanization.
2007		Robert Langlands	Canada	For initiating and developing a grand unifying vision of mathematics that connects prime numbers with symmetry.
2007		Richard Taylor	United Kingdom	For initiating and developing a grand unifying vision of mathematics that connects prime numbers with symmetry.
2008		Vladimir Arnold	Russia	For their widespread and influential contributions to Mathematical Physics.
2008		Ludwig Faddeev	Russia	For their widespread and influential contributions to Mathematical Physics.
2009		Simon K. Donaldson	United Kingdom	For their many brilliant contributions to geometry in 3 and 4 dimensions.
2009		Clifford H. Taubes	United States	For their many brilliant contributions to geometry in 3 and 4 dimensions.
2010		Jean Bourgain	Belgium	For his profound work in mathematical analysis and its application to partial differential equations, mathematical physics, combinatorics, number theory, ergodic theory and theoretical computer science.
2011		Demetrios Christodoulou	Switzerland	For their highly innovative works on nonlinear partial differential equations in Lorentzian and Riemannian geometry and their applications to general relativity and topology.
2011		Richard S. Hamilton	United States	For their highly innovative works on nonlinear partial differential equations in Lorentzian and Riemannian geometry and their applications to general relativity and topology.
2012		Maxim Kontsevich	France	For his pioneering works in algebra, geometry and mathematical physics and in particular deformation quantization, motivic integration and mirror symmetry.
2013		David L. Donoho	United States	For his profound contributions to modern mathematical statistics and in particular the development of optimal algorithms for statistical estimation in the presence of noise and of efficient techniques for sparse representation and recovery in large data-sets.
2014		George Lusztig	United States	For his fundamental contributions to algebra, algebraic geometry, and representation theory, and for weaving these subjects together to solve old problems and reveal beautiful new connections.
2015		Gerd Faltings	Germany	For their introduction and development of fundamental tools in number theory, allowing them as well as others to resolve some longstanding classical problems.
2015		Henryk Iwaniec	United States	For their introduction and development of fundamental tools in number theory, allowing them as well as others to resolve some longstanding classical problems.
2016		Nigel J. Hitchin	United Kingdom	For his far-reaching contributions to geometry, representation theory and theoretical physics. The fundamental and elegant concepts and techniques that he has introduced have had wide impact and are of lasting importance.
2017		János Kollár	Hungary	For their remarkable results in many central areas of algebraic geometry, which have transformed the field and led to the solution of long-standing problems that had appeared out of reach.
2017		Claire Voisin	France	For their remarkable results in many central areas of algebraic geometry, which have transformed the field and led to the solution of long-standing problems that had appeared out of reach.
2018		Luis A. Caffarelli	Argentina	For his groundbreaking work on partial differential equations, including creating a theory of regularity for nonlinear equations such as the Monge-Ampère equation, and free-boundary problems such as the obstacle problem, work that has influenced a whole generation of researchers in the field.
2019		Michel Talagrand	France	For his work on concentration inequalities, on suprema of stochastic processes and on rigorous results for spin glasses.
2020		Alexander Beilinson	United States	For their huge influence on and profound contributions to representation theory, as well as many other areas of mathematics.
2020		David Kazhdan	Israel	For their huge influence on and profound contributions to representation theory, as well as many other areas of mathematics.
2021		Jean-Michel Bismut	France	For their remarkable insights that have transformed, and continue to transform, modern geometry.
2021		Jeff Cheeger	United States	For their remarkable insights that have transformed, and continue to transform, modern geometry.
2022		Noga Alon	Israel	For their remarkable contributions to discrete mathematics and model theory with interaction notably with algebraic geometry, topology and computer sciences.
2022		Ehud Hrushovski	Israel	For their remarkable contributions to discrete mathematics and model theory with interaction notably with algebraic geometry, topology and computer sciences.
2023		Vladimir Drinfeld	United States	For their contributions related to mathematical physics, to arithmetic geometry, to differential geometry and to Kähler geometry.
2023		Shing-Tung Yau	United States	For their contributions related to mathematical physics, to arithmetic geometry, to differential geometry and to Kähler geometry.
2024		Peter Sarnak	United States	For his development of the arithmetic theory of thin groups and the affine sieve, by bringing together number theory, analysis, combinatorics, dynamics, geometry and spectral theory.
2025		Kenji Fukaya	Japan	For his pioneering work on symplectic geometry, especially for envisioning the existence of a category — nowadays called the Fukaya category — consisting of Lagrangians on a symplectic manifold, for leading the monumental task of constructing it, and for his subsequent ground-breaking and impactful contributions to symplectic topology, mirror symmetry, and gauge theory.
2026		Emmanuel Candès	France	For their breakthrough contributions to the use of deep techniques from mathematical analysis to rigorously understand applied problems in information theory, signal processing and statistics on the one hand, and to the study of singularities in geometric measure theory and fluid dynamics on the other.
2026		Camillo De Lellis	Italy	For their breakthrough contributions to the use of deep techniques from mathematical analysis to rigorously understand applied problems in information theory, signal processing and statistics on the one hand, and to the study of singularities in geometric measure theory and fluid dynamics on the other.

== See also ==
- List of general science and technology awards
- List of astronomy awards
- List of mathematics awards
- List of medicine awards
- List of physics awards

== Notes ==
- ^{a} The form and spelling of the names according to the Shaw Prize Foundation.
- ^{b} Sites of the work places of the Laureates at the time of the award.
- ^{c} The rationale from the Shaw Prize Foundation.
- ^{d} Two prizes were awarded for the life science and medicine category in 2004: Stanley N. Cohen, Herbert W. Boyer and Yuet-Wai Kan jointly received one of the prizes (half went to Cohen and Boyer; the other half went to Kan). Richard Doll received the other prize.
- ^{e} Half of the 2008 life science and medicine prize went to Keith H. S. Campbell and Ian Wilmut; the other half went to Shinya Yamanaka.
