= Stefano Vitale =

Italian physicist (born 1951)

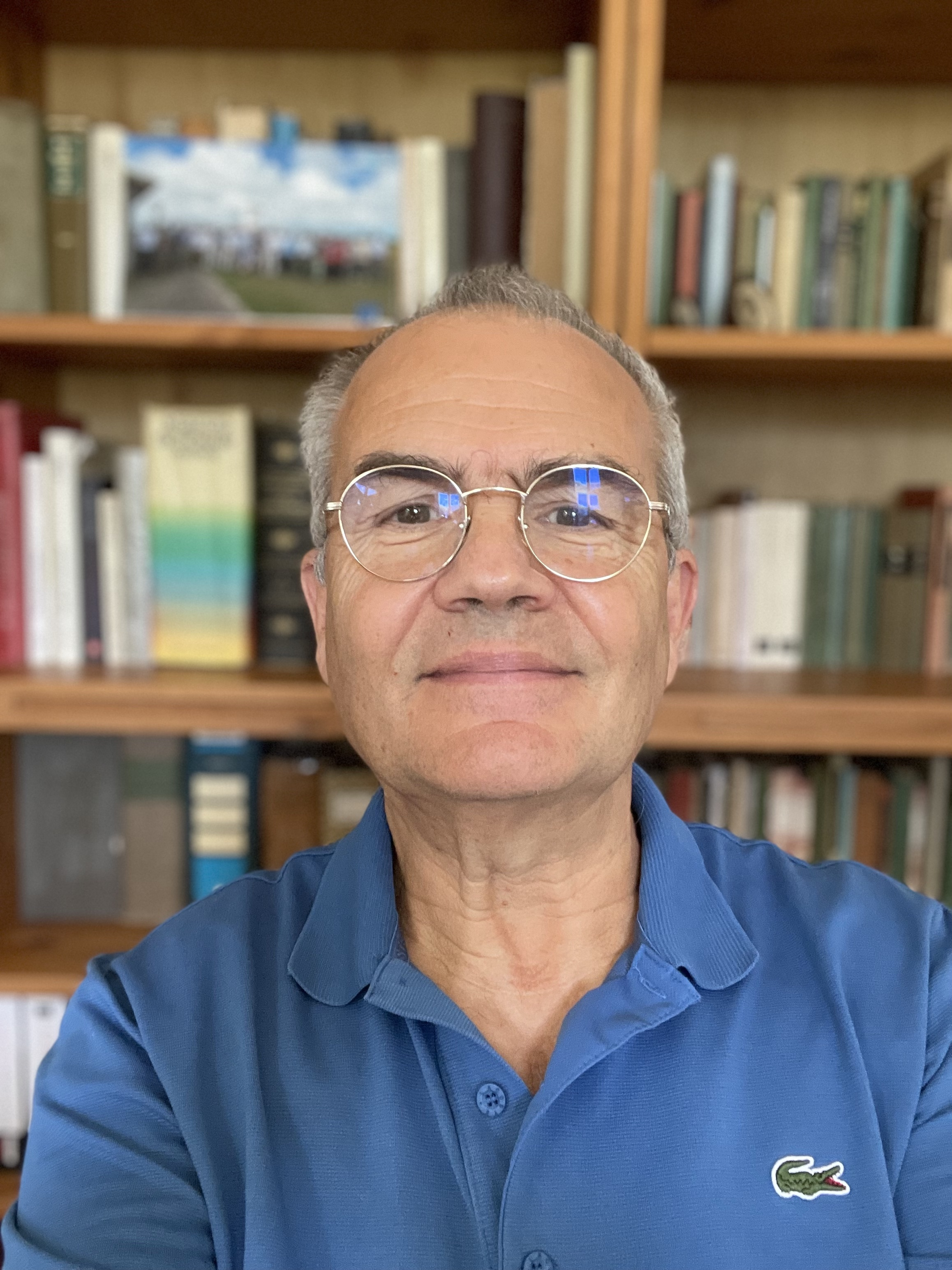
- Vitale in 2022
- Born: 1951 (age 74–75); Naples, Italy
- Education: University of Rome (Università degli Studi di Roma "La Sapienza")
- Awards: Asteroid N 19331 named "Stefanovitale" (2016), ESA Corporate Team Achievement Award (with the LISA Pathfinder team) (2017), Space Technology Award of the American Astronautical Society (2017), Amaldi Medal (2018), Tycho Brahe Medal (2020)
- Scientific career
- Fields: Condensed Matter Physics, Experimental Gravitation, Gravitational Wave Research
- Workplaces: University of Rome (Università degli Studi di Roma "La Sapienza"), University of Trento (Università degli Studi di Trento), University of California at Berkeley and Stanford University in California, Istituto Nazionale di Fisica Nucleare (INFN), European space agency (ESA)
- Website: https://webapps.unitn.it/du/en/Persona/PER0000345/Didattica

Stefano Vitale (born 1951, Naples, Italy) is an Italian physicist and a retired professor of experimental physics at the University of Trento. He is known for his scientific contributions in the field of gravitational wave (GW) research and the successful management of international scientific projects.

In particular he has been the co-Principal Investigator of the cryogenic, resonant-bar GW detector AURIGA and the Principal Investigator of the LISA Technology Package, the sole instrument of ESA´s LISA Pathfinder mission. He continues to do scientific research and is Co-lead of the international LISA Consortium. LISA, the Laser Interferometer Space Antenna, is the future gravitational wave-observatory in space, led by ESA.

Vitale has served on many different committees. In particular he has been the chair of the Fundamental Physics Advisory group of Science Directorate of ESA, and the chair of ESA's Science Programme Committee, the delegate body that steers the mandatory agency science program.

== Career ==
Vitale received his Laurea in Physics at the University of Rome (now Università degli Studi di Roma "La Sapienza") in 1976 and was a research fellow at the University of Trento from 1977 to 1979. From 1980 to 1985 he was appointed Assistant Professor for Condensed matter physics at University of Trento, after which he became Associate Professor of Physics there. Since 1994 he was full Professor of Physics at the University of Trento and served 2001 to 2004 also as Deputy Rector (Prorettore Vicario). He retired from his Professorship on 30 September 2021.

In 1992, Vitale was visiting professor at the Department of Physics at the University of California at Berkeley and from 1997 to 1998 he also was Visiting Scholar at the University of California at Berkeley and Stanford University in California. Since 1985, Vitale is a research associate at the Istituto Nazionale di Fisica Nucleare (INFN).

During his career, Vitale served on many national and international academic bodies, managing scientific projects and communities and advocating for basic and applied research.

== Experimental gravitational wave research ==
Vitale got involved in experimental gravitational wave research in the late 1980s. From 1988 to 2001 and then again from 2005 until his retirement in 2021, he was Head of the Laboratory for Experimental Gravitation at the Department of Physics of the University of Trento where cutting edge technologies for gravitational wave observatories were developed and tested.

From 1989 to 2003 Vitale was the co-Principal Investigator of the cryogenic, resonant-bar GW detector AURIGA, by the Italian Istituto Nazionale di Fisica Nucleare, based in Legnaro. AURIGA has been the most sensitive of this kind of detectors, with the adoption of a three resonant mode configuration the design of which was led by Vitale.

=== The LISA Pathfinder and LISA missions ===
In 2003 Vitale became the Principal Investigator of the LISA Technology Package, the sole instrument of the LISA Pathfinder mission of the European Space Agency. LISA Pathfinder was the precursor to the space-based GW detector LISA (Laser Interferometer Space Antenna), under development by ESA and NASA. LISA Pathfinder operated between 2015 and 2017, and successfully demonstrated the viability of the planned LISA Mission. Vitale led the design of the gravity reference sensor and the overall design of the experiment. LISA Pathfinder was decommissioned in July 2017 and the post of Principal Investigator duly expired in 2018.

Vitale is a member of the core international scientific team behind LISA, serving both within international scientific team for several years and on the executive committee of the LISA consortium. From 2016 to 2017 he was Co-Principal Investigator of LISA and since 2020 he is Co-Lead of the LISA Consortium. The LISA Consortium is a large international collaboration that combines the resources and expertise from scientists in many countries all over the world. Together with ESA and NASA, the LISA Consortium is working to bring the LISA Mission to fruition.

== Awards and honours ==
- Asteroid N 19331, of IAU Catalogue of Minor Planets, has been named Stefanovitale (2016)
- As a member of LISA Pathfinder team, the ESA Corporate Team Achievement Award (2017)
- As a member of LISA Pathfinder team, the 2017 Space Technology Award of the American Astronautical Society
- Amaldi Medal (European Prize for Gravitation of the Italian Gravitation Society) (2018)
- Tycho Brahe Medal of the European Astronomical Society (2020)

== Science outreach publications ==
- Dalle onde ai buchi neri. Stefano Vitale, Le Scienze, (Italian edition of Scientific American) March 2004 (In Italian)
- Timing Gravity. Stefano Vitale, Christophe Salomon and Wolfgang Ertmer in Looking up: Europe's quiet revolution in microgravity research Scientific American 2008 (In English. Also translated to German)
- Dal big bang ai buchi neri. Paolo De Bernardis and Stefano Vitale, Le Scienze October 2009 (In Italian)
- La colonna sonora dell'universo. Bernard Schutz e Stefano Vitale, Le Scienze May 2011, (In Italian. Translated to French for Pour la Science November 2011)
