= Raymond Wilson (physicist) =

English physicist (1928–2018)

Raymond Neil Wilson (23 March 1928 – 16 March 2018) was an English physicist and telescope optics designer, best known for pioneering the use of active optics in large telescopes.

== Biography ==
Wilson's first degree was in physics from the University of Birmingham, followed by studying engineering at Imperial College London. After completing national service in 1952, he resumed his work on optics. He then worked at Imperial College and at the National Physical Laboratory in the UK. From around 1961, he spent 11 years as Head of the Design Department for telescopes at Carl Zeiss AG in Oberkochen, Germany.

In 1972 he became Head of the Optics and Telescopes Group at the European Southern Observatory (ESO), where he worked for the next 21 years, first in Geneva and then in Garching, Germany. His major contributions have been in telescope optics and technology. In particular, he developed the concept of active optics, which is now the basic principle on which modern large telescopes are constructed. The concept of active optics was developed first in ESO's New Technology Telescope (first light 1988), and then in ESO's Very Large Telescope (VLT). (first light 1998).

Wilson retired in 1993, writing a two-volume monograph Reflecting Telescope Optics, a leading work in the field. He also extended the design of large telescopes to the next-generation designs that use three, four, and five mirrors.

Wilson's other interests included history, economics, cosmology and biology.

== Awards and honors ==
The awards bestowed for his work include the Karl Schwarzschild Medal (1993) and a share of the Kavli Prize (2010), as well as the Tycho Brahe Prize (2010). He has also been made Chevalier of the French Legion of Honour (2003) and has received the Prix Lallemand (2005) from the French Academy of Sciences. He was a fellow of the Norwegian Academy of Science and Letters.

On his retirement in September 1993, the Themistian asteroid 3790 Raywilson was named in his honor. The name was proposed by Lutz Schmadel and endorsed by the Heidelberg Observatory, where the asteroid had been discovered by Karl Reinmuth 56 years earlier.
