= John F. Hawley =

American astrophysicist (1958–2021)

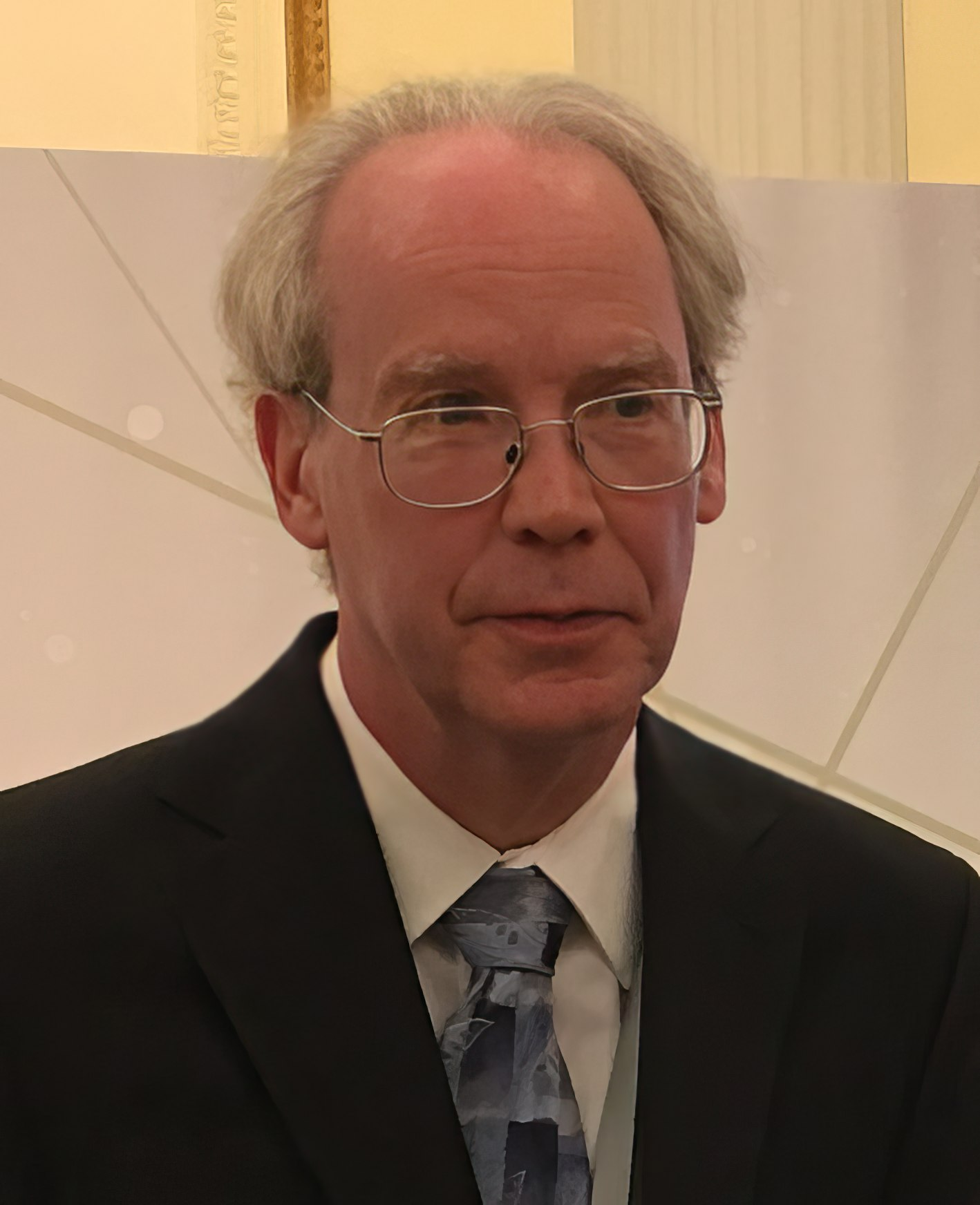
- Hawley in 2019
- Born: August 23, 1958; Annapolis, Maryland, U.S.
- Died: December 12, 2021 (aged 63)
- Education: Haverford College; University of Illinois Urbana-Champaign
- Known for: Magnetorotational instability
- Spouse: Katherine Holcomb
- Relatives: Steven A. Hawley
- Awards: Shaw Prize; Warner Prize
- Scientific career
- Workplaces: California Institute of Technology; University of Virginia
- Thesis: A numerical study of nonspherical black hole accretion (1985)
- Doctoral advisor: Larry Smarr

John Frederick Hawley (August 23, 1958 – December 12, 2021) was an American astrophysicist and a professor of astronomy at the University of Virginia. In 2013, he shared the Shaw Prize for Astronomy with Steven Balbus.

== Early life ==
John Hawley was born in 1958 in Annapolis, Maryland. He was the younger brother of former astronaut Steven A. Hawley. The family moved to Salina, Kansas when he was young. He graduated from Salina Central High School in 1976.

Hawley was a 1980 graduate of Haverford College. He received his Ph.D. in astronomy from the University of Illinois at Urbana–Champaign in 1984 under the supervision of Larry Smarr.

== Professional career ==
Hawley was a Bantrell Prize Fellow in Theoretical Astrophysics at the California Institute of Technology from 1984 to 1987. He then joined the faculty of the University of Virginia in 1987 as an assistant professor. He was promoted to full professor in 1999 and served as chair of the Department of Astronomy from 2006 to 2012. In 2012 Hawley was appointed Associate Dean for the Sciences in the College and Graduate School of Arts and Sciences.

His research interests included computational astrophysics and accretion disks. He and his early collaborators pioneered numerical techniques for accretion flows and in the creation of graphics and animations to communicate their results.

== Recognition ==
Hawley was the 1993 recipient of the Helen B. Warner Prize for Astronomy of the American Astronomical Society. In 2013, he and former colleague Steven Balbus shared the Shaw Prize in Astronomy for their work on the magnetorotational instability (MRI). Considered one of the highest honors in astronomy, the prize included a US$1 million cash award. According to the Shaw selection committee the "discovery and elucidation of the magnetorotational instability (MRI)" solved the previously "elusive" problem of accretion, a widespread phenomenon in astrophysics and "provides what to this day remains the only viable mechanism for the outward transfer of angular momentum in accretion disks". The Shaw Prize ceremony was held September 23 in Hong Kong.

When Hawley learned of the Shaw Prize via email, he thought it was a scam. "I started looking for the Nigerian return address and a request for my bank account number," he later joked. He also recalled watching late-night kung fu movies made by Run Run Shaw, the prize's founder, and joked that now he would have to buy a good tuxedo rather than wear "the usual astronomer attire – blue jeans and sneakers." On the prize money, he commented "We're just selfless scientists who live for the joy of discovery, but it's nice to get some cash, too."
