= Tycho Brahe Medal =

Astronomy award

- Awarded for: In recognition of the development or exploitation of European instruments, or major discoveries based largely on such instruments.
- Country: Europe
- Presented by: European Astronomical Society
- First award: 2008
- Website: eas.unige.ch/tycho_brahe_medal.jsp

The Tycho Brahe Medal is awarded by the European Astronomical Society. Namesake is the Danish astronomer of the Renaissance Tycho Brahe. Inaugurated in 2008, the prize is awarded annually in recognition of the pioneering of European astronomical instrumentations, or major discoveries based largely on such instruments. Since 2019, a medal has been awarded.

== Laureates ==
The following persons have received the Tycho Brahe Prize/Medal:

Year	Name
2008	Göran Scharmer
2009	Françoise Combes
2010	Raymond Wilson
2011	Michael Perryman
2012	Reinhard Genzel
2013	Massimo Tarenghi
2014	Antoine Labeyrie
2015	Michel Mayor
2016	Joachim Trümper
2017	Bernard Delabre
2018	Andrzej Udalski
2019	Guy Monnet
2020	Stefano Vitale
2021	Frank Eisenhauer
2022	Jean-Luc Starck
2023	Anton Zensus
2024	Francesco Pepe
2025	Karl-Friedrich Schuster
2026	Gillian Wright

== See also ==
- List of astronomy awards
- Prizes named after people
