= 3790 Raywilson =

Main-belt asteroid

Discovery
- Discovered by: K. Reinmuth
- Discovery site: Heidelberg Obs.
- Discovery date: 26 October 1937

Designations
- Named after: Raymond Wilson (English physicist)
- Alternative designations: 1937 UE · 1976 SV_{1} 1982 UC_{2}
- Minor planet category: main-belt · (outer); Themis

Orbital characteristics
- Epoch 23 March 2018 (JD 2458200.5)
- Uncertainty parameter 0
- Observation arc: 80.42 yr (29,372 d)
- Aphelion: 3.6936 AU
- Perihelion: 2.6347 AU
- Semi-major axis: 3.1642 AU
- Eccentricity: 0.1673
- Orbital period (sidereal): 5.63 yr (2,056 d)
- Mean anomaly: 102.45°
- Mean motion: 0° 10^{m} 30.36^{s} / day
- Inclination: 0.4756°
- Longitude of ascending node: 320.35°
- Argument of perihelion: 96.123°

Physical characteristics
- Mean diameter: 10.35±2.87 km 12.94 km (calculated); 14.028±0.229 km
- Synodic rotation period: 4.654±0.0007 h 4.86 h
- Geometric albedo: 0.052±0.020; 0.08 (assumed); 0.137±0.130
- Spectral type: C
- Absolute magnitude (H): 12.70; 12.770±0.003 (R); 12.8; 13.00±0.18

3790 Raywilson, provisional designation 1937 UE, is a carbonaceous Themistian asteroid from the outer regions of the asteroid belt, approximately 12 kilometers (7.5 miles) in diameter. It was discovered on 26 October 1937, by astronomer Karl Reinmuth at the Heidelberg-Königstuhl State Observatory in Heidelberg, Germany. The C-type asteroid has a rotation period of 4.65 hours. It was named for English physicist Raymond Wilson.

== Orbit and classification ==
Raywilson is a Themistian asteroid that belongs to the Themis family (602), a very large family of carbonaceous asteroids, named after its parent body, 24 Themis. For no good reason, it has also been considered a member of the Eos family.

It orbits the Sun in the outer asteroid belt at a distance of 2.6–3.7 AU once every 5 years and 8 months (2,056 days; semi-major axis of 3.16 AU). Its orbit has an eccentricity of 0.17 and an inclination of 0° with respect to the ecliptic. The body's observation arc begins at Heidelberg, the night after its official discovery observation.

== Physical characteristics ==
Pan-STARRS' photometric survey has characterized it as a common, carbonaceous C-type asteroid, which is also the overall spectral type of the Themis family.

=== Rotation period ===
In October 2010, a rotational lightcurve of Raywilson was obtained in the R-band from photometric observations by astronomers at the Palomar Transient Factory in California. Lightcurve analysis gave a rotation period of 4.654 hours with a brightness variation of 0.30 magnitude (U=2). A previous measurement by Brazilian astronomers gave a period of 4.86 hours and an amplitude of 0.31 magnitude (U=1).

=== Diameter and albedo ===
According to the survey carried out by the NEOWISE mission of NASA's Wide-field Infrared Survey Explorer, Raywilson measures between 10.35 and 14.028 kilometers in diameter and its surface has an albedo between 0.052 and 0.137, while the Collaborative Asteroid Lightcurve Link assumes an albedo of 0.08 and calculates a diameter of 12.94 kilometers based on an absolute magnitude of 12.8.

== Naming ==
This minor planet was named after English physicist Raymond Wilson (1928–2018), who was an astronomical optician and pioneer of active optics at ESO's La Silla Observatory in the 1970s. The official naming citation was proposed by Lutz Schmadel, endorsed by the Heidelberg Observatory, and published by the Minor Planet Center on 1 September 1993 (M.P.C. 22499).
