= Yuet Wai Kan =

Chinese-American geneticist and hematologist

Yuet Wai Kan FRS, Member (NAS), Founding Member (ASHK)
- 簡悅威
- Born: June 11, 1936 (age 90); British Hong Kong
- Education: University of Hong Kong (MBBS)
- Known for: Research of single-nucleotide polymorphism Prenatal testing of blood disease
- Spouse: Alvera Limauro Kan
- Children: 2
- Awards: William Allan Award; Canada Gairdner International Award; Albert Lasker Clinical Medical Research Award; Shaw Prize in Life Science & Medicine
- Scientific career
- Fields: Human genetics Hematology
- Workplaces: Peter Bent Brigham Hospital; University of Pittsburgh; Massachusetts Institute of Technology; McGill University; University of Pennsylvania; Boston Children's Hospital; Harvard University; San Francisco General Hospital; Howard Hughes Medical Institute; University of California, San Francisco
Yuet Wai Kan
- Traditional Chinese: 簡悅威
- Simplified Chinese: 简悦威
Transcriptions
Yue: Cantonese
- Yale Romanization: Gáan Yuht Wāi
- Jyutping: Gaan^{2} Jyut^{6} Wai^{1}

Yuet Wai Kan FRS (Chinese: 簡悅威; Jyutping: Gaan2 Jyut6 Wai1; born June 11, 1936), is a Chinese-American geneticist and hematologist. He is the current Louis K. Diamond Chair in Hematology and a Professor Emeritus at the University of California, San Francisco. He is a former president of the American Society of Hematology.

== Early life and education ==
Kan is of Shunde, Guangdong, descent, and was born in Hong Kong to the prominent Kan family. His father, Tong Po Kan, was a co-founder of Bank of East Asia, and had 14 children; Kan is the youngest. Kan's brother, Yuet-keung Kan, was the Senior Unofficial Member of the Legislative Council of Hong Kong and the Executive Council of Hong Kong, and a former chairman of the Bank of East Asia.

Kan started his education at True Light Elementary School, not long before the Japanese occupation of Hong Kong during World War II. He entered Wah Yan College, Hong Kong after the war and graduated in 1952. He then followed his father's wish and studied medicine in the University of Hong Kong (HKU), staying at the residence of Morrison Hall and obtaining his Bachelor of Medicine, Bachelor of Surgery degree in 1958, with a distinction in Social Medicine, Medicine, Surgery and Obstetrics and Gynecology.

The University of Hong Kong awarded Kan a Doctor of Science in 1980.

== Career ==
After spending two years at Queen Mary Hospital for residency and internship, at the advice of David Todd, a professor at the HKU Department of Medicine, Kan went to the United States in 1960 to work and be trained in various North American institutions. He first went to Peter Bent Brigham Hospital in Boston (now part of Brigham and Women's Hospital) to work and learn hematology under Frank H. Gardner, during which he became interested in research. He then moved to the University of Pittsburgh to finish his clinical training and residency under Jack Myers, and then joined Vernon Ingram at the Massachusetts Institute of Technology to learn about hemoglobin. Kan then joined Royal Victoria Hospital at McGill University in Montreal as a fellow in hematology under Louis Lowenstein. He became interested in thalassemia after attending to an infant with alpha-thalassemia.

After the fellowship, Kan briefly teamed up with Frank H. Gardner again at the University of Pennsylvania, to which Gardner recently moved. He moved again in 1970, when a former colleague of his at Peter Bent Brigham Hospital invited him to study thalassemia at Boston Children's Hospital, and became an assistant professor at Harvard University. In 1972, Kan went to San Francisco General Hospital to become the Chief of Hematology Service, and was, at the same time, appointed an associate professor at the University of California, San Francisco (UCSF). In 1976, he became an Investigator at the Howard Hughes Medical Institute, a position from which he retired in 2003. Kan was promoted to full professor in 1977 at the Department of Medicine of UCSF, and was cross-appointed to the Department of Biochemistry and Biophysics in 1979. In 1983, he was appointed head of the Division of Genetics and Molecular Hematology at the Department of Medicine, and became the Louis K. Diamond Chair in Hematology.

Kan sat on the President's Committee on the National Medal of Science, which reviews nominations for the award, from 1988 to 1990, and was the president of the American Society of Hematology in 1990. He was also the president of the Society of Chinese Bioscientists in America from 1998 to 1999, and was the chairman of the board of trustees of the Croucher Foundation, Hong Kong, from 1991 to 2011.

In 1993, Kan was appointed to head the newly established Gene Therapy Core Center at UCSF.

Kan has also served on the Committee on Human Rights of the National Academy of Sciences, National Academy of Engineering, and Institute of Medicine (now National Academy of Medicine) from 2000 until at least 2008, and was the director of the Institute of Molecular Biology at the University of Hong Kong from 1990 to 1994, which was dissolved in 2005.

Since 1994, Kan has been an advisor at the Hong Kong-based Qiu Shi Science and Technologies Foundation, which supports science in China.

== Research ==
Kan is best known for his research in the etiology of thalassemia, and has significant contribution to the prenatal testing of hemoglobinopathy and the research in single-nucleotide polymorphisms (SNPs).

Kan and his collaborators found the deletion of a gene was the cause of alpha-thalassemia, the first demonstration of its kind for any disease. He was also the first to establish that a single DNA mutation could lead to a human disease, and the first to diagnose a human disease using DNA. His 1979 report on the cause of beta-thalassemia established the disease-causing ability of SNPs, where he found that a nonsense mutation, a type of point mutation, led to the truncation of the beta chains of hemoglobin.

In prenatal testing research, he discovered, in 1972, that hemoglobin protein chains could be isolated from fetal blood, and the presence of abnormal hemoglobin chains signified sickle cell disease, allowing for the detection of the disease before birth. Then, building on his finding that alpha-thalassemia was caused by a gene deletion, he designed a DNA-based test for the deletion, the first time a DNA test was used for diagnosing a human condition. In 1978, he discovered a SNP next to the HBB gene that is associated with the HBB mutation that causes sickle cell disease. Digesting this DNA sequence with special enzymes (known as restriction enzymes) yielded specific DNA fragments, the sets of which varied according to the SNP variation and, by association, the presence of the sickle cell disease-causing mutation, suggesting an indirect diagnostic method for the disease and marking the first use of SNPs in genetic linkage analysis of human diseases.

In the recent decade, Kan has applied gene therapy and genome editing techniques to treat thalassemia, sickle cell disease and blood cancer.

== Personal life ==
Kan married Alvera Limauro in 1964 in Boston. They met each other on their first day at Frank H. Gardner's lab at the Peter Bent Brigham Hospital (now part of Brigham and Women's Hospital) in Boston, but did not started dating 2 years later. They have 2 daughters, Susan, a lawyer in San Francisco, and Deborah, a former Wall Street Journal reporter in Hong Kong and the founder an online information platform for Alzheimer's disease called Being Patient, and 5 grandchildren. As of 2019, Kan and his wife live in San Francisco.

== Honors and awards ==
- William Dameshek Prize, American Society of Hematology (1979)
- Henry M. Stratton Medal, American Society of Hematology (1980)
- George Thorn Award, Howard Hughes Medical Institute (1980)
- Fellow of the Royal Society (1981) (the first person of Chinese descent to be elected)
- Faculty Research Lecture Award Basic Science, UCSF (1983-84)
- William Allan Award (1984)
- Lita Annenberg Hazen Award for Excellence in Clinical Research (1984)
- Canada Gairdner International Award (1984)
- Member of the National Academy of Sciences (1986)
- Member of the Third World Academy of Sciences (1986)
- Waterford Biomedical Science Award (1987)
- Member of Academia Sinica (1988)
- Harriet P. Dustan Award (now Harriet P. Dustan Award for Science as Related to Medicine), American College of Physicians (1988)
- Warren Alpert Foundation Prize (1989)
- Sanremo International Prize for Genetic Research (1989)
- Albert Lasker Clinical Medical Research Award (now Lasker-DeBakey Clinical Medical Research Award) (1991)
- Christopher Columbus Discovery Award in Biomedical Research, National Institutes of Health (1991)
- City of Medicine Award, Durham, North Carolina (1992)
- Excellence 2000 Award, US Pan Asian American Chamber of Commerce (1993)
- Federation of Canadian Chinese Professionals (Ontario) Education Foundation Award of Merit (1994)
- Helmut Horten Research Award (1995)
- Foreign member of the Chinese Academy of Sciences (1996)
- Shaw Prize in Life Science & Medicine (2004)
- Lifetime Achievement Award, Society of Chinese Bioscientists in America (2006)
- Member of the American Philosophical Society (2009)
- Member of the National Academy of Medicine (then Institute of Medicine) (2011)
- Fellow of the American Association for Cancer Research Academy (2013)
- Precision Medicine World Conference Pioneer Award (2014)
- William S. McEllroy Distinguished Resident Award, University of Pittsburgh (2015)

The Y W Kan Professorship in Natural Sciences at the University of Hong Kong was created in Kan's honor.
