= Lennart Lindegren =

Swedish astronomer

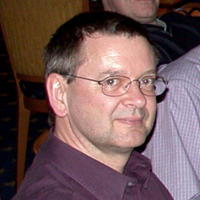
- Lindegren in 2008
- Born: 1950 (age 75–76); Sweden
- Known for: Astronomy, space astrometry, Hipparcos and Gaia missions
- Awards: ESA Director of Science Medal (1999); Fellow of Royal Swedish Academy of Sciences (2010); Honorary Doctorate of Paris Observatory (2011); Shaw Prize (2022)
- Scientific career
- Fields: Astronomy, astrometry, space science
- Workplaces: Lund Observatory, Lund University
- Doctoral advisor: Tord Elvius, Erik Høg
- Website: Personal Homepage

Notes
- List of publications (ADS)

Lennart Lindegren (born 1950) is a member of the staff at Lund Observatory, Sweden, where he obtained his PhD in 1980, and became a full professor of astronomy in 2000. Space astrometry and its various applications has been his main focus in astronomy since 1976. He has been involved in ESA's Hipparcos and Gaia missions throughout their duration.

== Contributions to Hipparcos ==
During the early studies of ESA's Hipparcos space astrometry mission, and while still a graduate student in 1976, he was "recruited" to the project by Erik Høg and thereafter was involved in various aspects of the mission definition and data analysis. He set out the overall principles of the astrometric data reduction aiming to combine and solve together the attitude, the system and the astrometric parameters of the stars. This crucial '3-step procedure' was used successfully by the two consortia (NDAC and FAST) later entrusted by ESA with the Hipparcos data processing.

The principle of reconstructing space astrometric positions from one-dimensional observations carried out in the innovative Hipparcos sky scanning mode was new to the field and challenging to implement given the available computational power in 1997. The numerical principles had to be demonstrated, together with the solution’s statistical properties. Already by the end of 1976, Lindegren had produced a set of definitive technical notes and simulations showing how to obtain a 'rigid sphere' with all astrometric parameters from a scanning satellite. Since that time he has contributed to several aspects of space astrometry.

From 1990, Lennart Lindegren led the Consortium NDAC (Northern Data Analysis Consortium) sharing with FAST (led by Jean Kovalevsky) the data processing of Hipparcos. In addition to the overall scientific coordinating responsibilities, he developed many of the approaches and algorithms related to the mission: his innovation, insight, and mathematical rigour impacted the optical and focal plane design, the instrument calibration, the scanning law, the attitude determination (and the associated 'dynamical smoothing'), the double star analysis (as observed via a signal modulated by a grid), the effects of chromaticity and thermal load fluctuations, the optimum combination of the NDAC and FAST catalogue solutions, and the link to an extragalactic reference frame.

He was member of ESA's Hipparcos Science Team for the entire duration of the project (1976–1997).

Erik Høg has written: "A new era of my life began on 1 September 1973 when I returned to Denmark with my family of five, after 15 years in Hamburg. I had obtained a tenure at the Copenhagen University where I was going to work on the construction of automatic control of the meridian circle in Brorfelde. Very soon, however, I heard of a young student at Lund Observatory who worked alone on modernizing the old meridian circle there. I went to Lund and 'found' Lennart. A few years later, Andrew Murray, my old colleague and member of the Hipparcos science team, would say: 'Erik, the best you have ever done for astronomy was to find Lennart!' and I agreed". Later Høg writes: "Of his numerous papers I will only mention two. He wrote a paper on 'Photoelectric astrometry', a subject I had proposed, where he systematically discussed the performance of methods for precise image location from observations. It remains a classical paper. The second paper to mention is about the rigidity of the celestial coordinate system obtained by the one-dimensional observations in a scanning satellite as TYCHO/Option A/Hipparcos. The question was asked in 1976 as mentioned above, but it took years before we had the answer which was affirmative. The study was led by Lennart and contains his brilliant mathematical analysis of the simulations, but he modestly left the position as first author to another person."

== Contributions to Gaia ==
Before the Hipparcos Catalogue was published, he was the first (with Michael Perryman), to set forth a new proposal for a more ambitious mission in terms of accuracy and sensitivity, resting on the same fundamental principles as Hipparcos. This was initially Roemer, and finally Gaia, eventually selected by ESA in 2000 (for a projected launch in 2012), and actually launched in December 2013. Lindegren contributed to the initial design of what was in the early phase an interferometer and in the assessment of the astrometric accuracy achievable. He also led the detailed design of the overall scheme of the astrometric solution, being a block iterative adjustment determining the attitude, the calibration and the system directly from the CCD images. This Astrometric Global Iterative Solution (AGIS) is now fully operational within the Gaia Data Processing and Analysis Consortium (DPAC).

Lindegren was a member of the ESA Gaia Science Advisory Group before mission selection, and the Gaia Science Team since selection in 2000.

Within the Gaia Data Processing and Analysis Consortium (DPAC), Lindegren leads the scientific implementation of the Astrometric Global Iterative Solution, a core element in the astrometric processing of the Gaia data. Between 2006–2010 he was project coordinator for the Marie Curie Research Training Network ELSA (European Leadership in Space Astrometry), aiming to develop the science of space astrometry and train the next generation of researchers in this area. Since 2010 he has served on the committee of the European Science Foundation's Research Networking Programme 'GREAT' (Gaia Research for European Astronomy Training).

== Publications ==
Lindegren's publications include more than 90 refereed papers on astrometry, reference frames, data processing, spectroscopy and instrument design. Besides those in space astrometry, a frequently cited paper deals with solar physics and the role of convection on the line profile, and another considers in a very general way the atmospheric limitations on small-field astrometry. He is a co-author of the canonical paper on the IAU 2000 'Resolutions for Astrometry, Celestial Mechanics, and Metrology in the Relativistic Framework'.

Crucially, the bulk of his contributions to space astrometry has been in the form of a series of unpublished technical notes for Hipparcos and Gaia, amounting to some 200 documents totalling around 3000 pages. They were used extensively in the development of the two projects. In addition to the mathematical principles they frequently include working algorithms (often with source code when relevant). Amongst them are, for Hipparcos, the three-step astrometric reduction, optimization of the scanning law, notes on the imaging properties used for the multiple star analysis, assessment of chromatic effects, attitude developments, and many others.

For Gaia, his technical notes cover the mathematical and statistical aspects of the Gaia instrument and processing (including the attitude determination and its mathematical representation with quaternions and splines), the modelling of the point/line spread functions, the CCD geometric calibrations, broad band photometry design, maximum likelihood determination of the CCD image centroiding, differential equations and optimal properties of the scanning law, along with the subtle systematic effects in astrometry caused by instrumental misalignments. All these important results that led to developments in the on-board metrology or to fundamental implementations in the processing, have appeared only in the form of technical notes, and therefore remain largely unknown outside of the Hipparcos and Gaia groups.

== Awards ==
On 19 May 1999, Lindegren was awarded the ESA's Director of Science Medal for his efforts in ESA's scientific missions. At a ceremony in Bern, Switzerland, the first four medals were presented to scientific consortia leaders of the Hipparcos mission: Catherine Turon and Jean Kovalevsky from France, Lennart Lindegren from Sweden, and Erik Høg from Denmark.

In 2009, Lindegren was elected as a member of the Royal Swedish Academy of Sciences. In 2011, he was awarded an Honorary Doctorate by the Paris Observatory, in recognition of his fundamental contributions to space astrometry over more than 30 years. In 2022 he received the Shaw Prize in Astronomy jointly with Michael Perryman.
