= Steven Balbus =

American astrophysicist (born 1953)

Steven Balbus FRS
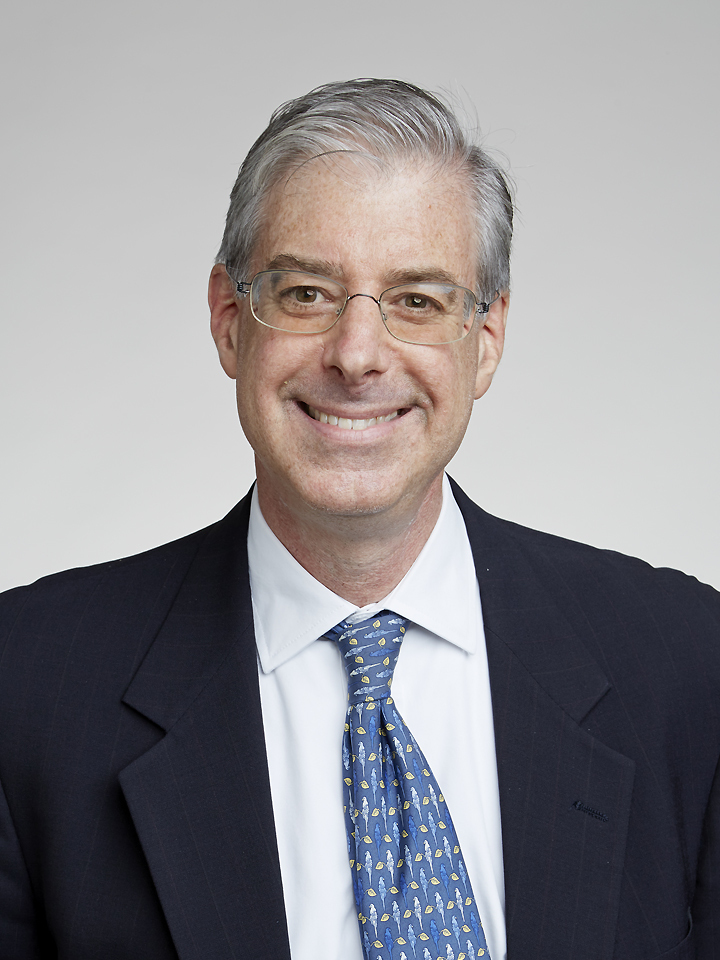
- Balbus in 2016
- Born: 23 November 1953 (age 72); Philadelphia, Pennsylvania, U.S.
- Education: MIT; University of California, Berkeley
- Employers: University of Oxford; University of Virginia; École Normale Supérieure
- Awards: Shaw Prize; Royal Society Wolfson Research Merit Award; Eddington Medal; IOP Dirac Medal
- Scientific career
- Thesis: The effects of thermal conduction in high temperature astrophysical gas dynamics (1981)
- Website: www2.physics.ox.ac.uk/contacts/people/balbus

Steven Andrew Balbus FRS (born 23 November 1953) is an American astrophysicist who is the Savilian Professor of Astronomy Emeritus at the University of Oxford and a senior research fellow at New College, Oxford. In 2013, he shared the Shaw Prize for Astronomy with John F. Hawley.

== Early life and education ==
Balbus was born in 1953 in Philadelphia, Pennsylvania. He attended the William Penn Charter School, received S.B. degrees in mathematics and in physics from the Massachusetts Institute of Technology (MIT) in 1975, and a PhD in theoretical astrophysics from the University of California, Berkeley in 1981, under the supervision of Christopher McKee.

== Research and career ==
Following his PhD, Balbus held postdoctoral research appointments at MIT and Princeton University. In 1985, Balbus joined the faculty of the University of Virginia. In 2004, he was appointed Professeur des Universités in the Physics Department of the École Normale Supérieure de Paris. He remained in Paris until 2012, when he moved to Oxford as the Savilian Professor of Astronomy. He retired from this post in October 2024, retaining Emeritus status. At Oxford, he taught astrophysical gas dynamics, general relativity, and supervised postdoctoral researchers and students.

Balbus' research is in theoretical astrophysics. He has made discoveries related to gravitational instability in the interstellar medium and several contributions to the theory of thermal processes in magnetised dilute plasmas. He is best known for a 1991 paper, published with former colleague John F. Hawley, describing what is now known as magnetorotational instability (MRI). Balbus has also contributed to the theory of the Sun's internal rotation. For many years, Balbus lectured an undergraduate course in general relativity at the University of Oxford; several lectures coincided with the discovery of gravitational waves in February 2016. He is the author of the textbook An Introduction to General Relativity and Cosmology: Theory, Observations, and Applications (2026, Princeton University Press).

== Awards and honours ==
Balbus was awarded a Chaire d'excellence in 2004 by the French Ministry of Higher Education. In 2013, he shared the Shaw Prize in Astronomy with Hawley for their work on the MRI. Considered one of the highest honours in astronomy, the prize included a US$1 million cash award. According to the Shaw selection committee the "discovery and elucidation of the magnetorotational instability (MRI)" solved the previously "elusive" problem of accretion, a widespread phenomenon in astrophysics and "provides what to this day remains the only viable mechanism for the outward transfer of angular momentum in accretion disks".

Balbus is the recipient of a Royal Society Wolfson Research Merit Award, and has held visiting faculty positions at Princeton University (Bohdan Paczynski Visitor and Spitzer Lecturer, 2011) and the University of California, Berkeley (Visiting Miller Professor, 2012). In April 2015, Balbus was elected to the US National Academy of Sciences. He was elected a Fellow of the Royal Society (FRS) in 2016. In 2020 he was awarded the Eddington Medal of the Royal Astronomical Society, and in 2021 the Dirac Medal and Prize of the Institute of Physics. In 2023 he was awarded the Nick Kylafis Lectureship
