= Magnetorotational instability =

Fluid instability that causes turbulence in accretion disks

The magnetorotational instability (MRI) is a fluid instability that causes an accretion disk orbiting a massive central object to become turbulent. It arises when the angular velocity of a conducting fluid in a magnetic field decreases as the distance from the rotation center increases. It is also known as the Velikhov–Chandrasekhar instability or Balbus–Hawley instability in the literature, not to be confused with the electrothermal Velikhov instability. The MRI is of particular relevance in astrophysics where it is an important part of the dynamics in accretion disks.

Gases or liquids containing mobile electrical charges are subject to the influence of a magnetic field. In addition to hydrodynamical forces such as pressure and gravity, an element of magnetized fluid also feels the Lorentz force $\boldsymbol J\times\boldsymbol B\ ,$ where $\boldsymbol J$ is the current density and $\boldsymbol B$ is the magnetic field vector. If the fluid is in a state of differential rotation about a fixed origin, this Lorentz force can be surprisingly disruptive, even if the magnetic field is very weak. In particular, if the angular velocity of rotation $\Omega$ decreases with radial distance $R\ ,$ the motion is unstable: a fluid element undergoing a small displacement from circular motion experiences a destabilizing force that increases at a rate which is itself proportional to the displacement. This process is known as the Magnetorotational Instability, or "MRI".

In astrophysical settings, differentially rotating systems are very common and magnetic fields are ubiquitous. In particular, thin disks of gas are often found around forming stars or in binary star systems, where they are known as accretion disks. Accretion disks are also commonly present in the centre of galaxies, and in some cases can be extremely luminous: quasars, for example, are thought to originate from a gaseous disk surrounding a very massive black hole. Our modern understanding of the MRI arose from attempts to understand the behavior of accretion disks in the presence of magnetic fields; it is now understood that the MRI is likely to occur in a very wide variety of different systems.

== Discovery ==
The MRI was first noticed in a non-astrophysical context by Evgeny Velikhov in 1959 when considering the stability of Couette flow of an ideal hydromagnetic fluid. His result was later generalized by Subrahmanyan Chandrasekhar in 1960. This mechanism was proposed by David Acheson and Raymond Hide (1973) to perhaps play a role in the context of the Earth's geodynamo problem. Although there was some follow-up work in later decades (Fricke, 1969; Acheson and Hide 1972; Acheson and Gibbons 1978), the generality and power of the instability were not fully appreciated until 1991, when Steven A. Balbus and John F. Hawley gave a relatively simple elucidation and physical explanation of this important process.

== Physical process ==
A simple model of MRI

In a magnetized, perfectly conducting fluid, the magnetic forces behave in some very important respects as though the elements of fluid were connected with elastic bands: trying to displace such an element perpendicular to a magnetic line of force causes an attractive force proportional to the displacement, like a spring under tension. Normally, such a force is restoring, a strongly stabilizing influence that would allow a type of magnetic wave to propagate. If the fluid medium is not stationary but rotating, however, attractive forces can actually be destabilizing. The MRI is a consequence of this surprising behavior.

Consider, for example, two masses, m_{i} ("inner") and m_{o} ("outer") connected by a spring under tension, both masses in orbit around a central body, M_{c}. In such a system, the angular velocity of circular orbits near the center is greater than the angular velocity of orbits farther from the center, but the angular momentum of the inner orbits is smaller than that of the outer orbits. If m_{i} is allowed to orbit a little bit closer to the center than m_{o}, it will have a slightly higher angular velocity. The connecting spring will pull back on m_{i}, and drag m_{o} forward. This means that m_{i} experiences a retarding torque, loses angular momentum, and must fall inward to an orbit of smaller radius, corresponding to a smaller angular momentum. m_{o}, on the other hand, experiences a positive torque, acquires more angular momentum, and moves outward to a higher orbit. The spring stretches yet more, the torques become yet larger, and the motion is unstable! Because magnetic forces act like a spring under tension connecting fluid elements, the behavior of a magnetized fluid is almost exactly analogous to this simple mechanical system. This is the essence of MRI.

== A more detailed explanation ==
To see this unstable behavior more quantitatively, consider the equations of motion for a fluid element mass in circular motion with an angular velocity $\Omega\ .$ In general $\Omega$ will be a function of the distance from the rotation axis $R\ ,$ and we assume that the orbital radius is $r=R_0\ .$ The centripetal acceleration required to keep the mass in orbit is $-R\Omega^2(R)$; the minus sign indicates a direction toward the center. If this force is gravity from a point mass at the center, then the centripetal acceleration is simply $-GM/R^2,$ where $G$ is the gravitational constant and $M$ is the central mass. Let us now consider small departures from the circular motion of the orbiting mass element caused by some perturbing force. We transform variables into a rotating frame moving with the orbiting mass element at angular velocity $\Omega(R_0)=\Omega_0\ ,$ with origin located at the unperturbed, orbiting location of the mass element. As usual when working in a rotating frame, we need to add to the equations of motion a Coriolis force $-2\boldsymbol\Omega_0\times\boldsymbol v$ plus a centrifugal force $R\Omega_0^2\ .$ The velocity $v$ is the velocity as measured in the rotating frame. Furthermore, we restrict our attention to a small neighborhood near $R_0\ ,$ say $R_0+x\ ,$ with $x$ much smaller than $R_0\ .$ Then the sum of the centrifugal and centripetal forces is

$$R[\Omega_0^2 - \Omega^2(R_0+x)] \simeq -x R{d\Omega^2\over dR}$$	1

to linear order in $x\ .$ With our $x$ axis pointing radial outward from the unperturbed location of the fluid element and our $y$ axis pointing in the direction of increasing azimuthal angle (the direction of the unperturbed orbit), the $x$ and $y$ equations of motion for a small departure from a circular orbit $R=R_0$ are:

$$\ddot{x} - 2\Omega_0 \dot{y} = -x R{d\Omega^2\over dR} +f_x$$	2

$$\ddot{y} + 2\Omega_0 \dot{x} =f_y$$	3

where $f_x$ and $f_y$ are the forces per unit mass in the $x$ and $y$ directions, and a dot indicates a time derivative (i.e., $\dot x$ is the $x$ velocity, $\ddot x$ is the $x$ acceleration, etc.). Provided that $f_x$ and $f_y$ are either 0 or linear in x and y, this is a system of coupled second-order linear differential equations that can be solved analytically. In the absence of external forces, $f_x = 0$ and $f_y = 0$, the equations of motion have solutions with the time dependence $e^{i\omega t}\ ,$ where the angular frequency $\omega$ satisfies the equation

$$\omega^2 = 4\Omega_0^2 + R{d\Omega^2\over dR}\equiv \kappa^2$$	4

where $\kappa^2$ is known as the epicyclic frequency. In the Solar System, for example, deviations from a sun-centered circular orbit that are familiar ellipses when viewed by an external viewer at rest, appear instead as small radial and azimuthal oscillations of the orbiting element when viewed by an observer moving with the undisturbed circular motion. These oscillations trace out a small retrograde ellipse (i.e. rotating in the opposite sense of the large circular orbit), centered on the undisturbed orbital location of the mass element.

The epicyclic frequency may equivalently be written $(1/R^3)(dR^4\Omega^2/dR)\ ,$ which shows that it is proportional to the radial derivative of the angular momentum per unit mass, or specific angular momentum. The specific angular momentum must increase outward if stable epicyclic oscillations are to exist, otherwise displacements would grow exponentially, corresponding to instability. This is a very general result known as the Rayleigh criterion (Chandrasekhar 1961) for stability. For orbits around a point mass, the specific angular momentum is proportional to $R^{1/2}\ ,$ so the Rayleigh criterion is well satisfied.

Consider next the solutions to the equations of motion if the mass element is subjected to an external restoring force, $f_x=-Kx\ ,$ $f_y=-Ky$ where $K$ is an arbitrary constant (the "spring constant"). If we now seek solutions for the modal displacements in $x$ and $y$ with time dependence $e^{i\omega t}\ ,$ we find a much more complex equation for $\omega\ :$

$$\omega^4 - (2K+\kappa^2)\omega^2 +K(K+Rd\Omega^2/dR) =0$$	5

Even though the spring exerts an attractive force, it may destabilize. For example, if the spring constant $K$ is sufficiently weak, the dominant balance will be between the final two terms on the left side of the equation. Then, a decreasing outward angular velocity profile will produce negative values for $\omega^2\ ,$ and both positive and negative imaginary values for $\omega\ .$ The negative imaginary root results not in oscillations, but in exponential growth of very small displacements. A weak spring therefore causes the type of instability described qualitatively at the end of the previous section. A strong spring on the other hand, will produce oscillations, as one intuitively expects.

== The spring-like nature of magnetic fields ==
The conditions inside a perfectly conducting fluid in motion is often a good approximation to astrophysical gases. In the presence of a magnetic field $\boldsymbol B\ ,$ a moving conductor responds by trying to eliminate the Lorentz force on the free charges. The magnetic force acts in such a way as to locally rearrange these charges to produce an internal electric field of $\boldsymbol {E=-{v\times B}}\ .$ In this way, the direct Lorentz force on the charges $\boldsymbol {E+v\times B}$ vanishes. (Alternatively, the electric field in the local rest frame of the moving charges vanishes.) This induced electric field can now itself induce further changes in the magnetic field $\boldsymbol B$ according to Faraday's law,

$$- \boldsymbol {\nabla\times E} = {\partial\boldsymbol B\over\partial t}\quad {\rm or}\quad\boldsymbol {\nabla\times (v\times B)} = {\partial\boldsymbol B\over\partial t}$$	6

Another way to write this equation is that if in time $\delta t$ the fluid makes a displacement $\boldsymbol \xi = \boldsymbol v\delta t\ ,$ then the magnetic field changes by

$$\delta \boldsymbol B = \boldsymbol {\nabla\times (\xi \times B)}$$	7

The equation of a magnetic field in a perfect conductor in motion has a special property: the combination of Faraday induction and zero Lorentz force makes the field lines behave as though they were painted, or "frozen," into the fluid. In particular, if $\boldsymbol B$ is initially nearly constant and $\xi$ is a divergence-free displacement, then our equation reduces to

$$\delta \boldsymbol B = \left(\boldsymbol{B}\cdot\boldsymbol\nabla\right) \boldsymbol\xi,$$	8

because of the vector calculus identity $\nabla \times (\boldsymbol{\xi} \times \boldsymbol{B}) = \boldsymbol{\xi} (\nabla \cdot \boldsymbol{B}) - \boldsymbol{B} (\nabla \cdot \boldsymbol{\xi}) + (\boldsymbol{B} \cdot \nabla) \boldsymbol{\xi} - (\boldsymbol{\xi} \cdot \nabla) \boldsymbol{B} \ .$ Out of these 4 terms, $\boldsymbol\nabla \cdot \boldsymbol{B} = 0$ is one of Maxwell's equations. By the divergence-free assumption, $\boldsymbol\nabla \cdot \boldsymbol{\xi} = 0$. $(\boldsymbol{\xi} \cdot \boldsymbol\nabla) \boldsymbol{B} = 0$ because $\boldsymbol{B}$ is assumed to be nearly constant. Equation 8 shows that $\boldsymbol B$ changes only when there is a shearing displacement along the field line. To understand the MRI, it is sufficient to consider the case in which $\boldsymbol B$ is uniform in vertical $z$ direction, and $\xi$ varies as $e^{ikz}\ .$ Then

$$\delta \boldsymbol B =ikB\boldsymbol \xi,$$	9

where it is understood that the real part of this equation expresses its physical content. (If $\boldsymbol \xi$ is proportional to $\cos(kz)$, for example, then $\delta\boldsymbol B$ is proportional to $-\sin(kz)$.)

A magnetic field exerts a force per unit volume on an electrically neutral, conducting fluid equal to $\boldsymbol J\times\boldsymbol B\ .$ Ampere's circuital law gives $\mu_0\boldsymbol{J} = \boldsymbol{\nabla} \times \boldsymbol{B}\ ,$ because Maxwell's correction is neglected in the MHD approximation. The force per unit volume becomes

$$\frac{1}{\mu_0} \boldsymbol{(\nabla\times B)\times B} = -\boldsymbol{\nabla}\left(\frac{B^2}{2\mu_0}\right) + \frac{1}{\mu_0}\boldsymbol{ (B\cdot\nabla) B}$$	10

where we have used the same vector calculus identity. This equation is fully general, and makes no assumptions about the strength or direction of the magnetic field. The first term on the right is analogous to a pressure gradient. In our problem it may be neglected because it exerts no force in the plane of the disk, perpendicular to $z\ .$ The second term acts like a magnetic tension force, analogous to a taut string. For a small disturbance $\delta\boldsymbol B\ ,$ it exerts an acceleration given by force divided by mass, or equivalently, force per unit volume divided by mass per unit volume:

$$\frac{1}{\mu_0\rho} \boldsymbol{(B\cdot\nabla)\delta B} = \frac{ikB\boldsymbol {\delta B}}{\mu_0\rho} = -\frac{k^2 B^2}{\mu_0\rho}(\boldsymbol \xi)$$	11

Thus, a magnetic tension force gives rise to a return force which is directly proportional to the displacement. This means that the oscillation frequency $\omega$ for small displacements in the plane of rotation of a disk with a uniform magnetic field in the vertical direction satisfies an equation ("dispersion relation") exactly analogous to equation 5, with the "spring constant" $K = k^2B^2 / \mu_0\rho$:

$$\omega^4 - \left[2 \frac{k^2B^2}{\mu_0\rho} + \kappa^2\right] \omega^2 + \frac{k^2 B^2}{\mu_0\rho} \left[\frac{k^2 B^2}{\mu_0\rho} + R \frac{d\Omega^2}{dR}\right] =0$$	12

As before, if $d\Omega^2/dR < 0$, there is an exponentially growing root of this equation for wavenumbers $k$ satisfying $(k^2B^2/\mu_0\rho)< - Rd\Omega^2/dR\ .$ This corresponds to the MRI. Notice that the magnetic field appears in equation 12 only as the product $kB$. Thus, even if $B$ is very small, for very large wavenumbers $k$ this magnetic tension can be important. This is why the MRI is so sensitive to even very weak magnetic fields: their effect is amplified by multiplication by $k$. Moreover, it can be shown that MRI is present regardless of the magnetic field geometry, as long as the field is not too strong.

In astrophysics, one is generally interested in the case for which the disk is supported by rotation against the gravitational attraction of a central mass. A balance between the Newtonian gravitational force and the radial centripetal force immediately gives

$$\Omega^2 = \frac{GM}{R^3}$$	13

where $G$ is the Newtonian gravitational constant, $M$ is the central mass, and $R$ is radial location in the disk. Since $Rd\Omega^2/dR = -3\Omega^2<0\ ,$ this so-called Keplerian disk is unstable to the MRI . Without a weak magnetic field, the flow would be stable.

For a Keplerian disk, the maximum growth rate is $\gamma = 3\Omega/4\ ,$ which occurs at a wavenumber satisfying $(k^2B^2/\mu_0\rho) = 15\Omega^2/16\ .$ $\gamma$ is very rapid, corresponding to an amplification factor of more than 100 per rotation period. The nonlinear development of the MRI into fully developed turbulence may be followed via large scale numerical computation.

== Applications and laboratory experiments ==
Interest in the MRI is based on the fact that it appears to give an explanation for the origin of turbulent flow in astrophysical accretion disks (Balbus and Hawley, 1991). A promising model for the compact, intense X-ray sources discovered in the 1960s was that of a neutron star or black hole drawing in ("accreting") gas from its surroundings (Prendergast and Burbidge, 1968). Such gas always accretes with a finite amount of angular momentum relative to the central object, and so it must first form a rotating disk — it cannot accrete directly onto the object without first losing its angular momentum. But how an element of gaseous fluid managed to lose its angular momentum and spiral onto the central object was not at all obvious.

One explanation involved shear-driven turbulence (Shakura and Sunyaev, 1973). There would be significant shear in an accretion disk (gas closer to the centre rotates more rapidly than outer disk regions), and shear layers often break down into turbulent flow. The presence of shear-generated turbulence, in turn, produces the powerful torques needed to transport angular momentum from one (inner) fluid element to another (farther out).

The breakdown of shear layers into turbulence is routinely observed in flows with velocity gradients, but without systematic rotation. This is an important point, because rotation produces strongly stabilizing Coriolis forces, and this is precisely what occurs in accretion disks . As can be seen in equation 5, the K = 0 limit produces Coriolis-stabilized oscillations, not exponential growth. These oscillations are present under much more general conditions as well: a recent laboratory experiment (Ji et al., 2006) has shown stability of the flow profile expected in accretion disks under conditions in which otherwise troublesome dissipation effects are (by a standard measure known as the Reynolds number) well below one part in a million. All of this changes, however, are when even a very weak magnetic field is present. The MRI produces torques that are not stabilized by Coriolis forces. Large scale numerical simulations of the MRI indicate that the rotational disk flow breaks down into turbulence (Hawley et al., 1995), with strongly enhanced angular momentum transport properties. This is just what is required for the accretion disk model to work. The formation of stars (Stone et al., 2000), the production of X-rays in neutron star and black hole systems (Blaes, 2004), and the creation of active galactic nuclei (Krolik, 1999) and gamma ray bursts (Wheeler, 2004) are all thought to involve the development of the MRI at some level.

Thus far, we have focused rather exclusively on the dynamical breakdown of laminar flow into turbulence triggered by a weak magnetic field, but it is also the case that the resulting highly agitated flow can act back on this same magnetic field. Embedded magnetic field lines are stretched by the turbulent flow, and it is possible that systematic field amplification could result. The process by which fluid motions are converted to magnetic field energy is known as a dynamo (Moffatt, 1978); the two best studied examples are the Earth's liquid outer core and the layers close to the surface of the Sun. Dynamo activity in these regions is thought to be responsible for maintaining the terrestrial and solar magnetic fields. In both of these cases thermal convection is likely to be the primary energy source, though in the case of the Sun differential rotation may also play an important role. Whether the MRI is an efficient dynamo process in accretion disks is currently an area of active research (Fromang and Papaloizou, 2007).

There may also be applications of the MRI outside of the classical accretion disk venue. Internal rotation in stars (Ogilvie, 2007), and even planetary dynamos (Petitdemange et al., 2008) may, under some circumstances, be vulnerable to the MRI in combination with convective instabilities. These studies are also ongoing.

Finally, the MRI can, in principle, be studied in the laboratory (Ji et al., 2001), though these experiments are very difficult to implement. A typical set-up involves either concentric spherical shells or coaxial cylindrical shells. Between (and confined by) the shells, there is a conducting liquid metal such as sodium or gallium. The inner and outer shells are set in rotation at different rates, and viscous torques compel the trapped liquid metal to differentially rotate. The experiment then investigates whether the differential rotation profile is stable or not in the presence of an applied magnetic field.

A claimed detection of the MRI in a spherical shell experiment (Sisan et al., 2004), in which the underlying state was itself turbulent, awaits confirmation at the time of this writing (2009). A magnetic instability that bears some similarity to the MRI can be excited if both vertical and azimuthal magnetic fields are present in the undisturbed state (Hollerbach and Rüdiger, 2005). This is sometimes referred to as the helical-MRI, (Liu et al., 2006) though its precise relation to the MRI described above has yet to be fully elucidated. Because it is less sensitive to stabilizing ohmic resistance than is the classical MRI, this helical magnetic instability is easier to excite in the laboratory, and there are indications that it may have been found (Stefani et al., 2006). The detection of the classical MRI in a hydrodynamically quiescent background state has yet to be achieved in the laboratory, however.

The spring-mass analogue of the standard MRI has been demonstrated in rotating Taylor–Couette / Keplerian-like flow (Hung et al. 2019).
