= Max Planck Institute for Radio Astronomy =

German research institute

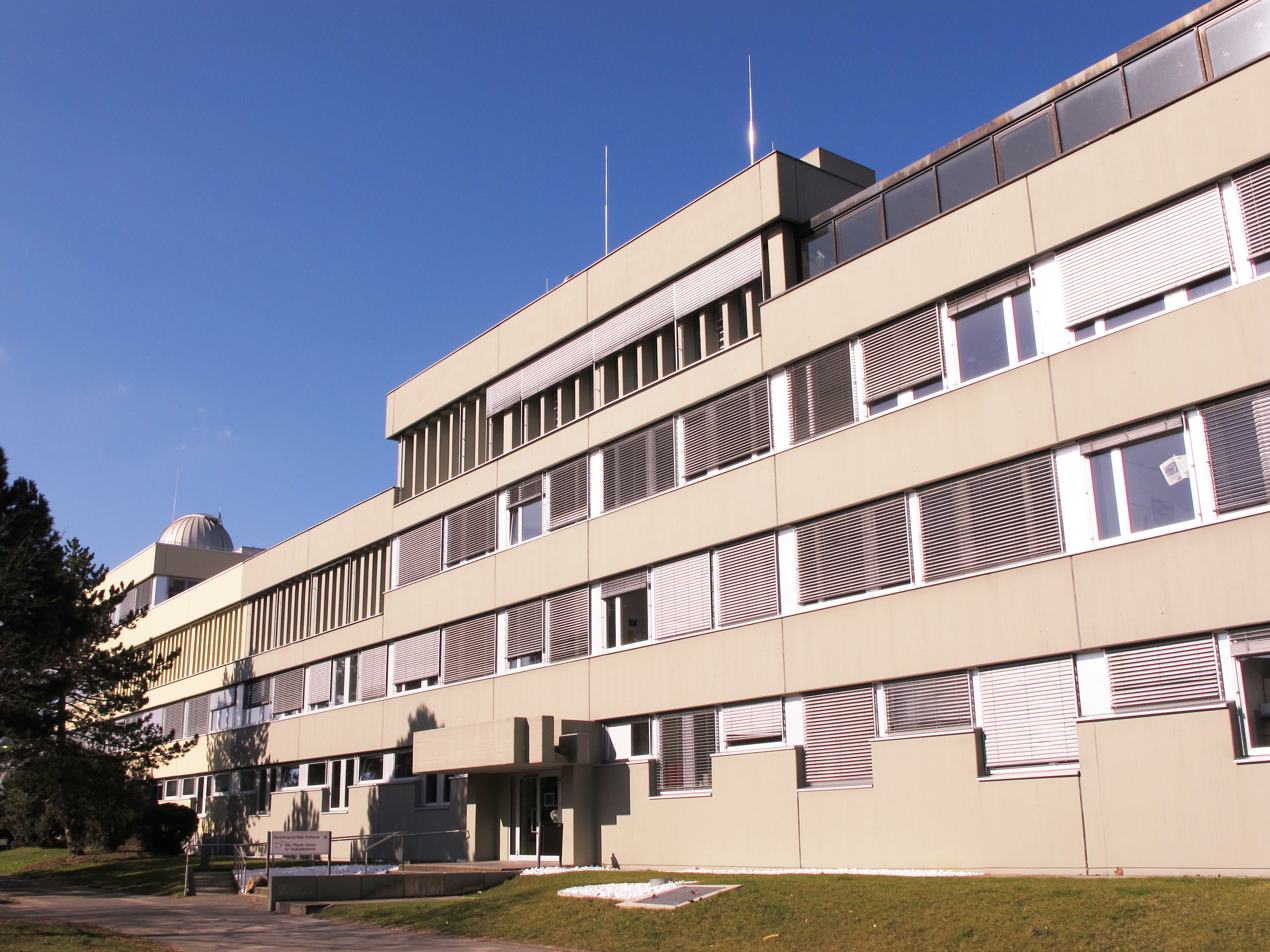
The Max Planck Institute for Radio Astronomy in Bonn (main entrance). The southern wing to the left (with yellow front) belongs to the Argelander-Institute for Astronomy of the University of Bonn.

The Max Planck Institute for Radio Astronomy (MPIfR) (German: Max-Planck-Institut für Radioastronomie) is located in Bonn, Germany. It is one of 80 institutes in the Max Planck Society (German: Max-Planck-Gesellschaft). 50°43′47.6″N 7°4′9.2″E

== History ==
By combining the already existing radio astronomy faculty of the University of Bonn led by Otto Hachenberg with the new Max Planck institute, the Max Planck Institute for Radio Astronomy was formed. In 1972 the 100-m radio telescope in Effelsberg was opened. The institute building was enlarged in 1983 and 2002.

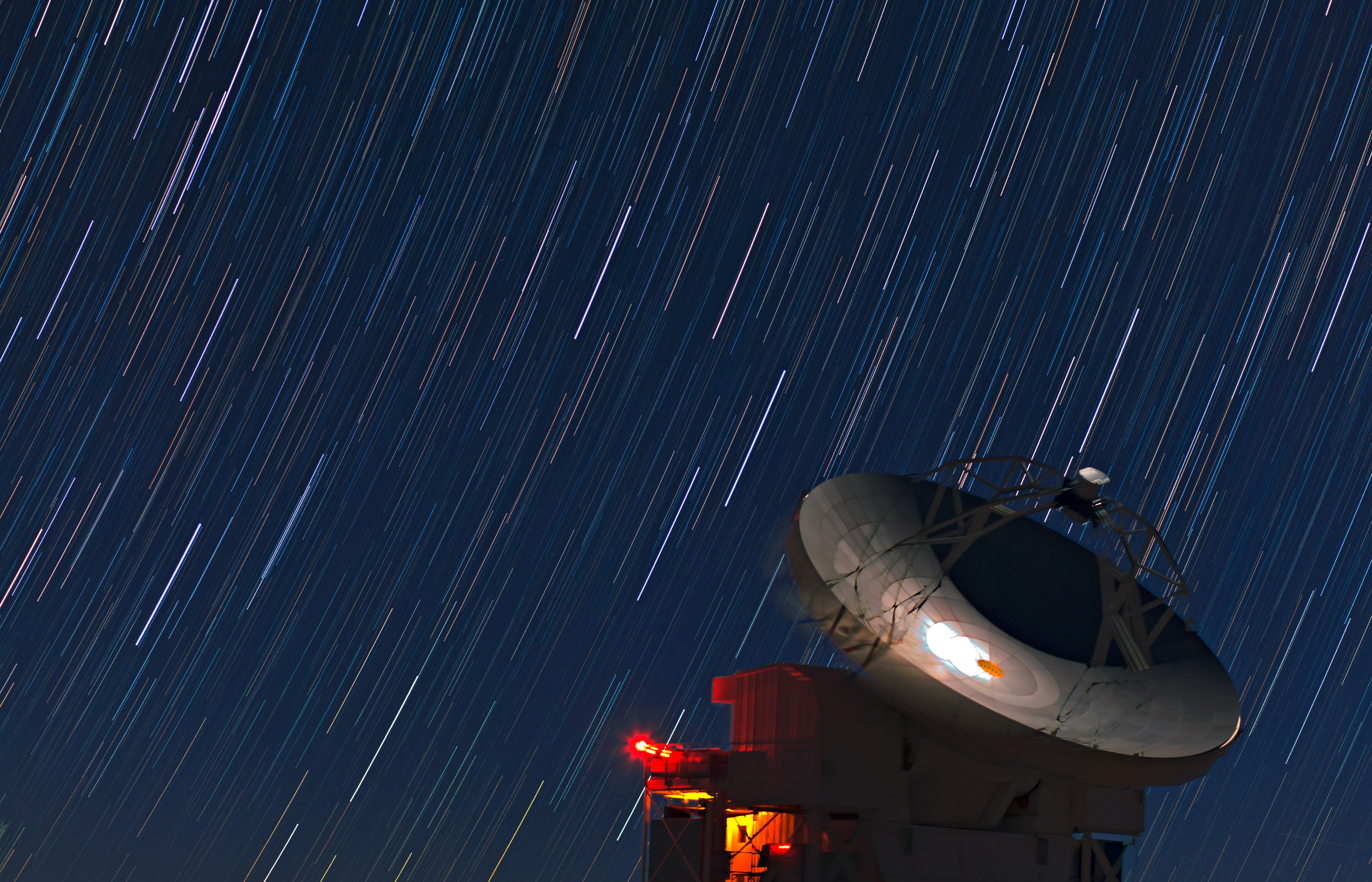
The Atacama Pathfinder Experiment is a collaboration between the Max Planck Institute for Radio Astronomy, the Onsala Space Observatory and ESO.

The southern wing of the whole complex is occupied by the Argelander Institute of Astronomy of the University of Bonn.

== Research Focus ==
The main field of work at the institute is radio astronomy. Theoretical astrophysics is another major area of focus. Other fields of research conducted at the MPIfR include:

- Star Formation and Galaxy Evolution (Astrochemistry, Star Formation, Galactic Surveys etc.)
- Fundamental Physics in Radio Astronomy (γ-Ray Pulsars, Theories of Gravity, Cosmic Magnetism, Pulsar Surveys, Neutron Stars etc.)

== Structure ==
The Institute has three main research groups, each with its own Director

=== Departments ===
- Fundamental Physics (Michael Kramer)
- Star Formation and Galaxy Evolution (Amélie Saintonge)
- VLBI and Radio Astronomy (Anton Zensus)

=== Independent Research Groups ===
- Lise Meitner Group on Fast Radio Bursts as Astrophysical Tools (Laura Spitler)

== Graduate Program ==
The International Max Planck Research School (IMPRS) for Astronomy and Astrophysics is a highly competitive-entry graduate program offering a Ph.D. The school is run in cooperation with the University of Bonn and University of Cologne.
