= Derek McNally =

British astronomer (1934–2020)

Derek McNally (1934–2020) was a British astronomer and former general secretary of the IAU.

== Personal life ==
Derek McNally was born on 28 October 1934 in Belfast, Northern Ireland.

== Education ==
He studied for a Bachelor of Science at Queen's University Belfast, graduating in 1956. This was followed by a Master of Science in 1957. Although initially interested in nuclear physics, during his Masters he read a book by Fred Hoyle that changed his interest to astronomy. He subsequently studied for a PhD at the Royal Holloway College, from which he graduated in 1961.

== Career ==
He was an assistant lecturer in mathematics at Royal Holloway College from 1959 until 1960, during his PhD. After graduating from his PhD, he moved to the University College London, where he was an assistant lecturer (1960–1962), lecturer (1962–1970), and senior lecturer (1970–1999). He was assistant director of the University of London Observatory (1966–1989) and subsequently became director from 1989 to 1997.

He was chairman of the International Astronomical Union Working Group on Adverse Environmental Impacts on Astronomy (1997–2000). He was visiting fellow at the University of Hertfordshire since 1999. He became Chairman of the International Council of Scientific Unions Working Group on Adverse Environmental Impacts on Astronomy from 1993 till 1997.

He was secretary of the Royal Astronomical Society (1966–1971), then vice president (1971–1972) and treasurer in 1996.

At the International Astronomical Union, he was the assistant general secretary of the executive committee in 1985–88, before serving as the general secretary of the executive committee in 1988–91. He attended all IAU conferences between 1964 and 2006.

He was general secretary of the Institute of Physics from 1988 to 1991.

From 1981 to 1983 he held the office of president of the Junior Astronomical Society, the name of which changed in 1994 to the Society for Popular Astronomy.

== Research ==
He initially researched positional astronomy, before changing to star formation due to the advent of digital computers.

== Death ==
He died in 2020.
