= European Astronomical Society =

Learned society

- Abbreviation: EAS
- Formation: 1990; 36 years ago
- Type: NGO, learned society
- Purpose: To contribute to and promote the advancement of astronomy, in its broadest sense, in Europe by all suitable means.
- Headquarters: Department of Astronomy, University of Geneva
- Location: Geneva, Switzerland
- President: (Italy) Sara Lucatello
- Vice-President: (Netherlands) Lex Kaper
- Vice-President: (France) Nabila Aghanim
- Website: eas.unige.ch

The European Astronomical Society (EAS) is a learned society, founded under the Swiss Civil Code in 1990, as an association to contribute and promote the advancement of astronomy in Europe, and to deal with astronomical matters at a European level. It is a society of individual professional astronomers, and all European astronomers can be members independently of their field of work or country of work or origin. The society offers a forum for discussion on all aspects of astronomical development in Europe, and is the organisation that represents the interests of astronomers in discussions of European-wide developments.

Agata Różańska (Poland) serves as the EAS Newsletter editor.

== Presidents ==
The President of the European Astronomical Society chairs the governing Council of the EAS and liaises with similar societies in countries around the world, and with the International Astronomical Union on behalf of the European astronomy community. The first person to hold the title of President of the European Astronomical Society was Lodewijk Woltjer, a post he held from the founding of the EAS until 1994. The post has a term of office of four years, the same as the other offices on the governing Council of the Society, and the office transfers from the incumbent at the conclusion of the final EAS Annual Meeting of their term. Thierry Courvoisier and Roger Davies are the only holders to have been re-elected for a second term.

The current president is Sara Lucatello (Padua, Italy), who took up the role in 2024.

#	Image	Name	Start year	End year	Notes	Reference
01		Lodewijk Woltjer	1990	21 August 1993		
02		Paul Murdin	21 August 1993	5 July 1997		
03		Jean-Paul Zahn	5 July 1997	2001		
04		Harvey Raymond Butcher	2001	2006		
05		Joachim Krautter	2006	2010		
06		Thierry Courvoisier	2010	2017		
07		Roger Davies	2017	2024		
08		Sara Lucatello	2024			

== Prizes ==
The European Astronomical Society awards several prizes on an annual or biannual basis.

Year established	Prize		Purpose of award	Notes
2008	Tycho Brahe Prize		Awarded in recognition of the development or exploitation of European instruments, or for major discoveries based largely on such instruments.	Named in honour of the influential sixteenth-century Danish astronomer Tycho Brahe.
2010	Lodewijk Woltjer Lecture		To honour astronomers of outstanding scientific distinction.	Named in honour of the first President of the European Astronomical Society, Lodewijk Woltjer.
2013	MERAC Prizes in	Theoretical Astrophysics	Awarded to best Early Career Researcher (on odd years) and for best Doctoral Thesis (on even years).	
2013	MERAC Prizes in	Observational Astrophysics	Awarded to best Early Career Researcher (on odd years) and for best Doctoral Thesis (on even years).	
2013	MERAC Prizes in	New Technologies (Instrumental/Computational)	Awarded to best Early Career Researcher (on odd years) and for best Doctoral Thesis (on even years).	
2020	Fritz Zwicky Prize for Astrophysics and Cosmology		Awarded to those who have obtained fundamental and outstanding results related to astrophysics and/or cosmology.	Awarded biennially on behalf of the Fritz Zwicky Foundation.

== See also ==
- List of astronomical societies
