= Jean-Philippe Uzan =

French cosmologist (born 1969)

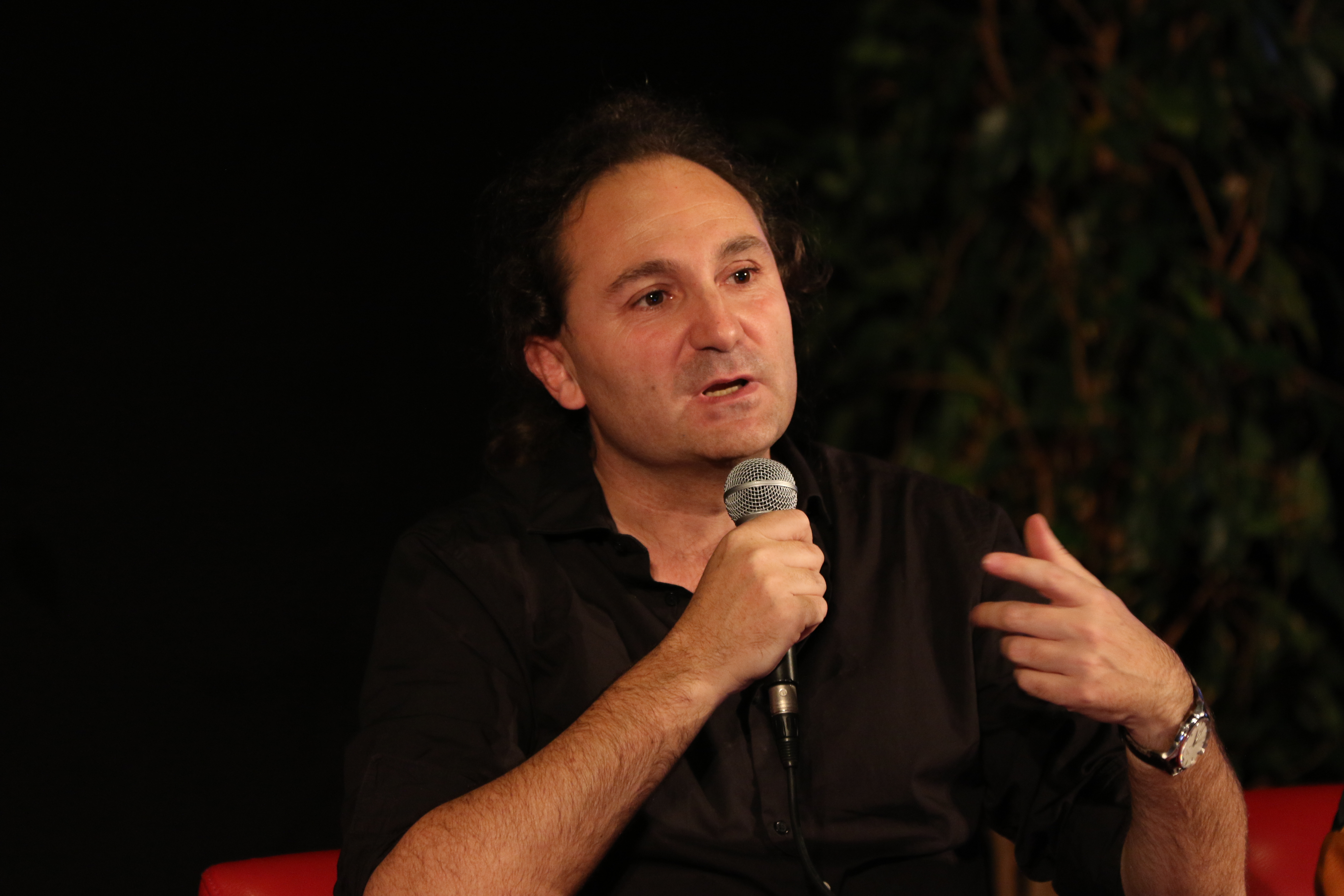
Image of Jean-Philippe Uzan

Jean-Philippe Uzan (born 1969) is a French cosmologist and directeur de recherche employed by the Centre national de la recherche scientifique (CNRS).

== Education and career ==
In 1987 Uzan graduated from secondary school with the degree Baccalauréat C with honours. From 1987 to 1990 he studied at Lycée Saint-Louis to prepare for competitive scientific examinations. From 1990 to 1993 he studied in the Engineering School of the École des Mines de Paris. There he graduated in 1993 with a civil engineering degree with specialisation in Earth science. From 1993 to 1994 he did his French military service as a cooperant doing research at the Institutet for rymdfysik (IRF, Swedish Institute of Space Physics). At Paris-Sud University (Paris XI), he obtained a Diplôme d'études approfondies (DEA) in theoretical physics and then completed a Ph.D. thesis in theoretical physics in 1998. His thesis was supervised by Nathalie Deruelle, who worked at the (DARC, Department of Relativistic Astrophysics and Cosmology) at the Meudon Observatory. After holding a postdoctoral position under the supervision of Ruth Durrer at the department of theoretical physics of the University of Geneva, he was recruited in 1999 at the CNRS (section 02) and assigned to the physics laboratory theory from the University of Paris-Sud (Paris XI) at Orsay. He was assigned in 2005 to the Institut d'Astrophysique de Paris (IAP) and appointed directeur de recherche in 2009. He received his habilitation degree (Habilitation à diriger des recherches, HDR) in 2007 from Pierre and Marie Curie University (Paris 6).

Uzan specializes in gravitation and relativistic cosmology and is the author or coauthor of more than 130 articles in peer-reviewed journals. He is an editor for the journal Foundations of Physics.

From June 2013 to June 2017 he was the deputy director, with Cédric Villani as director, of the Institut Henri-Poincaré (IHP). Uzan contributed to the expansion of the institute and the creation of the Maison des Mathématiques containing, among other things, a museum of mathematics. He co-authored, with Cédric Villani and Vincent Moncorgé, the book La Maison des Mathématiques (2015) describing the life of the institute. Uzan also directed the collective work Modèles mathématiques (2017), describing the collection of models from the IHP library. In 2015, for the 100th anniversary of the publication of Einstein's theory of general relativity, Uzan co-authored and presented the documentary Einstein et la Relativité Générale, une histoire singulière (Einstein and General Relativity, a unique story). Directed by filmmaker Quentin Lazzarotto, the film features major international researchers such as Jocelyn Bell Burnell, Roger Penrose, Thibault Damour, and Carlo Rovelli.

Uzan was one of the keynote speakers invited for the public session of the 26th meeting of the Conférence générale des poids et mesures (CGPM, General Conference on Weights and Measures) on the day of the vote on the historical revision of the International System of Units on November 16, 2018, in Versailles.

He has collaborated with many artists and is the author or coauthor of nine popular science books. He also works on science outreach.

== Research ==
Jean-Philippe Uzan is a specialist in gravitation and relativistic cosmology. He worked on several aspects related to observational cosmology and the cosmology of the early universe.

He has developed numerous tests of general relativity at astrophysical and cosmological scales. The study of fundamental constants offers a test of the equivalence principle at the heart of Einstein's theory of gravitation. He established several constraints on fundamental constants' possible variations, in particular, from primordial nucleosynthesis, cosmic microwave background, population III stars, and the MICROSCOPE satellite results. He studied tensor-scalar theories (such as tensor–vector–scalar gravity, scalar–tensor–vector gravity and bi-scalar tensor vector gravity), various potential alternatives to general relativity, and their observational signatures in cosmology (primordial nucleosynthesis, cosmic microwave background, and large-scale structure). In 2001, he proposed, with Francis Bernardeau of the Commissariat à l'énergie atomique et aux énergies alternatives (CEA), a test of general relativity at cosmological scales.

In observational cosmology, he has worked on primordial nucleosynthesis, the cosmic microwave background, large-scale structure, the effects of gravitational lensing and the diffuse background of gravitational waves. In particular, he obtained the first prediction of the power spectrum of the stochastic background of gravitational waves of astrophysical origin and the power spectrum's correlations with the distribution of galaxies and the effects of gravitational shear. With Julien Larena and Pierre Fleury, he proposed in 2015 "stochastic lensing", a new approach to the effects of small-scale structures on the effects of gravitational lensing in cosmology and in 2017 a solution to the Ricci-Weyl problem.

He proposed various tests of the assumptions on which the standard model of cosmology is based. See, for an overview, his reviews. He proposed in 2008, with George F. R. Ellis and Chris Clarkson, a test of the Copernican principle and in 2016, with Cyril Pitrou and Thiago Pereira, a test of the isotropy of the expansion of the universe. Uzan with collaborators also proposed several tests of Etherington's cosmic distance duality relation (CDDR). He also studied the topology of the universe and obtained numerous constraints on the size and shape of the universe.

In the cosmology of the early universe, he also obtained results concerning the non-Gaussianity of large structures, whether during inflation or generated by nonlinear dynamics (in particular for their observational signatures on the cosmic microwave background), as well as on the theory of perturbations in non-isotropic space-times (of the type Bianchi I). With Lev Kofman and Francis Bernardeau, he proposed an extension of inflation leading to a modulation of perturbations during the warming phase.

With Shinji Mukohyama, he published a speculative model in which the physical concept of time is an emergent phenomenon.

== Awards and honours ==
- 2010: Prix Paul-Langevin of the Société française de physique
- 2011: Prix spécial du Festival d'astronomie de Haute-Maurienne, for the book Multivers – mondes possibles de l'astrophysique, de la philosophie et de l'imaginaire.
- 2015: Prix Georges Lemaître
- 2016: The composer Fabien Waksman dedicated to Uzan the musical composition Le baiser de la mort (The kiss of death), a quintet for string quartet and piano.
- 2016: The arboretum du Val des Dames in Gretz-Armainvilliers honoured him on October 27, 2016, with the planting of a tree (Populus lasiocarpa).
- 2019: Prix Ciel et Espace du livre d'astronomie 2019, for the book Big-Bang - comprendre l'univers depuis ici et maintenant
- 2020: The asteroid 35391 Uzan (having a diameter of about 5 km in diameter) is named in his honour.
- 2025: Prix Jules Janssen awarded by the Société astronomique de France.

== Books ==
=== Scientific monographs ===
- with Patrick Peter: Cosmologie Primordiale. Editions Belin. 2005. ISBN 2-7011-3664-4; 1^{e} édition; 784 pages; Peter, Patrick; Uzan, Jean-Philippe (2012). 2^{e} édition. Belin. ISBN 978-2-7011-6244-7.
  - Primordial cosmology. Oxford University Press. 2009. ISBN 978-0-19-966515-0; 836 pages; translated by Jasna Brujić and Claudia de Rham
- with Nathalie Deruelle: Mécanique et gravitation newtonienne. Editions Vuibert. 2006; 180 pages
- with N. Dereulle: Théories de la relativité Belin. April 2014; 683 pages
  - Relativity in modern physics. Oxford University Press. 2018. ISBN 978-0-19-108966-4; 704 pages; translated by Patricia de Forcrand-Millard

=== Non-technical books ===
- with Roland Lehoucq: Les constantes fondamentales. Editions Belin, 2005; 488 pages
- with Bénédicte Leclercq: De l'importance d'être une constante. Editions Dunod. 2005. ISBN 2-10-048750-7; 240 pages; translated into English and Italian)
  - The natural laws of the universe. Springer Verlag. 2008. ISBN 978-2-7491-5643-9. LCCN 2008921345; translation of L'importance d'être une constante
  - L'importance des constantes. Dunod. 2020; expanded version of L'importance d'être une constante
- with Barbara Martinez: La gravitation ou pourquoi tout tombe...toujours. Editions Le Pommier. 2005; 64 pages; children's book; translated into Italian, Korean, Spanish, Chinese, and Turkish)
- with Pascal Lemaître: Ici l'univers. Editions Le Pommier. 2007. ISBN 978-2-7465-0348-9; 64 pages; children's book; translated into Italian, Korean, Spanish, and Chinese)
- with Aurélien Barrau, Patrick Gyger, and Max Kistler: Multivers – mondes possibles de l'astrophysique, de la philosophie et de l'imaginaire. La Ville Brûle. 2010; 256 pages; reprint published by Champs Flammarion in 2020
- with C. Villani and Vincent Moncorgé: La maison des mathématiques. Le Cherche Midi. 2014. ISBN 978-2-7491-3353-9;
  - Villani, Cédric; Uzan, Jean-Philippe (2017). The house of mathematics. Le Cherche Midi. ISBN 978-2-7491-5643-9.
- L'harmonie secrète de l'univers. La ville brûle. 2017. ISBN 978-2-08-147882-4; 143 pages; reprinted by Champs Flammarion in 2020
- big-bang – comprendre l'univers depuis ici et maintenant. Flammarion. October 2018; prix du livre d'astronomie in 2019
