= Bernard Guinot =

French astronomer

Bernard René Guinot
- Born: September 8, 1925; Livarot-Pays-d'Auge, Calvados
- Died: March 6, 2017 (aged 91); Melun, Seine-et-Marne
- Citizenship: France
- Education: École nationale de la marine marchande University of Paris
- Awards: Prix Jules Janssen (1989); Rabi Award (1999)
- Scientific career
- Fields: Astronomy
- Workplaces: Paris Observatory

Bernard René Guinot (1925–2017) was a French astronomer. He is known for his contributions to the establishment of Temps Atomique International (TAI) and the geodetic reference system used in satellite navigation.

== Biography ==
From 1945 to 1952, Guinot served as an officer in the Messageries Maritimes. In 1952 he became an astronomer at the Paris Observatory, where he worked with André Danjon on applications and further developments of the Danjon prismatic astrolabe. The applications were especially concerned with precise determinations of polar motions and variations in the Earth's rotation. In 1958 with a dissertation on applications of the Danjon astrolabe, Guinot obtained his doctorate from the University of Paris. He continued his employment as an astronomer at the Paris Observatory until 1990. From 1984 to 1992 he was a physicien principal (senior physicist), and then a consultant, at the Bureau international des poids et mesures (BIPM).

Guinot served as a committee member for several commissions of the International Astronomical Union (IAU) and from 1961 to 1967 was the president of the IAU's Commission 19 Rotation of the Earth. He served as president for several organizations: the Conseil scientifique du service international du mouvement du pôle from 1962 to 1970, the Fédération des services d’astronomie et de géophysique from 1970 to 1972, and the Bureau des longitudes from 1984 to 1986.

On the 1st of October 1964, as the successor to Nicolas Stoyko, Guinot became the director of the Bureau International de l'Heure (BIH) and continued his directorship until the BIH ceased to exist in 1988. From 1975 to 1979 he was the director of the Laboratoire primaire du temp et des frequencies (LPTF).

In 1979 in the paper Basic problems in the kinematics of the rotation of the Earth, Guinot proposed the use of a new equatorial origin, the "non-rotating origin" (NRO), for defining the Earth rotation angle (ERA) in the Earth's axial tilt as the basis for Universal Time. He made important contributions to research on the measurement of time, to international cooperation in establishing standards for the measurement of time, and to organization networks for measurements in variation of Earth's rotation. He was one of the leading organizers of world-wide time metrology, networks for time comparison (particularly by satellite), and time dissemination for various users. He did research on the reliability of atomic time scales that use networks of clocks. He and his colleagues worked on a number of space experiments, such as determining the position of the Earth's pole using Doppler tracking of artificial satellites. He collaborated in research on determining the radial velocities of Mercury, studying movements in the atmosphere of Venus by spectroscopic methods, and measuring the time of a round trip from the Earth to the Moon and back of a reflected light pulse.

In July 1958 Bernard Guinot married Claudine Caillet. They had three sons.

== Awards and honours ==
Guinot received the CNRS Médaille de bronze in 1959. The Académie des sciences awarded him the Prix Feycinet in 1959, the Prix Deslandres in 1974, and the Prix du CEA in 1991. He received the Société astronomique de France Prix Jules Janssen in 1989 and the Académie de marine Prix Émile Girardeau in 1991. In 1997 he was honoured with the PTTI Distinguished Service Medal from the Institute of Navigation and the Tompion Gold Medal from the Worshipful Company of Clockmakers. In 1999 he received the Rabi Award from the Institute of Electrical and Electronics Engineers (IEEE). Guinot was elected a corresponding member of the Académie des sciences in 1983 and became a member of the Academia Europaea in 1988. He was appointed Chevalier de l’Ordre national du mérite and Officier des Palmes académiques.

== Selected publications ==
=== Articles ===
- Guinot, Bernard (1965). "La constante de l'aberration en astrométrie". Symposium - International Astronomical Union. 21: 125–129. doi:10.1017/S0074180900104887.
- Guinot, B. (1967). "Formation d'une échelle moyenne de temps atomique". Bull. Astron. Série 3. 2 (3): 449–464. doi:10.3406/bastr.1967.14505.
- Guinot, B. (1972). "The Chandlerian Wobble from 1900 to 1970". Astronomy and Astrophysics. 19: 207. Bibcode:1972A&A....19..207G.
- McCarthy, Dennis D.; Pilkington, John H. D., eds. (1979). "Basic problems in the kinematics of the rotation of the Earth by Bernard Guinot". IAU Symposium 82. Proceedings of the 82nd Symposium of the International Union held in San Fernando, Spain, 8–12 May 1978. Reidel. pp. 7–18. doi:10.1017/S0074180900035907. Extract with references
- Guinot, B. (1986). "L'évolution des idées dans la mesure du temps" (PDF). Séminaire de Philosophie et Mathématiques. 2: 1–18.
- Capitaine, N.; Guinot, B.; Souchay, J. (1987). "A non-rotating origin on the instantaneous equator, definition, properties and use". Celestial Mechanics. 39 (3): 283–307. doi:10.1007/BF01234311. S2CID 117695240.
- Guinot, B. (1988). "Atomic time scales for pulsar studies and other demanding applications". Astronomy and Astrophysics. 192 (1–2): 370. Bibcode:1988A&A...192..370G.
- Guinot, B.; Seidelmann, P. K. (1988). "Time scales - Their history, definition and interpretation". Astronomy and Astrophysics. 194 (1–2): 304. Bibcode:1988A&A...194..304G.
- Guinot, B.; Petit, G. (1991). "Atomic time and the rotation of pulsars". Astronomy and Astrophysics. 248: 292. Bibcode:1991A&A...248..292G.
- Guinot, B. (1997). "Application of General Relativity to Metrology (International Report)". Metrologia. 34: 261–290. doi:10.1088/0026-1394/34/3/9. S2CID 250865667.
- Capitaine, Nicole; Guinot, Bernard (1997). "Systèmes de référence en astronomie". Comptes Rendus de l'Académie des Sciences, Série IIB. 324 (11): 725–738. doi:10.1016/S1251-8069(97)83178-8.
- Guinot, B. (2000). "History of the Bureau International de l'Heure". International Astronomical Union Colloquium. 178: 175–184. doi:10.1017/S0252921100061315.
- Capitaine, N.; Guinot, B.; McCarthy, D. D. (2000). "Definition of the Celestial Ephemeris Origin and of UT1 in the International Celestial Reference Frame". Astronomy and Astrophysics. 355: 398–405. Bibcode:2000A&A...355..398C.
- Nelson, R. A.; McCarthy, D. D.; Malys, S.; Levine, J.; Guinot, B.; Fliegel, H. F.; Beard, R. L.; Bartholomew, T. R. (2001). "The leap second: its history and possible future". Metrologia. 38 (6): 509–529. Bibcode:2001Metro..38..509N. doi:10.1088/0026-1394/38/6/6. S2CID 250759447.
- Guinot, Bernard; Arias, Elisa Felicitas (2005). "Atomic time-keeping from 1955 to the present". Metrologia. 42 (3): S20–S30. Bibcode:2005Metro..42S..20G. doi:10.1088/0026-1394/42/3/S04. S2CID 122700186.

=== Books ===
- Decauz, Bernard; Guinot, Bernard (1969). Presses universitaires de France (ed.). La mesure du temps. Que sais-je? N° 97. Paris: Presses universitaires de France; 128 pages, illustrated
- Débarbat, Suzanne; Guinot, B. (1970). La méthode des hauteurs égales en astronomie. London; Paris: Gordon and Breach. ISBN 9780677502502. (This book was translated into Russian, and part of the book was translated into Chinese.)
- Audoin, Claude; Guinot, Bernard (6 September 2001). The Measurement of Time: Time, Frequency and the Atomic Clock. Cambridge University Press. ISBN 9780521003971. (French edition 1998; Russian edition 2002)
