= NGC 5778 =

Galaxy in the constellation Boötes

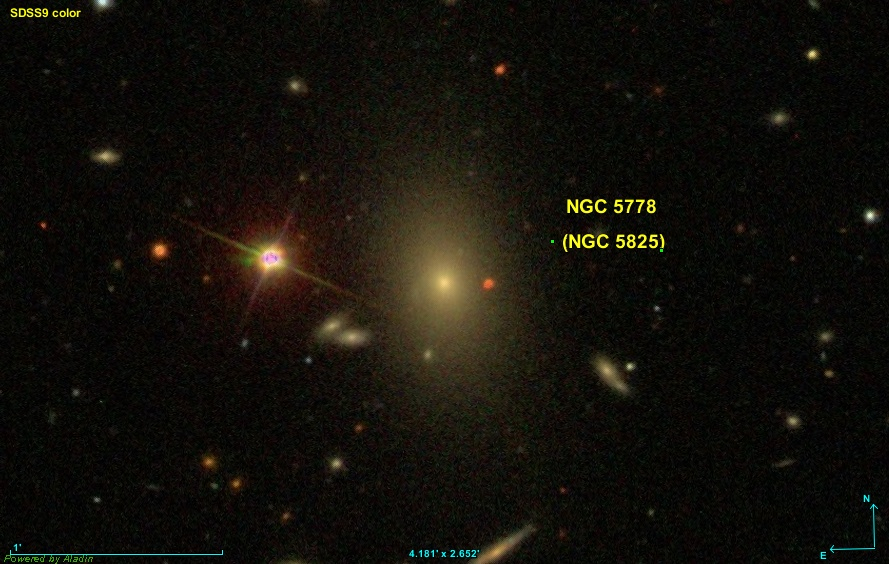
- The elliptical galaxy NGC 5778

Observation data (J2000 epoch)
- Constellation: Boötes
- Right ascension: 14^{h} 54^{m} 31.48^{s}
- Declination: +18° 38′ 32.50″
- Redshift: 0.059210
- Heliocentric radial velocity: 17,751 ± 5 km/s
- Distance: 881.5 ± 61.7 Mly (270.27 ± 18.92 Mpc)
- Group or cluster: Abell 1991
- Absolute magnitude (V): 14.3

Characteristics
- Type: cD;BrClG
- Size: ~364,000 ly (111.5 kpc) (estimated)

Other designations
- NGC 5825, UGC 9590, Abell 1991:[AAV2011] BCG, CGCG 105-066, GIN 372, PGC 53279, MCG +03-38-050

NGC 5778 is a large elliptical galaxy in the constellation of Boötes. The galaxy has a redshift of (z) 0.059 and it was first discovered by the American astronomer Lewis Swift in June 1886 who depicted it as faint and small, next to a star, and also discovered by the French astronomer Guillaume Bigourdan in May 1890. It is the brightest cluster galaxy (BCG) of the galaxy cluster, Abell 1991 and as such dominates the center.

== Description ==
NGC 5778 is a type-cD galaxy of Abell 1991. It is a radio galaxy containing a compact central radio source with a low radio power of 23.41 W Hz^{−1} and a total radio flux density estimated as 38 mJy based on observations made with the Very Large Array (VLA). It also contains a core-jet structure based on a high resolution radio map with a linear size of 8 kiloparsecs. A radio core has been detected and has a total flux density of 11.4 mJy.

The optical spectrum of the galaxy displays emission lines. The U – R and U – I color gradients of the galaxy are estimated to be -0.35 ± 0.06 and -0.23 ± 0.08 magnitudes respectively. The X-ray emission extends outwards by 180 arcseconds, with further detections of X-ray knot features located in the northern direction from its nucleus. The galaxy also has a calculated central velocity dispersion of 222 ± 8 kilometers per second with a total star formation rate that is less than 1.66 M_{☉} per year derived from its infrared luminosity. The stellar velocity dispersion is 279 ± 25 kilometers per second.
