= NGC 716 =

Spiral galaxy in the constellation Aries

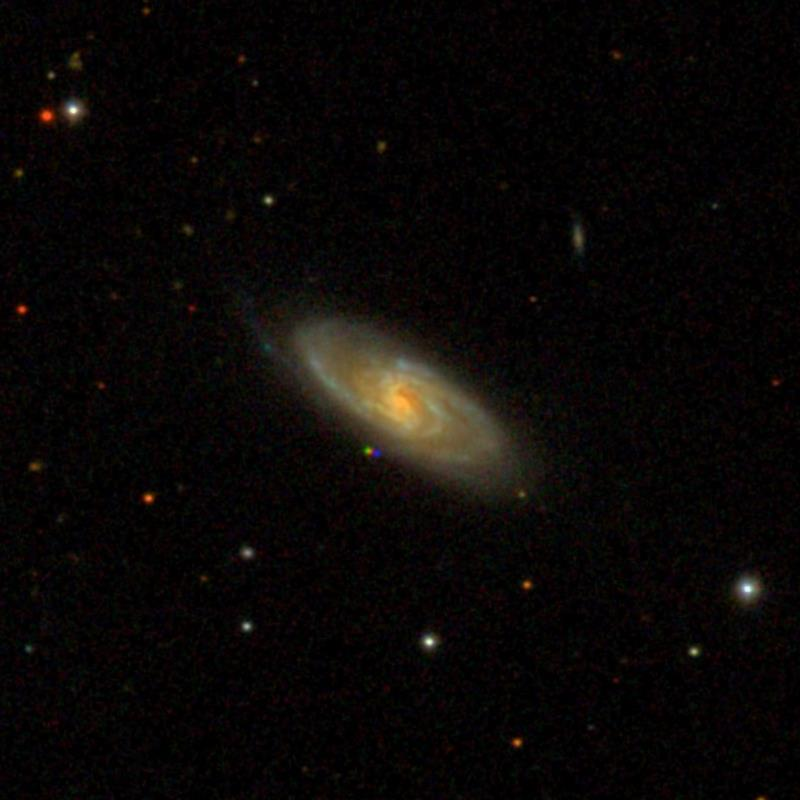
- SDSS image of NGC 716

Observation data (J2000 epoch)
- Constellation: Aries
- Right ascension: 01^{h} 52^{m} 59.65476^{s}
- Declination: +12° 42′ 30.6934″
- Redshift: 0.015409
- Heliocentric radial velocity: 4584 km/s
- Distance: 174.66 ± 7.86 Mly (53.55 ± 2.409 Mpc)
- Apparent magnitude (B): 14.0

Characteristics
- Type: SBa?

Other designations
- IC 1743, UGC 1351, MCG +02-05-054, PGC 6982

NGC 716 is a large barred spiral galaxy located in the constellation Aries, about 200 million light-years away from the Milky Way. The luminosity class of NGC 716 is I and has a large HI line. It also contains regions of ionized hydrogen. Many non-redshift measurements provide a distance of 54,023±8,169 Mpc (~176 million light years), which is within the distances calculated using the redshift value.

== History ==
NGC 716 was discovered in 1886 by American astronomer Lewis Swift using a 40.64 cm (16 inch) optical telescope that used a mirror as a light-gathering element. It was also observed by the French astronomer Guillaume Bigourdan on 1 January 1892 and was added to the Index Catalog with the code IC 1743.

== See also ==
- List of NGC objects (1–1000)
- Lists of galaxies
