= Courtès =

Courtès is a surname. Notable people with the surname include:

- Alex Courtès, French artist and video director
- Célestine Ketcha Courtès (born 1964), Cameroonian politician
- Georges Courtès (1925–2019), French astronomer
