= NGC 398 =

Lenticular galaxy in the constellation Pisces

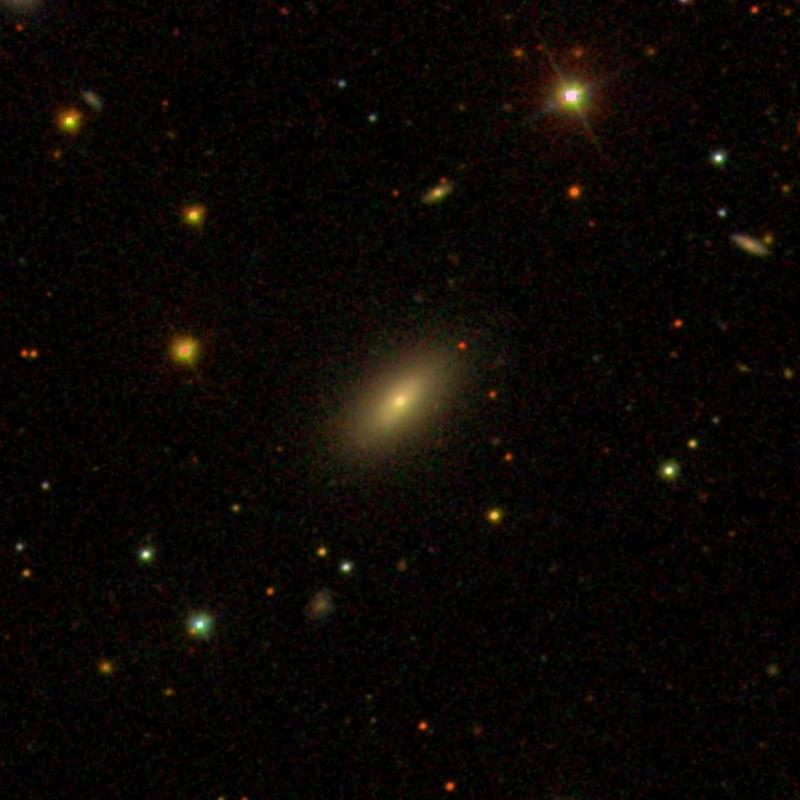
- SDSS image of NGC 398

Observation data (J2000 epoch)
- Constellation: Pisces
- Right ascension: 01^{h} 08^{m} 53.7^{s}
- Declination: +32° 30′ 52″
- Redshift: 0.016605
- Heliocentric radial velocity: 4,978 km/s
- Apparent magnitude (V): 15.4

Characteristics
- Type: S0
- Apparent size (V): 0.3' × 0.2'

Other designations
- CGCG 501-100, MCG +05-03-065, 2MASX J01085369+3230516, 2MASXi J0108536+323052, PGC 4090.

NGC 398 is a lenticular galaxy located in the constellation Pisces. It was discovered on October 28, 1886, by Guillaume Bigourdan. It was described by Dreyer as "very faint, very small, stellar."

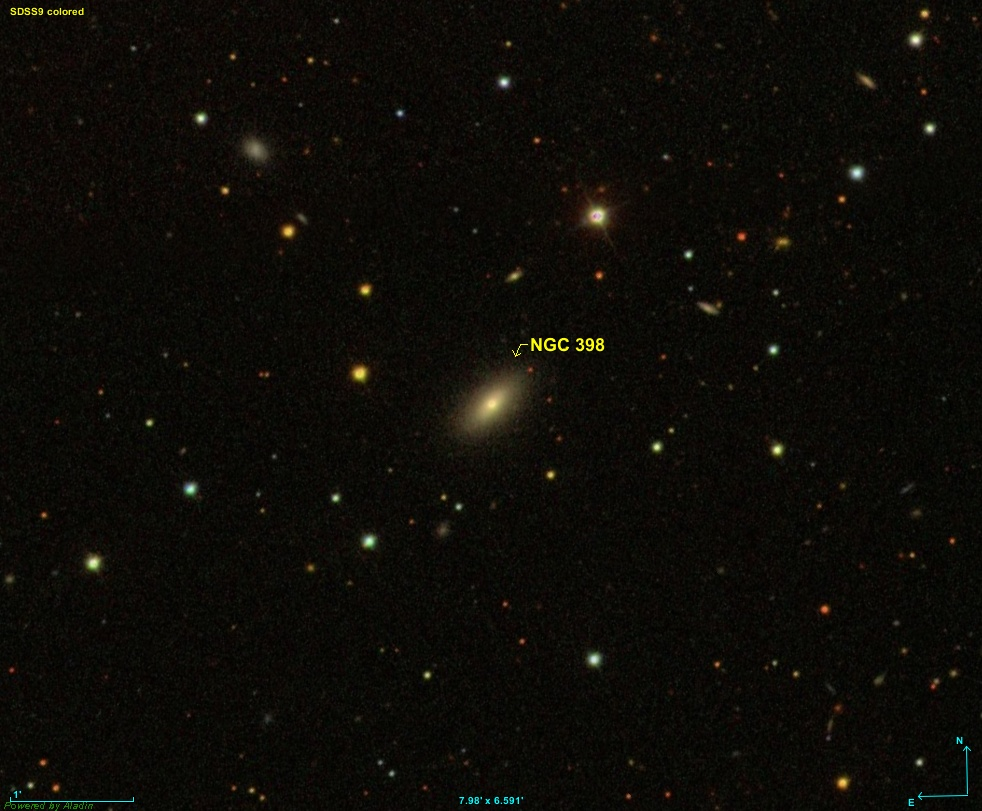
NGC 398 (SDSS)
