= Edith Alice Müller =

Swiss astronomer (1918-1995)

- Born: 5 February 1918; Madrid, Spain
- Died: 24 July 1995 (aged 77); Spain
- Education: ETH Zurich; University of Zurich (PhD)
- Scientific career
- Workplaces: University of Zurich; University of Michigan; University of Neuchâtel; University of Geneva
- Thesis: Application of Group Theory and Structural Analysis to the Moorish Adornments of the Alhambra in Granada (1943)

Edith Alice Müller (5 February 1918 – 24 July 1995) was a Spanish-Swiss mathematician and astronomer. In 2018, the Swiss Society for Astronomy and Astrophysics (SSAA) launched the annual Edith Alice Müller Award for outstanding astronomy PhD theses in Switzerland.

== Early life and education ==
Müller was born in Madrid, and attended the German School there before studying at ETH Zurich. She completed her PhD in mathematics in 1943 at the University of Zurich with the title "Application of Group Theory and Structural Analysis to the Moorish Adornments of the Alhambra in Granada". This was a key piece of literature in the study of Islamic design, at a time when many western historians assumed Islamic design had no base in science and was a simple craft; her research was not to absorbed into art historical literature until the 1980s.

== Career ==
She held research positions at astronomical observatories in Zurich (1946–1951), the University of Michigan (1952–1954 and 1955–1962), and Basel (1954–1955), before becoming an assistant professor at the University of Neuchâtel in 1962. In 1972 she moved to the University of Geneva as a full professor. She was principally involved in the study of solar physics and was the first woman to be appointed General Secretary of the International Astronomical Union, a title she held from 1976 to 1979. She was awarded the Prix Jules Janssen of the Société astronomique de France in 1994.

== Bibliography ==
- Chmielewski, Yves (1998). "Edith Alice Müller (1918–1995)". In Appenzeller, I.; et al. (eds.). Remembering Edith Alice Müller. Astrophysics and Space Science Library. Vol. 222. Dordrecht: Springer Netherlands. pp. 6–8. doi:10.1007/978-94-011-5173-3_2. ISBN 978-94-010-6175-9.
- Chorbachi, W.K. (1989). "In the Tower of Babel: Beyond symmetry in islamic design". Computers & Mathematics with Applications. 17 (4–6): 751–789. doi:10.1016/0898-1221(89)90260-5. MR 0994228.
- Riedtmann, Christine (2010). "Wege von Frauen: Mathematikerinnen in der Schweiz" [Paths of Women Mathematicians in Switzerland] (PDF). In Colbois, Bruno; et al. (eds.). math.ch/100: Schweizerische Mathematische Gesellschaft – Société Mathématique Suisse – Swiss Mathematical Society 1910. Berlin: EMS Press. p. 12. doi:10.4171/089-1/18. ISBN 978-3-03719-089-0.
