= Sheperd S. Doeleman =

American astrophysicist

- Born: Sheperd Nacheman; 1967 (age 58–59); Wilsele, Belgium
- Awards: Bruno Rossi Prize (2020); Breakthrough Prize in Fundamental Physics (2020); Henry Draper Medal (2021); Prix Georges Lemaître (2023)
- Scientific career
- Fields: Astrophysics
- Institutions: Massachusetts Institute of Technology, Max Planck Institute for Radio Astronomy, Center for Astrophysics | Harvard & Smithsonian
- Thesis: Imaging Active Galactic Nuclei with 3mm-VLBI (1995)
- Doctoral advisors: Alan E.E. Rogers and Bernard F. Burke

Sheperd "Shep" S. Doeleman (born 1967) is an American astrophysicist. His research focuses on imaging supermassive black holes with sufficient resolution to directly observe the event horizon. He is a senior research fellow at the Harvard–Smithsonian Center for Astrophysics and the Founding Director of the Event Horizon Telescope (EHT) project. He led the international team of researchers that produced the first directly observed image of a black hole.

Doeleman was named one of Time magazine's 100 Most Influential People of 2019.

== Background ==
He was born in Wilsele in Belgium to American parents. The family returned to the United States a few months later, and he grew up in Portland, Oregon. He was later adopted by his stepfather Nelson Doeleman.

== Career and research ==
He earned a B.A. at Reed College in 1986 and then spent a year in Antarctica working on multiple space-science experiments at McMurdo Station. He then went on to earn a PhD in astrophysics at the Massachusetts Institute of Technology (MIT) in 1995; his dissertation was titled Imaging Active Galactic Nuclei with 3mm-VLBI. He has worked at the Max Planck Institute for Radio Astronomy in Bonn and returned to MIT in 1995, where he later became assistant director of the Haystack Observatory.

His research has focused in particular on problems that require ultra-high resolving power. He is known for heading the group of over 200 researchers at research institutions in several countries that produced the first aperture synthesis image of a black hole.

== Selected publications ==
- Doeleman S.S., et al. (2008). Event-horizon-scale structure in the supermassive black hole candidate at the Galactic Centre. Nature 455: 78–80.
- Doeleman S.S., et al. (2012). Jet-Launching Structure Resolved Near the Supermassive Black Hole in M87. Science 338: 355–358.
- Doeleman S.S., et al. (2009). Detecting Flaring Structures in Sagittarius A* with High-Frequency VLBI. Astrophys.J 695: 59–74.

== Awards ==
- Guggenheim Fellow, 2012
- 2020 Breakthrough Prize in Fundamental Physics (one share; prize shared equally among 347 scientist of the EHT)
- 2020 Lancelot M. Berkeley - New York Community Trust Prize for Meritorious Work in Astronomy,
- 2020 Bruno Rossi Prize, to Doeleman and the EHT
- 2021 Henry Draper Medal, shared with Heino Falcke
- 2023 Prix Georges Lemaître
