= Dominique Lambert =

Belgian philosopher and science historian

Dominique baron Lambert (born 10 September 1960 in Namur) is a Belgian philosopher of science, ethicist, and historian of science.

== Education and career ==
At the Université catholique de Louvain (UCL), Lambert graduated with an undergraduate degree in theoretical physics in 1984, a master's degree in philosophy in 1986. a Ph.D. in physics in 1988, and a Ph.D. in philosophy in 1996. He became a full professor at the Université de Namur (in the faculty of sciences and the faculty of letters) and has held several visiting professorships. He is also a professor of logic and philosophy of nature at the Diocesan Seminary of Namur.

In the history of science, he has an international reputation as the author of the first detailed biography of the scientist Georges Lemaître. In 2000 Lessius published the biography in the original French. In 2015 an English translation was published in Kraków by Copernicus Center Press. Lambert is also known for his works (translated into several languages) on the relationship between science and theology. He has done research in ethics dealing with the use of autonomous robots for military purposes. He is a consultant for the Political Council for Culture in Rome.

In 1999 Lambert received the Prix Georges Lemaître, jointly with the astrophysicist Jean-Pierre Luminet, for their work analyzing Lemaître's scientific and religious writings. In 2000 he received the Prize of the European Society for the Study of Science and Theology (ESSSAT). He was elected s a member of the Académie royale de Belgique in 2005. In July 2016, Dominique Lambert was ennobled as a baron by Philippe of Belgium, King of the Belgians.

== Selected publications ==
- Dominique Lambert, Au cœur des sciences: Une métaphysique rigoureuse, Paris, Beauchesne, 1996
- Dominique Lambert & Jacques Demaret, Le principe anthropique – l’homme est-il le centre de l’univers ?, Dunod, 1997
- Dominique Lambert, Sciences et théologie: Les figures d'un dialogue, Lessius, 1999
- Dominique Lambert, Un atome d'univers – la vie et l’œuvre de Georges Lemaître, Lessius, 2000
- Dominique Lambert & René Rezsöhazy, Comment les pattes viennent au serpent : Essai sur l'étonnante plasticité du vivant, Flammarion, 2004
- Dominique Lambert & Jacques Reisse, Charles Darwin et Georges Lemaître, une improbable mais passionnante rencontre, Académie royale de Belgique, 2008
