= Prix Jules Janssen =

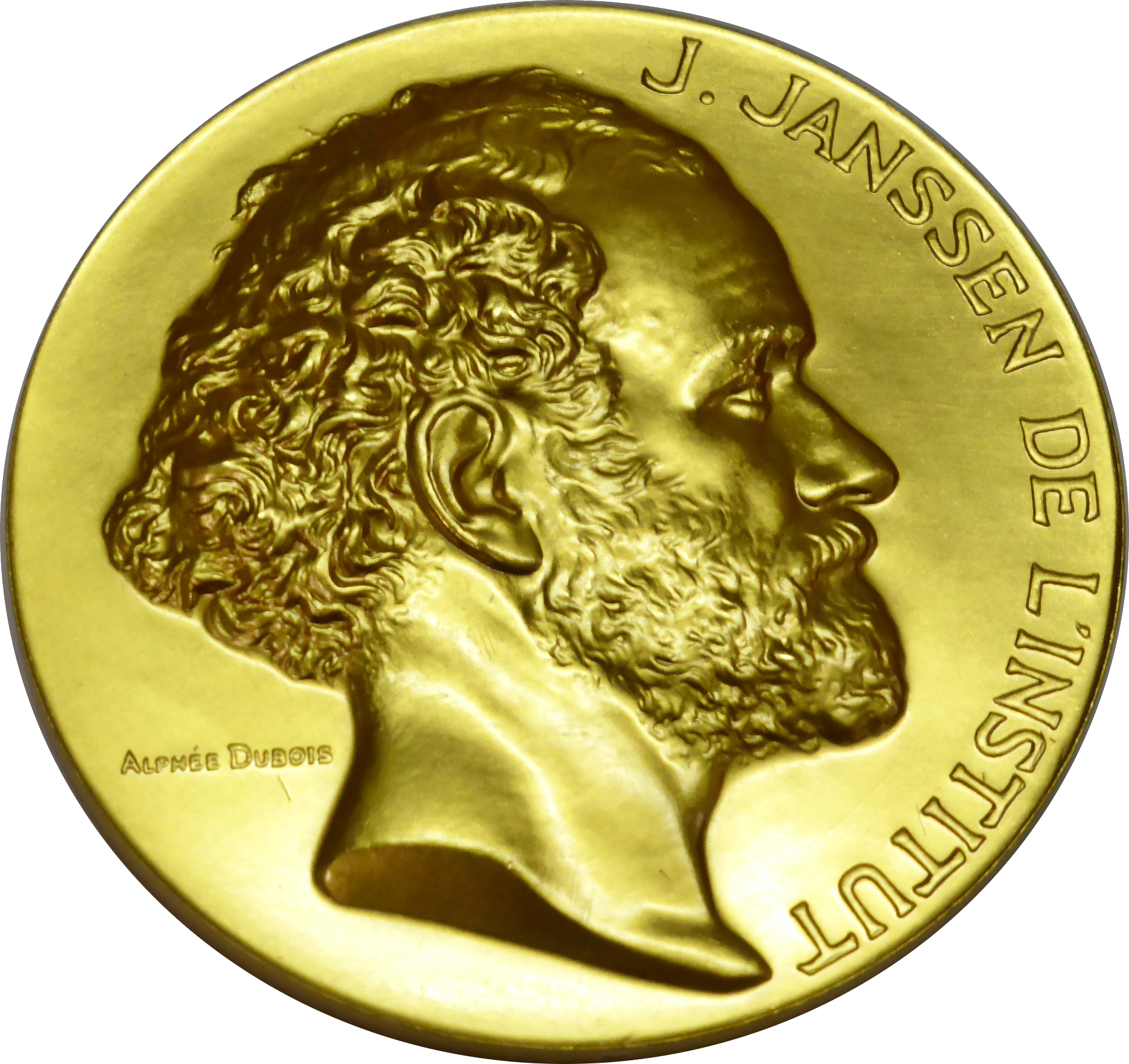
- Awarded for: Outstanding scientific work in astronomy as well as for contribution to public appreciation of astronomy. Awarded to both French and non-French astronomers.
- Country: France
- Presented by: Société Astronomique de France (SAF)
- Rewards: A golden medallion with an embossed image of Jules Janssen facing right in profile. To the right of his face is the text "J. JANSSEN DE L’INSTITUT". To the left is the engraver’s name (ALPHÉE DUBOIS) in smaller characters. Reverse : a crown of olive branches and stars; PRIX J.JANSSEN on the top; the laureate’s name and the year in the middle.
- First award: 1897; continuously awarded except for during the two World wars.
- Website: saf-astronomie.fr/en-janssen-prize/

The Prix Jules Janssen is the highest award of the Société astronomique de France (SAF), the French astronomical society.

This annual prize is given to a professional French astronomer or to an astronomer of another nationality in recognition of astronomical work in general, or for services rendered to Astronomy. The first recipient of the prize was Camille Flammarion, the founder of the Société astronomique de France, in 1897. The prize has been continuously awarded since then with the exception of the two World Wars. Non-French recipients have come from various countries including the United States, the United Kingdom, Canada, Switzerland, the Netherlands, Germany, Belgium, Sweden, Italy, Spain, Hungary, India, the former Czechoslovakia, and the former Soviet Union.

It was established by the French astronomer Pierre Jules César Janssen (known as Jules Janssen) during his tenure as president of SAF from 1895 to 1897. Janssen announced the creation of the new prize at a meeting of the Société Astronomique de France on 2 December 1896.

The medal was designed in 1896 by the Parisian engraver Alphée Dubois (1831–1905). It is minted by the Monnaie de Paris.

This prize is distinct from the Janssen Medal (created in 1886), which is awarded by the French Academy of Sciences and also named for Janssen.

== Laureates ==
- 1897 – Camille Flammarion
- 1898 – Samuel Pierpont Langley
- 1899 – Auguste Charlois
- 1900 – Pierre Puiseux
- 1901 – Joseph Joachim Landerer, Thomas David Anderson, and Henri Chrétien
- 1902 – Sylvie Camille Flammarion
- 1903 – Michel Giacobini
- 1904 – Percival Lowell
- 1905 – Josep Comas Solà
- 1906 – Edward Emerson Barnard
- 1907 – Milan Rastislav Štefánik
- 1908 – Edward Charles Pickering
- 1909 – William Henry Pickering
- 1910 – Philip Herbert Cowell and Andrew Crommelin
- 1911 – Jean Bosler
- 1912 – Max Wolf
- 1913 – Alphonse Borrelly
- 1914 – Annibale Riccò
- 1915 – no award
- 1916 – no award
- 1917 – George Ellery Hale
- 1918 – Georges Raymond
- 1919 – Guillaume Bigourdan
- 1920 – Henri-Alexandre Deslandres
- 1921 – René Jarry-Desloges
- 1922 – Albert Abraham Michelson
- 1923 – Aymar de la Baume Pluvinel
- 1924 – George Willis Ritchey
- 1925 – Eugène Michel Antoniadi
- 1926 – Walter Sydney Adams
- 1927 – Gustave-Auguste Ferrié
- 1928 – Arthur Stanley Eddington
- 1929 – Charles Fabry
- 1930 – Robert Esnault-Pelterie
- 1931 – Albert Einstein
- 1932 – Bernard Lyot
- 1933 – Harlow Shapley
- 1934 – Willem de Sitter
- 1935 – Ernest Esclangon
- 1936 – Georges Lemaître
- 1937 – Giorgio Abetti
- 1938 – Jules Baillaud
- 1939 – Albert Arnulf
- 1940 – no award
- 1941 – no award
- 1942 – no award
- 1943 – no award
- 1944 – no award
- 1945 – Harold Spencer Jones
- 1946 – Charles Maurain, Fernand Baldet
- 1947 – Jan Hendrik Oort
- 1948 – Lucien Henri d'Azambuja
- 1949 – Bertil Lindblad
- 1950 – André-Louis Danjon
- 1951 – Gerard Peter Kuiper
- 1952 – Frederick John Marrian Stratton
- 1953 – André Couder
- 1954 – Otto Struve
- 1955 – André Lallemand
- 1956 – Viktor Ambartsumian
- 1957 – Daniel Chalonge
- 1958 – Pol Swings
- 1959 – Charles Fehrenbach
- 1960 – Albert Edward Whitford
- 1961 – Jean Coulomb
- 1962 – Otto Heckmann
- 1963 – Jean Dufay
- 1964 – Guglielmo Righini
- 1965 – Jean-François Denisse
- 1966 – Marcel Gilles Jozef Minnaert
- 1967 – Jean-Claude Pecker
- 1968 – Karl-Otto Kiepenheuer
- 1969 – Nicolas Stoyko
- 1970 – Martin Schwarzschild
- 1971 – Jean Rösch
- 1972 – Donald Harry Sadler
- 1973 – Evry Léon Schatzman
- 1974 – Walter Ernst Fricke
- 1975 – Pierre Lacroute
- 1976 – Donald Howard Menzel
- 1977 – James Lequeux
- 1978 – Adriaan Blaauw
- 1979 – Jean Kovalevsky
- 1980 – Lyman Spitzer
- 1981 – Georges Courtès
- 1982 – Peter van de Kamp
- 1983 – Jacques Lévy and Charles Bertaud
- 1984 – Cornelis de Jager
- 1985 – Paul Muller
- 1986 – Marcel Golay
- 1987 – Jean Delhaye
- 1988 – Gérard de Vaucouleurs
- 1989 – Bernard Guinot
- 1990 – Herbert Friedman
- 1991 – Pierre Mein
- 1992 – Luboš Perek
- 1993 – Audouin Dollfus
- 1994 – Edith Alice Müller
- 1995 – François Roddier
- 1996 – Michael Perryman
- 1997 – Elizabeth Nesme and Serge Koutchmy
- 1998 – Michel Mayor
- 1999 – Pierre Léna
- 2000 – Reinhard Genzel
- 2001 – Roger Cayrel
- 2002 – Armand H. Delsemme
- 2003 – Jean-Paul Zahn
- 2004 – Jayant Narlikar
- 2005 – Roger-Maurice Bonnet
- 2006 – Owen Gingerich
- 2007 – Thérèse Encrenaz and Paul Couteau
- 2008 – Jan Stenflo
- 2009 – Catherine Cesarsky
- 2010 – Carlton Pennypacker
- 2011 – Roger Ferlet
- 2012 – Jay Pasachoff
- 2013 – Suzanne Débarbat
- 2014 – Rafael Rebolo López
- 2015 – Suzy Collin-Zahn
- 2016 – John Leibacher
- 2017 – Françoise Combes
- 2018 – Alessandro Morbidelli
- 2019 – Hubert Reeves
- 2020 – Ewine van Dishoeck
- 2021 – Jean-Pierre Luminet
- 2022 – Jocelyn Bell Burnell
- 2023 – Bruno Sicardy
- 2024 – Ruth Durrer
- 2025 – Jean-Philippe Uzan

== See also ==
- List of astronomy awards
- Prizes named after people
