= Nicolas Stoyko =

Ukrainian-French astronomer (1894–1976)

- Born: May 2, 1894; Odesa
- Died: September 14, 1976 (aged 82); Menton
- Citizenship: Russia; France
- Education: Imperial Novossiya University; University of Paris
- Awards: Prix Lalande (1930); Prix Jules Janssen (1969)
- Scientific career
- Fields: Astronomy
- Workplaces: Paris Observatory
- Doctoral advisor: Ernest Esclangon

Nicolas Stoyko or Nikolaï Mikhaïlovitch Stoyko (Russian: Николай Михайлович Стойко, Nikolaï Mikhaïlovitch Stoïko; Ukrainian: Микола Михайлович Стойко, Mykola Mikhaïlovitch Stoïko, 1894–1976) was a Ukrainian-French astronomer, known for his research on the precise measurement of time and the rate of rotation of planet Earth.

== Biography ==
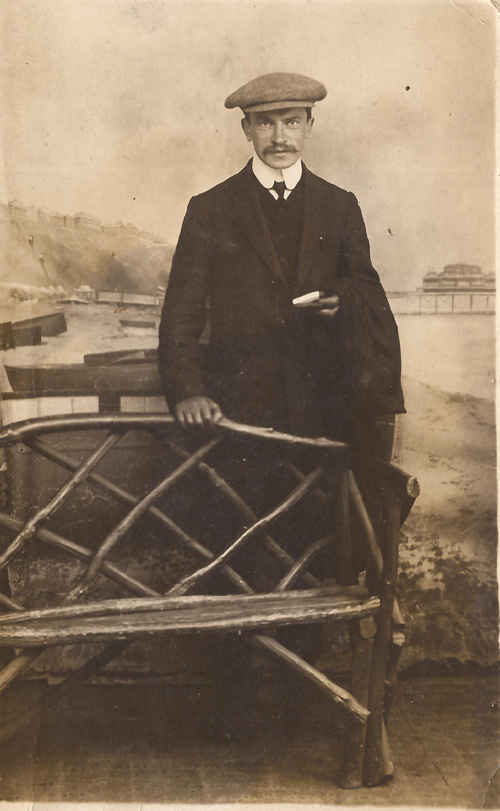
Stokyo's mentor, Aleksandr Orlov (photograph 1912)

Stoyko studied at the Imperial Novorossiya University (now Odesa University) before working from 1914 to 1916 as a volunteer at the Odesa Astronomical Observatory, directed at the time by Aleksandr Yakovlevich Orlov. After graduating with a degree in mathematical sciences in 1916, Stoyko served in the Russian army from 1916 to 1918. He was certified as agrégé de mathématiques in 1920. Because of the chaos caused by the Russian Civil War, Stoyko was unemployed and immigrated to Bulgaria to find work. For three years, he taught at a boys' secondary school (i.e., lyceum) in Pleven. However, he had to leave after the 1923 Bulgarian coup d'état and requested asylum in France. On the recommendation of Orlov, who had studied at the Sorbonne, Stoyko was appointed to a position at the Paris Observatory in the Bureau International de l'Heure (BIH). He became a naturalized French citizen in 1930 and earned a doctorate from the University of Paris in 1931.

Gustave-Auguste Ferrié's research on the difficulty specific to radio-electric transmissions of time signals had shown, as early as 1910, the need to create an organization responsible for unifying the time at the international level. In 1913, on the initiative of Guillaume Bigourdan, president of the Bureau des longitudes, an international convention was held in Paris. At the convention, held from the 20th to the 25th of October 1913, representatives from 26 countries approved the creation of a Bureau International de l'Heure (BIH) installed in the premises of the Paris Observatory. Nicolas Stoyko, employed in this bureau since 1924, took over its management from 1942 to 1964, as the successor to Armand Lambert (1880–1944). When WW II started in 1939, the employees of the Paris Observatory were evacuated from the capital. Only services that had international obligations remained in Paris. Among such services was BIH. BIH's pendulum clock was moved to an underground shelter at a depth of 28 meters. Acknowledgments addressed to Stoyk contained in the annual reports of the Paris Observatory indicate that during WW II he lived in the BIH office to ensure its continuous operation. Nicolas Stoyko and his wife Anna were both astronomers and frequently collaborated. The couple worked at the BIH and retired together.

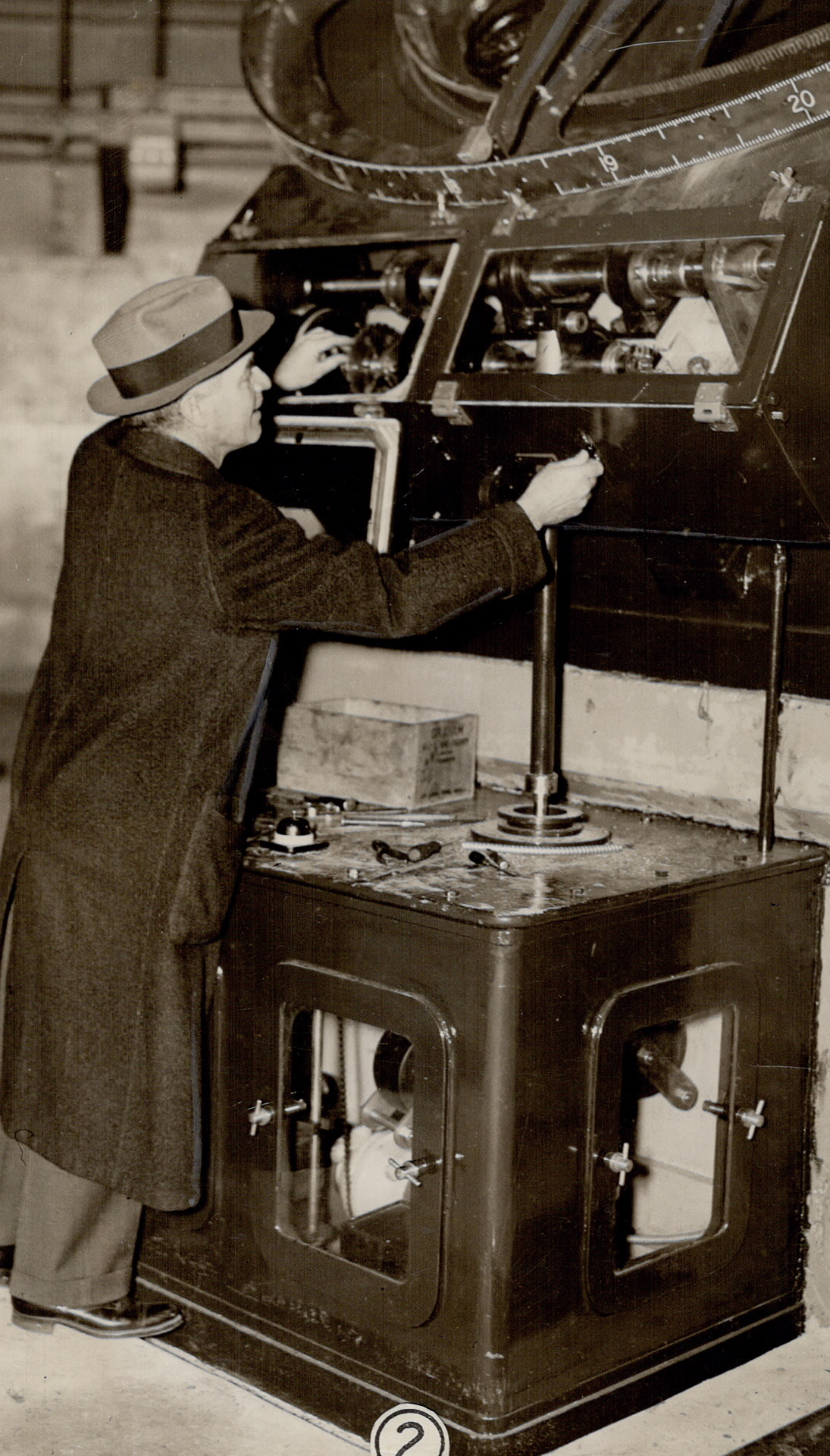
The reference clock of the David Dunlap Observatory (1935).

For the synchronization of clocks, two astronomical standards were used until 1935:

- tracking the movement of the vernal point, which defines sidereal time;
- a measurement of time based on the apparent movement of the Sun, and which makes it possible to define the average solar time.

These astral movements were timed at different points on the globe by mechanical instruments derived from the Repsold pendulum. Time radio signals made it possible to compare the clocks of the various observatories of the globe several times a day.

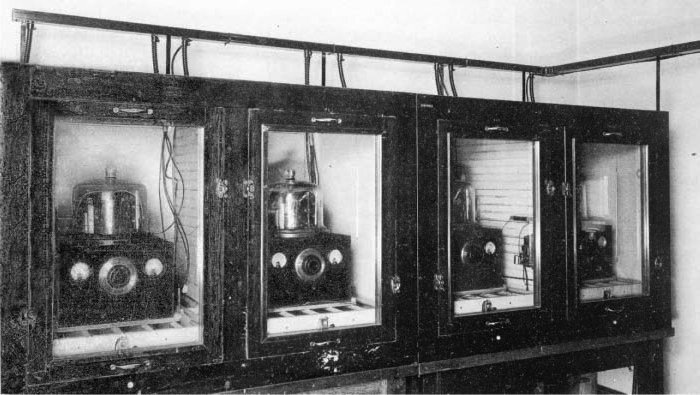
Four standard oscillators at 100 kHz from the National Institute of Standards and Technology (1929). Placed in isothermal enclosures (glass bells), their relative frequency drift was less than 10^{−7}, or roughly 1 second in 4 months.

In the early 1930s, the first quartz clocks appeared, developed at Bell Laboratories. A key step had been Walter Guyton Cady's study of the resonance of piezoelectric crystals, which are more stable in temperature than that of steel bimetallic strips; then the simplification of the Cady oscillators by G. W. Pierce. The first quartz clocks, based on the excitation of a crystal by an alternating electric voltage, used lamp electronics: their size was that of a refrigerator (with a volume of roughly .5 cubic meter); but they allowed a timing regularity of the order of 10 microseconds between two equinoxes.

Equipped with the recordings made with these new clocks located at various places on planet Earth, Stoyko, simultaneously with the German astronomers Adolf Scheibe (1895–1958) and Udo Adelsberger (1904–1992), scientifically described, between 1935 and 1937, a seasonal variation of the daily speed of the rotation of the Earth, which lengthens or shortens the day by 4 milliseconds per decade. The rotation of planet Earth was therefore found to be not only very slightly slowing down over decades, but even irregular from one part of the year to another part of the year. Thus, for the year 1937, the earth had turned slower in the northern spring and in the beginning of the summer, but faster in autumn. The difference in day length between the two extremes is of the order of 1.2 milliseconds.

This variation, hitherto unsuspected, was added to the secular variations due to the movement of the tides, known since Newton, but whose precise evaluation had taken two centuries, and which explains a lengthening of the day of 1.5 milliseconds per century. Stoyko and his contemporaries attributed these newly discovered irregularities in the Earth's rotation to the displacement of the atmospheric and mantle masses of the globe, which makes them unpredictable. The Earth's rotation was therefore recognized as being unsuitable for precisely defining time. This recognition of Earth's irregular rotation led to the introduction the ephemeris time scale based on the revolution of the Earth around the Sun. There was further improvement with the introduction of Temps Atomique International (TAI) based on the frequency of a cesium atomic standard.

== Awards and honours ==
France's Académie des sciences awarded him the Prix Lalande in 1930 and the Prix Jules Janssen in 1969. He was elected in 1938 a corresponding member of the Polish Academy of Sciences and in 1952 a corresponding member of the Bureau des longitudes. He was appointed Chevalier of the Order of the Légion d'honneur.

== Selected publications ==
- N. Stoyko, Sur la précision de la détermination de l'heure et sur les moyens de l'améliorer (1931), Imprimerie nationale, Paris
- N. Stoyko, Sur la mesure du temps et les problèmes qui s'y rattachent (1931) Paris : Gauthier-Villars et Cie; (doctoral dissertation, University of Paris)
- N. Stoyko, Étude d'une lunette méridienne installée à l'Observatoire de Paris (1931)
- A. Lambert, Madame P[ierre] Dubois, and N. Stoyko, La Deuxième Opération internationale des longitudes, octobre-novembre 1933 (1938); [published by l'Union astronomique et géodésique-géophysique internationale, éd. Hermann ]; 132 pages
- N. Stoyko, Influence des tremblements de terre sur les pendules (1943), Gauthier-Villars et Cie, Paris
- N. Stoyko, Les Fluctuations saisonnières de la rotation de la Terre (1951), Palais des Académies, Bruxelles; 15 pages
- N. Stoyko and Madame P[ierre] Dubois, La Deuxième Opération internationale des longitudes : octobre-novembre 1933, résultats, conclusions, vitesse apparente de propagation des ondes radioélectriques (1952), Association internationale de géodésie, Paris
- N. Stoyko, Rapport succinct sur les travaux russes d'astronomie fondamentale (1955)
- N. M. Stokyo-Radilenko, Stoyko-Radilenko, N. M. (1969). "Memoirs of the Novorossijsk University and the Odessa Astronomical Observatory". Istoriko-Astronomicheskie Issledovaniya. 10: 245–250. Bibcode:1969IAIss..10..245S.
