= Prix Georges Lemaître =

Award created in 1995

The Prix Georges Lemaître is an award created in 1995, in celebration of the centenary of the birth in 1894 of Georges Lemaître. The Association des Anciens et Amis de l'Université catholique de Louvain (Association of the Alumni and Friends of the Université catholique de Louvain) initiated the award, as well as the Fondation Georges Lemaître (Georges Lemaître Foundation). The prize, endowed with 25,000 euros as of 2003, is awarded every two years to a scientist who has made a remarkable contribution to développement et à la diffusion des connaissances dans les domaines de la cosmologie, de l'astronomie, de l'astrophysique, de la géophysique, ou de la recherche spatiale (development and dissemination of knowledge in the fields of cosmology, astronomy, astrophysics, geophysics, or space science). The winner is chosen by an international jury of scientists, chaired by the rector of the Université catholique de Louvain.

== List of recipients ==
- 1995 — Philip James Edwin Peebles, astrophysicist and cosmologist
- 1997 — Jean-Claude Duplessy, geochemist and climatologist
- 1999 — Jean-Pierre Luminet, astrophysist, and Dominique Lambert, philosopher of science
- 2001 — Kurt Lambeck, geophysicist
- 2003 — Alain Hubert, explorer and climatologist
- 2005 — Édouard Bard, climatologist
- 2007 — Susan Solomon, atmospheric chemist and climatologist
- 2009 — Jean Kovalevsky, astronomer
- 2010 — André Berger, climatologist
- 2012 — Michael Heller, cosmologist
- 2015 — Anny Cazenave, geophysicist, and Jean-Philippe Uzan, theoretical physicist and cosmologist
- 2017 — Kip Thorne, theoretical physicist
- 2019 — George F. R. Ellis, theoretical physicist and cosmologist
- 2021 — hiatus due to COVID-19 pandemic
- 2023 — Sheperd S. Doeleman, astrophysicist
