= Roger-Maurice Bonnet =

French astrophysicist and academic (1937–2026)

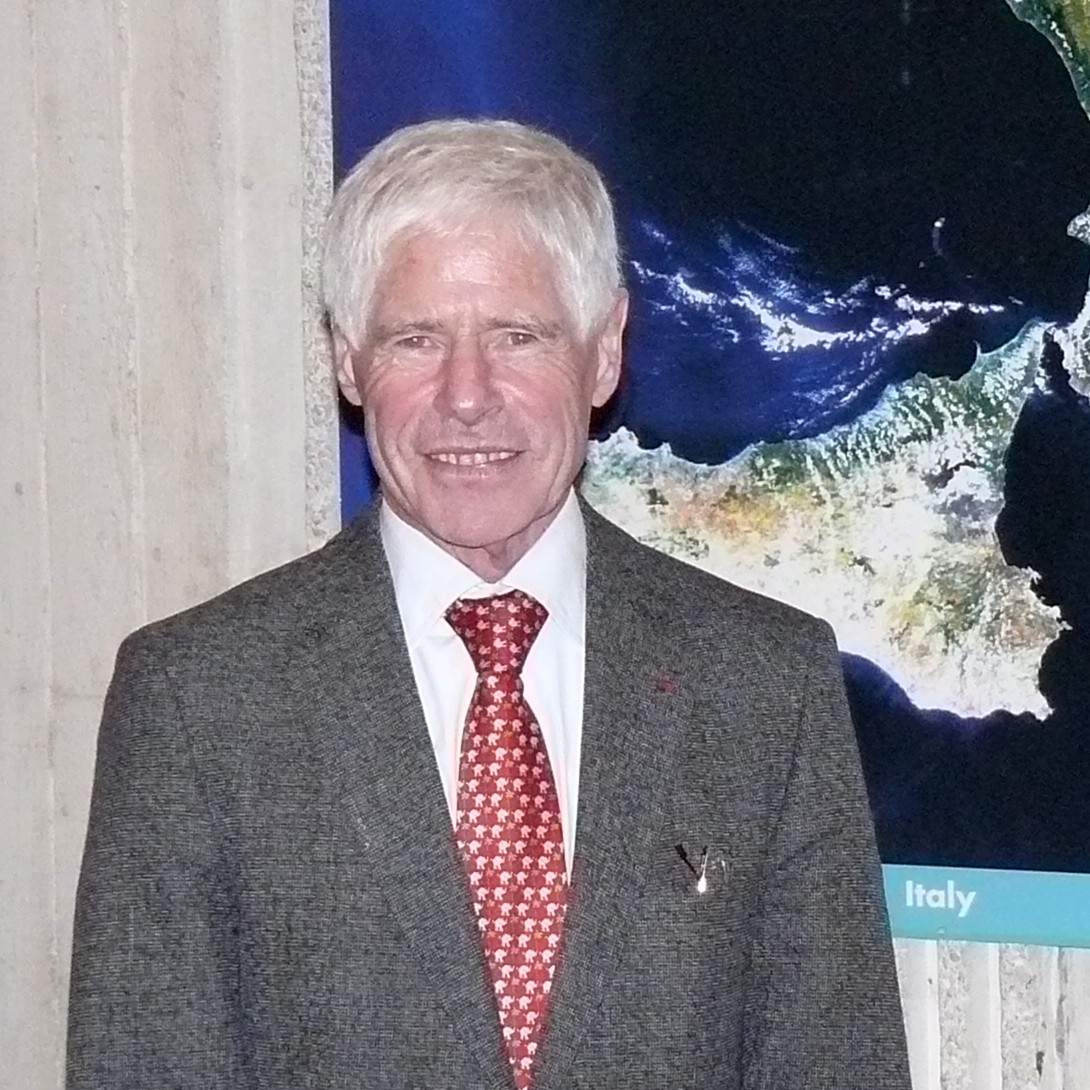
- Bonnet in 2009
- Born: 23 December 1937; Dourdan, France
- Died: 19 January 2026 (aged 88); Clermont-Ferrand, France
- Education: University of Paris (DND)
- Occupations: Astrophysicist, academic

Roger-Maurice Bonnet (French: [ʁoʒe moʁis bɔnɛ]; 23 December 1937 – 19 January 2026) was a French astrophysicist, space physicist, and scientific leader.

== Life and career ==
Born in Dourdan on 23 December 1937, Bonnet graduated from the University of Paris, completing his doctoral thesis in 1968. From 1969 to 1983, he founded and directed the Laboratoire de physique stellaire et planétaire, where he developed the ultraviolet imaging spectrometer for the NASA heliophysics satellite OSO-8, launched on 21 June 1975. He also developed a Transition Region Camera for Black Brant rockets in 1979, 1980, and 1982. He also contributed to the development of the Halley Multicolour Camera with the Max Planck Institute for Solar System Research for the Giotto. From 1978 to 1980, he was head of the Committee of the Scientific Council of the European Space Agency (ESA). He would later play a key role in the development of replicas for lost satellites and the creation of the Living Space Programme. From 2001 to 2006, he headed the ESA's Aurora program, which gave way to the ExoMars program.

Bonnet died on 19 January 2026, at the age of 88.

== Awards and honors ==
- Officer of the Legion of Honour (1990)
- Prix Jules Janssen (2005) awarded by the Société astronomique de France
