= Sylvie Pétiaux =

Sylvie Pétiaux Flammarion
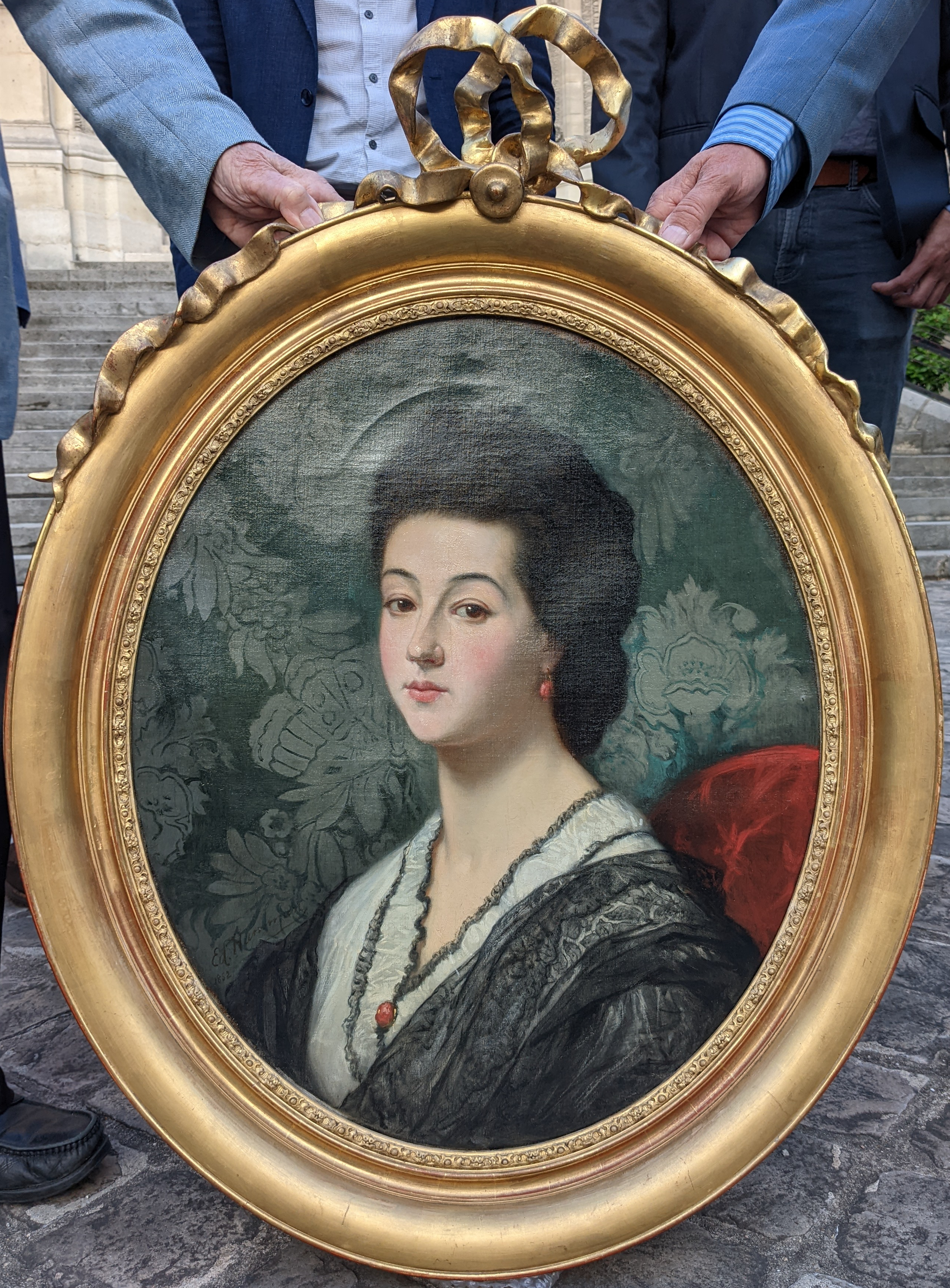
- (age 26)
- Born: Sylvie Pétiaux-Hugo; November 28, 1836; Valenciennes, Nord, France
- Died: February 23, 1919 (aged 82); 14th arrondissement of Paris
- Other name: Sylvio Hugo (pen name)
- Occupations: feminist; pacifist; writer
- Spouses: Esprit Mathieu (m. 1859; died 1873); Camille Flammarion (m. 1874)
- Awards: Prix Jules Janssen (1902)

Sylvie Pétiaux (née, Pétiaux-Hugo; after first marriage, Mathieu; after second marriage, Flammarion; pen name, Sylvio Hugo; November 28, 1836 – February 23, 1919) was a French feminist and pacifist. She was the wife of the astronomer, Camille Flammarion, and collaborator with him in much of his astronomical work. She was a Prix Jules Janssen laureate in 1902.

== Biography ==
Sylvie Pétiaux-Hugo was born in Valenciennes, Nord on November 28, 1836. She was the daughter of Casimir-Joseph Pétiaux (1807-1883) and Marie-Stéphanie Hugo (1811-1892). She claimed to be related to Victor Hugo, but this seems to be an invention. Her sister was Zélie-Rosalie Pétiaux (1838-1873), an opera singer, wife of Count Mikhaïl Illarionovitch Moussine-Pouchkine (1836-1915), and her niece was Olga Illarionova Moussine-Pouchkine (1865-1947), a violinist with the Russian imperial theaters, who became the master of a Martinist lodge in Russia. Camille Flammarion will also be linked to Gérard Encausse, known as "Papus".

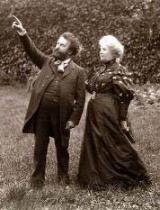
Camille and Sylvie Flammarion

She married Esprit Mathieu (1810-1873) on December 31, 1859 in Paris. In 1874, she married the astronomer, Camille Flammarion (Note: According to Shaw (1925), Pétiaux married Flammarion in 1878.) with whom she had been having an affair for several years. He took her in a balloon for their honeymoon.

Pétiaux shared the same interest for astronomy as her husband. She remained for many years a devoted and assiduous collaborator in all of his work. It is at her initiative that the Prix des Dames, rewarding eminent services rendered to the Société astronomique de France, was established. In Paris, Pétiaux hosted the popular salon des étoiles (star exhibitions).

In 1889, she was the founder and active promoter of an association of women advocating peace and disarmament, L'Association la Paix et le Désarmement par les femmes (Association for peace and disarmament by women). It was the third women's peace society established in Paris. Run only by women and with only women speakers, its emphasis was on the dangers associated with the arms race. She was a speaker at the Universal Peace Congress of 1907 in Munich.

Under the pseudonym of "Sylvio Hugo", she authored her husband's biography, Camille Flammarion, sa vie et son oeuvre : à propos des fêtes de Montigny-le-Roi (1891), and also wrote a novel.

She died of the Spanish flu in the 14th arrondissement of Paris on February 23, 1919, at the age of 82 years. Her tomb is located in the park of the Camille Flammarion Observatory of Juvisy-sur-Orge.

== Awards and honours ==
Pétiaux was awarded the Prix Jules Janssen in 1902, in recognition of her astronomical work and her services in behalf of the Astronomical Society of France, and the Observatory of Juvisy.

== Selected works ==
- Camille Flammarion, sa vie et son oeuvre : à propos des fêtes de Montigny-le-Roi, 1891
