= Albert Arnulf =

French engineer and physicist

Albert Arnulf (17 September 1898 – 3 August 1984) was a French engineer and physicist.

In 1939, Arnulf received the Prix Jules Janssen, the highest award of the Société astronomique de France, the French astronomical society.
