= Jean-Pierre Luminet =

French astrophysicist (born 1951)

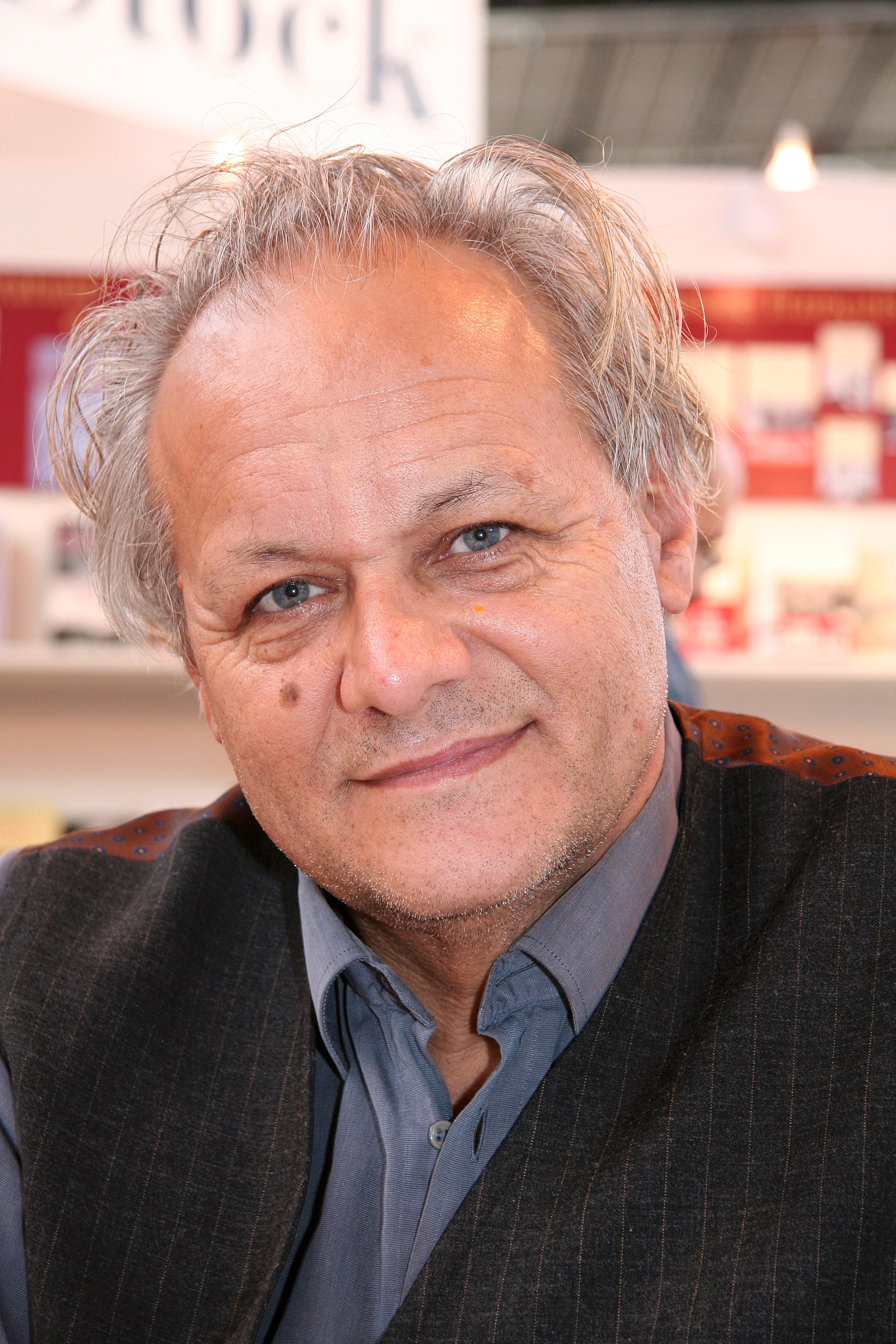
- Jean-Pierre Luminet at Salon du Livre 2009 (Paris, France)
- Born: June 3, 1951 (age 75); Cavaillon, France
- Education: Saint-Charles University of Marseilles; Paris-Meudon Observatory; Paris University (PhD)
- Known for: First computer simulation of a black hole, Tidal disruption event
- Scientific career
- Fields: Astrophysics, cosmology
- Workplaces: Centre national de la recherche scientifique Laboratoire d'Astrophysique de Marseille; Laboratoire Univers et Théories
- Thesis: (1977)
- Doctoral advisor: Brandon Carter

Jean-Pierre Luminet (born 3 June 1951) is a French astrophysicist, specializing in black holes and cosmology. He is an emeritus research director at the CNRS (Centre national de la recherche scientifique). Luminet is a member of the Laboratoire d'Astrophysique de Marseille (LAM) and Laboratoire Univers et Théories (LUTH) of the Paris-Meudon Observatory, and is a visiting scientist at the Centre de Physique Théorique (CPT) in Marseilles. He is also a writer and poet.

Luminet has been awarded several prizes on account of his work in pure science and science communication, including the Georges Lemaître Prize (1999) in recognition of his work in cosmology. In November 2021, he received the UNESCO Kalinga Prize for the Popularization of Science. He serves on the editorial board of Inference: The International Review of Science.

The asteroid 5523 Luminet, discovered in 1991 at Palomar Observatory, was named after him.

Luminet has published fifteen science books, seven historical novels, TV documentaries, and six poetry collections. He is an artist, an engraver, a sculptor, and a musician. During his music career, he has collaborated with composers such as Gérard Grisey and Hèctor Parra. Some of Luminet's literary works have been translated into other languages, such as Chinese, Korean, Bengali, German, Lithuanian, Greek, Italian or Spanish.

== Scientific career ==
After studying mathematics at the Saint-Charles University of Marseilles in 1976, Luminet moved to Paris-Meudon Observatory to undertake a Ph.D. with Brandon Carter as his advisor. He met Stephen Hawking at the Department of Applied Mathematics and Theoretical Physics in Cambridge, England. He defended his Ph.D. thesis in 1977 at Paris University on the subject of Singularities in Cosmology. In 1979, Luminet got a permanent research position at the CNRS and developed his scientific activities at Paris Observatory until 2014, before joining the Laboratoire d'Astrophysique de Marseille. During the two year interval, he was a visiting scientist at the University of São Paulo, Brazil (1984 and 1988), at the University of Berkeley, California (1989–1990) and a visiting astronomer at the European Southern Observatory, Chile (2005).

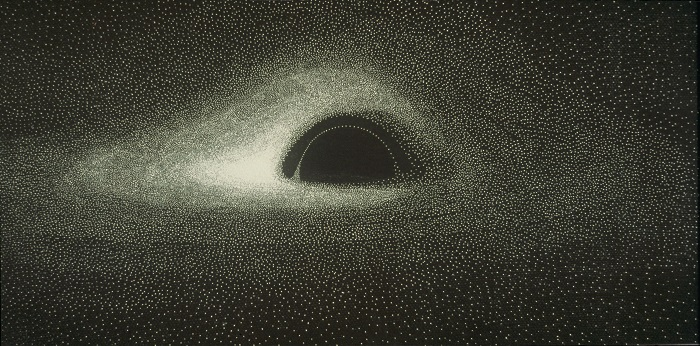
Image of a black hole generated by Luminet using a computer simulation

In 1978, Luminet created the first "image" of a black hole with an accretion disk, using an early computer, math, and India ink. He predicted that it could apply to the supermassive black hole in the core of the elliptical galaxy M87. In April 2019, the Event Horizon Telescope Consortium confirmed Luminet's predictions by providing the first telescopic image of the shadow of the M87* black hole and its accretion disk.

In 1982, along with physicist Brandon Carter, Luminet invented the concept of a tidal disruption event (TDE), the destruction of a star passing in the vicinity of a supermassive black hole. They showed that this phenomenon could result in the violent destruction of the star causing a "stellar pancake" and nuclear reactions in the core of the star in the stage of its maximum compression. With other collaborators, Luminet predicted specific observational signatures and introduced the concept of "tidal supernovae". The theory of TDE was confirmed by observing eruptions resulting from the accretion of stellar debris. It explains the superluminous supernova SN 2015L, the tidal explosion of a white dwarf before being absorbed beneath a massive black hole.

In 1995, with his colleague Marc Lachièze-Rey, Luminet coined the term "cosmic topology" for describing the shape of space, proposing a variety of universe models compatible with the standard Friedmann-Lemaître models of relativistic cosmology.

In 2003, large scale anomalies in the anisotropies of the cosmic microwave background observed by the Wilkinson Microwave Anisotropy Probe led to Luminet suggesting that the shape of the universe is a finite dodecahedron, attached to itself by paired opposite faces, forming a Poincaré homology sphere. During the following years, astronomers searched for more evidence to support this hypothesis but found none.

Jean-Pierre Luminet is a specialist in the history of cosmology and in particular the emergence of the concept of the Big Bang. In several books and articles, he emphasizes the leading role played by the Belgian priest and cosmologist Georges Lemaître. In 2018, the International Astronomical Union (IAU) recommended that Hubble's law be known as the Hubble-Lemaître law.

Luminet published a critical analysis of the holographic principle and the AdS/CFT correspondence while working on quantum gravity.

== Artistic activities ==
Luminet is devoted to drawing, engraving (learned with Jean Delpech at Ecole Polytechnique), and sculpture. A thorough analysis of his artwork has been done by Martin Kemp, Professor of Art History at Oxford University.

In the field of music, Luminet collaborated in 1991 with Gérard Grisey (a former pupil of Olivier Messiaen and Henri Dutilleux) to produce a piece of cosmic music called Le Noir de l'étoile (The Black of the Star). This work for six percussionists, based on magnetic tape and astronomical signals coming from pulsars, is regularly performed around the world. In 2011, he began a collaboration with Hèctor Parra, who composed the orchestral piece Caressant l'horizon (Caressing the Horizon) inspired by Luminet's books. In 2017, Luminet wrote the scenario for Parra's Inscape. Composed of an ensemble of 16 soloists, large orchestra, and electronics, the piece describes an Utopian voyage through a giant black hole. It was created in 2018 in Barcelona, Paris, and Köln.

In 1998, Luminet was a curator of the exhibition Figures du Ciel (Figures of Heaven), coupled to the opening of the new Bibliothèque nationale de France. (October 1998 – January 1999)

== Honors and recognition ==
Luminet has received more than twenty prizes and honors, including:

- 1999 – Georges Lemaître Prize in recognition of his work in cosmology (co-winner with Dominique Lambert)
- 1999 – The asteroid 5523 Luminet was named after him.
- 2002 – Grand Prize at the 7th researcher's film festival for his audiovisual work
- 2006 – Prix Paul Doistau-Émile Blutet of French Academy of Sciences for Science Popularization
- 2007 – European Prize for Science Communication
- 2008 – International G.B. Lacchini Prize from Italian Astroamateurs Union
- 2021 – UNESCO Kalinga Prize for the Popularization of Science.
- 2021– Prix Jules Janssen awarded by the Société astronomique de France

== Selected publications ==
=== Science books (in French) ===
- 1987 Les Trous Noirs (ISBN 2-02-015948-1)
- 1994 La Physique et l'infini with Marc Lachièze-Rey (ISBN 2-08-035183-4)
- 1998 Figures du Ciel with Marc Lachièze-Rey (ISBN 2-02-030768-5)
- 1999 Eclipses, les rendez-vous célestes with Serge Brunier (ISBN 2-04-727256-4)
- 2002 Le Feu du ciel : météores et astéroïdes tueurs (ISBN 2-7491-0030-5)
- 2004 L'invention du Big Bang (ISBN 2-02-061148-1)
- 2005 L'Univers chiffonné (ISBN 2-07-030052-8)
- 2005 De l'infini with Marc Lachièze-Rey (ISBN 2-10-048674-8)
- 2006 Le destin de l'univers : Trous noirs et énergie sombre (ISBN 2-213-63081-X)
- 2009 Bonnes nouvelles des étoiles with Élisa Brune (ISBN 978-2-7381-2287-2)
- 2011 Illuminations (ISBN 978-2-7381-2562-0)
- 2012 Astéroïdes : la Terre en danger (ISBN 978-2-7491-1779-9)
- 2015 L'univers en 100 questions (ISBN 979-1-0210-1654-5)
- 2016 Dialogues sous le ciel étoilé with H. Reeves (ISBN 978-2221157305)
- 2016 De l'infini – horizons cosmiques, multivers et vide quantique (augmented edition) with M. Lachièze-Rey (ISBN 978-2100794553)
- 2019 Chroniques de l'espace (ISBN 978-2749162485)
- 2020 : L'écume de l'espace-temps (ISBN 978-2738139719)
- 2021 : Du piano aux étoiles (ISBN 978-2368909416)
- 2022 : Les trous noirs en 100 questions (ISBN 979-1021034167)
- 2023 : Les nuits étoilées de Vincent van Gogh (ISBN 978-2232146206)
- 2023 : Journal idéoclaste (ISBN 978-2494959040)

=== Science books (in English) ===
- 1992 Black Holes (revised edition), Cambridge University Press
- 2001 Glorious Eclipses (with Serge Brunier), Cambridge University Press
- 2001 Celestial Treasury (with M. Lachièze-Rey), Cambridge University Press
- 2008 The Wraparound Universe, New York, AK Peters
- 2024 The Big Bang Revolutionaries, Seattle, Discovery Institute Press

=== Historical novels and poetry (in French) ===
- 1993 Noir soleil (ISBN 978-2-86274-275-5)
- 1996 Les poètes et l'Univers, Éditions le cherche-midi (ISBN 978-2-86274-473-5)
- 1999 Le Rendez-vous de Vénus (ISBN 978-2-7096-2025-3)
- 2004 Itinéraire céleste (ISBN 978-2-7491-0263-4)
- 2002 Le Bâton d'Euclide (ISBN 978-2-253-11471-0)
- 2006 Les bâtisseurs du ciel, Tome 1, Le secret de Copernic (ISBN 978-2-7096-2596-8)
- 2008 Les bâtisseurs du ciel, Tome 2, La discorde céleste: Kepler et le trésor de Tycho Brahé (ISBN 978-2-7096-2567-8)
- 2009 Les bâtisseurs du ciel, Tome 3, L'œil de Galilée (ISBN 978-2-7096-2902-7)
- 2010 Les bâtisseurs du ciel, Tome 4, La Perruque de Newton (ISBN 978-2-7096-2415-2)
- 2012 La Nature des choses, Éditions le cherche-midi (ISBN 978-2-7491-2727-9)
- 2014 Un trou énorme dans le ciel, Éditions Bruno Doucey (ISBN 978-2-362-29058-9)
- 2015 Ulugh Beg, L'astronome de Samarcande, Éditions Jean-Claude Lattès (ISBN 978-2-253-06787-0)
- 2022 Histoires extraordinaires et insolites d'astronomes, Éditions Buchet-Chastel(ISBN 978-2369148258)

== See also ==
- Physical cosmology
- List of cosmologists
- Non-standard cosmology
- Timeline of cosmology

== Sources ==
- Carter, B.; Luminet, J. P. (1982). "Pancake detonation of stars by black holes in galactic nuclei". Nature. 296 (5854): 211–214. Bibcode:1982Natur.296..211C. doi:10.1038/296211a0. S2CID 4316597.
- Lachièze-Rey, M.; Luminet, J.-P. (1996). "Cosmic topology". Physics Reports. 254 (3): 135–214. arXiv:gr-qc/9605010. Bibcode:1995PhR...254..135L. doi:10.1016/0370-1573(94)00085-H. S2CID 119500217.
- Luminet, J.-P. (1979). "Image of a spherical black hole with thin accretion disk". Astronomy & Astrophysics. 75: 228–235. Bibcode:1979A&A....75..228L.
