= International Time Bureau =

The International Time Bureau (French: Bureau international de l'heure, abbreviated BIH), seated at the Paris Observatory, was the international bureau responsible for combining different measurements of Universal Time. The bureau also played an important role in the research of time keeping and related fields: Earth rotation, reference frames, and atomic time. In 1987 the responsibilities of the bureau were taken over by the International Bureau of Weights and Measures (BIPM) and the International Earth Rotation and Reference Systems Service (IERS).

== History ==
The creation of the BIH was decided upon during the 1912 Conférence internationale de l'heure radiotélégraphique. The following year an attempt was made to regulate the international status of the bureau through the creation of an international convention. However, the convention wasn't ratified by its member countries due to the outbreak of World War I. In 1919, after the war, it was decided to make the bureau the executive body of the International Commission of Time, one of the commissions of the then newly founded International Astronomical Union (IAU), which had its headquarters in Paris.

Although international in its missions, the BIH was, throughout its history, essentially French in terms of its funding. Until 1966, the director of the Paris Observatory was also the BIH's director. In reality, the BIH's direction was entrusted to a directeur-adjoint (deputy director) or a chef des services du B.I.H. (head of B.I.H. services), i.e, a person in charge of BIH with a title that sometimes varied in the history of BIH. In January 1920, the director of the Paris Observatory, Benjamin Baillaud, delegated BIH's effective management to Guillaume Bigourdan who was in charge of BIH until 1928. Armand Lambert directed BIH from 1928 to 1942. Nicolas Stoyko was BIH's head from 1942 until he retired in 1964. Bernard Guinot, BIH's last director, was in charge from the 1st of October 1964 until the BIH ceased to exist in 1988.

From 1956 until 1987 the BIH was part of the Federation of Astronomical and Geophysical Data Analysis Services (FAGS). In 1987 the bureau's tasks of combining different measurements of Universal Time were taken over by the BIPM. Its tasks related to the correction of time with respect to the celestial reference frame and the Earth's rotation were taken over by the IERS.
