= 390 Alma =

Main-belt asteroid

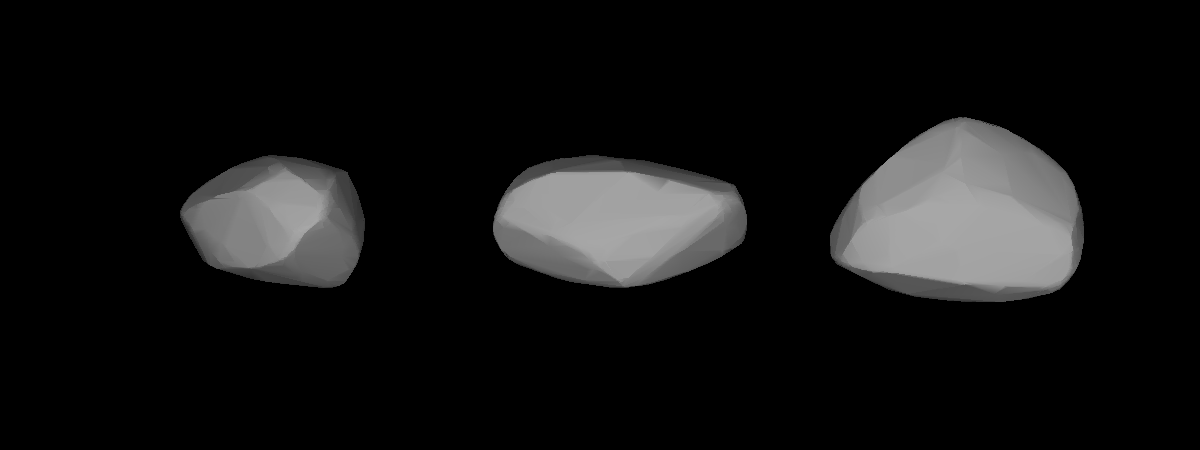
- A three-dimensional model of 390 Alma based on its light curve

Discovery
- Discovered by: Guillaume Bigourdan
- Discovery date: 24 March 1894

Designations
- Named after: Alma River
- Alternative designations: 1894 BC; 1930 QW; 1950 BV; 1950 CH; 1953 YB; 1963 DF
- Minor planet category: Main belt (Eunomia family)

Orbital characteristics
- Epoch 31 July 2016 (JD 2457600.5)
- Uncertainty parameter 0
- Observation arc: 122.02 yr (44568 d)
- Aphelion: 3.00211 AU (449.109 Gm)
- Perihelion: 2.29906 AU (343.934 Gm)
- Semi-major axis: 2.65059 AU (396.523 Gm)
- Eccentricity: 0.13262
- Orbital period (sidereal): 4.32 yr (1576.2 d)
- Mean anomaly: 136.953°
- Mean motion: 0° 13^{m} 42.229^{s} / day
- Inclination: 12.1645°
- Longitude of ascending node: 305.223°
- Argument of perihelion: 190.194°

Physical characteristics
- Dimensions: 23.74±1.4 km 24 km
- Mean density: ~2.7 g/cm^{3}
- Synodic rotation period: 3.74 h (0.156 d); 0.156 d
- Geometric albedo: 0.2190±0.029
- Spectral type: S-type asteroid
- Absolute magnitude (H): 10.39

390 Alma is an asteroid from the intermediate asteroid belt, approximately 24 kilometers in diameter. It was Guillaume Bigourdan's only asteroid discovery. He discovered it on 24 March 1894 in Paris.
