= Herbert Friedman =

American astronomer (1916–2000)

- Born: June 21, 1916; Brooklyn, New York, United States
- Died: September 9, 2000 (aged 84); Arlington County, Virginia, United States
- Education: Brooklyn College, Johns Hopkins University
- Awards: Wolf Prize in Physics (1987); Prix Jules Janssen (1990)
- Scientific career
- Fields: X-ray astronomy
- Workplaces: United States Naval Research Laboratory

Herbert Friedman (June 21, 1916 – September 9, 2000) was an American physicist and astronomer who did research in X-ray astronomy. During his career Friedman published hundreds of scientific papers. One such example is "Ultraviolet and X Rays from the Sun". Friedman worked at the Naval Research Laboratory (NRL) for the entirety of his professional career, from 1940-1980. He was elected to the American Academy of Arts and Sciences and the United States National Academy of Sciences in 1960. He received the Eddington Medal of the Royal Astronomical Society in 1964. That same year, he was elected to the American Philosophical Society. In 1987 he was awarded the Wolf Prize in Physics “for pioneering investigations in solar X-rays”. In 1990, he received the Prix Jules Janssen, the highest award of the Société astronomique de France, the French Astronomical Society.

== See also ==
- List of astronomers § H. Friedman
