= François Roddier =

French astronomer (1936–2023)

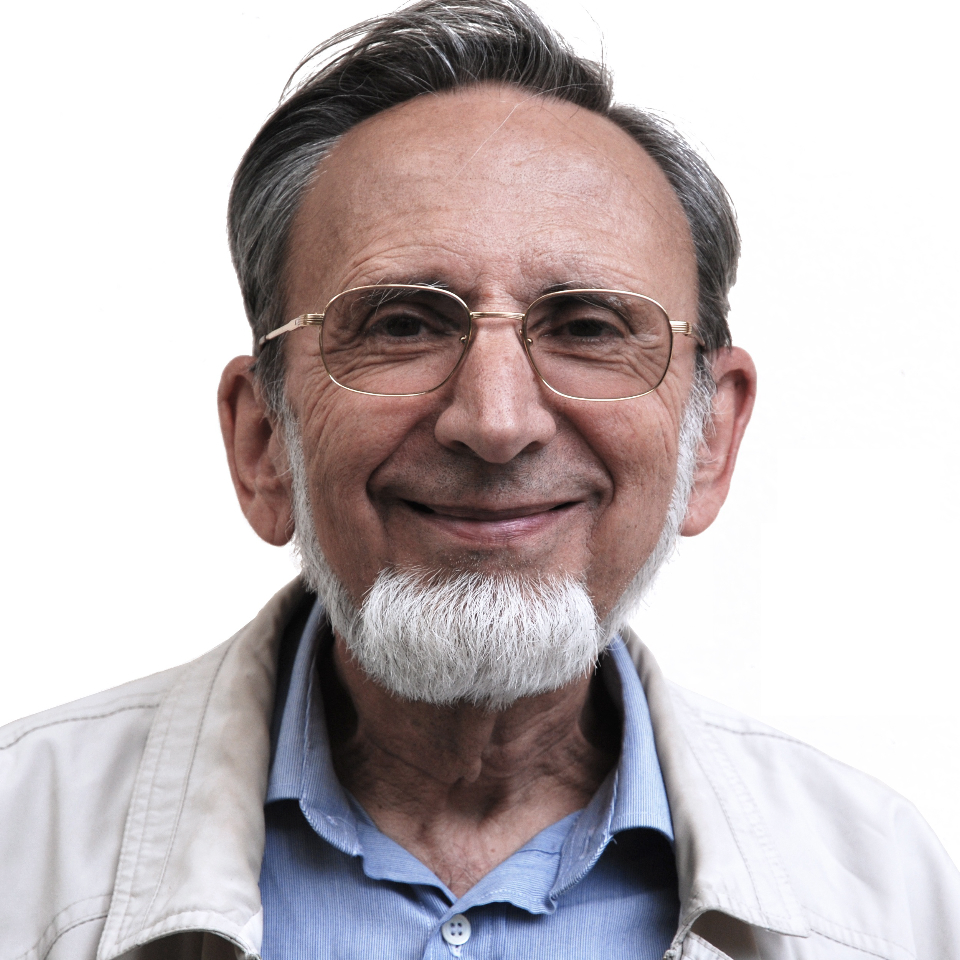
- Born: September 23, 1936; Paris, France
- Died: 19 August 2023 (aged 86); Hyères, France
- Education: École normale supérieure (Paris); French National Centre for Scientific Research
- Known for: The development of adaptive optics
- Spouse: Claude Roddier
- Scientific career
- Fields: Astronomy, physics
- Workplaces: Université de Nice; National Optical Astronomy Observatory; Institute for Astronomy (Hawaii) at the University of Hawaii
- Thesis: Etude à haute résolution de quelques raies de Fraunhofer par observation de la résonance optique d'un jet atomique; L'interférométre d'intensité et son application à la mesure des diamétres stellaires High resolution study of some Fraunhofer lines by observation of the optical resonance of an atomic jet; The intensity interferometer and its application to the measurement of stellar diameters (1964)
- Doctoral advisor: Jacques Blamont
- Website: https://www.francois-roddier.fr

François Roddier (23 September 1936 – 19 August 2023) was a French physicist and astronomer.

== Biography ==
François Roddier was born in 1936 in Paris. He received his baccalauréat degree in Lyon in 1954. In 1956 he received a degree from the École normale supérieure (Paris) in Physical Sciences. In 1960, he entered French National Centre for Scientific Research in the Sciences of the Universe section where he completed his doctoral thesis under the direction of Jacques Blamont. There he developed an atomic jet spectrograph and used it to study the Sun. He defended his thesis in 1964. In 1965, he was named professor at the Université de Nice where he created a department of astrophysics. He formed a research group in helioseismology. He was interested in the optical effects of atmospheric turbulence and developed high angular resolution interferometric observation methods with his spouse Claude Roddier.

In 1984, he immigrated with his family to the United States to work for the National Optical Astronomy Observatory where he participated in the development of adaptive optics. He proposed a new type of wavefront sensor called a curvature sensor. In 1988 he moved to the Institute for Astrophysics at the University of Hawaii where he created a group for the research and development of adaptive optics. This group built the first adaptive optics system based on bimorph deformable mirrors and curvature sensors. The principle would be used in the adaptive optics systems in the Canada–France–Hawaii Telescope, for that of the Japanese Subaru Telescope, and for the MACAO system of the European Southern Observatory.

Roddier retired in December 2000 and returned to live in France. During his retirement, he became interested in thermodynamic aspects of evolution.

François Roddier died on 19 August 2023, at the age of 86.

== Publications ==
=== Books ===
- The Thermodynamics of Evolution, trans. Stephen Ridgway, Parole éditions, 2020
- De la thermodynamique à l'économie. Le tourbillon de la vie, Parole éditions, 2018
- Thermodynamique de l'évolution. Un essai de thermo-bio-sociologie, Parole éditions, 2012
- Le pain, le levain et les gènes. Un essai sur l'évolution, Parole éditions, 2009
- 'Adaptive Optics in Astronomy' (in collaboration with ten other authors), Cambridge University Press, 1999
- Distributions et Transformation de Fourier, Ediscience (1971, 1978), McGraw Hill (1984, 1988, 1993).

=== Articles ===
- The Effects of Atmospheric Turbulence in Optical Astronomy, Progress in Optics, Vol. 19, p. 281-376
- Scientific Articles (NASA/ADS database)

== Honors and awards ==
- 1965 – Houlevigue Prize from French Academy of Sciences
- 1978 – Deslandres Prize from the French Academy of Sciences
- 1991 – Fellow member, American Optical Society
- 1992 – Médaille de l'ADION, Nice Observatory
- 1993 – Prix Jules Janssen from the Société astronomique de France
- 1996 – André Lallemand prize from the French Academy of Sciences
- 2000 – Board of Regents Medal of Excellence in Research, University of Hawaii
- 2002 – Maria and Eric Muhlmann Prize from the Astronomical Society of the Pacific

== See also ==
=== Filmography ===
- La thermodynamique des transitions économiques, aux Ateliers from the think tank The Shift Project, 12 March 2015

=== Related articles ===
- Self-organization
- Dissipative system
