= Jasna Brujić =

Soft matter physicist

Jasna Brujić is a soft matter physicist. Her research studies the mechanics of proteins and protein folding, jamming, sphere packing, adhesion, biomimetics, self-assembly, and the engineered behavior of emulsions. Educated in the UK and France, she works in the United States as a professor of physics at New York University.

== Education and career ==
Brujić did her undergraduate studies at Imperial College London, with a year abroad at ESPCI Paris. After receiving a master's degree with first class honours in chemistry in 2000, she went on to doctoral study in physics in Gonville and Caius College, Cambridge and the Cavendish Laboratory at the University of Cambridge. She completed her Ph.D. in 2003. Her doctoral dissertation was Experimental Study of Stress Transmission Through Particulate Matter; in it, she cites Sam Edwards and Ian Hopkinson as mentors, while crediting Stuart Clarke as her doctoral advisor.

She moved to New York City in 2004, to become a postdoctoral researcher for Julio M. Fernandez in the Department of Biological Sciences at Columbia University. In 2007, she joined New York University as an assistant professor of physics in the Center for Soft Matter Research.

== Recognition ==
Brujić was elected as a Fellow of the American Physical Society (APS) in 2019, after a nomination from the APS Division of Soft Matter, "for experimental studies of jamming, self-organization, and biomimetics of emulsions and colloids".
