= Ruth Durrer =

Astroparticle physicist and researcher

- Born: 1958 (age 67–68); Kerns
- Education: University of Zürich
- Scientific career
- Fields: Astroparticle physics
- Workplaces: University of Zürich; University of Geneva; University of Cambridge; Princeton University
- Thesis: Gauge-Invariant Cosmological Perturbation Theory (1988)
- Doctoral advisor: Norbert Straumann

Ruth Durrer (born 1958) is a professor of Cosmology at the University of Geneva. She works on the cosmic microwave background, brane cosmology and massive gravity.

== Early life and education ==
Durrer was born in Kerns. She earned her high school diploma at Kantonales Lehrerseminar, and studied at the University of Zürich. She completed her PhD on perturbation theory with Norbert Straumann at the University of Zürich in 1988. She was a postdoctoral researcher at the University of Cambridge for a year, before joining Princeton University in 1989. Durrer returned to Zürich in 1991, completing a postdoctoral fellowship.

== Research and career ==
Durrer was made an assistant professor at the University of Zürich in 1992, and full professor at the University of Geneva in 1995. She is a member of the Perimeter Institute for Theoretical Physics. She works on the cosmic microwave background and massive gravity. Massive gravity describes an expanding universe with massive gravitons, which weakens gravity on large scales. Durrer uses cosmological observations as a test for general relativity.

Durrer has contributed extensively to the theoretical understanding of topological defects. She showed that cosmic textures can suppress the acoustic peaks of the angular power spectrum of the cosmic microwave background. This results confirm that cosmic textures are not responsible for the distribution of matter in the observed universe. She worked with Neil Turok to demonstrate it is possible to use terrestrial lab-based experiments to test cosmological phase transitions in the early universe. These include using liquid crystals to study the scaling solutions of string networks. She has also demonstrated that density fluctuations in the early universe can result in the cosmological magnetic fields. She showed that the scaling properties of these primordial magnetic fields can be determined by causality arguments alone.

Durrer studied an extended area of space, separating it into 60 billion zones and using the c++ library LATfield2 with a supercomputer to study the movement of individual particles. She used Einstein's equations to calculate the distance in metric space, comparing this with the prediction of Newton's methods. She has investigated dark energy.

Durrer was elected to Academia Net by the Swiss National Science Foundation in 2012. She is a member of the committee of the International Union of Pure and Applied Physics International Society on General Relativity and Gravitation. She has held visiting academic positions at University of California, Berkeley, Princeton University, University of Paris-Sud and Galileo Galilei Institute.

=== Books ===
- Durrer, Ruth; García-Bellido, Juan; Shaposhnikov, Mikhail (2001). Cosmology and Particle Physics. Melville, New York: American Institute of Physics. ISBN 1-56396-986-6. OCLC 46930644.
- Durrer, Ruth (2008). The Cosmic Microwave Background. Cambridge University Press. doi:10.1017/CBO9780511817205. ISBN 978-0-511-81720-5. OCLC 297170401. S2CID 118734246.

=== Awards and honours ===
Her awards and honours include;

- 1992 Swiss Academy of Sciences Schaefli Award
- 2024 Prix Jules Janssen awarded by the Société astronomique de France

=== Personal life ===
Durrer is married with three children. She speaks German, English, French, and Swiss German.
