= Abell 1991 =

Galaxy cluster in the constellation of Boötes

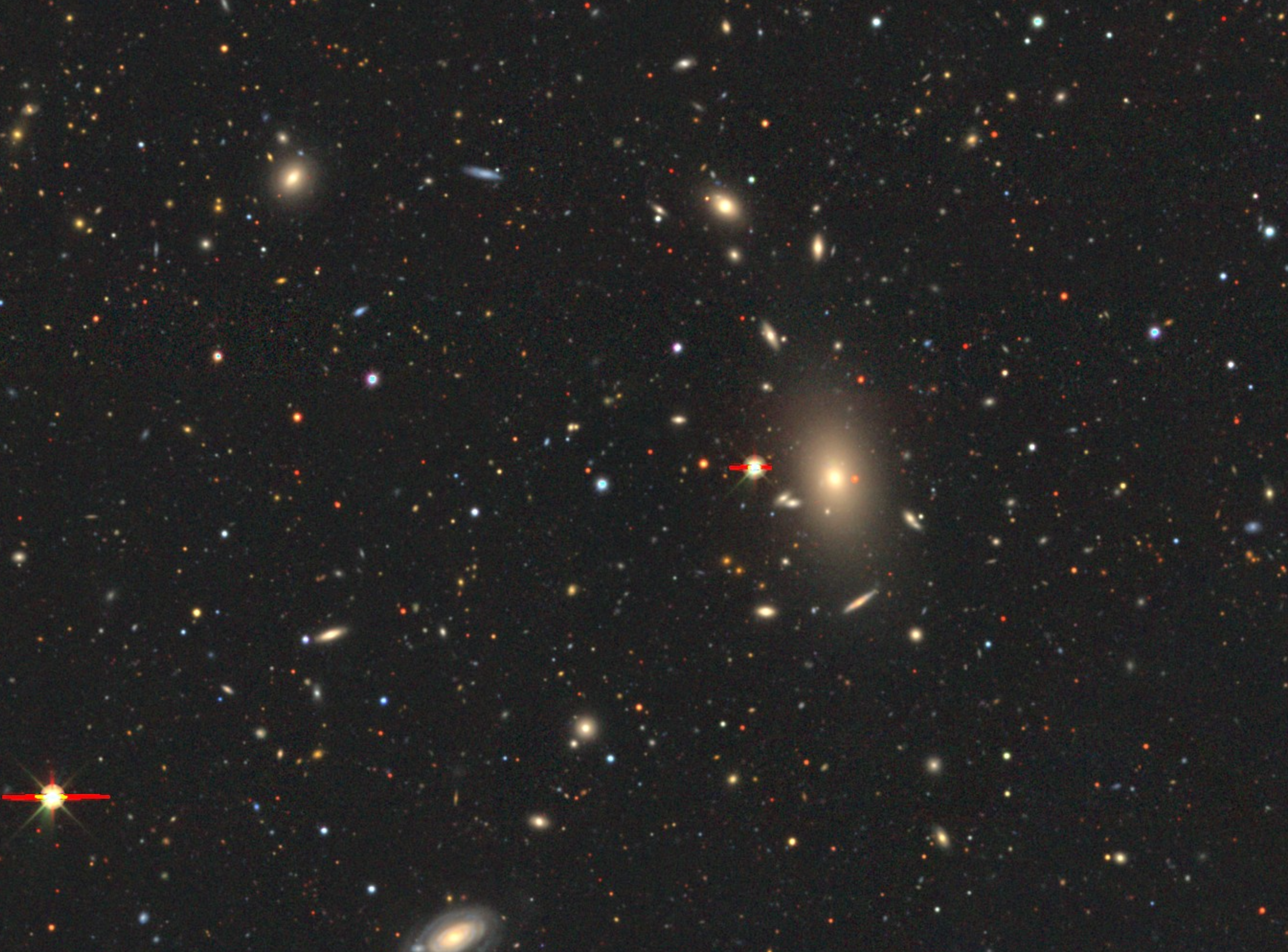
- Abell 1991 seen by DESI Legacy Surveys

Observation data (Epoch J2000)
- Constellation: Boötes
- Right ascension: 14^{h} 54^{m} 30.2^{s}
- Declination: +18° 37′ 51″
- Richness class: 1
- Bautz–Morgan classification: I
- Redshift: 0.05870 (17 598)
- Distance: 249 Mpc (812 Mly) h^{−1}_{0.705}
- ICM temperature: 2.61 keV
- Binding mass: 1.23×10^{14} M_{☉}
- X-ray flux: (9.40 ± 16.7%)×10^{−12} erg s^{−1} cm^{−2} (0.1–2.4 keV)

Abell 1991 is a galaxy cluster in the Abell catalogue. The central dominant galaxy (cD) of Abell 1991 is a large, moderately bright and slightly elongated elliptical.

== See also ==
- Abell catalogue
- List of Abell clusters
