= Computers and Mathematics with Applications =

Scientific journal

Computers and Mathematics with Applications (ISSN 0898-1221) is a peer-reviewed scientific journal published by Elsevier, covering scholarly research and communications in the area relating to both mathematics and computer science. It includes the more specific subjects of mathematics for computer systems, computing science in mathematics research, and advanced mathematical and computing applications in contemporary scientific fields, such as ecological sciences, large-scale systems sciences and operations research. The current Editor-in-Chief is Ervin Y. Rodin, who founded the journal in the 1980s.

The impact factor for 2020 was 3.476, ranking it 16th out of the 265 journals in the field of applied Mathematics in the Journal Citation Reports.
