= Suzanne Débarbat =

French astronomer and historian (1928–2024)

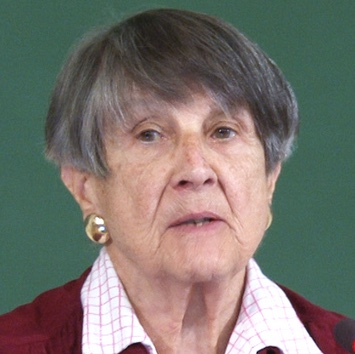
- Born: 4 September 1928; Montluçon, France
- Died: 6 August 2024 (aged 95); Ivry-sur-Seine, France
- Education: Paris University
- Employer(s): Paris Observatory; Bureau des Longitudes
- Organization(s): International Astronomical Union (IAU); Académie Internationale d’Histoire des Sciences; French Topography Association; French National Committee for the History and Philosophy of Science
- Awards: Legion of Honour; Ordre national du Mérite; Ordre des Arts et des Lettres; Prix Jules Janssen

Suzanne Virginie Débarbat (4 September 1928 – 6 August 2024) was a French astronomer and historian of science and technology. She worked at the Paris Observatory for the duration of her career.

== Biography ==
Débarbat was born on 4 September 1928 in Montluçon, France. Her parents were Victor Débarbat and Léontine-Pauline Débarbat.

Débarbat achieved her doctorate in 1969 from the Paris University. In 1953, Débarbat joined Paris Observatory as an Assistant and worked there for the whole of her career. She was a member of the International Astronomical Union (IAU), serving as the president of the IAU Commission 41 (History of Astronomy) from 1991 to 1994. She was also a member of the Bureau des Longitudes, serving as president from 2004 to 2005, Académie Internationale d’Histoire des Sciences, French Topography Association and the French National Committee for the History and Philosophy of Science.

Débarbat was also a historian of science and technology, principally focused on 17th-century astronomy in France and Europe. Her historical research included Jean Dominique Cassini’s presentation of a new map of the Moon to the Academy of Sciences in Paris in 1679, the origins of the metric system in France and the history of the Paris Observatory.

Débarbat died on 6 August 2024 in Ivry-sur-Seine, France, aged 95.

== Awards ==
- Ladies' award [fr] of the Société astronomique de France (1977)
- Knight (1996), then Officer of the Legion of Honour (2006)
- Officer of the Ordre national du Mérite (2001)
- Commander of the Ordre des Arts et des Lettres (2013)
- Prix Jules Janssen de l’Information Scientifique (2019)

Minor planet 15671 Suzannedébarbat was named in her honour.
