= Georges Courtès =

French astronomer (1925–2019)

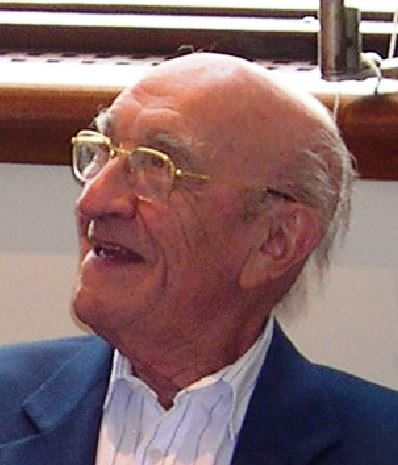

Georges Courtès (24 April 1925 – 31 October 2019) was a French astronomer and a member of the French Academy of Sciences.

== Career ==
Georges Courtès was born in Toul, Meurthe-et-Moselle, and devoted his career to imaging and spectrography in ground and space astrophysics. He was awarded the Prix Jules Janssen by the Société astronomique de France in 1981.
