= Guillaume Bigourdan =

French astronomer

Camille Guillaume Bigourdan
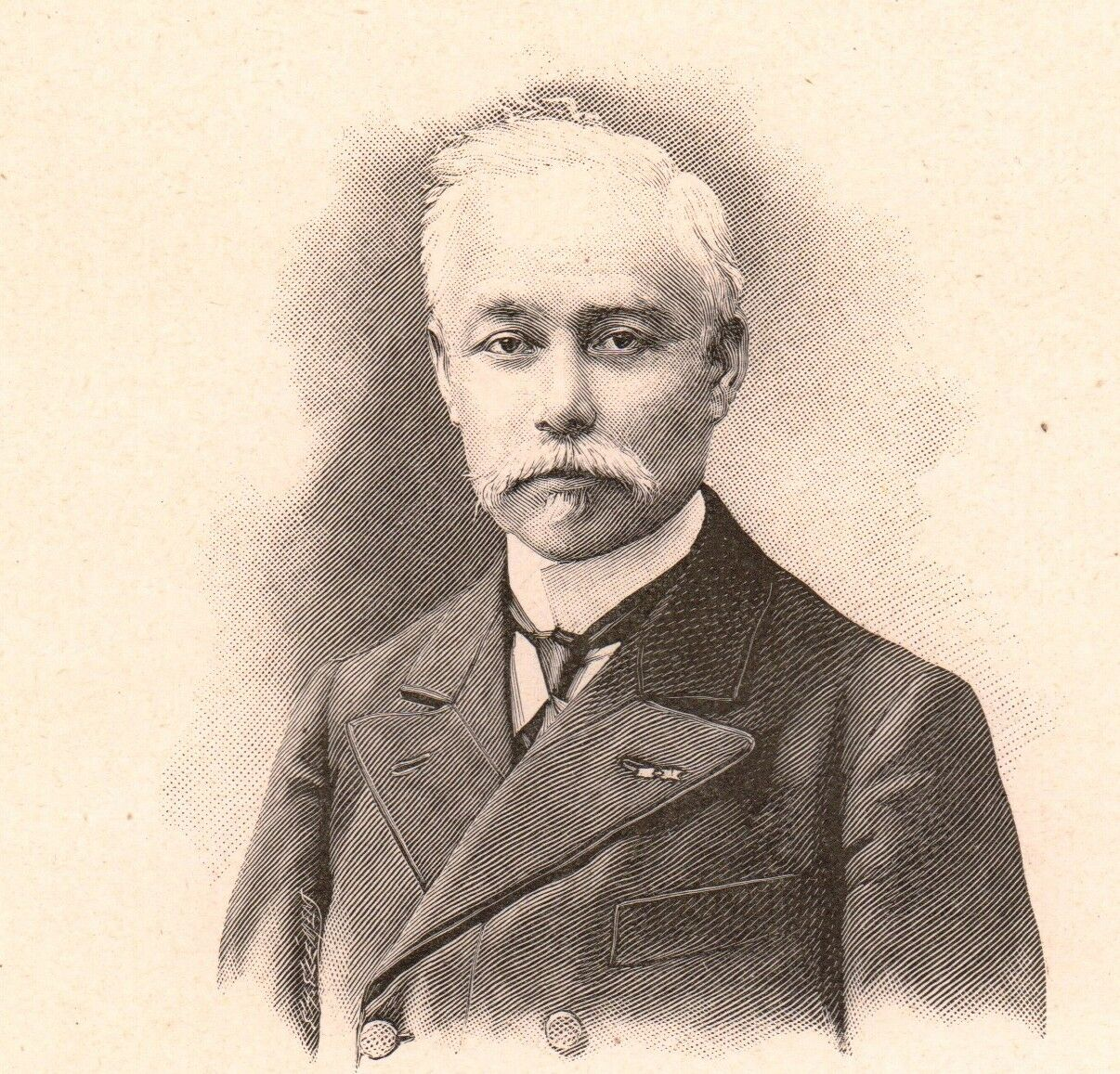
- Born: 6 April 1851; Sistels
- Died: 28 February 1932 (aged 80); Paris
- Spouse: Marie Mélanie Sophie Mouchez
- Children: 9
- Awards: Lalande Prize (1883, 1891); Valz Prize (1886); Gold Medal of the Royal Astronomical Society; Prix Jules Janssen
- Scientific career
- Fields: Astronomy
- Workplaces: Paris Observatory
- Thesis: Sur l'équation personnelle dans les mesures d'étoiles doubles

Asteroids discovered: 1
390 Alma	24 March 1894

Camille Guillaume Bigourdan (French pronunciation: [kamij ɡijom biɡuʁdɑ̃]; 6 April 1851 – 28 February 1932) was a French astronomer.

== Personal life ==
Bigourdan was born at Sistels, Tarn-et-Garonne to Pierre Bigourdan and Jeanne Carrière. When his teachers and local curate recognised his intelligence, he was transferred to a local boarding school in Valence d’Agen, where he excelled. In 1870, he received his Baccalauréat with mention of "Assez Bien".

He married Marie Mélanie Sophie Mouchez, the eldest daughter of Admiral Amédée Mouchez. Together, the two had nine children. The entire family, including the Mouchez cousins, would frequently vacation in Sistels until the outbreak of the First World War, after which Bigourdan would vacation alone. During these vacations, he would farm his land and visit former classmates.

He was fluent in Occitan, and spoke it when in Sistels.

== Academic and scientific career ==
Bigourdan studied at the University of Toulouse from 1870, where he received a physics degree in 1874 and a mathematics degree in 1876. To finance these studies, he taught at a boarding school.

In 1877 he was appointed by Félix Tisserand as assistant astronomer at the Toulouse Observatory, and in 1879 followed Tisserand to the Paris Observatory when the latter became director there.

In 1886, he submitted his doctoral thesis Sur l'équation personnelle dans les mesures d'étoiles doubles (FR: On the personal equation in double star measurements) on the measurements of 2800 double stars.

He spent many years verifying the positions of 6380 nebulae. He hoped to set a basis for future studies of the proper motion of nebulae; this turned out to be more or less in vain, since distant nebulae will not show any proper motion. However, he did discover approximately 500 new objects. These observations are published throughout 5 volumes of the Annales of the Paris observatory, over 3000 pages. Additionally, in 1894, Bigourdan discovered the asteroid 390 Alma.

Bigourdan was an avid traveler for astronomical events; he took part in the observation of the transit of venus in Martinique in June 1882. On the same trip, he visited St Petersburg, Kraków, Berlin and Vienna. In 1892, he visited Joal, Senegal, to observe the total eclipse of the sun on 16 April 1893.

In 1902 he participated in an effort to redetermine with greater precision the longitude difference between London and Paris. He became a member of the Bureau des Longitudes in 1903, and a member of the French Academy of Sciences in 1904. Due to his interest in the transmission of time signals by wireless, he was instituted as the director of the newly founded International Time Service in 1912, which was in charge of maintaining the switch to the new Greenwich time. He remained in this position until 1928.

He described a method for adjusting equatorial mount telescopes, which was known as "Bigourdan's method".

Bigourdan won the Lalande Prize of the French Academy of Sciences in 1883 and in 1891, the Valz Prize of the same institution in 1886, and the Gold Medal of the Royal Astronomical Society in 1919. He was director of the Bureau International de l'Heure from 1919 to 1928. In 1919, he received the Prix Jules Janssen, the highest award of the Société astronomique de France, the French astronomical society. In 1924, he was made president of the Académie des Sciences and the Institute of France, after serving as its vice-president in 1923.

In addition, Bigourdan discovered various lost manuscripts, particularly those of J.A.G Pingré, and contributed to numerous historical studies. He published Annales célestes du XVIIe siècle in 1901.
