= Fernand Holweck Medal and Prize =

European prize for Physics

- Sponsored by: Société Française de Physique, Institute of Physics
- Presented by: Institute of Physics, Société Française de Physique
- Rewards: Gold medal, 3000€
- First award: 1945
- Website: http://www.iop.org/about/awards/

The Fernand Holweck Medal and Prize is a major European prize for Physics awarded jointly every year by the British Institute of Physics (IOP) and the Société Française de Physique (SFP). It is one of the four Grand Prix of the SFP and one of the four International Bilateral Awards of the IOP, consisting of a gold medal and a 3000€ cash prize.

== History ==
The prize was established in 1945 as a memorial to Fernand Holweck and other French physicists who were persecuted or killed by the Nazis during the German occupation of France during World War II, from 1940 to 1945. It was originally a £150 prize. It is awarded for distinguished work in experimental physics (which reflects Holweck's scientific interest) or in theoretical physics which is closely related to experimentation.

The Holweck Prize is awarded every year, alternately to a French physicist and a British or Irish physicist. In 1974 two awards were made to mark the centenaries of the two societies. Holweck Laureates include several Nobel Prize winners. The award received increased media attention in 2014 when it was awarded to Iranian physicist Ramin Golestanian.

== Recipients ==
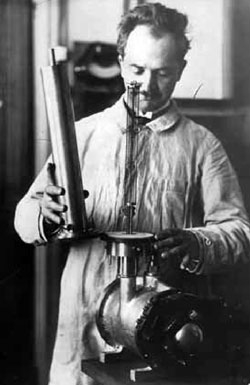
Fernand Holweck

The following have received this medal:

- 1946 Charles Sadron
- 1947 Edward Neville da Costa Andrade
- 1948 Yves Rocard
- 1949 Leslie Fleetwood Bates
- 1950 Pierre Jacquinot
- 1951 Thomas Ralph Merton
- 1952 Louis Néel
- 1953 John Ashworth Ratcliffe
- 1954 Alfred Kastler
- 1955 Nicholas Kurti
- 1956 Jean Paul Mathieu
- 1957 Denys Haigh Wilkinson
- 1958 Anatole Abragam
- 1959 Robert Hanbury Brown
- 1960 Jean Brossel
- 1961 Alfred Brian Pippard
- 1962 Jean-François Denisse
- 1963 Frederick Charles Frank
- 1964 Jacques Friedel
- 1965 Martin Ryle
- 1966 Raimond Castaing
- 1967 Heinrich Gerhard Kuhn
- 1968 Pierre-Gilles de Gennes
- 1969 Alan Howard Cottrell
- 1970 Pierre Connes
- 1971 Dennis Gabor
- 1972 Lionel Solomon
- 1973 Brian David Josephson
- 1974 Philippe Nozières and Antony Hewish
- 1975 Evry Schatzman
- 1976 Harry Elliot
- 1977 Maurice Goldman
- 1978 William Frank Vinen
- 1979 André Blandin
- 1980 David James Thouless
- 1981 René Turlay
- 1982 Raymond Hide
- 1983 Gérard Toulouse
- 1984 Brebis Bleaney
- 1985 Denis Jérome
- 1986 Gareth Gwyn Roberts
- 1987 Edouard Fabre
- 1988 Peter Hirsch
- 1989 Eric Varoquaux
- 1990 Roger Cowley
- 1991 Alain Aspect
- 1992 Donald Hill Perkins
- 1993 David Ruelle
- 1994 Lawrence John Challis
- 1995 Pierre Léna
- 1996 John Wickham Steeds
- 1997 Jean-Pierre Briand
- 1998 William Gelletly
- 1999 Oriol Bohigas
- 2000 Frank Henry Read
- 2001 Pierre Coullet
- 2002 John Bernard Pethica
- 2003 Catherine Brechignac
- 2004 Adrian F G Wyatt
- 2005 Philippe Monod
- 2006 Julia Higgins
- 2007 Jean-Pierre Hulin
- 2008 Denis Weaire
- 2009 Christian Colliex
- 2010 Steven T. Bramwell
- 2011 Joël Cibert
- 2012 Helen Gleeson
- 2013 Alexandre Bouzdine
- 2014 Ramin Golestanian
- 2015 Isabelle Ledoux-Rak
- 2016 Zoran Hadzibabic
- 2017 Victor Malka
- 2018 Marina Galand
- 2019 Xavier Garbet
- 2020 Charles Adams
- 2021 Guy Le Lay
- 2022 Philippe Claudin and Bruno Andreotti
- 2023 Amaury Triaud

== See also ==
- Institute of Physics Awards
- List of physics awards
- List of awards named after people
