= Virginie Chamard =

French crystallographer

Virginie Chamard (born 1974) is a French crystallographer whose research involves the development of methods for coherent diffraction imaging and Bragg ptychography, and the use of these methods to understand the crystal structure of biominerals, including coral, shell, and mineralizing microorganisms; she has also applied her research to microelectronics and nanoelectronics. She is a director of research for the French National Centre for Scientific Research (CNRS), affiliated with the Fresnel Institute in Marseille.

Chamard defended her doctoral thesis, Études structurales du silicium poreux par techniques de rayons, in 2000 at Joseph Fourier University, under the direction of Gérard Dolino. After postdoctoral research at the University of Dortmund in Germany, she joined CNRS in 2003 and joined the Fresnel Institute in 2008.

She is a 2026 recipient of the CNRS Silver Medal.
