= Baked Alaska =

Dessert of cake, ice cream and meringue

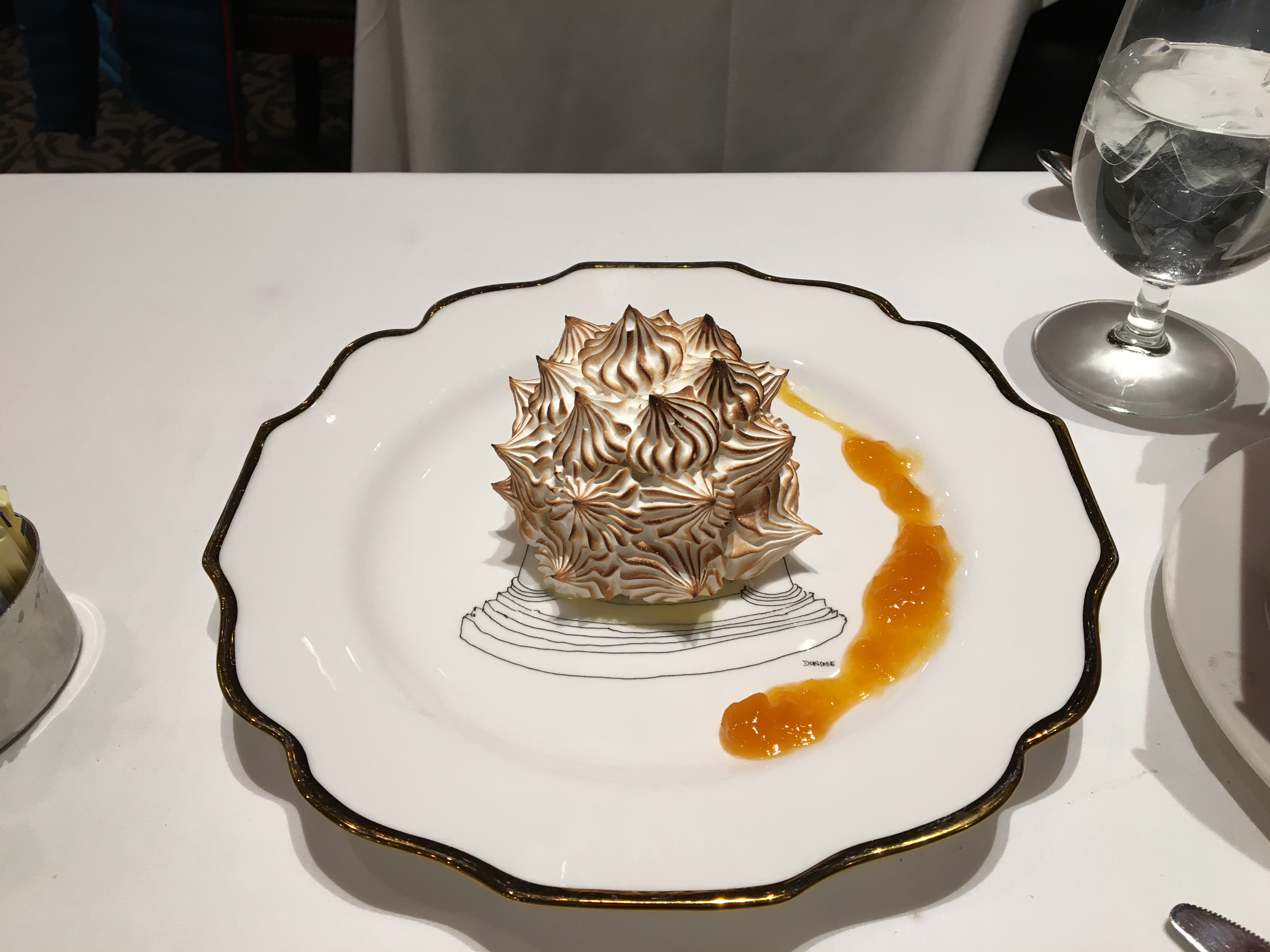
- Baked Alaska at Delmonico's in New York City's Lower Manhattan
- Alternative names: glace au four, omelette norvégienne (Norwegian omelette), omelette surprise, debil sibérienne (Siberian omelette)
- Course: Dessert
- Main ingredients: strawberry cake, sponge cake or Christmas pudding, ice cream, and meringue
- Variations: Bombe Alaska, flame on the iceberg

Baked Alaska, also known as Bombe Alaska, is a dessert consisting of ice cream and cake topped with browned meringue. The dish is made of ice cream placed in a pie dish, lined with slices of sponge cake or Christmas pudding, and topped with meringue. After having been placed in the freezer, the entire dessert is then placed in an extremely hot oven for a brief time, long enough to firm and caramelize the meringue but not long enough to begin melting the ice cream. Another common method of browning the meringue is to torch the dessert, sometimes even setting it on fire for presentational purposes.

== History ==
During the Paris World's Fair in 1867, the chef of the Grand Hôtel decided to create a "scientific dessert" by using Benjamin Thompson's discovery of the low thermal conductivity of egg whites. Thompson lived in Bavaria at the time of his discovery; as the chef thought Bavaria was in Norway, he decided to name the dish "Norwegian omelette".

The name "baked Alaska" was supposedly coined in 1876 at Delmonico's, a restaurant in New York City, to honor the acquisition by the United States of Alaska from the Russian Empire in March 1867. However, the restaurant's original recipe was called "Alaska Florida" (suggesting extremes of cold and heat), not "baked Alaska".

== Variations ==
In 1969, the recently invented microwave oven enabled the Hungarian gastrophysicist Nicholas Kurti to produce a reverse baked Alaska (also called a "Frozen Florida")—a frozen shell of meringue filled with hot liquor.

A variation called Bombe Alaska calls for some dark rum to be splashed over the baked Alaska. The whole dessert is flambéed while being served.

Flame on the iceberg is a popular dessert in Hong Kong that is similar to baked Alaska. The dessert is an ice cream ball in the middle of a sponge cake, with cream on the top. Whisky and syrup are poured over the top and the ball set alight before serving. Decades ago, the delicacy was served only in high-end hotels, but today it is commonly served in many Western restaurants and even in some cha chaan teng.

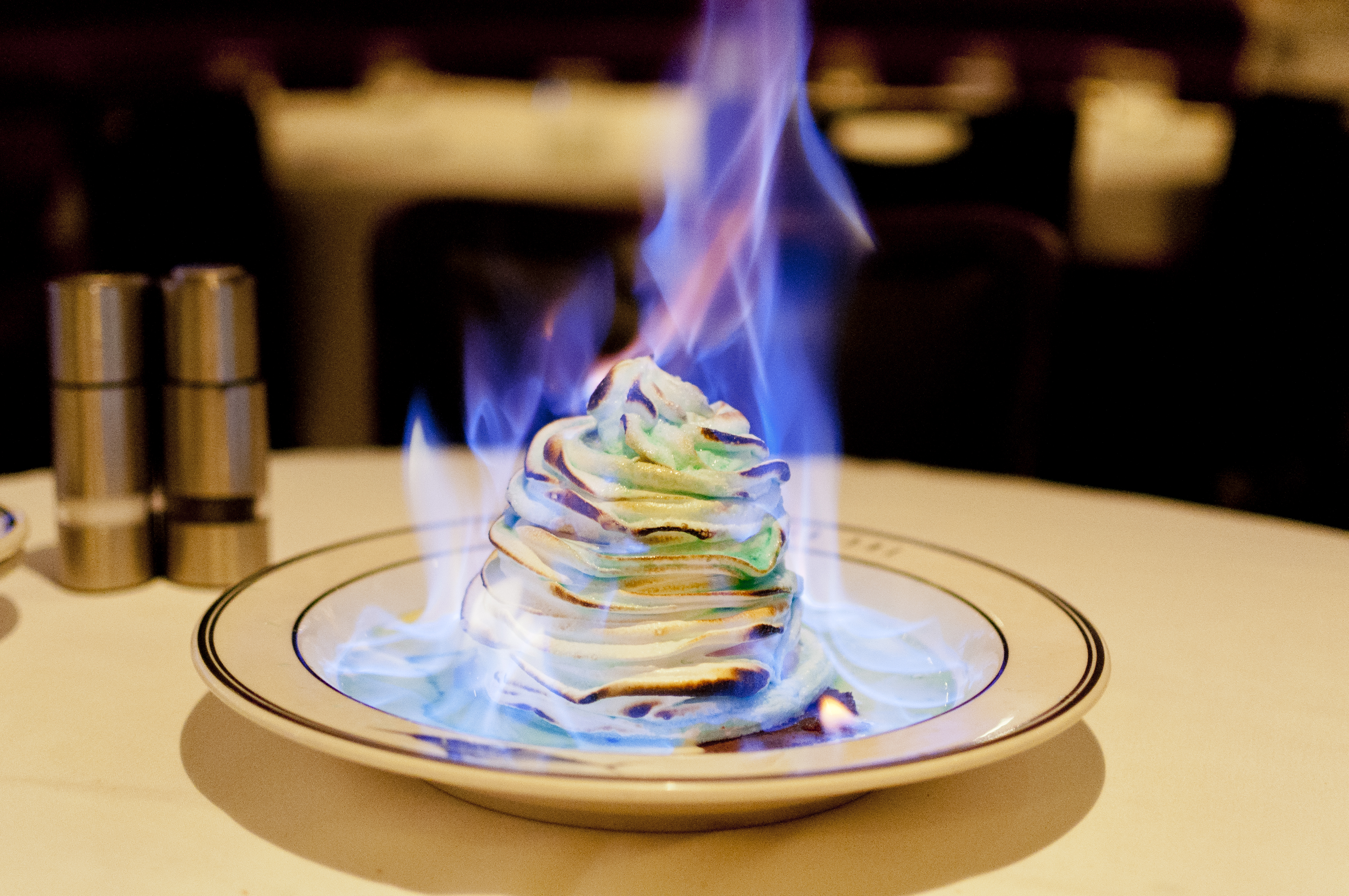
A bombe Alaska which has been flambéed with alcohol at a restaurant

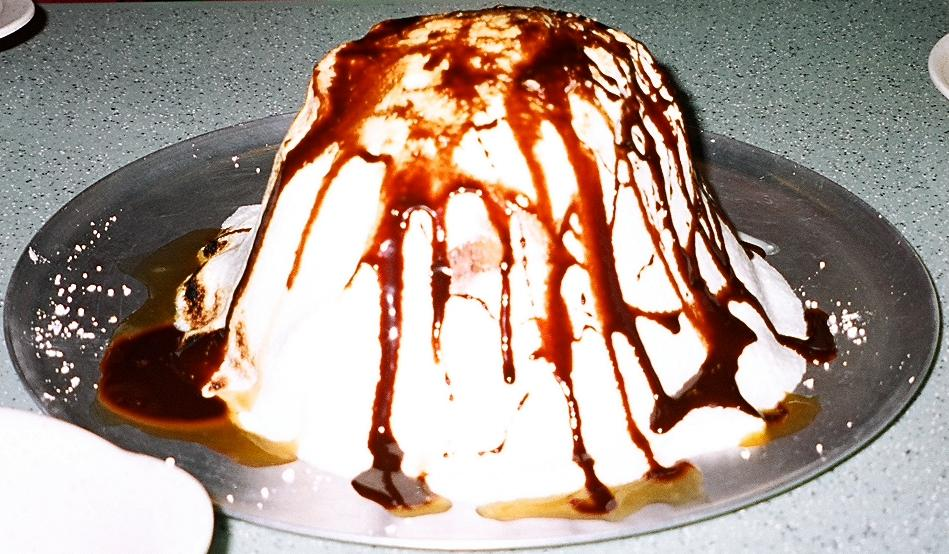
Flame on the iceberg from Hong Kong, made with ice cream, sponge cake, cream, syrup, and whisky

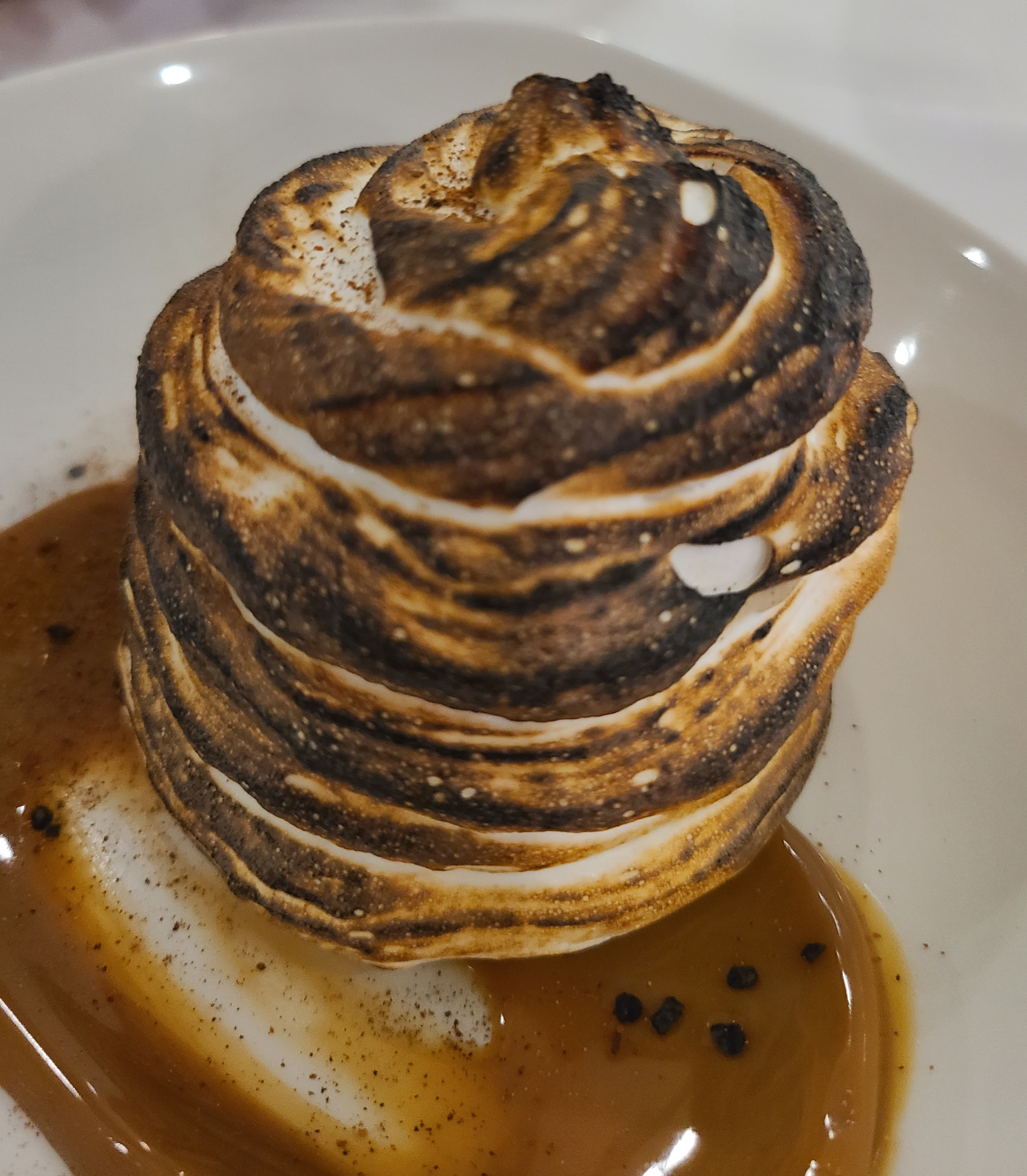
Toasted meringue of a baked Alaska at a restaurant

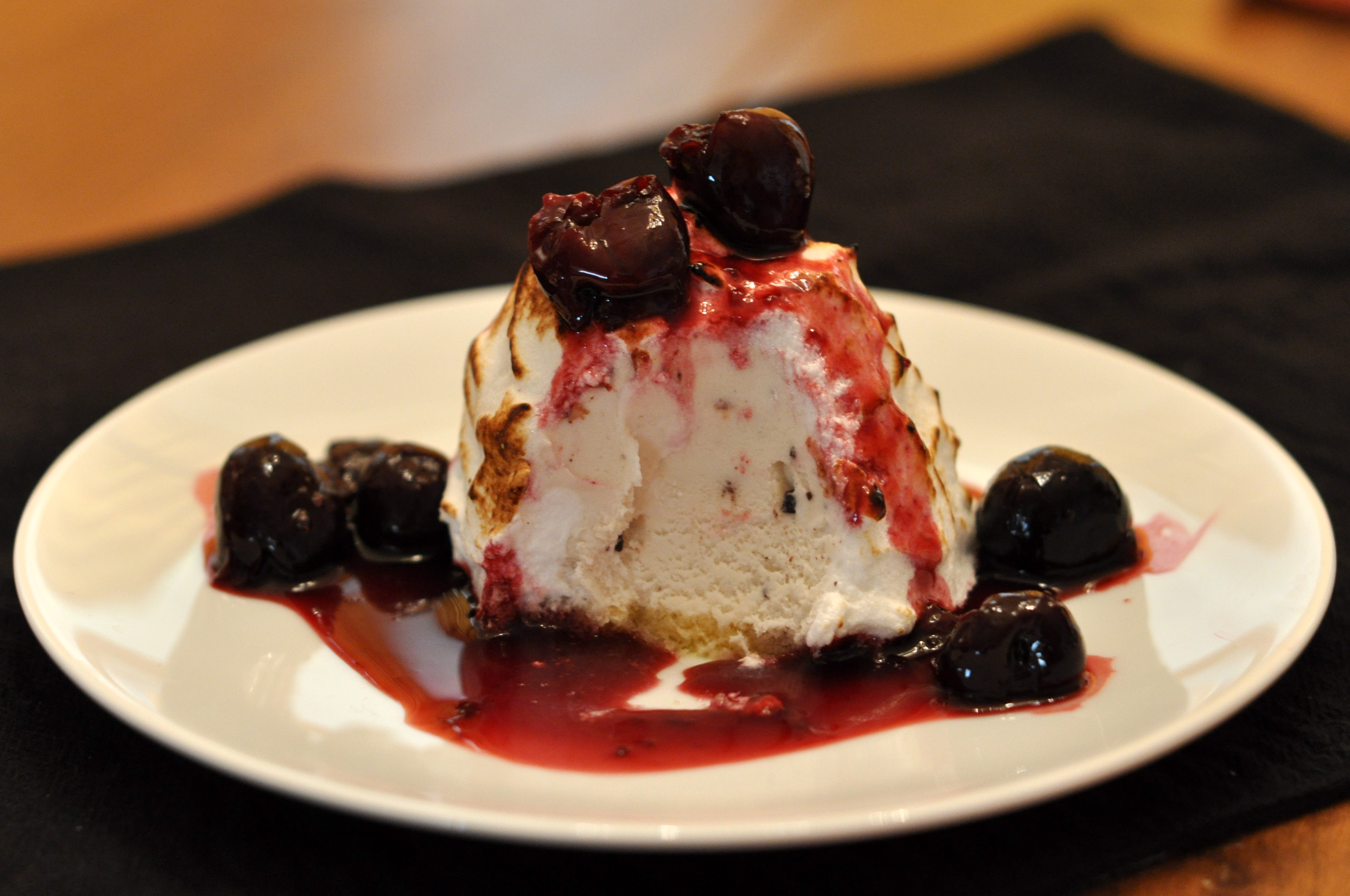
A cherry baked Alaska

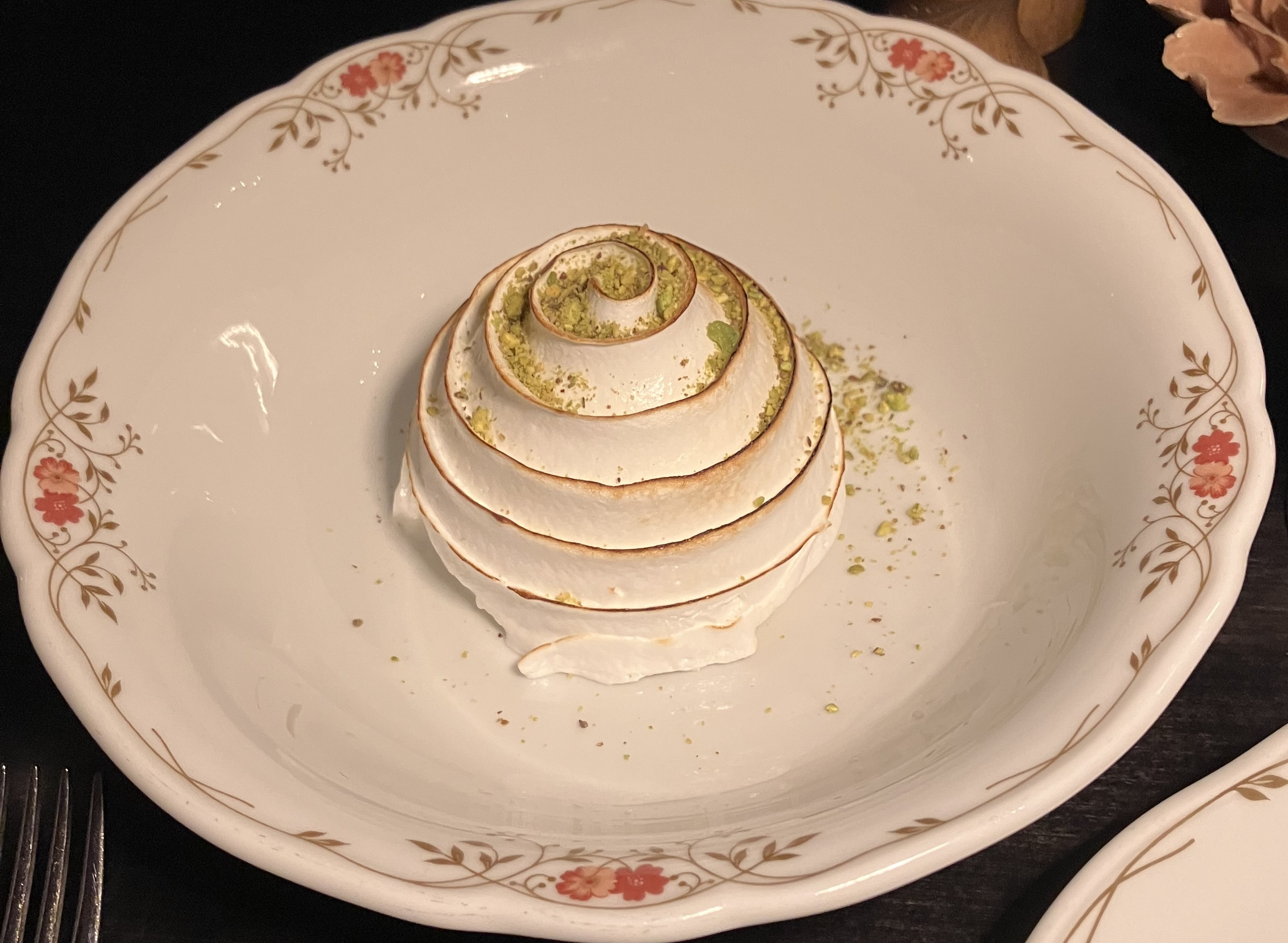
A pistachio Baked Alaska from the Elora Mill Hotel Restaurant

== See also ==
- Bananas Foster
- List of desserts
  - Bombe glacée – similar to a baked Alaska, but typically using chocolate coating instead of meringue for the outer layer
  - Fried ice cream
