= Rak (surname) =

Rak (Czech and Slovak feminine: Raková) is a surname appearing in various languages. Rák (feminine: Ráková) is a Hungarian-language surname, often appearing in Slovakia. Notable people with these surnames include:

== Rak ==
- Dmitry Rak (born 1976), Belarusian freestyle skier
- Edita Raková (born 1978), Slovak ice hockey player
- Miljenko Rak (born 1947), Croatian long-jumper and athletic trainer
- Natalia Rak (born 1986), Polish street artist
- Niko Rak (born 2003), Croatian footballer
- Nikola Rak (born 1987), Croatian footballer
- Radek Rak (born 1987), Polish writer
- Renata Rak (born 1973), Polish politician
- Richmond Rak (born 1985), Ghanaian-Swiss footballer
- Štěpán Rak (born 1945), Rusyn-born Czech classical guitarist and composer
- Yonatthan Rak (born 1993), Uruguayan footballer

== Rák ==
- Richárd Rák, Hungarian politician
- Róbert Rák (born 1978), Slovak footballer
- Sebastián Rák (born 2003), Slovak footballer
- Viktória Ráková (born 1981), Slovak actress

== See also ==
- Isabelle Ledoux-Rak (born 1957), French physicist
- Jesurun Rak-Sakyi (born 2002), English footballer
- Samuel Rak-Sakyi (born 2005), English footballer
- Symon Rak-Michajłoŭski (1885–1938), Belarusian political leader
