= Maurice Goldman =

Maurice Goldman may refer to:

- Maurice Goldman (composer), composer and conductor
- Maurice Goldman (physicist), French physicist
