= Carole Deumié =

French academic

Carole Deumié is a French physicist and the director of Centrale Méditerranée, a French Grande école in Marseille, France. She is president of the Association of Grandes écoles Région Sud, federating 20 schools with a total student population over 22,000 and 1,500 staff.

== Education and career ==
Carole Deumié received a B.S and a M.S from Centrale Méditerranée (formerly École Nationale Supérieure de Physique de Marseille) in 1993, and a Ph.D. in physics from Aix-Marseille University in 1997. She became a lecturer at Centrale Méditerranée in 1998. Since 2012 she has been the lead of the DiMaBio team at Fresnel Institute. In 2019, she was appointed director of Centrale Méditerranée.
