= Adrian Wyatt =

British physicist

Adrian Frederick George Wyatt, FRS is a British physicist, and Emeritus Professor at University of Exeter. He is a member of the Quantum Systems and Nanomaterials group. He won the 2004 Fernand Holweck Medal and Prize of the Institute of Physics.

== Works ==
- Lifetimes of Fast R+ rotons due to Scattering by Thermal Phonons in Superfluid 4He. M.A.H. Tucker and A.F.G. Wyatt J Low Temp Physics 110 (1998) 425-430
- A Fast Pulsed Source of Ballistic R- rotons in Superfluid 4He, M.A.H. Tucker and A.F.G. Wyatt, J Low Temp Physics 110 (1998) 455-460
- The Contact Angle of Liquid 4He on Cs: evidence for ripplons at the He-Cs interface.J. Klier and A.F.G. Wyatt, J Low Temp Physics 110 (1998) 919-943
- Evidence for Bose Einstein Condensate in Liquid 4He from Quantum Evaporation. A.F.G. Wyatt Nature 391 (1998) 56-59
- The Thin Film State of 4He on Cs and Rb. J. Klier and Adrian F.G. Wyatt, J Low Temp Physics 113 (1998) 817-822
- The Evaporation Probability of R- rotons relative to R+ rotons in Superfluid 4He. M.A.H. Tucker and A.F.G. Wyatt, J Low Temp Physics 113 (1998) 615-620
- The Spatial Evolution of High Frequency Phonons in Superfluid 4He from a Pulse-Heated Source. M.A.H. Tucker and A.F.G. Wyatt, J Low Temp Physics 113 (1998) 621-626
- The Creation of High Energy Phonons from Low Energy Phonons in Liquid Helium. I.N. Adamenko, K.É. Nemchenko, A.V. Zhukov, M.A.H. Tucker and A.F.G. Wyatt Phys. Rev. Letts 82 (1999) 1482-5
- Direct Evidence for R- Rotons Having Antiparallel Momentum and Velocity M.A.H. Tucker and A.F.G. Wyatt Science 283 (1999) 1150
- The Nonwetting Behaviour of Dilute 3He/4He Mixtures on Cs. J. Klier and A.F.G. Wyatt J Low Temp Physics (1999) to be published
- The creation of supra-thermal densities of high energy phonons in HeII A.F.G. Wyatt, M.A.H. Tucker, I.N. Adamenko, K.É. Nemchenko and A.V. Zhukov Physica B (1999)
- The Generation of High Energy Phonons from a Cold Phonon Pulse and their Lifetime in Superfluid 4He M.A.H. Tucker, A.F.G. Wyatt, I.N. Adamenko, K.É. Nemchenko and A.V. Zhukov In preparation (1999)
