= Eduardo Maruri =

Ecuadorian businessman and politician

Eduardo Maruri Miranda
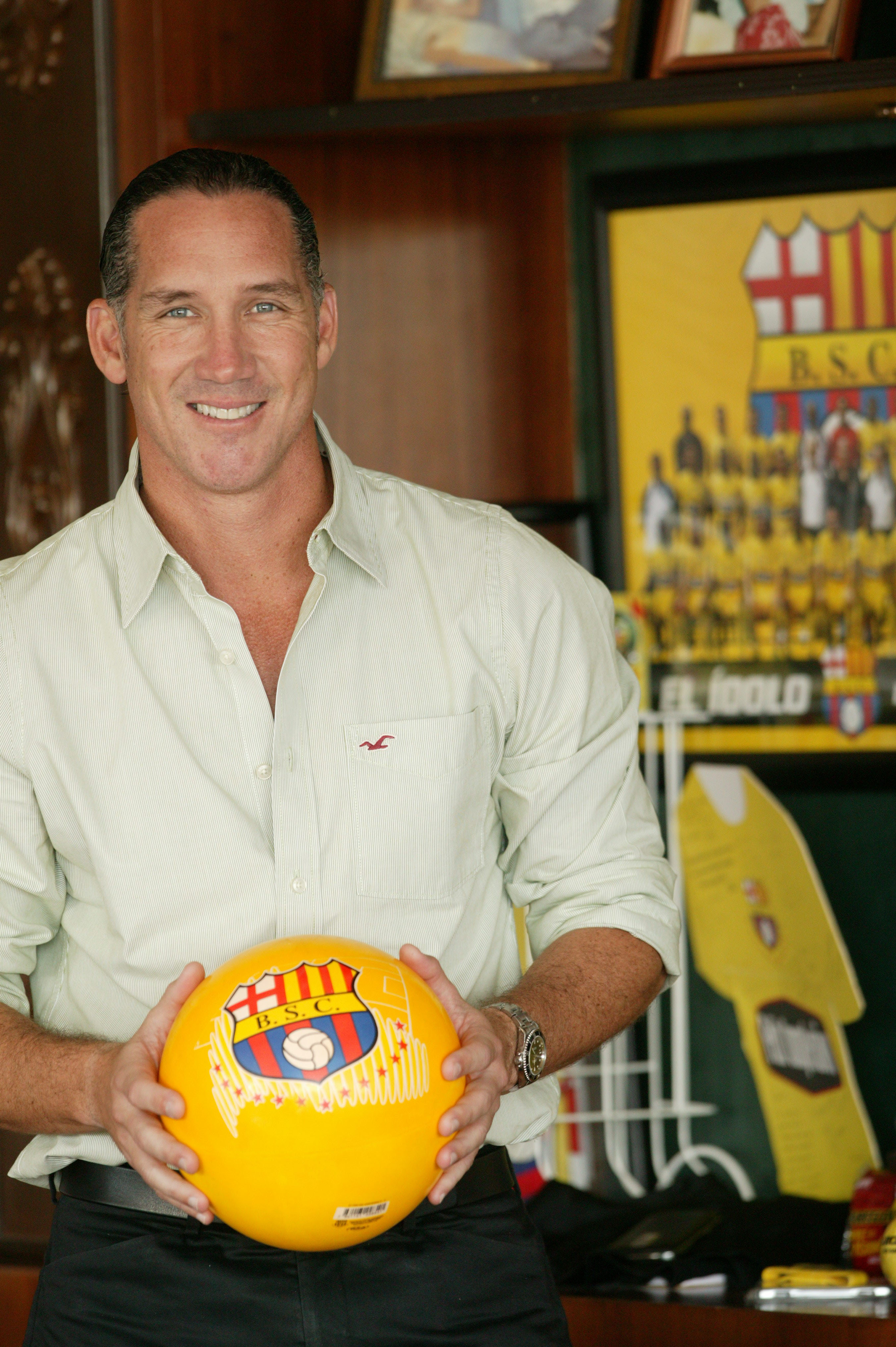

Personal details
- Born: 6 September 1966 (age 60) Guayaquil, Ecuador

Eduardo Maruri Miranda (born 6 September 1966) is an Ecuadorian businessman and creative leader who is currently President & CEO Europe, as well as Vice President of the Global Creative Board, at Grey Global Group. His latest achievements include being named Campaign Magazine’s EMEA Agency Head of the Year 2020 and being appointed Goals Jury President at the Cannes Lions Festival of Creativity ‘20/21.

Maruri is a global speaker in creative and environmental topics and has participated in conferences all over Latin America, Dublin, Cambodia, Spain, among others.

== Previously ==
Until December 2018, Maruri was President & CEO of Grey Latin America, as well as President and Chief Creative Officer of Maruri Grey Ecuador, the agency he founded in 1991.

Prior to opening his own agency, Eduardo worked for The Gillette Company in Ecuador and in Boston.

An active member of his community, and a former Congressman, he contributed to the drafting of the current Ecuadorian Constitution, the first one in the world to grant rights to nature. Between 2008 and 2010 he was President of Barcelona Sporting Club, the most popular soccer team in Ecuador. Under Maruri's management, the team was almost relegated to the second division for the first time in its history during the 2009 Campeonato Ecuatoriano de Fútbol Serie A season.

In 2004, he had become the youngest person to be elected President of the Guayaquil Chamber of Commerce and also unanimously voted President of The National Federation of Ecuadorian Chambers of Commerce.

Maruri accumulated a vast number of creative accolades, including 161 Cannes Lions Awards constituting 2 Grand Prix, making him one of the most renowned creative leaders in the world.

He was acknowledged by Ad Latina as one of the 10 most important executives in Latin America and for several occasions has been ranked in the 100 most respected businessmen in Ecuador by Vistazo Magazine.

Maruri has also been Jury President at El Ojo de Iberoamérica, FIAP, New York Festivals, and Clio Award].

Maruri, who is a member of the Board of Director of Sambito - the leading company for environmental solutions in Ecuador- is also co-founder of Latin America Green Awards (Premios Latinoamerica Verde). This yearly event acknowledges the best 500 social and environmental practices in the region.

In 2012, Maruri and Sambito organized the International Environmental Summit, obtaining a Guinness World Record for recycling the largest number of plastic bottles in one week.

Maruri earned a degree in Economics from Eastern Michigan University, a CSA in Marketing from Harvard University, a post-graduate Degree in Integrated Marketing Communications from Berkeley, and an MBA from the Berlin School of Creative Leadership.

A keen sportsman, he has completed the Ironman Triathlon and several Marathons. He played semi-professional baseball, he enjoys rowing, scuba diving and surfing.

== Maruri Grey Ecuador ==
In 1991, along with his father, Jimmy Maruri, he founded Maruri Publicidad (nowadays called Maruri GREY Ecuador), a creative agency focused on Communication Services and Advertising, ATL, BTL, Production, Digital, PR, Marketing, Planning and Research, among other services.

Maruri Grey Ecuador, the agency he founded back in 1991 is the most creative agency in Ecuador, and the first Ecuadorian advertising agency to receive a Gold Lion at the Cannes Lions International Festival of Creativity in 2012. From 2013 to 2018 Maruri Grey accumulated 40 Cannes Lions.

Named Ecuadorian Agency of the Year in more than 10 occasions, Maruri Grey is the most awarded agency at El Cóndor, Ecuador’s local creative festival.

== Barcelona Sporting Club ==
He was elected President of the Barcelona Sporting Club soccer team from Guayaquil for the 2007-2011 period. In the 2008 season Maruri led the team to a 5th place in the Ecuadorian Serie A. On December 22, 2010 Maruri resigned the presidency of Barcelona after a surprise press conference alongside his family and fellow friends. Maruri stated that he was leaving Barcelona due to "Family issues", then Maruri said,"We were born to be champions, I'm not the man who abandons his ship in a horrible thunderstorm and is about to be sunken underwater, I know better days will come for Barcelona".

== Additional Data ==
In 2004, Eduardo Maruri won the Elections for the Presidency of the Chamber of Commerce of Guayaquil. He was the Youngest President in the history of that Institution. In his two years of management, the number of affiliated companies doubled, and 90% of these scored his work as excellent.

Later, in 2006, he was elected unanimously as the President of the National Federation of Chambers of Commerce of Ecuador, by the 85 Chambers of the country.

"Lideres" Magazine described him as one of the most respected businessmen of Ecuador and "Latin Finance" magazine highlighted him as the only Ecuadorian between the Top 25 Latin American Businessmen able to take over important offices over the next 10 years. Maruri was the Vice President of the Political Party "Una Nueva Opción-UNO". In September 2007, he was elected to be a part of the National Assembly of Ecuador, being the top voted candidate of his city, Guayaquil. On November of the same year, he won the Presidency of Barcelona Sporting Club, one of the most important Soccer Teams of Ecuador, and managed to get the team to succeed at Basketball.

- Director, Junta Cívica de Guayaquil.
- Director, Hospital de Niños León Becerra.
- Marketing and Sales Teacher in several Universities.
- Director, Corporación de Seguridad Ciudadana de Guayaquil.
- Speaker of Political Communications George Washington University.
- Part of the Baseball National Team
- Triathlon and Ironman Champion in 2002.

== See also ==
- List of marathoners who are non-running specialists
- List of Ecuadorian Ironman
