= Isabelle Ledoux-Rak =

French physicist

- Born: 12 June 1957 (age 68)
- Awards: Fernand Holweck Medal and Prize, Yves Rocard Prize of the French Physical Society, Prize of the Physical Chemistry Division of the French Chemical Society
- Scientific career
- Fields: Non-linear optics, optoelectronics, photonics
- Institutions: École normale supérieure Paris-Saclay
- Thesis: Effets paramétriques du second ordre dans des composés organiques à forte non linéarité optique : solutions, cristaux massifs, couches minces (Second order parametric effects in organic compounds with a high optical non-linearity : solutions, bulk crystal, thin films)
- Doctoral advisor: Joseph Zyss

Isabelle Ledoux-Rak (born 1957) is a French physicist and Professor at the École Normale Supérieure Paris-Saclay, where she is director of the Quantum and Molecular Photonics Laboratory (LPQM - UMR CNRS 8537) and coordinator of the Erasmus Mundus Master's degree. Her research interests focus on the study of the non-linear optical properties of molecules and nanomaterials.

== Education ==
Ledoux-Rak studied chemistry and physical sciences at the École normale supérieure de jeunes filles, and joined the Ecole Nationale Superieure des Telecommunications to study engineering in 1981. She obtained a Ph.D. in physics from the Centre National d'Études des Télécommunications (CNET) at Bagneux in 1988, under the supervision of Joseph Zyss. Her thesis studied the non-linear optical properties of organic molecules and was distinguished with the Prize of the Physical Chemistry Division of the French Society of Chemistry.

== Research and career ==
Ledoux-Rak continued her postdoctoral research in non-linear optics at CNET until joining the École Normale Supérieure (ENS) Paris-Saclay (formerly Cachan) in 1998, where she was involved with founding the Quantum and Molecular Photonics Laboratory (LPQM) with her former supervisor, Joseph Zyss.

She has been a professor of physics at ENS Paris-Saclay since 2002, and director of the LPQM since 2006.

== Awards and honours ==
In 2015, Ledoux-Rak was awarded the Fernand Holweck Medal and Prize for her research on the non-linear optical properties of metal complexes and the detection of optical amplification phenomena at telecom wavelengths in polymer-based waveguides. She and Zyss also jointly received the Yves Rocard Prize of the French Physical Society for instrumentation in 1996.
