= Malika Haimeur =

French engineer and chemist

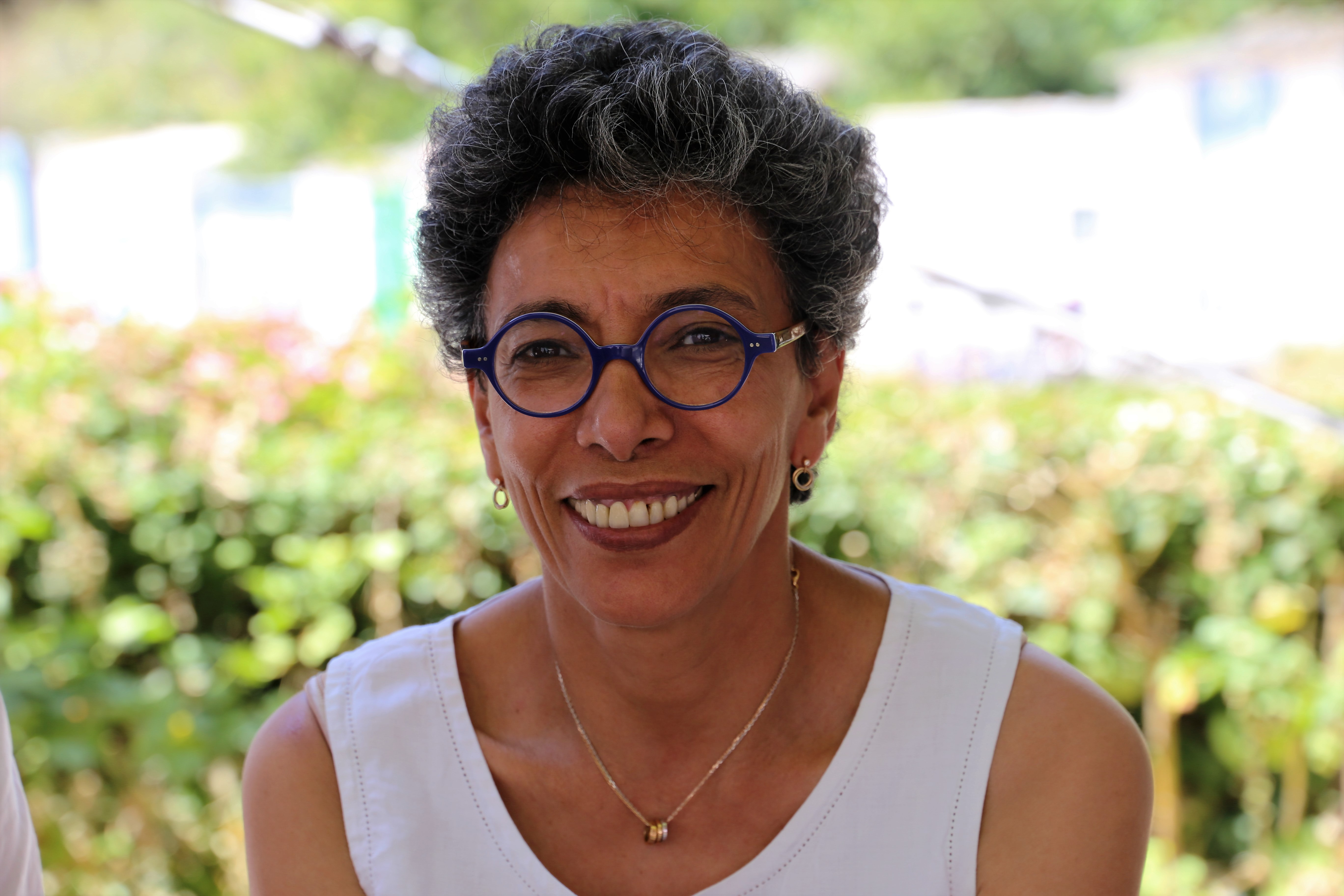
- Born: 7 September 1956 (age 69); Le Rove, France
- Education: École Centrale de Marseille
- Occupations: Engineer and chemist
- Known for: Irène Joliot-Curie Prize

Malika Haimeur (born 7 September 1956) is a French engineer and chemist and winner of the Irène Joliot-Curie Prize for Women & Business in 2009. She was named a Knight of the Legion of Honor in 2012.

== Life and career ==
Malika Haimeur was born in Le Rove, in the Bouches du Rhône region of France. She passed a scientific baccalaureate, then a license and a master 's degree in chemistry. She continued her studies at the Institute of Petrochemistry and Industrial Organic Synthesis, now the École Centrale de Marseille, where she received her engineering degree in 1984.

In 1984, she began her career working in a chemical process development laboratory of the Rhône-Poulenc group in Décines.

After a career in research and development within the Rhône Poulenc group, which became Aventis and then Sanofi Aventis, from 2007 she managed the production sites of Mourenx and Sisteron of the pharmaceutical group Sanofi. The Sisteron site is one of the largest in the Provence-Alpes-Côte d'Azur (PACA) region in the field of pharmaceutical chemistry. In 2010, this site produced approximately 750 to 800 tons per year of about 15 active ingredients for medicines. Haimeur was responsible for nearly a thousand people, and managed, among other things, purchasing, shipping and security of the site for the manufacturing the active ingredients for drugs such as Clopidogrel, which is sold as Plavix.

In 2011, she was promoted to vice-president of the research and development sector of the Sanofi group. She held that position until 2015.

As of June 2017, she has been President of the board of directors of the National School of Chemistry of Rennes. In 2018, she became an independent director of the Savencia dairy company.

== Awards and distinctions ==
- 2008: Knight of the National Order of Merit
- 2009: Irène Joliot-Curie Prize, women in business category for her "scientific and technological excellence at research"
- 2012: Knight of the Legion of Honor

== Selected works ==
- Marrakchi, Hmaïd, Jean-Baptiste Nguini Effa, Malika Haimeur, Joseph Lieto, and Jean-Pierre Aune. "Polymer-supported anionic tri-osmium and tri-iron cluster catalysts for alkene hydroformylation." Journal of molecular catalysis 30, no. 1-2 (1985): 101–109.
