= List of non-professional marathon runners =

This is a sortable table of notable people known for their accomplishments outside of long-distance running who have completed an organized marathon. For elite athletes and others known primarily for running marathons, see List of marathoners or Category:Long-distance runners. Some of these people have competed in more than one marathon or other running events.

This article lists the time and location of each person's fastest time in the marathon.

== Table ==
In the table below, the penultimate column, "Link to Race Results," includes links to databases of race results; this is the reference for verifiability and accuracy of the entry. The last column provides references to the marathoner in the context of celebrity and notability.

Name	Field	Notability	Year	Marathon	Result	Link to Race Results	Other Source
Gbenga Akinnagbe	acting	The Wire, The Deuce	2011	New York City Marathon	4:53:52	NYRR	
Pamela Anderson	acting	Baywatch, V.I.P.	2013	New York City Marathon	5:41:03	NYRR	
Sean Astin	acting		1998	Los Angeles Marathon	4:04:42	Athlinks	
Tony Audenshaw	acting	Emmerdale	2012	Amsterdam Marathon	3:08:38		
Scott Bakula	acting		2004	Rock ‘n’ Roll Marathon	4:08:34	MarathonGuide	
William Baldwin	acting		1992	New York City Marathon	3:24:29	NYRR	
Andrea Barber	acting	Full House	2015	Phoenix Marathon	4:43:17		
Meredith Baxter	acting		1982	New York City Marathon	4:08:30	NYRR by then-married name (Birney)	
Valerie Bertinelli	acting		2010	Boston Marathon	5:14:37	MarathonGuide	
Katrina Bowden	acting		2015	New York Marathon	4:17:23		
Drew Carey	acting	The Drew Carey Show, The Price Is Right	2011	Marine Corps Marathon	4:37:11	Athlinks	
Jennifer Carpenter	acting		2010	New York City Marathon	3:34:27	NYRR	
Dana Carvey	acting	Saturday Night Live	1972	Ocean to Bay Marathon	3:04:21		
Tom Cavanagh	acting		2006	New York City Marathon	3:29:31	NYRR	
Bryan Cranston	acting		1985	New York City Marathon	3:20:45	NYRR	
Christopher Eccleston	acting		2012	London Marathon	4:17:43	London Marathon under the name "Chris Ecclestone"	
Anthony Edwards	acting		2003	Chicago Marathon	3:55:40	Chicago Marathon	
Bruce Dern	acting		1965	Western Hemisphere Marathon	3:20:45	RRCA archive	
Natalie Dormer	acting		2016	London Marathon	3:51:21	London Marathon archive	
David James Elliott	acting		2000	Boston Marathon	4:57:23		
Will Ferrell	acting		2003	Boston Marathon	3:56:12	MarathonGuide	
Teri Hatcher	acting		2014	New York City Marathon	5:06:42	MarathonGuide	
Kevin Hart	acting		2017	New York City Marathon	4:05:06	NYRR	
Katie Holmes	acting		2007	New York City Marathon	5:29:58	NYRR	
Ethan Hawke	acting		2015	New York City Marathon	4:25:30	TCS New York City Marathon Results	
John Keston	acting		1996	Twin Cities Marathon	3:00:58	Athlinks	
Ashton Kutcher	acting		2022	New York City Marathon	3:54:01	NYRR	
Shia LaBeouf	acting		2010	Los Angeles Marathon	4:35:31	Athlinks	
Mario López	acting		2011	New York City Marathon	4:23:29	NYRR	
Jonny Lee Miller	acting		2008	London Marathon	3:01:40	Athlinks	
Edward Norton	acting		2009	New York City Marathon	3:48:01	NYRR	
Freddie Prinze, Jr.	acting		2006	Los Angeles Marathon	5:50:49	Athlinks as Freddie James	
Ryan Reynolds	acting		2008	New York City Marathon	3:50:22	NYRR	
Rob Riggle	acting		2016	Chicago Marathon	5:33:52		
Milind Soman	acting		2012	Mumbai Marathon	3:56:53	Athlinks	
Joan Van Ark	acting		1979	Santa Ana/Orange Marathon	3:35:00		
Peter Weller	acting		1988	New York City Marathon	3:51:26	NYRR	
Andy Baldwin	television	The Bachelor	2011	New York City Marathon	3:17:31	NYRR	
Joe Bastianich	television	MasterChef	2009	New York City Marathon	3:42:36	NYRR	
Przemysław Babiarz (pl)	television	Jeopardy!	2010	New York City Marathon	4:13:25	NYRR	
Richard Blais	television	Top Chef: All Stars	2011	New York City Marathon	4:31:54	NYRR	
Danni Boatwright	television	Survivor: Guatemala	2003	Country Music Marathon	4:23:24		
Bobby Flay	television	celebrity chef, host of numerous Food Network shows	2010	New York City Marathon	4:01:37	NYRR	
Shannon Bream	television	Fox News	2001	Pittsburgh Marathon	5:11:00		
Ana Cabrera	television	CNN	2022	New York City Marathon	2:57:11	NYRR	
Charlie Gibson	television	ABC News	1983	Marine Corps Marathon	3:43:24		
Mary Katharine Ham	newspaper	AT&T, Inc.	2011	Marine Corps Marathon	4:22:14		
Amanda Holden	television	Britain's Got Talent	2008	London Marathon	4:13:22	Athlinks	
Anna Kooiman	television	Studio 10	2008	Glass City Marathon	3:27:22	MarathonGuide	
Ted Koppel	television	Nightline	1983	Marine Corps Marathon	5:09:08		
Lisa Ling	television	The View	2002	Boston Marathon	4:34:18		
Suzanne Malveaux	television	CNN	2004	Marine Corps Marathon	6:05:32	Athlinks	
Natalie Morales	television	Today	2006	New York City Marathon	3:31:02	MarathonGuide	
Casey Neistat	television	Neistat Brothers	2023	Tucson Marathon	2:57:34	Athlinks	
Gordon Ramsay	television	Hell's Kitchen	2004	London Marathon	3:30:37	MarathonGuide	
Bill Rancic	television	The Apprentice	2001	Chicago Marathon	4:31:31	Athlinks as Billy the Kid Rancic	
Romesh Ranganathan	television	the Ranganation	2024	London Marathon	6:35:21		
Sophie Raworth	television	BBC News	2019	Valencia Marathon	3:27:01	Results	
Al Roker	television	Today	2010	New York City Marathon	7:09:44	NYRR	
Jimmy Savile	television	Jim'll Fix It	1983	London Marathon	3:33:59		
Ryan Sutter	television	The Bachelorette	2011	New York City Marathon	3:17:56	NYRR	
Meredith Vieira	television	The View	2010	New York City Marathon	5:59:00	NYRR	
Joe Wilkinson	television	8 out of 10 cats	2022	Brighton Marathon	4:30:25		
Oprah Winfrey	television	The Oprah Winfrey Show	1994	Marine Corps Marathon	4:29:20		
Ethan Zohn	television	The Amazing Race	2010	New York City Marathon	4:16:20	NYRR	
Chris Evans	radio		2017	London Marathon	4:41:06		
Jenni Falconer	radio		2015	London Marathon	3:54:53	Results	
Greg James	radio		2015	London Marathon	4:26:32	Results	
Robin Quivers	radio		2010	New York City Marathon	6:09:00	NYRR	
Peter Sagal	radio		2011	Philadelphia Marathon	3:09:25	Athlinks	
Sean Combs	music		2003	New York City Marathon	4:14:52	NYRR	
Michael Balzary	music	"Flea" of Red Hot Chili Peppers	2012	Los Angeles Marathon	3:41:49	Athlinks	
Gunter Gabriel	music	German singer	1983	New York City Marathon	4:29:57	NYRR	
Ben Gibbard	music	Death Cab for Cutie	2011	Los Angeles Marathon	3:56:34	MarathonGuide	
Dan Hawkins	music	The Darkness	2019	London Marathon	3:21:44	Virgin London Marathon	
Nick Hexum	music	311	2006	Los Angeles Marathon	5:29:44		
Dexter Holland	music	The Offspring	2007	Los Angeles Marathon	5:21:24	Athlinks	
Katherine Jenkins	music	mezzo-soprano	2013	London Marathon	5:26:42		
John Joseph	music	Cro-Mags	2007	Marine Corps Marathon	4:20:41		
Harry Judd	music	McFly	2024	London Marathon	3:23:40	Results	
Ronan Keating	music	Boyzone	2008	London Marathon	3:59:33	Athlinks	
Alicia Keys	music	singer, actress	2015	New York City Marathon	5:50:52	Runner's World	
Mike Malinin	music	Goo Goo Dolls	2000	San Francisco Marathon	3:23:56	MarathonGuide as Michael Malinin	
Johnny Marr	music	guitarist	2010	New York City Marathon	3:54:18	NYRR as John Marr	
Joey McIntyre	music	New Kids on the Block	2013	Boston Marathon	3:57:06	MarathonGuide as Joseph McIntyre	
Alanis Morissette	music		2009	Bizz Johnson Trail Marathon	4:17:03	MarathonGuide	
Stuart Murdoch	music	Belle and Sebastian	1986	Glasgow Marathon	2:57:08		
Lisette Oropesa	music	opera	2014	Toronto Marathon	4:15:57	MarathonGuide	
Josh Ritter	music		2006	New York City Marathon	3:54:46	MarathonGuide	
Jake Shimabukuro	music	ukulele virtuoso	2006	Honolulu Marathon	5:24:29	MarathonGuide	
Joe Strummer	music	the Clash	1982	Paris Marathon	4:13:00		
Harry Styles	music	One Direction	2025	Berlin Marathon	2:59:13	Results as Sted Sarandos	
Björn Ulvaeus	music	ABBA	1980	Stockholm Marathon	3:23:54		
Rolf Aldag	sports	cycling	2006	Hamburg Marathon	2:42:57		
Justin Allgaier	sports	motor racing 2024 NXS Champion	2024	Walt Disney World Marathon	4:18:32		
Mao Asada	sports	figure skating	2017	Honolulu Marathon	4:34:13		
Daniel Atienza	sports	cycling	2013	Zurich Marathon	2:29:27	Athlinks	
Tiki Barber	sports	American football	2015	New York City Marathon	4:50:56	MarathonGuide	
Kajsa Bergqvist	sports	high jump	2010	New York City Marathon	3:56:57	NYRR	
James Blake	sports	tennis	2015	New York City Marathon	3:51:19	Runner's World	
Chris Boardman	sports	cycling	2009	London Marathon	3:19:27	Athlinks	
Jenson Button	sports	Formula One	2015	London Marathon	2:52:30		
Bobby Carpenter	sports	ice hockey	2016	Boston Marathon	3:46:53		
Zdeno Chára	sports	ice hockey	2026	Boston Marathon	3:18:00	BAA	
Kane Cornes	sports	Australian Rules Football	2018	Melbourne Marathon	2:36:39		
James Cracknell	sports	rowing	2017	London Marathon	2:43:12		
Roger Craig	sports	American football	2005	Chicago Marathon	3:51:04	Athlinks	
Matt Dawson	sports	Rugby Union	2007	London Marathon	4:35:39		
Dan Mullen	sports	American football	2016	Boston Marathon	4:28:35		
Kimiko Date-Krumm	sports	tennis	2004	London Marathon	3:27:47		
Amer Delić	sports	tennis	2014	New York City Marathon	3:58:02	NYRR	
Bill Demong	sports	Nordic combined	2014	New York City Marathon	2:33:05	NYRR	
Luis Enrique	sports	association football	2007	Florence Marathon	2:58:08		
Jennie Finch	sports	softball	2011	New York City Marathon	4:05:26	NYRR	
Quinton Fortune	sports	Association football	2017	London Marathon	4:06:29		
Helen Glover	sports	rowing	2017	London Marathon	3:05:25		
Hunter Hillenmeyer	sports	American football	2015	Chicago Marathon	3:38:09		
Michael Hutchinson	sports	cycling	2017	London Marathon	3:01:22		
Laurent Jalabert	sports	cycling	2007	Barcelona Marathon	2:45:52	Athlinks	
Jimmie Johnson	sports	motor racing	2019	Boston Marathon	3:09:07		
Kaká	sports	Association football	2022	Berlin Marathon	3:38:06		
Matt Kenseth	sports	motor racing	2022	Boston Marathon	3:01:40		
Heikki Kovalainen	sports	Formula One	2007	New York City Marathon	3:36:56	NYRR	
Justin Leonard	sports	golf	2001	Dallas White Rock Marathon	3:54:19	MarathonGuide	
Amélie Mauresmo	sports	tennis	2012	Paris Marathon	3:16:49	Athlinks	
Jim McDonnell	sports	boxing	2003	London Marathon	2:50:54	Athlinks	
Jamie McMurray	sports	motorsport	2019	Last Chance BQ2 Marathon (Geneva, IL)	2:53:51	Results	
Leontien van Moorsel	sports	cycling	2008	Rotterdam Marathon	3:28:57	Athlinks	
Pavel Nedved	sports	football (soccer)	2012	Prague Marathon	3:49:51	Athlinks	
Apolo Ohno	sports	skating	2011	New York City Marathon	3:25:12	NYRR	
Abraham Olano	sports	cycling	2006	San Sebastian Marathon	2:39:19		
Kyle Petty	sports	NASCAR	2005	Las Vegas Marathon	4:18:34	MarathonGuide	
Thomas Rohregger	sports	cycling	2016	Vienna City Marathon	2:48:47		
Edwin van der Sar	sports	football (soccer)	2011	New York City Marathon	4:19:16	Athlinks	
Kerri Strug	sports	gymnastics	2008	New York City Marathon	3:56:06	NYRR	
Andrew Strauss	sports	cricket	2013	London Marathon	3:31:52		
Barbora Strýcová	sports	tennis	2026	Boston Marathon	3:12:51	BAA	
Lynn Swann	sports	American football	1993	New York City Marathon	4:26:41	NYRR	
Nick Symmonds	sports	800 metres	2017	Honolulu Marathon	3:00:35		
Pat Tillman	sports	American football	2000	Avenue of the Giants Marathon	3:48:48	MarathonGuide	
Amani Toomer	sports	American football	2010	New York City Marathon	4:13:45	NYRR	
James Toseland	sports	Superbikes	2013	London Marathon	3:03:11	Athlinks	
Jarno Trulli	sports	Formula One	2000	New York City Marathon	4:00:28	NYRR	
Ed Viesturs	sports	mountaineering	2006	New York City Marathon	3:15:18	NYRR	
Vanessa O'Brien	sports	mountaineering	2017	Boston Marathon	5:16:00	MarathonGuide	
Michael Waltrip	sports	racing driver	2005	Las Vegas Marathon	3:56:52	MarathonGuide	
Mats Wilander	sports	tennis	1997	New York City Marathon	4:19:19	NYRR	
Caroline Wozniacki	sports	tennis	2014	New York City Marathon	3:26:33	NYRR	
Adam Yates	sports	cycling	2021	Barcelona Marathon	2:58:43		
Joop Zoetemelk	sports	cycling	2010	Paris Marathon	4:08:52	Athlinks	
Kim Alexis	modeling		1991	New York City Marathon	3:52:00	NYRR	
Ali Landry	modeling		2002	Boston Marathon	5:41:41		
Nell McAndrew	modeling		2012	London Marathon	2:54:39	Athlinks	
Beth Ostrosky	modeling		2008	New York City Marathon	4:15:39	NYRR	
Christy Turlington	modeling		2011	New York City Marathon	4:20:46	NYRR	
Siera Bearchell	modeling	Miss Universe Canada	2016	Saskatchewan Marathon	4:45:15	Sportstats	-|
Karlie Kloss	modeling		2017	New York City Marathon	4:41:50	NYRR	
Max Baucus	government	U.S. Senate	1982	Governor's Cup Marathon	3:01:18		
Jill Biden	government	U.S. First Lady	1998	Marine Corps Marathon	4:30:02	Athlinks	
L. Paul Bremer	government	American diplomat	1991	Boston Marathon	3:00:34		
George W. Bush	government	U.S. President	1993	Houston Marathon	3:44:52	Athlinks as G W Bush	
Alun Cairns	government	British Member of Parliament	2014	London Marathon	3:34:08		
Brian Calley	government	Lt. Governor of Michigan	2013	Detroit Marathon	4:31:47	MarathonGuide	
Alastair Campbell	government	British politician	2003	London Marathon	3:53:45	Athlinks	
Mark Carney	government	Prime Minister of Canada	2015	London Marathon	3:31:35	Results	
Melvin Carter	government	Mayor of Saint Paul Minnesota	2024	Twin Cities Marathon	3:44:03		
Andrew Leigh	government	Australian politician and economist	2017	Tokyo Marathon	2:42:48		
Michael Dukakis	government	Governor of Massachusetts	1951	Boston Marathon	3:31:00		
Mikuláš Dzurinda	government	Prime Minister of Slovakia	1986	Malokarpatsky Marathon	2:54:57		
John Edwards	government	U.S. Senate	1983	Marine Corps Marathon	3:30:18		
Joschka Fischer	government	German Foreign Minister	1998	Hamburg Marathon	3:41:36		
Frederik	government	Crown Prince of Denmark later King of Denmark	1994	Copenhagen Marathon	3:06:49		
Jacob Frey	government	Mayor of Minneapolis, Minnesota	2021	Twin Cities Marathon	2:53:22		
Bill Frist	government	U.S. Senate	2000	Marine Corps Marathon	4:46:12	Athlinks as William Frist	
Al Gore	government	U.S. Vice President	1997	Marine Corps Marathon	4:58:25	Athlinks as Albert Gore	
Jörg Haider	government	Austrian politician	1997	Vienna City Marathon	3:33:19	Athlinks	
Matt Hancock	government	British Politician	2024	London Marathon	3:55:37		
Mike Huckabee	government	Governor of Arkansas	2005	Marine Corps Marathon	4:37:29	Athlinks	
Jeremy Hunt	government	British Politician	2024	London Marathon	05:44:33		
Eduardo Maruri	government	Ecuadorian politician	2005	Guayaquil Marathon	3:59:03		
Greg Mulholland	government	British politician	2009	Belfast Marathon	3:18:50		
Sarah Palin	government	Governor of Alaska	2005	Humpy's Classic Marathon	3:59:36	MarathonGuide	
Matthew Parris	government	British politician	1985	London Marathon	2:32:57		
Tim Pawlenty	government	Governor of Minnesota	2004-2005	Twin Cities Marathon	3:57:52, 3:43		
David Petraeus	government	U.S. Army General	1982	Omaha Marathon	2:50:53		
Harry Reid	government	U.S. Senate	1972	Boston Marathon	3:16		
Paul Ryan	government	U.S. House	1990	Grandma's Marathon	4:01:25		
Jim Scheibel	government	Mayor of Saint Paul, Minnesota	1988-1992	Twin Cities Marathon	2:52.25		
Eliot Spitzer	government	Governor of New York	1983	New York City Marathon	3:58:43	NYRR	
Alexander Stubb	government	Prime Minister of Finland later President of Finland	2014	Berlin Marathon	3:11:23	Athlinks	
Clarence Thomas	government	U.S. Supreme Court	1980	Marine Corps Marathon	3:11:00		(noted "unofficial")
Arne Treholt	government	Norwegian politician	1982	New York City Marathon	2:54:05	Athlinks	
Dominique de Villepin	government	French Prime Minister	1980	Marathon de l’Essonne	2:57:06		
Tom Vilsack	government	Governor of Iowa	2005	Marathon-to-Marathon	5:03:09	MarathonGuide	
Willem-Alexander	government	Crown Prince of the Netherlands later King of the Netherlands	1992	New York City Marathon	4:27:00	NYRR (Bib 18756)	
Taavi Rõivas	government	Prime Minister of Estonia	2013	Marathon Popular de Valencia	3:52:10	Carreraspopulares	
Abdelkader Benali	literature	Moroccan-Dutch writer	2006	Rotterdam Marathon	2:52:25	Athlinks	
Benjamin Cheever	literature	American writer	1981	New York City Marathon	2:58:35	Athlinks	
Günter Herburger	literature	German writer	1984	Berlin Marathon	3:04:34	Results	
Haruki Murakami	literature	Japanese Author	1991	New York City Marathon	3:31:26	NYRR	
Eugen Ruge	literature	German writer	2006	Wuhlheide Marathon	3:03:51		
Erich Segal	literature	American writer	1964	Boston Marathon	2:56:30		
Günter Wallraff	literature	German writer	1983	Frankfurt Marathon	2:50:14		
Martin Gruebele	science	scientist	2013	California International Marathon	3:10:34	MarathonGuide	
Bernd Heinrich	science	biologist	1980	West Valley Marathon	2:22:34		
Wolfgang Ketterle	science	Nobel Prize winner	2014	Boston Marathon	2:44:06	MarathonGuide	
Daniel Lieberman	science	paleoanthropologist	2016	Boston Marathon	3:34:21		
Alan Turing	science	mathematician, cryptologist	1947	Amateur Athletic Championships	2:46:03		
Shinya Yamanaka	science	Nobel Prize winner	2012	Tokyo Marathon	4:03:19		
Jared Fogle	—	convict	2010	New York City Marathon	5:13:28	NYRR	
Christer Fuglesang	—	Swedish astronaut	1987	Stockholm Marathon	3:15:05		
Karl-Erivan Haub	—	businessman	2000	New York Marathon	4:09:00	Athlinks	
Daniel "Swampy" Hooper	—	environmentalist	2010	Snowdonia Marathon	3:10:49	Run Britain	
Pippa Middleton	—	socialite	2015	Safaricom Marathon	3:56:33		
Dambisa Moyo	—	economist	2015	London Marathon	5:18:43		
Edison Peña	—	rescued Chilean miner	2010	New York City Marathon	5:40:51	NYRR	
Volker Schlöndorff	—	German film-maker	2008	Paris Marathon	4:37:41	Athlinks as Volker Schloendorff	
Guido van der Werve	—	Dutch conceptual artist	2013	Berlin Marathon	2:57:06	Athlinks	
Oz Pearlman	—	American magician	2014	Philadelphia Marathon	2:23:52		
Liam Knight	sports	AFL, Cricket	2022	Melbourne Marathon	4:59:58		
Erben Wennemars	sports	Speed skater	2021	Rotterdam Marathon	2:47:43		
Arjen Robben	sports	football (soccer)	2022	Rotterdam Marathon	3:13:40		

== Notes ==
Eddie Izzard ran the equivalent of 43 marathons in 51 days in 2009, though none of these was an organized marathon.

In 2007, Hamish Blake reportedly ran the length of a marathon around a track in Melbourne, "in an attempt to beat Katie Holmes' marathon time. He succeeded, in a time of 5:25:00."

Joe Strummer guitarist and lead vocalist for punk band the Clash, claimed to have run the Paris Marathon in 1982; no records exist of his attempt or finish.
