= Marina Galand =

Atmospheric physicist and lecturer

Marina Galand is a planetary scientist and professor at Imperial College London. She is the 2018 recipient of the Holweck Prize for her "outstanding contribution to space physics by studying in a comprehensive and original manner the effects of energy sources on planetary atmospheres throughout the Solar System and beyond".

== Education ==
Galand grew up in France and studied at the Université Joseph Fourier in Grenoble. There she completed a PhD in 1996 entitled "Transport des protons dans l'ionosphère aurorale". Galand completed two postdoctoral fellowships in Boulder, Colorado, in the Space Environment Centre (NOAA) and High Altitude Observatory (NCAR). She joined Boston University as a Research Associate in 2000.

== Research ==
In 2005, Galand joined Imperial College London as a lecturer in the Space and Atmospheric Physics Group. She became a Reader in 2016.

Galand develops kinetic and fluid models to predict and interpret the observations from space probes, including Rosetta, Cassini-Huygens, and Venus Express. She used data from the recent Rosetta mission to comet 67P to fully determine the ion composition and make-up of cometary plasma around the nucleus. At the end of the 20-year Cassini mission, Galand expressed her excitement for the data, "...we are deeply excited by the dataset which Cassini has been returning over the past weeks due to its uniqueness (e.g., first ever in situ gas and plasma measurements in the upper atmosphere of a giant planet). This dataset is filled with unanticipated findings".

Today she is a co-investigator for the plasma and UV instruments for the European Space Agency JUICE (Jupiter Icy Moons Explorer) 2022 mission, which will target the moon Ganymede.

== Awards and fellowships ==
- 2005: Elected Fellow of the Royal Astronomical Society
- 2006: Zeldovich Medal from the Committee on Space Research
- 2017: Elected Fellow of the Institute of Physics
- 2017: Imperial College London Student Academic Choice Awards Best Teaching for Undergraduates
- 2018: Fernand Holweck Medal and Prize, Institute of Physics and the French Physical Society
- 2023: Royal Astronomical Society James Dungey Lecture

== Public engagement ==
Galand is involved with activities to increase the public's interest in space science. She participated to “A Comet Revealed” at the Royal Society Summer Exhibition in 2016 and “Catch A Comet” in 2014. Her research group has also run stands at the Imperial College Festival, which recently celebrated the finale of the Cassini spacecraft.
