= Oriol Bohigas Martí =

Spanish physicist

Oriol Bohigas i Martí (22 December 1937 – 22 October 2013) was a Spanish and French physicist.

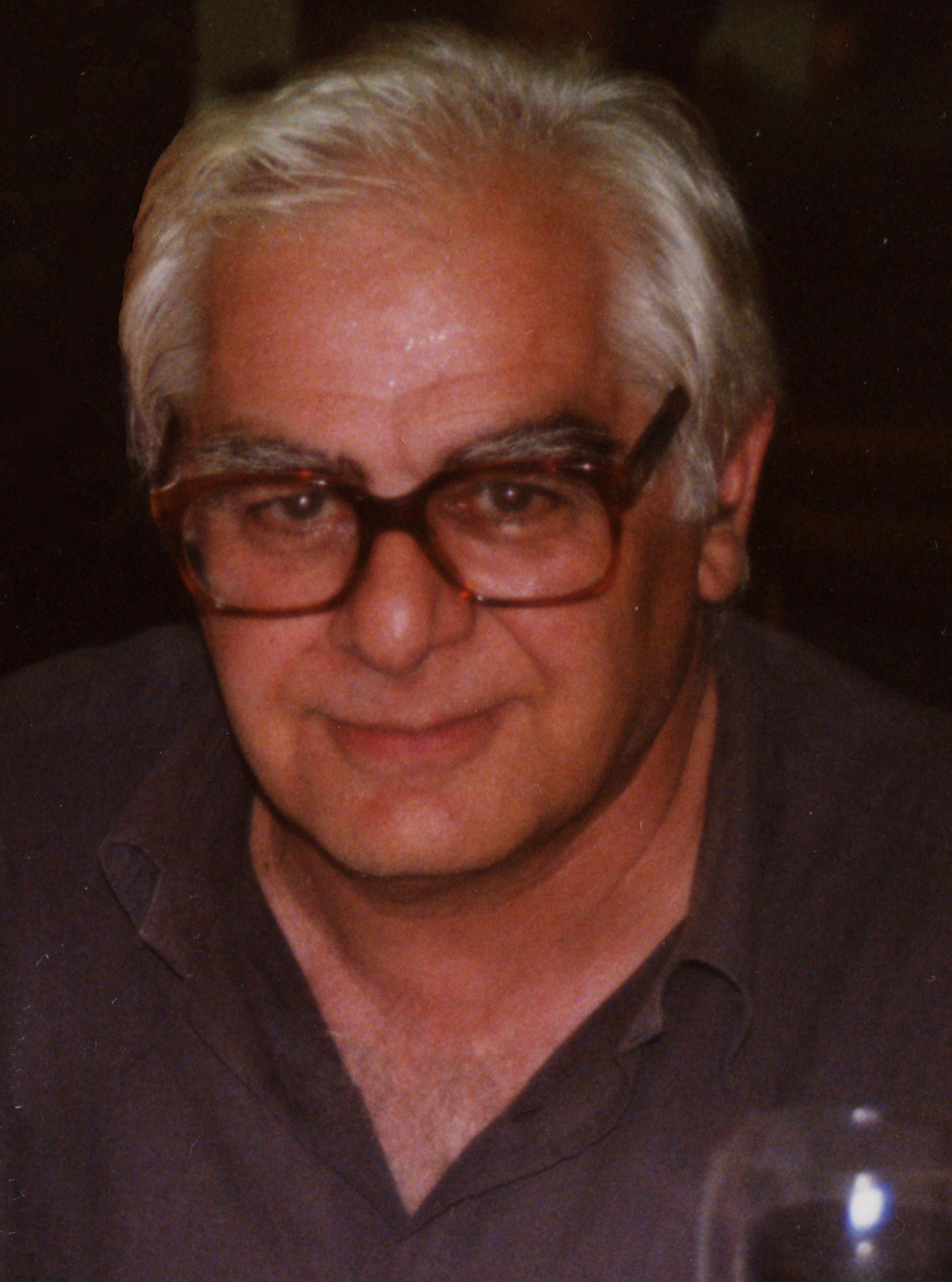
Oriol Bohigas i Martí, July 17, 1998

Bohigas was born in Barcelona, where he studied physics at the university. In 1966 he became researcher at France's CNRS, where he would stay until the end of his career, becoming Director of Research Emeritus at the LPTMS laboratory (Laboratoire de Physique Théorique et Modèles Statistiques), of which he was one of the founders, at Université de Paris-Sud in Orsay. Before that, he had been head of the Division of Theoretical Physics of the Institute of Nuclear Physics (IPN), on the campus of the same university. He died in Orsay.

His fundamental contributions to the theory of quantum chaos and its applications, particularly in nuclear physics, granted him the Gay-Lussac-Humboldt Prize (1991), the Holweck Medal (1999), and an honoris causa doctorate by the Technische Universität Darmstadt, among other recognitions.

== Publications ==
- Bohigas, O.; Lane, A. M.; Martorell, J (1979), "Sum rules for nuclear collective excitations", Physics Reports, 51 (5): 267–316, Bibcode:1979PhR....51..267B, doi:10.1016/0370-1573(79)90079-6
- Bohigas, O.; Giannoni, M.-J.; Schmit, C (1984), "Characterization of chaotic quantum spectra and universality of level fluctuation laws", Physical Review Letters, 52 (1): 1–4, Bibcode:1984PhRvL..52....1B, doi:10.1103/PhysRevLett.52.1
- Bohigas, O.; Giannoni, M.-J (1984), "Chaotic motion and random matrix theories", in Dehesa, J.S.; Gómez, J.M.G.; Polls, A. (eds.), Mathematical and computational methods in nuclear physics, Lecture Notes in Physics, vol. 209, Berlin, Heidelberg: Springer-Verlag, pp. 1–99, doi:10.1007/3-540-13392-5, ISBN 978-3-540-13392-6
- Bohigas, O.; Weidenmuller, H. A (1988), "Aspects of chaos in nuclear physics", Annual Review of Nuclear and Particle Science, 38 (38): 421–453, Bibcode:1988ARNPS..38..421B, doi:10.1146/annurev.ns.38.120188.002225
- Bohigas, O.; Tomsovic, S.; Ullmo, D (1993), "Manifestations of classical phase space structures in quantum mechanics", Physics Reports, 223 (2): 43–133, Bibcode:1993PhR...223...43B, doi:10.1016/0370-1573(93)90109-Q
- Bogomolny, E.; Bohigas, O.; Leboeuf, P (1996), "Quantum chaotic dynamics and random polynomials", Journal of Statistical Physics, 85 (5–6): 639–679, arXiv:chao-dyn/9604001, Bibcode:1996JSP....85..639B, doi:10.1007/BF02199359, S2CID 12324335
