= Zoran Hadzibabic =

Serbian-American physicist

Zoran Hadzibabic (Serbian: Zoran Hadžibabić, born 1974) is a Serbian-British physicist and Professor of Physics at the University of Cambridge. He completed his PhD at the Massachusetts Institute of Technology in 2003 under the supervision of Wolfgang Ketterle. Following postdoctoral research at the École Normale Supérieure in Paris, he joined the Cavendish Laboratory at Cambridge in 2007.

In 2016, Hadzibabic received the Fernand Holweck Medal and Prize in recognition of his experiments on the control of ultracold quantum degenerate gases. He is a Fellow of the American Physical Society.
