= Centrale Méditerranée =

Engineering education in France

Coordinates: 43°20′29″N 5°26′17″E

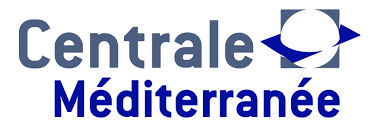
- Motto: Nous avons un monde à transformer
- Motto in English: We have a world to transform
- Type: Public, Graduate engineering
- Established: 1891
- Founder: Jules Macé de Lepinay
- Academic affiliations: Centrale Graduate School, Top Industrial Managers for Europe
- Budget: 24 000 000 €
- Director: Carole Deumié
- Students: 1200 (2023)
- Location: Marseille, France
- Website: Official website

Centrale Méditerranée (French pronunciation: [sɑ̃tʁal meditɛʁane]; Occitan: Centrala Mediterranèa), formerly known as École Centrale de Marseille ([ekɔl sɑ̃tʁal də maʁsɛj]; Occitan: Escòla Centrala de Marselha), is a graduate school of engineering (or Grande école of engineering) located in Marseille, the second largest city in France. Centrale Méditerranée (also called Centrale Med, ECM or simply Centrale) was created in 2006 by the merging of different previous institutions and has its origins from the École d'Ingénieurs de Marseille founded in 1891. As a successor school of the latter, it is one of the oldest French engineering Grande école, and ranks amongst the best engineering schools of France.

It is one of the prestigious Centrale Graduate Schools (Paris, Lyon, Lille, Nantes, Marseille) and a member of the TIME (Top Industrial Managers for Europe) network.

Since its founding, Centrale Méditerranée continually trains highly skilled and versatile engineers (called "ingénieurs centraliens"). Candidates are recruited since 2004 through a nationwide highly selective entry exam administered jointly with the other Centrale Graduate Schools.

== Academic profile ==
Centrale Méditerranée is a multidisciplinary school, where the great majority of the students have endured two or three years of intensive maths and physics training (known as prepa) in order to train for the Concours Centrale-Supélec (known as one of the hardest competitive exams in France).

As future general engineers, students do not have any particular major before the last year (Master's level), during which they have to choose among a few electives:

- Mechanical engineering
- Chemical engineering
- Physics, optics and electrical engineering
- Business Administration and Finance
- Mathematics and computer science

The students can also complete their last year in one of the other Centrale Graduate Schools or be part of an exchange program.

There are three-years PhD programs available in all the aforementioned domains of research (the students are required to have completed a Master's program).

=== Exchange programs ===
Being a part of the TIME (Top Industrial Managers for Europe) network, the school has exchange program with many universities across the world, among them :

- Technical University of Munich, Technische Universität Darmstadt, Karlsruhe Institute of Technology (Germany)
- University of Queensland (Australia)
- Cranfield University (UK)
- University of Amsterdam (Netherlands)
- Charles University (Czechia)
- Royal Institute of Technology (Sweden)
- La Sapienza, Politecnico di Milano, University of Bologna (Italy)
- Penn State (US)
- University of São Paulo (Brazil)
- McGill University (Canada)
- Keio University (Japan)
- Beihang University, Tsinghua University (China)
- University of Chile (Chile)

=== Research ===
Eight research laboratories are under the joint leadership of Ecole Centrale Marseille and Aix-Marseille University :

- Laboratory for Mechanics and Acoustics (Laboratoire de Mécanique et d'Acoustique)
- Fresnel Institute (Optics, Photonics and Signal Processing)
- Institute of Research on Non Equilibrium Phenomena (Institut de Recherche sur les Phénomènes Hors Équilibre)
- Institute of Molecular Sciences of Marseille (Institut des sciences moléculaires de Marseille)
- Mechanics, Modelling and Clean Processes (Mécanique Modélisation et Procédés Propres)
- Research Group in Quantitative Economics of Aix-Marseille (Groupe de Recherche en Économie Quantitative)
- Laboratory of Analysis, Topology, and Probability (Laboratoire d’Analyse, Topologie, Probabilités)
- Laboratory of Fundamental Computer Science (Laboratoire d’Informatique Fondamentale)

=== Rankings ===
Centrale Méditerranée is ranked among the top 20 French Grandes Ecoles (graduate schools), though it does not appear in international rankings due to its very limited number of students (250 students for the class of 2016).

== Alumni ==
The alumni network has about 16,000 members worldwide.

=== Notable alumni ===
- Malika Haimeur (1956–), awarded the Irène Joliot-Curie Prize for Women & Business in 2009
