= Nicholas Kurti =

Hungarian physicist (1908–1998)

Nicholas Kurti CBE FRS
- Kürti Miklós
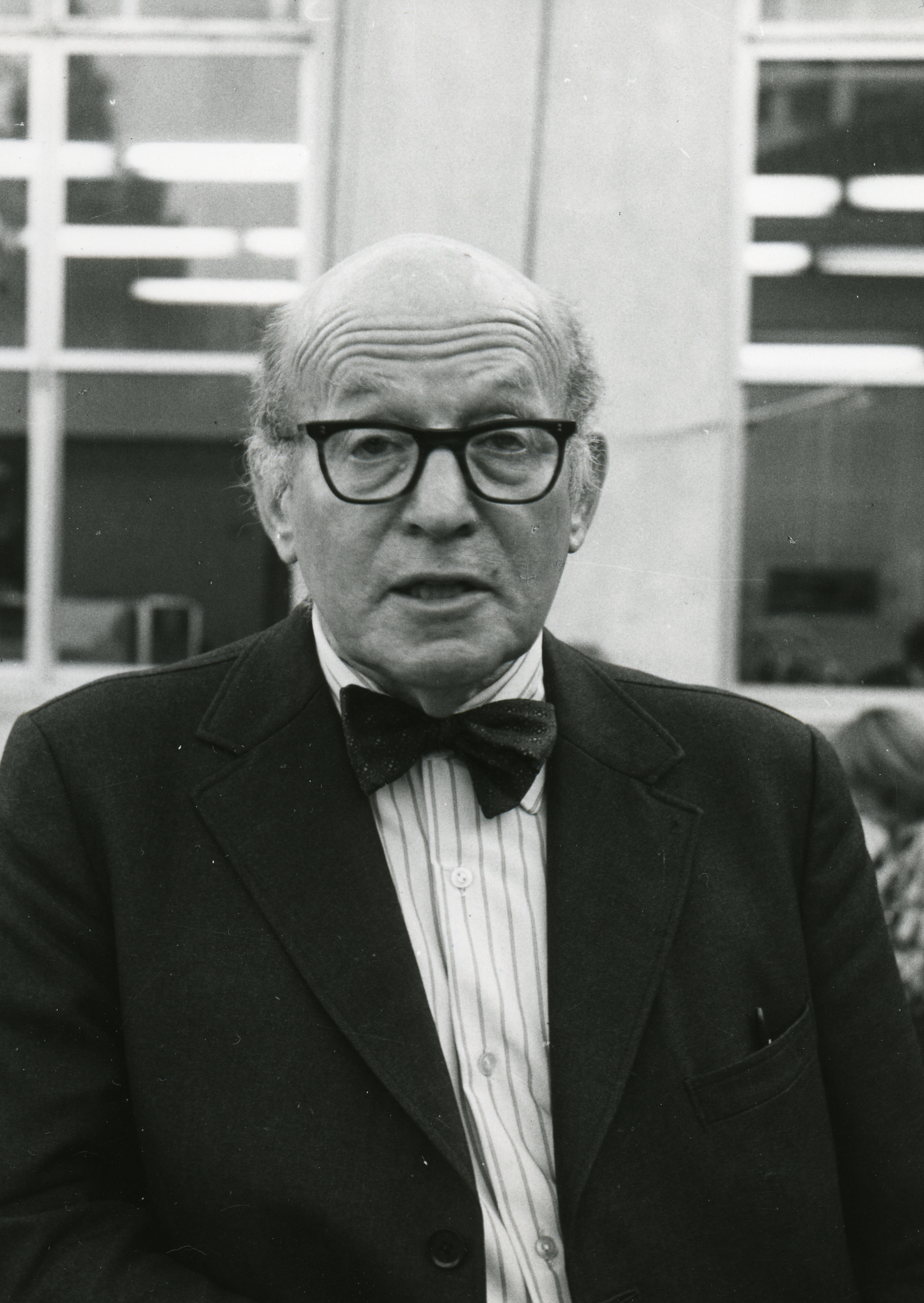
- Born: Kürti Miklós; 14 May 1908; Budapest, Hungary
- Died: 24 November 1998 (aged 90); England
- Education: Minta Gymnasium
- Alma mater: Sorbonne, University of Berlin
- Occupation: Physicist
- Known for: Low-temperature physics
- Awards: Fellow of the Royal Society (1956); Commander of the British Empire (1973)
- Scientific career
- Fields: Physics
- Institutions: Brasenose College (University of Oxford)
- Doctoral advisor: Franz Simon

Nicholas Kurti, CBE FRS (Hungarian: Kürti Miklós) (14 May 1908 – 24 November 1998) was a Hungarian-born British physicist who lived in Oxford, UK, for most of his life.

== Career ==
Born in Budapest, Kurti went to high school at the Minta Gymnasium, but due to anti-Jewish laws he had to leave the country, gaining his master's degree at the Sorbonne in Paris. He obtained his doctorate in low-temperature physics in Berlin, working with Professor Franz Simon. Kurti and Simon continued to work together during 1931–1933 at the Technische Hochschule in Breslau. However, when Adolf Hitler rose to power, both Simon and Kurti left Germany, joining the Clarendon Laboratory in the University of Oxford, England.

During World War II, Kurti worked on the Manhattan Project, returning to Oxford in 1945. In 1955 he won the Fernand Holweck Medal and Prize. In 1956, Simon and Kurti built a laboratory experiment that reached a temperature of one microkelvin. This work attracted worldwide attention, and Kurti was elected a Fellow of the Royal Society. He later became the society's Vice-President from 1965 to 1967.

Kurti became a Fellow of Brasenose College, Oxford, in 1947 and became Professor of Physics at Oxford in 1967, a post he held until his retirement in 1975. He was also Visiting Professor at City College in New York City, the University of California, Berkeley, and Amherst College in Massachusetts.

Nicholas Kurti was elected as a Fellow of the Royal Society (FRS) in 1956, becoming vice-president in 1965, and was appointed as a Commander of the British Empire (CBE) in 1973.

== Personal life ==
In 1946 Kurti married Giana (née Shipley, 1913–2017). They had two daughters, Susannah and Camilla (1952–2018).

I think it is a sad reflection on our civilization that while we can and do measure the temperature in the atmosphere of Venus we do not know what goes on within our souffles.

— Kurti

Kurti's hobby was cooking, and he was an enthusiastic advocate of applying scientific knowledge to culinary problems, a field known today as gastrophysics. In 1969 he gave a talk at the Royal Institution titled "The physicist in the kitchen", in which he amazed the audience by using the recently invented microwave oven to make a "reverse Baked Alaska" — a Frozen Florida — hot liquor enclosed by a shell of frozen meringue. Over the years he organized several international workshops in Erice, Italy on "Molecular and Physical Gastronomy."

== Bibliography ==
- But the Crackling is Superb: An Anthology on Food and Drink by Fellows and Foreign Members of The Royal Society of London ISBN 0-7503-0488-X
