= René Turlay =

French nuclear physicist

- Known for: Nuclear physics
- Awards: Holweck Medal; Chevalier de la Légion d’Honneur
- Scientific career
- Fields: Physics

René Turlay (1932–2002) was a French nuclear physicist.

== Biography ==
René Turlay was one of the four discoverers of charge-parity violation.

In 1957, he joined the CEA laboratory. His first work with the Saturne synchrotron concerned the study of pi meson production in nucleon-nucleon collisions at 2.3 GeV. After his doctoral thesis, he went to Princeton as a post-doc.

From 1962 to 1964, René Turlay played a major role in all phases of the memorable experiment at Brookhaven's accelerator where the CP violation phenomenon in weak interactions was discovered. This work won the 1980 Nobel Prize.

From the 1970s and until after he retired, Turlay worked regurlary at the European Organization for Nuclear Research (CERN) in Geneva on a number of different projects.
