= Sophie Brasselet =

French microscopist

- Education: Paris-Sud University (PhD)
- Awards: CNRS Silver Medal
- Scientific career
- Workplaces: Fresnel Institute
- Thesis: Multipolar processes in nonlinear optics in molecular media (1997)
- Doctoral advisor: Joseph Zyss
- Website: www.fresnel.fr/perso/brasselet

Sophie Brasselet is a French optical physicist whose research interests include nonlinear optics, the optical and fluorescent properties of biomolecules, the optical manipulation of molecules, and the development of instrumentation for biological imaging, over scales ranging from single molecules to multi-cellular tissues. She is a director of research for the French National Centre for Scientific Research (CNRS), and the director of the Fresnel Institute in Marseille (France) also affiliated with the Mosaic advanced photonics group within the institute.

== Education and career ==
Brasselet studied optics and photonics as a student at the École supérieure d'optique, completing her studies in 1994. She went on to a doctorate in 1997 at Paris-Sud University, under the supervision of Joseph Zyss.

After postdoctoral research at Stanford University in California with William E. Moerner, she returned to France in 2000 as an assistant professor at the École normale supérieure de Cachan. In 2006, she moved to Aix-Marseille University and in 2009 she was named a director of research within the CNRS.

== Recognition ==
Brasselet received the CNRS Silver Medal in 2016. In 2022 she won the Léon Brillouin grand prize of the French Optical Society (La Société Française d'Optique), the first female winner of this prize.

She was named a Fellow of Optica, in the 2022 class of fellows, "for advancing fundamental knowledge of molecular nonlinear optics and application to polarization-resolved nonlinear and super resolution orientation microscopy".
