= Minta Gymnasium =

School in Budapest, Hungary

Coordinates: 47°29′38″N 19°03′52″E

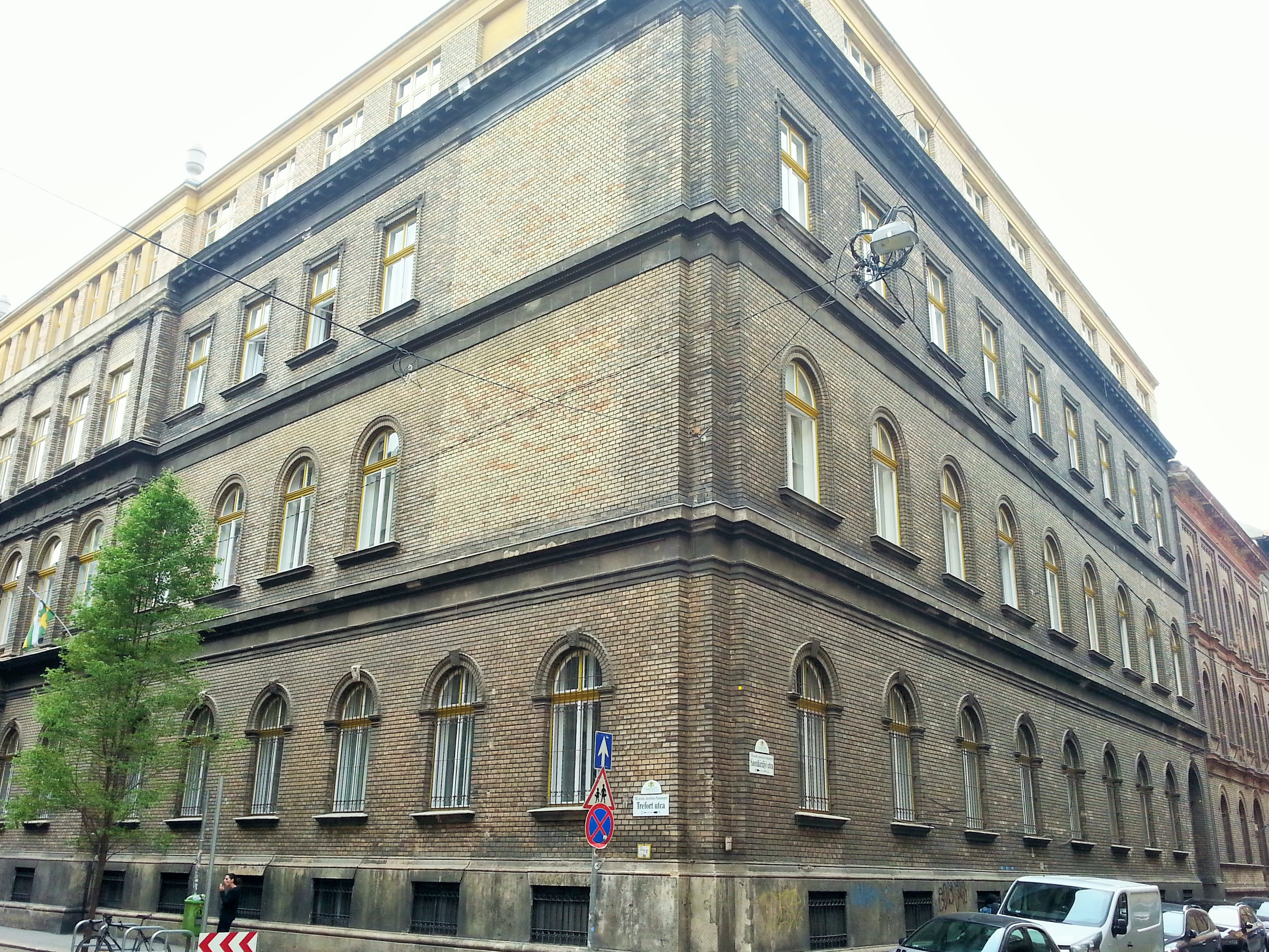
School building in 2022

Minta Gymnasium ("Model") was a secondary school in Budapest, Hungary, founded by Mór Kármán, Hungarian philosopher and educator who reformed the Hungarian school system. It is noted, together with Fasori Lutheran Gymnasium and the Piarist Gymnasium, for a number of talented students.

== History ==
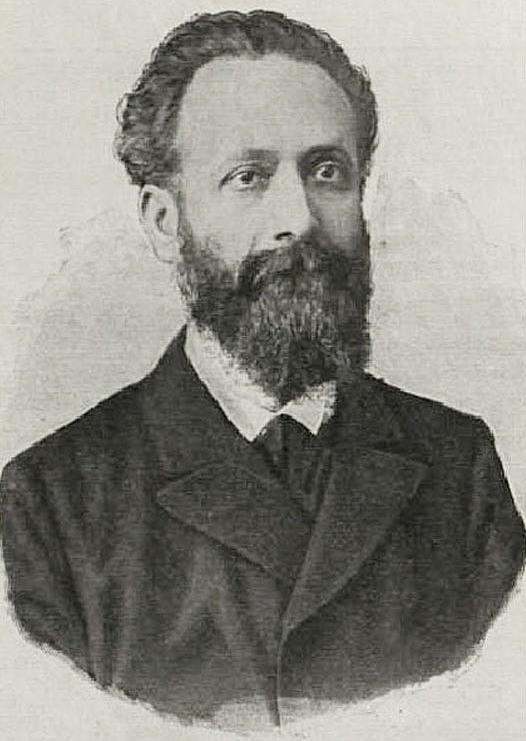
Mór Kármán, founder of the school

Minta Gymnasium was founded by Mór Kármán in 1872 on the German model. It was a state-owned school for boys with a focus on training school teachers. "Minta" ("model") was not an official name, it was so called because "to gain qualification as a teacher, the student was expected to learn how to teach not only what to teach." Students of Minta practiced teaching, and teachers of the school worked with university students in parallel. The gymnasium got its own building in 1887. Mór Kármán was a director until 1896.

Theodore von Kármán, mathematician, aerospace engineer, and one of the sons of Minta's founder Mór Karman, later wrote about his school years (1891-1899):

teaching everything by showing its connection with everyday living. In our beginning Latin class, for instance, I remember that we did not start with rules of grammar. Instead we were told to walk around the city and copy the inscriptions on statutes, churches, and museums. ... When we had collected the phrases and brought them to class. The teacher asked us which words we already knew. We usually could recognize a few words among the phrases. If we didn't, we looked them up. Then he asked us if we recognized the same word in different forms. Why were the forms different? Because they showed different relationships to other words in the inscription. We continued in this way until we understood each phrase and why it was placed on the monument.

Mathematics, which I studied eagerly, was taught in terms of everyday statics. ... For instance we looked up the figures of production of wheat in Hungary for several years. We set up tables and then drew graphs, so we could observe the changes and locate the maximum and minimum of wheat production. In the diagrams we searched for correlations and we learned about "the rate of change", which brought us to the edge of the calculus. We thus learned in a practical way that there was a relationship between quantities that varied, and, as with Latin, we learned at the same time something of the changing social and economic forces of the country.

von Karman also wrote in his autobiography that "Instead of memorizing from books students had to look up figures, set up diagrams, search for correlations between changing quantities or from Latin vocabulary gathered from every day life to deduce some basic rules for inflection and conjugation of Latin nouns and verbs".

Physicist Edward Teller, also a graduate of Minta, had different memories (1917-1925):

school was not academically stimulating. Students were required to participate but there was little enthusiasm for learning. The teachers were unenthusiastic; most classrooms were in semi-revolt. There was no real interest or exchange of ideas.

Among the subjects were Hungarian and German language and literature, Latin and Greek, religion and ethics, philosophy, geography, natural history, representative geometry, mathematics, and physics, art and gym.

Mathematician Geza Schay "viewed that school as the first one where a student did not simply learn subject matter, but learned to think."

The gymnasium still exists, but is now called Trefort Ágoston Practicing Gimnázium of Eötvös Loránd University, its address being 8 Trefort Street, District VIII.

== Famous students ==
- Theodore von Kármán, mathematician, aerospace engineer, attended Minta in 1891-1899
- Thomas Balogh and Nicholas Kaldor, economists, graduated in the 1920s
- Alfréd Rényi, mathematician
- Peter Lax, mathematician
- Michael Polanyi, physical chemist, graduated in 1908
- Karl Polanyi, historian
- Geza Schay, mathematician, attended Minta in 1913-1918
- Nicholas Kurti, low temperature physicist
- Edward Teller, theoretical physicist, attended gymnasium in 1917-1925
- Thomas Szasz, psychiatrist
