= List of Ecuadorian ironmen =

This is a list of Ecuadorian Ironman who have participated and finished the full Ironman distance competitions around the world.

Roman Bravo has the best finished time of all the Ecuadorian participants in the Ironman Triathlon. His finished time at the Cozumel Ironman in 2021 was 8:29:05. Nelson Vásquez was the first Ecuadorian to become an Ironman in Switzerland in 1999, with an official time of 11:42:57.

== Men's Division ==
Ranking	Name	Time	Event	Year					
1	Roman Bravo	8:29:05	Ironman Cozumel	2021					
2	Jose Maria Ponce	9:05:04	Ironman Arizona	2019					
3	Fabricio Avila	9:14:27	Ironman Maryland	2019					
4	Patricio Vergara	9:16:06	Ironman Florida	2009					
5	Diego Vasquez	9:25:01	Ironman Mar del Plata	2017					
6	Santiago Gutierrez	9:27:02	Ironman Florida	2009					
7	Silvio Guerra	9:34:15	Ironman Cozumel	2021					
8	Diego Sosa	9:36:26	Ironman Texas	2016					
9	Carlos Horacio Poggi	9:38:15	Ironman Florida	2021					
10	Pedro Núques	9:41:36	Ironman Florida	2007					
11	Charlie Sánchez	9:42:27	Ironman Austria	2009					
12	Juan José Jaramillo J.	9:46:20	Ironman Cozumel	2023					
13	Giovanny Mármol	9:48:08	Ironman Coeur D'Alene	2009					
14	Guillermo Del Castillo	9:54:05	Ironman Florida	2023					
15	Jaime Pavon	10:00:15	Ironman Maryland	2021					
16	Oswaldo Raul Estrada Pastor	10:03:28	Ironman Cozumel	2023					
17	Fausto Bolaños A	10:07:12	Ironman Cozumel	2019					
18	Vicente Mendoza	10:08:58	Ironman Mar del Plata	2017					
19	Francisco Vélez A	10:09:31	Ironman Cozumel	2017					
20	Oscar Benitez	10:11:37	Ironman Cozumel	2019					
21	Hernán Illingworth	10:20:29	Ironman Cozumel	2017					
22	Josué Borja Mancheno	10:21:46	Ironman Cozumel	2022					
23	Gustavo Darquea	10:27:13	Ironman Barcelona	2019					
24	Daniel Houser	10:30:20	Ironman Cozumel	2021	25	Juanfer Rodríguez	10:31:27	Ironman Florida	2022
26	Cesar Augusto Canizares	10:32:39	Ironman Florida	2019					
27	Hernán Eguez	10:35:57	Ironman Florida	2009					
28	Pedro Costales	10:36:28	Ironman Florida	2016					
29	Pablo Vallejo Vega	10:36:39	Ironman Florida	2016					
30	Eddy Arana	10:44:18	Ironman Cozumel	2019					
31	Guillermo Zambrano	10:48:57	Ironman Florianópolis	2018					
32	Raúl Manotoa	10:48:58	Ironman Cozumel	2013					
33	Edgar Samaniego	10:49:13	Ironman Wisconsin	2007					
34	Pablo Izurieta	10:52:10	Ironman Maryland	2023					
35	Edward Pudlla	10:52:54	Ironman Regensburg	2012					
36	Erik Granda	10:55:26	Ironman Cozumel	2021					
37	Diego Escudero	10:56:55	Ironman Brazil	2008					
38	Luis Alberto Baquerizo	10:59:29	Ironman Florida	2006					
39	Juan Fernando Rodríguez	11:02:42	Ironman Santa Rosa	2019					
40	David Argudo	11:04:15	Ironman Florida	2013					
41	Byron Flores	11:09:11	Ironman Florida	2016					
42	Mauricio Rodríguez	11:13:32	Ironman Florida	2009					
43	Juan José Canessa	11:16:01	Ironman Florida	2005					
44	Antonio Andretta	11:16:26	Ironman Florida	2007					
45	Fernando Moncayo	11:16:34	Ironman Florida	2009					
46	Aldo Borges	11:18:16	Ironman Florida	2005					
47	Javier Guerrero	11:17:03	Ironman Florida	2016					
48	Santiago Camala	11:19:27	Ironman Cozumel	2013					
49	Pablo Campana	11:20:03	Ironman Florida	2003					
50	Francisco Flores	11:24:17	Ironman Cozumel	2013					
51	Edwin Ortega	11:26:23	Ironman Cozumel	2013					
52	Byron Romero	11:28:27	Ironman Cozumel	2023					
53	Washington Lam	11:29:23	Ironman Florida	2007					
54	Christian Moyano	11:31:38	Ironman Florida	2016					
55	Wilson Palacios	11:31:47	Ironman Florida	2009					
56	Rafael Verduga	11:31:55	Ironman Florida	2016					
57	Andrés Villagrán	11:32:46	Ironman Naples	2015					
58	Patricio Montalvo	11:33:34	Ironman Cozumel	2013					
59	Hugo Lino Gonzalez	11:37:42	Ironman Cozumel	2019					
60	Juan Carlos Canizares	11:35:43	Ironman Florida	2022 .......					
61	Luis Miguel Pinos	11:38:56	Ironman Cozumel	2013					
62	Daniel Moncayo	11:39:17	Ironman Cozumel	2013					
63	Juan Carlos Ibarra	11:40:29	Ironman Brazil	2008					
64	Carlos Arcentales	11:41:05	Ironman Cozumel	2021					
65	Edward Briones	11:41:45	Ironman Cozumel	2021					
66	Carlos Coello	11:42:52	Ironman Florida	2016					
67	Nelson Vásquez	11:42:57	Ironman Switzerland	1999					
68	Mario Silva	11:43:51	Ironman Florida	2009					
69	Giovanni Lopez	11:44:21	Ironman Florida	2016					
70	Carlos Garzón	11:45:12	Ironman Francia	2009					
71	Mauricio Rojas	11:46:16	Ironman Florida	2007					
72	Carlos Cristiansen	11:46:26	Ironman Florida	2016					
73	Fernando Merino	11:46:29	Ironman Florida	2006					
74	Jaime Gonzalez	11:53:58	Ironman Cozumel	2021					
75	Gino Giuseppe Poggi	11:56:44	Ironman Arizona	2017					
76	Yober Aguirre	11:57:45	Ironman Cozumel	2018					
77	Rodmy Flores	11:58:04	Ironman Florida	2017					
78	Eduardo Maruri	11:58:57	Ironman Florida	2002					
79	Manuel Fajardo	11:59:20	Ironman Florida	2007					
80	Jose Luis Beltrán	12:03:19	Ironman Cozumel	2012					
81	Jorge Villavicencio	12:04:14	Ironman Canada	2007					
82	Christian Cedeño	12:05:54	Ironman Florida	2016					
83	Freddy Luna	12:07:25	Ironman Florida	2009					
84	Mario Sánchez	12:10:24	Ironman Cozumel	2013					
85	Esteban Herdoiza	12:10:40	Ironman Texas	2018					
86	Carlos Gonzalez	12:11:02	Ironman Florida	2009					
87	Ivan Grain	12:14:11	Ironman Florida	2016					
88	Andrés Casal	12:14:13	Ironman Florida	2008					
89	Pedro Vélez	12:14:13	Ironman Florida	2008					
90	Antonio Noboa	12:14:38	Ironman Australia	2004					
91	Oscar Yagual	12:14:56	Ironman Cozumel	2021					
92	Esteban Amador	12:16:08	Ironman Florida	2004					
93	Jorge Roca	12:16:10	Ironman Florida	2002					
94	Jaime Ortiz	12:17:02	Ironman Italy	2019					
95	Vinicio Alvarado	12:18:32	Ironman Regensburg	2012					
96	Ricardo Palau	12:21:31	Ironman Hawaii	2002					
97	Ramón Aráuz	12:21:42	Ironman Florida	2005					
98	Mijail Constante	12:22:33	Ironman Wisconsin	2021					
99	Roberto Tumbaco	12:23:33	Ironman Florida	2016					
100	Pier Péndola	12:25:44	Ironman Brazil	2008					
101	Diego Simaluisa	12:26:30	Ironman Cozumel	2012					
102	Pablo De La Vega	12:26:03	Ironman Cozumel	2023					
103	Mauricio Soto	12:27:09	Ironman Arizona	2018					
104	Christian Jaramillo	12:30:38	Ironman Florida	2009					
105	Luis Sud	12:31:07	Ironman Cozumel	2022					
106	Alex Firas	12:31:31	Ironman Barcelona	2019					
107	Diego Lavalle	12:32:50	Ironman Florida	2005					
108	Juan Carlos Barrionuevo	12:38:49	Ironman Brazil	2008					
109	Henrry Del Valle	12:39:25	Ironman Brazil	2008					
110	Cristóforo Roditti	12:41:26	Ironman Florida	2005					
111	Richard Mayaguare	12:46:45	Ironman Cozumel	2018					
112	Mauricio Vera	12:46:58	Ironman Florida	2009					
113	Manuel Adum	12:47:26	Ironman Florida	2001					
114	Christian Flores	12:49:18	Ironman Cozumel	2013					
115	Francisco Carpio	12:49:33	Ironman Cozumel	2013					
116	Juan Carlos Silva	12:49:56	Ironman Florida	2009					
117	Gino Navarrete	12:50:21	Ironman Wisconsin	2013					
118	Jorge Lasso	12:51:49	Ironman Florida	2016					
119	Reynaldo Cedeño	12:54:14	Ironman Cozumel	2018					
120	Gustavo Murillo	12:54:28	Ironman Cozumel	2014					
121	Xavier Manrique	12:56:31	Ironman Florida	2005					
122	Raul Arboleda Andrade	12:59:16	Ironman Cozumel	2021					
123	Francisco Almeida	13:00:56	Ironman Cozumel	2014					
124	Alberto Navarro Mata	13:02:28	Ironman Florida	2011					
125	Rubi Torres Reyes	13:03:40	Ironman Florida	2010					
126	José Plúas	13:04:39	Ironman Kentucky	2009					
127	Andrés Pinto	13:08:22	Ironman Cozumel	2014					
128	Jorge Luis Rojas	13:08:25	Ironman Florida	2009					
129	José Sandoval	13:14:20	Ironman Cozumel	2013					
130	Dario Vallejo	13:14:45	Ironman Cozumel	2018					
131	Juan José Pons	13:15:13	Ironman Arizona	2006					
132	Esteban Herdoiza	13:16:07	Ironman Arizona	2015					
133	César Pérez	13:16:48	Ironman Florida	2009					
134	Juan Carlos Gandara	13:16:51	Ironman Maryland	2024					
135	Gonzalo Díaz Palacios	13:17:23	Ironman Florida	2007					
136	Edgar Lima	13:18:10	Ironman Cozumel	2013					
137	José Prieto	13:21:56	Ironman Brazil	2008					
138	John Barbery Taranto	13:23:09	Ironman Cozumel	2023					
139	Jean Pierre Rodriguez	13:26:57	Ironman Florida	2019					
140	Carlos Paúl Pérez	13:29:24	Ironman Cozumel	2020					
141	Blasco Peñaherrera	13:30:10	Ironman Switzerland	2003					
142	Carlos "Charlie" Rosero	13:30:55	Ironman Cozumel	2022					
143	Jorge Páez Abad	13:35:14	Ironman Texas	2022					
144	Mario Pescarolo	13:35:20	Ironman Maryland	2019					
145	Andrés Martínez Nicolalde	13:38:12	Ironman Cozumel	2020					
146	Christian Albuja Terán	13:38:58	Ironman Cozumel	2014					
147	Andrés Zurita	13:40:59	Ironman Cozumel	2014					
148	Jorge Luis Fuentes	13:40:43	Ironman Arizona	2021					
149	Christian Loaiza	13:41:22	Ironman Florida	2010					
150	Daniel Redín Valdivieso	13:46:09	Ironman Louisville	2014					
151	Mauricio Villamar	13:49:48	Ironman Cozumel	2013					
152	Geovanny Delgado	13:52:14	Ironman Arizona	2018					
153	Rodolfo Chipe	13:56:30	Ironman Florida	2016					
154	José Paul Hinojosa	13:56:41	Ironman Cozumel	2022					
155	José Barzallo	13:57:42	Ironman Cozumel	2012					
156	Juan Carlos Izquierdo	13:59:21	Ironman Maryland	2024					
157	José F. Garcés	13:59:47	Ironman Cozumel	2014					
158	Carlos Fernando Villota Pérez	13:59:52	Ironman Cozumel	2020					
159	Hugo Unda Triviño	13:59:53	Ironman Florida	2007					
160	Juan Diego Castanier	14:00:10	Ironman Vicky/France	2018					
161	Wilson Patricio Siza	14:01:44	Ironman Cozumel	2018					
162	Raul J. Coral	14:02:47	Ironman Florida	2010					
163	Christian Batson	14:05:29	Ironman Cozumel	2014					
164	Dennis Cordova	14:06:26	Ironman Florida	2016					
165	Diego Terán	14:07:40	Ironman Arizona	2011					
166	Juan Campuzano	14:17:49	Ironman Cozumel	2014					
167	Edmundo Pontón	14:19:18	Ironman Cozumel	2013					
168	Francisco Rivas	14:23:01	Ironman Florida	2016					
169	Francisco Barriga	14:24:24	Ironman Florida	2008					
170	Renato Agama	14:25:24	Ironman Cozumel	2013					
171	Ricardo Umpierrez	14:35:18	Ironman Cozumel	2012					
172	José Murillo	14:36:08	Ironman Brazil	2008					
173	Carlos Alvarado	14:39:00	Ironman Austria	2015					
174	Fabián Vilema	14:52:10	Ironman Cozumel	2022					
175	Juan Carlos Estrada	15:04:27	Ironman Austria	2015					
176	Marco Lara	15:04:20	Ironman Cozumel	2018					
177	Gustavo Hernandez	15:20:24	Ironman Barcelona	2019					
178	Esteban Tapia	15:33:59	Ironman Cozumel	2013					
179	Victor Hugo Rodriguez	15:34:46	Ironman Florida	2016					
180	Jose Villagomez	15:44:31	Ironman Florida	2024					
181	Mauricio Jácome	16:05:02	Ironman Florida	2016					
182	Leonidas Ortega	16:29:57	Ironman Brazil	2006					
183	Marcos Andrade	16:35:31	Ironman Cozumel	2018					
184	Carlos Cruz	16:37:22	Ironman Florida	2016					
185	Luis Guamán	16:40:26	Ironman Cozumel	2018					

== Women's Division ==
Ranking	Name	Time	Event	
1	Carolina Ponce	10:08:27	Ironman Arizona	2015
2	Marialuz Arellano	10:12:21	Ironman Cozumel	2021
3	Gabriela Coloma	10:19:19	Ironman Florida	2026
4	Paola Gamboa	10:37:13	Ironman Wisconsin	2019
5	Karen Pita	10:56:08	Ironman Arizona	2023
6	Andrea Yanez Pazmiño	11:02:16	Ironman Cozumel	2022
7	Maria Fernanda Santillan	11:11:34	Ironman Florida	2017
8	María Fernanda Poveda Franco	11:32:00	Ironman Busselton	2018
9	Flor Maria Mendoza	11:43:19	Ironman Florida	2017
10	María Teresa Guerrero	11:44:34	Ironman Cozumel	2022
11	María Fernanda Poveda Franco	11:45:00	Ironman Cairns	2019
12	Catalina Andrade	11:49:27	Ironman Florida	2016
13	Gabriela Basantes	11:51:41	Ironman Francia	2008
14	Lorena Schwarz	11:53:42	Ironman Florida	2006
15	Soledad Coello	12:01:19	Ironman Florida	2009
16	Belen Morejon	12:02:13	Ironman Florida	2016
17	Anita Jaya	12:12:05	Ironman Cozumel	2022
18	Kerlly Vega	12:21:49	Ironman Florida	2016
19	Paola Estrada	12:33:19	Ironman Wisconsin	2007
20	Erika Segale	12:37:57	Ironman Florida	2016
21	Lorena Molina	13:03:16	Ironman Florida	2009
22	Manuela Mantilla	13:44:15	Ironman Clermont	2004
23	Dallyana Passailaigue	13:53:12	Ironman Austria	2004
24	María Paula Mayorga	13:55:07	Ironman Cozumel	2013
25	Lucía Tapia	14:05:02	Ironman Cozumel	2022
26	Ruth Vega	14:27:05	Ironman Cozumel	2011
27	Diana Berenice Arteta Rodriguez	14:28:19	Ironman Zurich	2017
28	Mary Ledesma	14:44:47	Ironman Florida	2010
29	María Elizabeth Suárez-Aviles Intriago	15:16:49	Ironman Cozumel	2020
30	Arianne Drouet	16:13:11	Ironman Lake Placid	2025
31	Gina Paola Navarrete	16:41:10	Ironman Cozumel	2018
