= Spinor condensate =

Type of exotic matter

Spinor condensates are degenerate Bose gases that have degrees of freedom arising from the internal spin of the constituent particles. They are described by a multi-component (spinor) order parameter. Since their initial experimental realisation, a wealth of studies have appeared, both experimental and theoretical, focusing on the physical properties of spinor condensates, including their ground states, non-equilibrium dynamics, and vortices.

== Early work ==
The study of spinor condensates was initiated in 1998 by experimental groups at JILA and MIT. These experiments utilised ^{23}Na and ^{87}Rb atoms, respectively. In contrast to most prior experiments on ultracold gases, these experiments utilised a purely optical trap, which is spin-insensitive. Shortly thereafter, theoretical work appeared which described the possible mean-field phases of spin-one spinor condensates.

== Underlying Hamiltonian ==
The Hamiltonian describing a spinor condensate is most frequently written using the language of second quantization. Here the field operator $\hat{\psi}_m^\dagger({\bf r})$ creates a boson in Zeeman level $m$ at position ${\bf r}$. These operators satisfy bosonic commutation relations:

$[\hat{\psi}_m({\bf r}), \hat{\psi}_{m'}^\dagger({\bf r}')] = \delta({\bf r} - {\bf r}') \delta_{mm'}.$

The free (non-interacting) part of the Hamiltonian is

$H_0 = \sum_m \int d^3 r \hat{\psi}_{m}^\dagger({\bf r}) \left( -\frac{\hbar^2}{2m} \nabla^2 + V_{\rm ext}({\bf r}) \right) \hat{\psi}_{m}^\dagger({\bf r}).$

where $m$ denotes the mass of the constituent particles and $V_{\rm ext}({\bf r})$ is an external potential. For a spin-one spinor condensate, the interaction Hamiltonian is

$H_{\rm int} = \frac{1}{2} \int d^3 r : \left( c_0 \hat{\rho}({\bf r})^2 + c_1 (\hat{{\bf F}}({\bf r}))^2 \right):.$

In this expression, $\hat{\rho}({\bf r}) = \sum_m \hat{\psi}_m^\dagger({\bf r}) \hat{\psi}_m ({\bf r})$ is the operator corresponding to the density, $\hat{{\bf F}}({\bf r}) = \sum_{mm'} \hat{\psi}_m^\dagger({\bf r}) {\bf S}_{mm'} \hat{\psi}_{m'}({\bf r})$ is the local spin operator (${\bf S}_{mm'}$ is a vector composed of the spin-one matrices), and :: denotes normal ordering. The parameters $c_0, c_1$ can be expressed in terms of the s-wave scattering lengths of the constituent particles. Higher spin versions of the interaction Hamiltonian are slightly more involved, but can generally be expressed by using Clebsch–Gordan coefficients.

The full Hamiltonian then is $H = H_0 + H_{\rm int}$.

== Mean-field phases ==
In Gross-Pitaevskii mean field theory, one replaces the field operators with c-number functions: $\hat{\psi}_{m}({\bf r}) \rightarrow {\psi}_{m}({\bf r})$. To find the mean-field ground states, one then minimises the resulting energy with respect to these c-number functions. For a spatially uniform system spin-one system, there are two possible mean-field ground states. When $c_1 > 0$, the ground state is $\psi_{\rm polar} = \sqrt{\bar{\rho}}(0,1,0)$ while for $c_1< 0$ the ground state is $\psi_{\rm ferro} = \sqrt{\bar{\rho}}(1,0,0).$ The former expression is referred to as the polar state while the latter is the ferromagnetic state. Both states are unique up to overall spin rotations. Importantly, $\psi_{\rm ferro}$ cannot be rotated into $\psi_{\rm polar}$. The Majorana stellar representation provides a particularly insightful description of the mean-field phases of spinor condensates with larger spin.

== Vortices ==
Due to being described by a multi-component order parameter, numerous types of topological defects (vortices) can appear in spinor condensates. Homotopy theory provides a natural description of topological defects, and is regularly employed to understand vortices in spinor condensates.
