= Gastrophysics =

Fundamental understanding of gastronomy & cooking

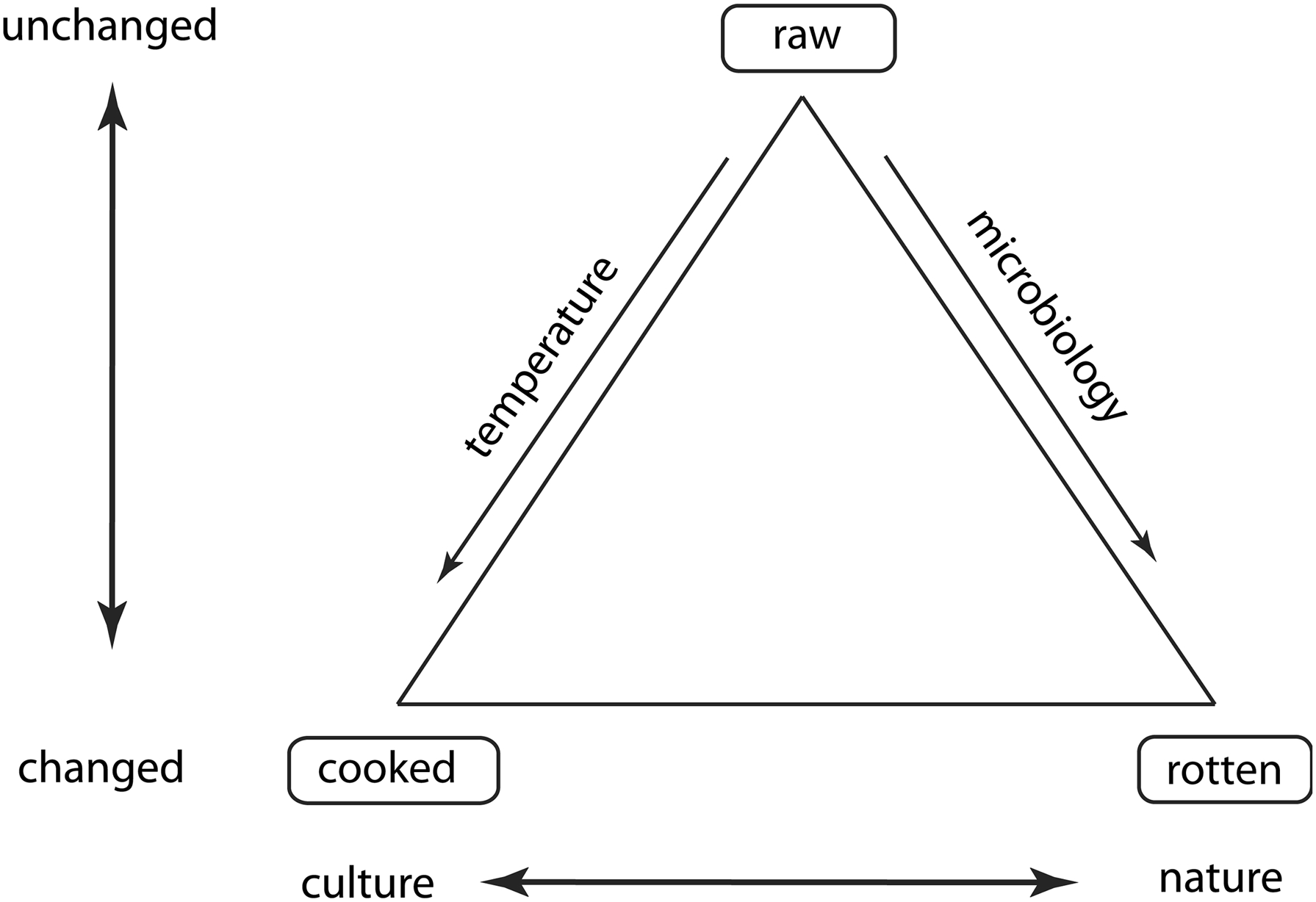
The culinary triangle proposed by Lévy-Strauss. The transition from raw to cooked is temperature-driven, from raw to rotten by microorganisms.

Gastrophysics (gastronomical physics) is an emerging interdisciplinary science that employs principles from physics and chemistry to attain a fundamental understanding of the worlds of gastronomy and cooking. Gastrophysical topics of interest include investigations of the raw materials of food, the effects of food preparation, and quantitative aspects of the physical basis for food quality, flavour, appreciation and absorption in the human body.

== Definition and aim ==
Gastrophysics is a scientific discipline that focuses on investigations of aspects of gastronomy and cooking that relates to phenomena, which can be described and explained in a frame of physics, physical chemistry, chemistry, and associated sciences.

The inspiration for gastrophysics is gastronomy and cooking. Gastrophysical studies has a gastronomic observation as its starting point, and aims at unravelling the scientific nature of the observations on many different macroscopic and microscopic scales, including explaining physical and chemical aspects of the raw materials, of their transformations during the preparation of food, as well as of the sensory response while eating.

The chemical and physical composition, as well as properties of raw food materials, are important for the transformations that occur in the food during preparation (heating, cooling, mixing, beating, fermenting, salting, drying, smoking, souring etc.). Flavour (taste and smell), mouthfeel, chemesthesis, astringency are all determinants for the sensory evaluation of food, and these characteristics are also related to the chemical properties and the physical texture of the food, and to how the food is transformed in the mouth. Gastrophysics deals with each of these components and aims at uncovering their mutual relations, i.e. how the sensory input relates to the material composition and properties of food, and the absorption in the human body.

Gastrophysics is a scientifically inspired approach to gastronomy, but it is a science in its own right, and not a discipline to service chefs in creating new dishes. Gastrophysics focuses on gaining fundamental scientific insight to gastronomy and understanding general phenomena, without removing any of the craft, creativity, and art characteristics of cooking.

The relation between gastrophysics and gastronomy can be seen as analogous to the relation between astrophysics and astronomy. Astronomers observe planets and stars, and describe where they are and how they move. Astrophysicists explain why the planets and stars are where they are, and how they got there. In the same way, gastrophysics aims to explain the general scientific nature of gastronomy.

== Methodology ==
Whereas gastrophysics is a relatively new discipline within the physical sciences, the foundation for exploring the kind of soft matter that food is, is already well established in other areas of modern physics. The methodology of gastrophysics greatly overlaps with e.g. (molecular) biophysics, soft matter physics, material physics, physical chemistry, analytical chemistry etc. This holds for experimental, theoretical and phenomenological approaches. Gastrophysics leans on state-of-art technologies both experimentally and computationally.

== History ==
It is unknown when the term gastrophysics was first coined, but it appears to have been independently proposed as a physics approach to gastronomy in the labs of the physicist Nicholas Kurti, Peter Barham, and Ole G. Mouritsen.

In order to conceptualise the term "gastrophysics", the first international symposium on the topic—"The emerging science of gastrophysics"—was held in Copenhagen in 2012, bringing together key actors. One conclusion of the symposium was that gastrophysics could significantly impact gastronomy and tomorrow's food sciences, and how both develop in the 21st century.

In addition to the aforementioned Nicholas Kurti, Peter Barham, and Ole G. Mouritsen, other popular gastrophysicists include Charles Spence, Mathias Porsmose Clausen and Eneko Axpe.
