= Joseph Zyss =

French physicist

- Born: 1950 (age 75–76); Neuilly-sur-Seine, France
- Education: École Normale Supérieure de Cachan (E.N.S., 1965)
- Known for: Molecular photonics
- Awards: Gay-Lussac-Humboldt-Prize (2010); Yves-Rocard Award (1996); ForMemRS (2015).
- Scientific career
- Fields: Physicist
- Institutions: Institut d'Optique; École Polytechnique; Centre national de la recherche scientifique
- Doctoral students: Sophie Brasselet
- Website: www.ens-cachan.fr/lecole/distinctions/joseph-zyss

Joseph Zyss (born in 1950) is a French physicist who specialises in molecular photonics and nonlinear optics. He is the author or co-author of more than 600 articles in the field.

== Career ==
From 1975 to 1997, Zyss worked at the CNET's Bagneux Laboratory. Subsequently he has worked in the Laboratoire de photonique quantique et moléculaire (UMR 8537), and is its former director (1998–2006). In 2002, he was the founder of the Jean-Le-Rond-d'Alembert Institute (IFR 121), and served as its director until 2015. He also founded the European Associated Laboratory (LEA NaBi), a collaboration between CNRS and the Weizmann Institute of Science in the field of nanobiotechnologies. As of 2018, he is an Emeritus professor at the École normale supérieure de Cachan.

== Research ==
His research has focused on molecular photonics. He specialises in molecular-level nonlinear optical effects. These researches have linked basic physical chemistry with technologies and applications including polymers for information technology and biophotonics imaging.

== Awards and honours ==
Zyss is an elected fellow of The Optical Society, and has been awarded the Société Française de Physique's IBM prize and Yves-Rocard Award, as well as the Gay-Lussac-Humboldt-Prize (2010).

== See also ==
- Alain Aspect
- Claude Fabre
