= Maurice Goldman (physicist) =

French physicist

Maurice Goldman (born 1 March 1933) is a French physicist and member of the French Academy of Sciences, who is at the origin of developments in the theory of nuclear magnetic resonance.

== Biography ==
Engineer with a degree from the École supérieure de physique et de chimie industrielles de la ville de Paris (70th class), he joined the Commissariat à l'énergie atomique where he held the position of physicist and then Scientific Director from 1955 to 1993. From 1969 to 1983, he was head of the nuclear magnetism laboratory at the Collège de France. He was a scientific advisor at the CEA from 1993 to 2004. Maurice Goldman is the author of important work in nuclear magnetic resonance, including statistical thermodynamics of spin systems, nuclear relaxation and dynamic polarization, and high-resolution NMR theory in liquids.

== Scientific work ==
Maurice Goldman, after studying isotopic separation and mass spectrometry, joined the Magnetic Resonance Laboratory created by Anatole Abragam at the CEA. Its main work, some of which has led to applications of practical interest, has focused on three main areas.

He first conducted studies related to the theory of spin temperature at high temperature: thermal mixing experiments deepened all aspects of this theory, in particular the concept of spin temperature in the rotating referential, extended to quadrupole interactions, the concept of negative absolute temperature, the extension of the theory of the dynamics of thermal coupling between distinct energy reservoirs, as well as many practical applications of this theory in the form of experimental or theoretical tools.

He then studied the nuclear magnetic order in high magnetic field, under the effect of "truncated" dipole interactions. This vast domain was the ultimate extension of the spin temperature concept and led in particular to the prediction and observation of magnetic structures unknown to conventional electronic systems, such as the rotating transverse helical order. These properties were studied by NMR and neutron diffraction.

Finally, he studied and developed magnetic relaxation under radiofrequency irradiation of molecules in solution, which led to a general method for determining local mobility in large molecules in solution, in particular biomolecules.

In shorter studies, he has also demonstrated different diffusion rates of the same ions at different crystalline sites in single crystals, studied the fractal structure of polymers by magnetic relaxation, developed an illustration of the "Berry phase" in electron resonance, as well as a new formulation of relaxation theory.

== Distinctions ==
- Winner of the Henri de Parville Prize of the Academy of Sciences in 1969
- Winner of the Grand Prix Cognacq-Jay of the French Academy of sciences with Anatole Abragam and Maurice Chapelier in 1970
- Winner of the Holweck Prize of the French Physical Society and the Physical Society in 1977
- Maurice Goldman was elected correspondent of the Academy of Sciences in 1986 and then a member of the Academy of Sciences (physics section) in 2004.
- Maurice Goldman is a Commandeur in the Order of Academic Palms.

== Books ==
- Spin Temperature and Nuclear Magnetic Resonance in Solids, Oxford University Press, 1970
- Nuclear Magnetism: Order and Disorder with Anatole Abragam, Oxford University Press, 1982
- Quantum Description of High-Resolution NMR in Liquids, Oxford University Press, 1988
