= Fresnel Institute =

Research institute in optics and photonics located in Marseille, France

- Institut Fresnel
- Named after: Augustin Fresnel
- Established: 2000; 26 years ago
- Type: UMR 7249
- Location: Marseille, France
- Coordinates: 43.33985°N 5.41206°E
- Fields: Optics, photonics
- Director: Sophie Brasselet
- Affiliations: CNRS, Aix-Marseille University, Centrale Méditerranée
- R.O.R. Id: 03br1wy20
- Website: fresnel.fr

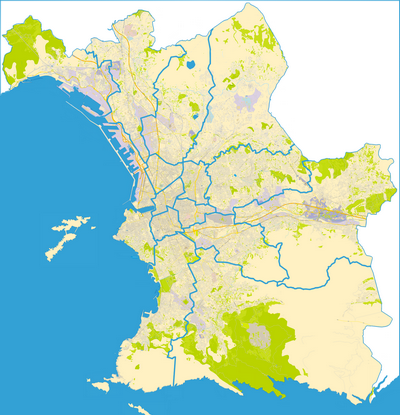
Location of the institute in Marseille's 13th arrondissement

The Fresnel Institute (French: Institut Fresnel) is a research laboratory dedicated to optics and photonics located in Marseille, France. It is a joint research unit (UMR 7249) between the French National Centre for Scientific Research (CNRS), Aix-Marseille Université and Centrale Méditerranée, created on 1 January 2000.

The institute currently brings together about 200 researchers, lecturer-researchers, and doctoral students divided into 14 research teams. Its dominant scientific themes relate to optics and imaging, more specifically in the fields of photonics, electromagnetism, image processing, signal processing, metamaterials, random waves, advanced imaging, biophotonics, biomedical imaging, nanophotonics, plasmonics, optical components, damage, and laser processes. It has an annual budget in of about 13M €.

The institute plays a role in some aspects of the Erasmus Mundus EUROPHOTONICS program, which is coordinated by Aix-Marseille University and shared with partners around the world including Karlsruhe Institute of Technology, the Autonomous University of Barcelona, Tampere University, Vilnius University and others.

== History ==
The Fresnel Institute was born in 1999, and officially recognized as a French unité mixte de recherche (UMR) on 1 January 2000. The first director was Claude Amra.

The institute is named after French scientist Augustin-Jean Fresnel, whose research on the wave theory of light led to its near unanimous acceptance.

Various improvements have been realized to the institute's infrastructure since its founding. This includes for example the inauguration of the Éspace Photonique (Photonic Platform) in 2014–2015.

== Organization ==
The institute comprises 14 research groups. These include:

- Advanced THeory for Electromagnetism and its Numerical Analysis (ATHENA)
- Contrôle de la Lumière et Analyse du Rayonnement : Traitement Électromagnétique (CLARTÉ)
- COherent Microscopy and X-rays (COMiX)
- Diffusion lumineuse, milieu désordonnés, exaltations multi-diélectriques, chaleur et mimétisme (CONCEPT)
- Propagation en milieux aléatoires - Approche multi-échelle (DIMABIO)
- Electromagnétisme macroscopique et métamatériaux (EPSILON)
- Groupe Signaux Multidimensionnels (GSM)
- Hyperfrequency, Instrumentation, Processing, Experimentation (HIPE)
- Interaction Laser Matière (ILM)
- Molecular Imaging for Personalized Theranostic Applications (IMOTHEP)
- MOSAIC group: specialized in optical microscopy techniques, especially bioimaging (note: mosaic is not an acronym)
- PHYsique et Traitement de l'Image (PhyTI)
- Recherche en matériaux, composants et technologies de Couches Minces Optiques (RCMO)
- Sondage ElectroMagnétique, Optique (SEMO)

== Directors ==
The institute's present and former directors are listed below in reverse chronological order:

- Sophie Brasselet (2020–present)
- Stefan Enoch (2012–2019)
- Hugues Giovannini (2008–2011)
- Claude Amra (2000–2008)
