= Gay-Lussac–Humboldt Prize =

The Gay-Lussac–Humboldt Prize is a German–French science prize. It was created in 1981 by French President Valéry Giscard d'Estaing and German Chancellor Helmut Schmidt based on the recommendation of the German and French research ministries. The prize money is €60,000.

The prize is awarded to researchers that have made outstanding contributions in science, especially in cooperation between the two countries. Four to five German and French scientists from all research disciplines are honored with this award every year. The prize was originally named after Alexander von Humboldt and carries since 1997 the double name Gay-Lussac–Humboldt. The Gay-Lussac–Humboldt Award is granted by the French Ministry of Higher Education and Research to German researchers nominated by French researchers. On the other hand, it is awarded by the Alexander von Humboldt Foundation to French researchers nominated by German scientists.

== Prize winners ==
Year	Recipients
1982	Heinz Jürgen Schulz, Jean-Marie Lehn, Paul Hagenmuller
1983	Alain Bensoussan, Alain Bourret, Ernst Priesner, Gernot Wolfgang Heger, Hermann Kühn, Holger Martin, Jean Riess, Jules A. Hoffmann, Pierre-Gilles de Gennes, Pierre-Paul Sagave
1984	Christoph Reigber, Christos Flytzanis, Georges Martin, Heindirk tom Dieck, Jean Renaud Garel, Karl Bauer, Marie-France Vigneras, Wolf Lepenies
1985	Jeff Schell, Pierre Fromageot, René Pillorget
1986	Benno Müller-Hill, Georg Michael Kalvius, Gerd Lüttig, Henri C. Benoit, Herbert W. Roesky, Jean-Marie Valentin, Robert Vinh Mau, Rudolf Vierhaus, Nicolaas Hendrik Kuiper
1987	Erhard W. Fischer, François Mathey, Guy Ourisson, Hans Robert Jauss, Jean Guern, Jean Lemaitre, Jean Meyer, Jean-Marie Basset, Joachim Schwermer, Pierre Braunstein, Pierre Prigent, Raymond Weiss
1988	Achim Richter, Burkhart Lutz, Didier Astruc, François Gros, Janine Chasseguet-Smirgel, Jens Wittenburg, Joseph Lorius, Karol A. Penson, Louis Cohen Van Delft, Manfred Regitz, Marc Julia
1989	Daniel Poirion, Frank Steglich, Kurt Mehlhorn, Maurice Godelier, Michel E. Goldberg, Peter Haasen, Pierre-Henri Dixneuf, Roland Bergere, Wolfgang A. Herrmann
1990	Bernhard Korte, Claude Cohen-Tannoudji, Dietrich E. Wolf, Heinrich Betz, Henri Bouas-Laurent, Johann-Matthias Graf von der Schulenburg, Ladislas Kubin, Ulrich Trottenberg, Yves Jeannin
1991	Daniel Tondeur, Franz Effenberger, Fritz Nies, Hartmut Fuess, Jens Frehse, Marcel Veneroni, Monique Aumailley, Oriol Bohigas, Paul Lagarde, Robert Jean-Pierre Corriu, Serge Haroche, Sucharit Bhakdi
1992	Claude Detraz, Dietrich Stauffer, Erwin Weiss, Fritz Eckstein, Georges Ripka, Gerd Haupt, Helmut Ringsdorf, Jean Rouxel, Jean-Michel Grandmont, Magda Ericson, Michel Fromont, Michel Guelin, Rainer Buckdam
1993	Axel Brennicke, Claude Bardos, George Comsa, Heiner Zieschang, Henri Brunner, Jacques Lahaye, Joël Menard, Louis Hay, Paul Kienle, Pierre Corvol
1994	Bernard Julia, Borislav Bogdanović, Dima Grigoriev, Emanuel Vogel, Guy Bertrand, Günther Malle, Jacques F. Arvieux, Jean-Marc Richard, Klaus Rajewski, Wolfram Saenger, Wolfram von Oertzen
1995	Alan Kirman, Albrecht W. Hoffmann, Henri Cabannes, Jean-Pierre Majoral, Karl Wieghart, Mannque Rho, Peter Schneider, Rolf Kemler
1996	Armin de Meijere, Dieter Gerlich, Florian Pop, Hans-Joachim Körner, Heinz Dürr, Jean-François Dubremetz, Michel Rohmer, Philippe Ciarlet
1997	Florian Holsboer, Heinrich Rüterjans, Helmut Knötzinger, Karl G. Roesner, Michel Che, Robert Nicolai, Ulrich Rudolph, Werner Hildenbrand
1998	Jean Galy, Jean-Marie Flaud
1999	Alain Aspect, Alfred Trautwein, André Mysyrowicz, Henning Hopf, Jean-Paul Poirier, Michael Rapoport
2000	Dominique Vautherin, Gerd Röpke, Gunther Teubner, Heino Finkelmann, Jacques Le Rider, Michel Orrit, Peter Bastian, Pierre Coullet, Roger Hekinian, Rolf Reichardt, Wolfgang Meyerhof
2001	Achim Müller, Alain Ricard, Alfred Hüller, Andreas Herrmann, Christoph Gusy, Claude R. Henry, Gérard Jaouen, Immo Appenzeller
2002	Andreas Liselotte Von Hülsen-Esch, Bernard Meunier, Hanns Ullrich, Hans Föllmer, Jean-Marc Fontaine, Jean-Marc Moura, Reinhard Schinke, Roland Benz
2003	Christian Bordé, Géraud Sénizergues, Hartmut Kaelble, Janos Riesz, Jean Zinn-Justin, Klaus Fraedrich, Marie-Paule Pileni, Michel Broyer, Paul G. Reinhard, Pierre Agostini, Rudolf Treumann
2004	Christoph Krampe, Denis-Didier Rousseau, Gérard Férey, Hannah Monyer, Henri Berestycki, Herold Dehling, Jürgen Kreft, Peter Schuck, Roland Oberhänsli
2005	Adnan Ibrahimbegovic, Dieter Lüst, Eric Boëda, Helmut Oeschler, Hervé Bocherens, Horst Möller, Josef Deutscher, Padma Kant Shukla
2006	Bernd Weisshaar, Bruno Chaudret, Christoph Schweigert, Georges Didi-Huberman, Helmuth Möhwald, Ludger Wöste, Olaf Pongs, Olivier Jouanjan, Reinhard Wilhelm, Yannick Mellier
2007	Abdelhak Djouadi, Christian Sanchez, Friedhelm Bechstedt, Hans-Joachim Werner, Jean Jacod, Johannes Masing, Jörg Hacker, Jörg Rüpke, Patrice Pavis, Vladimir Kazakov
2008	Constance Grewe
2009	Claus M. Schneider, Hartmut Herrmann, Jean-Pierre Jacquot, Marc Mézard, Martin Möller, Rainer Schröder, Roland Netz, Thomas Nicolas Zemb
2010	Anne-Laure Boulesteix, Constantin Bachas, Daniel Schönpflug, Joseph Zyss, Karsten Suhre, Konrad Vössing, Vitalyi Gusev, Volker Schomerus, Yves Brechet
2011	Christophe Salomon, Hubert Garavel, Karl-Josef Dietz, Matthias Beller, Michel Espagne, Pascal Richet, Vladimir Fateev
2012	Elisabeth Giacobino, Hendrik Ziegler, Hermann Nicolai, Jean-Michel Raimond
2013	Alain Pumir, Alexandre Tsybakov, Alois Fürstner, Carmen Buchrieser, Christian Henriot, Costas Kounnas, Emilian Dudas, Michel Delon, Mir Wais Hosseini, Nikolai Nadirashvili, Oliver Eickelberg, Roger Ohayon
2014	Albert Fert, Nicolas Rouhier, Thomas Keller, Volker Meyer, Werner Kunz
2015	Cordelia Schmid, Jocelyn Benoist, Markus Antonietti, Papa Samba Diop, Stephan Schlemmer
2016	Albrecht Poglitsch, Hermann Matthies
2017	Johannes Orphal, Susanne Rau
2019	Arthur Jacobs, Frank Glorius, Alexandre Bouzdine
2020	Thomas Henning
2021	Véronique Gayrard
2022	Xiaonan Ma
