= Schmale =

Schmale is a surname. Notable people with the surname include:

- Antonia Schmale (born 1980), German former footballer
- Jamie Schmale, Canadian politician
- Julia Schmale, German environmental scientist

== See also ==
- Schmale Heide, is a 9.5-kilometre-long and roughly 2-kilometre-wide bar on the German island of Rügen
- Schmale Gera, is a river of Thuringia, Germany
- Schmale Sinn, is a river of Bavaria and Hesse, Germany
