= Linderbach =

Linderbach may refer to:

- Linderbach (Gramme), a river of Thuringia, Germany, tributary of the Gramme
- Linderbach, Erfurt, a district of the city Erfurt, Thuringia, Germany
