= Johannes Orphal =

German physicist

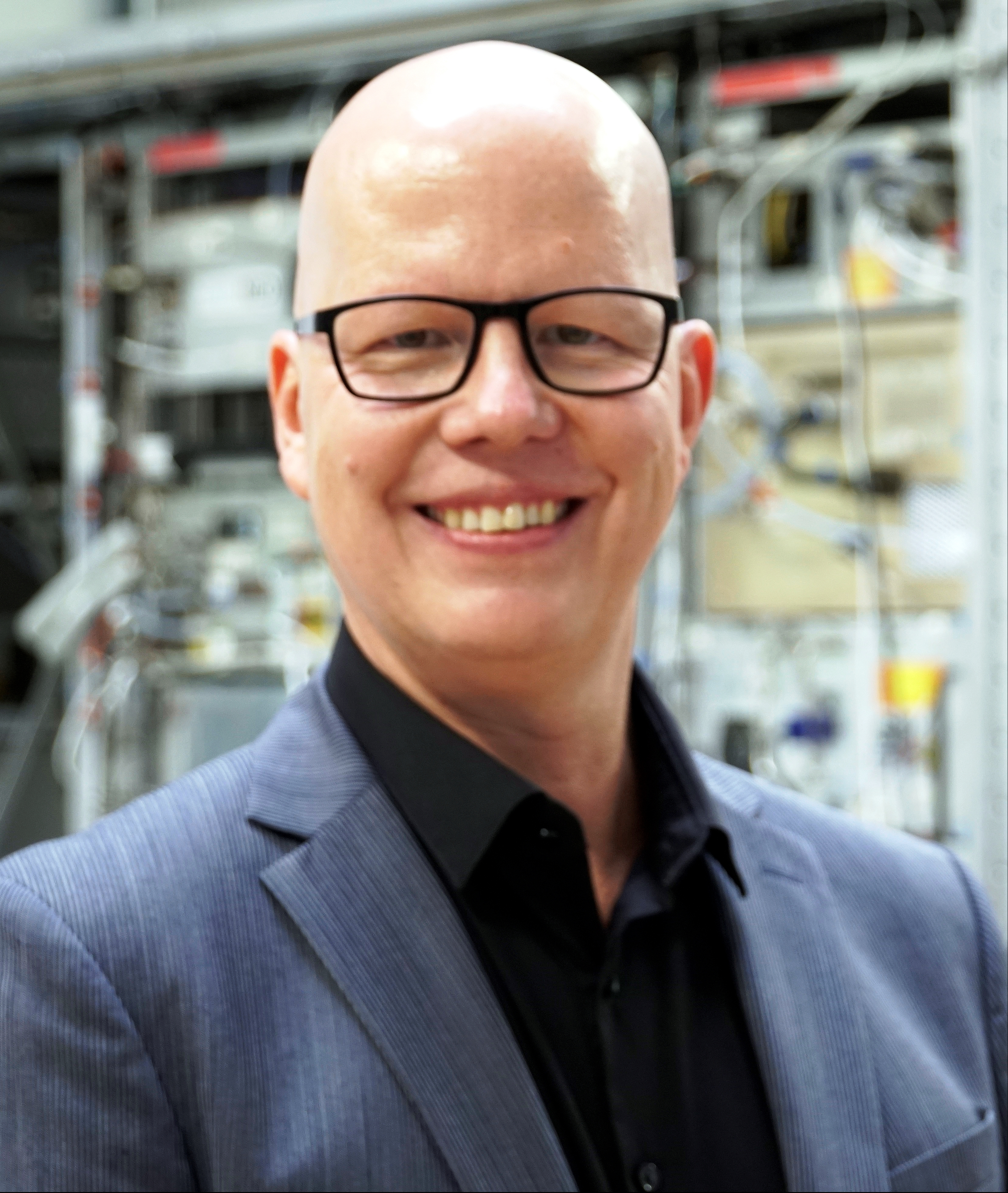
Orphal, Head of Division 4, Karlsruhe Institute of Technology

Johannes Orphal (born 11 July 1966, in Magdeburg) is a German physicist. He is Head of Division 4 "Natural and Built Environment" and Full Professor of Physics at the Karlsruhe Institute of Technology (KIT). From 2009 to 2020 he was Director of the Institute of Meteorology and Climate Research (IMK) at KIT. Until 2009, he was Professor at the University of Paris-Est in Créteil and research scientist at the CNRS.

In 2005, Orphal served as Secretary of the Organizing Committee for the Opening Ceremonies of the World Year of Physics at UNESCO headquarters in Paris.

His main scientific contributions are in the field of molecular spectroscopy applied to the Earth's atmosphere: laboratory measurements of unstable and reactive molecules and radicals, data evaluation for international databases e.g. HITRAN, preparation and use of remote-sensing satellite missions (GOME, SCIAMACHY, MIPAS, MetOp, MTG ...) to observe stratospheric chemistry, tropospheric air quality and processes of relevance for climate, as well as the development of sensitive in-situ measurements techniques such as IBBCEAS.

In 2017, he was awarded the Gentner-Kastler Prize of the French and German Physical Societies (SFP and DPG) and the Gay-Lussac Humboldt Prize of the Académie des sciences in Paris.
