= Constantine Dragases =

Constantine Dragases (Greek: Κωνσταντίνος Δραγάσης, Konstantínos Dragáses) may refer to:

- Constantine Dragaš, Serbian Prince of Velebusdos; Serres, Greece; and the Struma River valley in western Bulgaria
- Constantine XI Palaiologos, nicknamed Constantine Dragases, the last Byzantine emperor
- Colonel Constantine Dragasès is a fictitious character, the commander of the military unit dispatched by the President to the French Mediterranean Coast in Jean Raspail’s novel The Camp of the Saints
