= Priesner =

Priesner is a German surname. Notable people with the surname include:

- Claus Priesner (born 1947), German historian of science
- Ernst Priesner (1934–1994), Austrian zoologist
- Hermann Priesner (1891–1974), Austrian entomologist
