= Véronique Gayrard =

French mathematician

Véronique Gayrard is a French mathematician specializing in probability and statistical physics, with research topics including Hopfield networks, the long-term behavior of the random energy model and similar glassy systems, and metastability in reversible diffusion. She is a director of research for the French National Centre for Scientific Research (CNRS), affiliated with the Marseille Institute of Mathematics (I2M) operated jointly by CNRS and Aix-Marseille University. At I2M, she is affiliated with the research group on the mathematics of randomness (ALEA), which she headed from 2015 to 2021.

== Education ==
Gayrard earned her doctorate in 1993 through the University of the Mediterranean Aix-Marseille II, now part of Aix-Marseille University. Her dissertation, Contribution à l'étude rigoureuse des modèles de Hoppfiel [Contributions to the rigorous study of Hopfield models], was supervised by Pierre Picco.

== Recognition ==
In December 2021, Gayrard was named as one of the winners of the Gay-Lussac Humboldt Prize, an annual award of the governments of France and Germany honoring outstanding binational contributions in all areas of science. The award was based in part on her long and prolific collaborations with Anton Bovier, a mathematician at the Institute of Applied Mathematics of the University of Bonn.
