= Jean-Marie Lehn =

French chemist, Nobel laureate (born 1939)

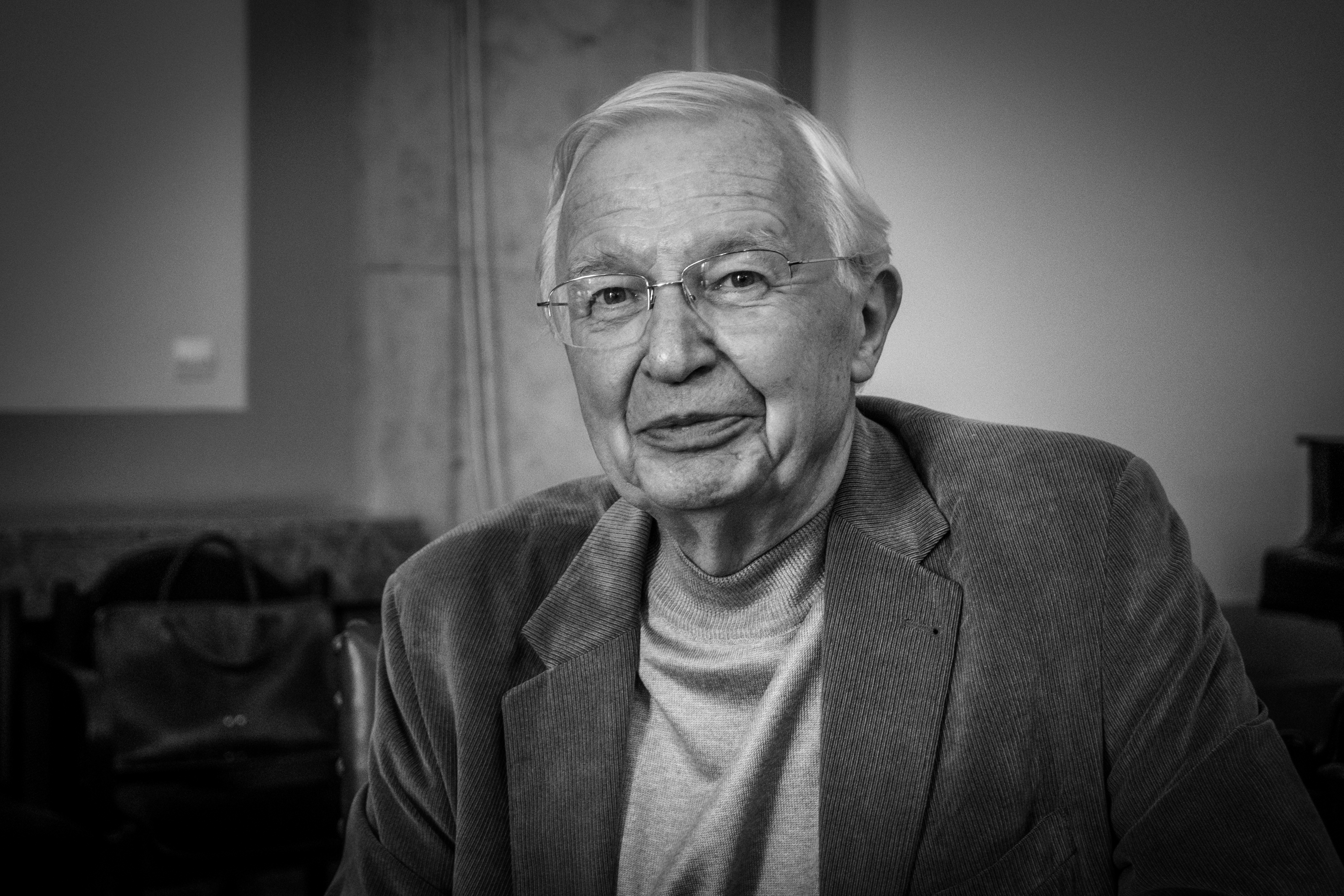
- Lehn in 2018
- Born: 30 September 1939 (age 86); Rosheim, Bas-Rhin, France
- Education: University of Strasbourg
- Known for: Cryptands
- Awards: Nobel Prize in Chemistry (1987); Davy Medal (1997)
- Scientific career
- Fields: Supramolecular chemistry
- Workplaces: University of Strasbourg; Collège de France
- Thesis: Résonance magnétique nucléaire de triterpènes (1963)
- Doctoral advisor: Guy Ourisson
- Doctoral students: Jean-Pierre Sauvage

Jean-Marie Pierre Lehn (born 30 September 1939) is a French chemist who received the Nobel Prize in Chemistry together with Donald Cram and Charles Pedersen in 1987 for his synthesis of cryptands. Lehn was an early innovator in the field of supramolecular chemistry, i.e., the chemistry of host–guest molecular assemblies created by intermolecular interactions, and continues to innovate in this field. He described the process by which molecules recognize each other. Drugs, for example, "know" which cell to destroy and which to let live. According to information provided by Lehn to the Nobel Foundation in January 2006, his group had published 790 peer-reviewed articles in chemistry literature by then.

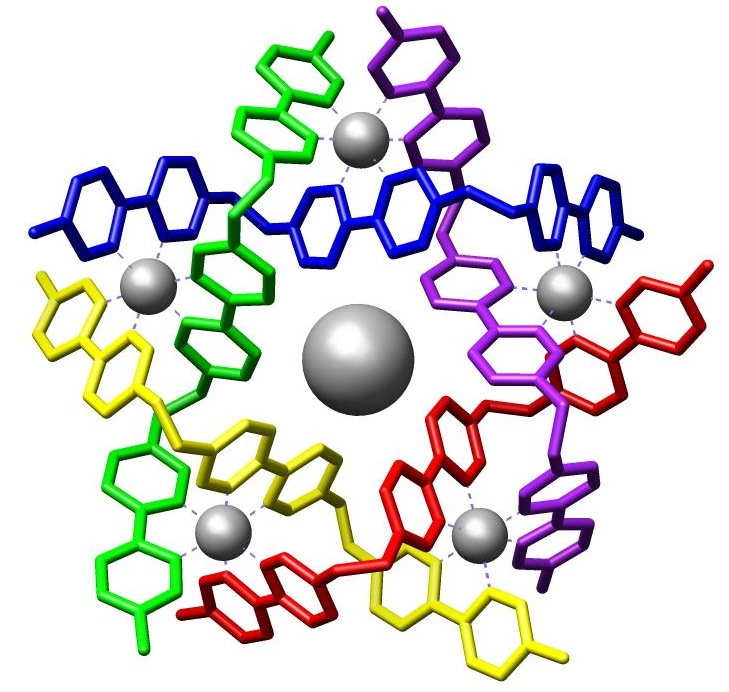
A circular helical assembly reported by Jean-Marie Lehn et al. in Angew. Chem., Int. Ed. Engl. 1996, 35, 1838–1840.

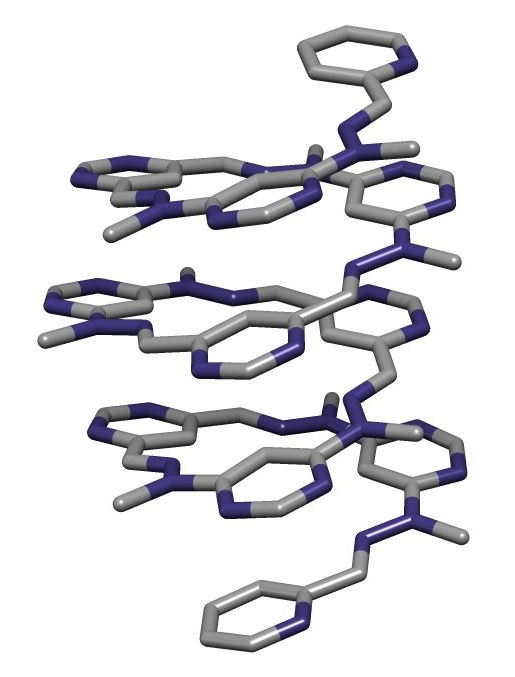
Crystal structure of a foldamer reported by Lehn et al. in Helv. Chim. Acta., 2003, 86, 1598–1624.

== Biography ==
=== Early years ===
Lehn was born in Rosheim, Alsace, France to Pierre and Marie Lehn. He is of Alsatian German descent. His father was a baker, but because of his interest in music, he later became the city organist. Lehn also studied music, saying that it became his major interest after science. He has continued to play the organ throughout his professional career as a scientist. His high school studies in Obernai, from 1950 to 1957, included Latin, Greek, German, and English languages, French literature, and he later became very keen of both philosophy and science, particularly chemistry. In July 1957, he obtained the baccalauréat in philosophy, and in September of the same year, the baccalauréat in Natural Sciences.

At the University of Strasbourg, although he considered studying philosophy, he ended up taking courses in physical, chemical and natural sciences, attending the lectures of Guy Ourisson, and realizing that he wanted to pursue a research career in organic chemistry. He joined Ourisson's lab, working his way to the Ph.D. There, he was in charge of the lab's first NMR spectrometer, and published his first scientific paper, which pointed out an additivity rule for substituent induced shifts of proton NMR signals in steroid derivatives. He obtained his Ph.D., and went to work for a year at Robert Burns Woodward's laboratory at Harvard University, working among other things on the synthesis of vitamin B12.

=== Career ===
In 1966, he was appointed a position as maître de conférences (assistant professor) at the Chemistry Department of the University of Strasbourg. His research focused on the physical properties of molecules, synthesizing compounds specifically designed for exhibiting a given property, in order to better understand how that property was related to structure.

In 1968, he achieved the synthesis of cage-like molecules, comprising a cavity inside which another molecule could be lodged. Organic chemistry enabled him to engineer cages with the desired shape, thus only allowing a certain type of molecule to lodge itself in the cage. This was the premise for an entire new field in chemistry, sensors. Such mechanisms also play a great role in molecular biology.

These cryptands, as Lehn dubbed them, became his main center of interest, and led to his definition of a new type of chemistry, "supramolecular chemistry", which instead of studying the bonds inside one molecule, looks at intermolecular attractions, and what would be later called "fragile objects", such as micelles, polymers, or clays.

In 1980, he was elected to become a teacher at the prestigious Collège de France, and in 1987 was awarded the Nobel Prize, alongside Donald Cram and Charles Pedersen for his works on cryptands.

In 1998, he established and directed a research group at the Institute of Nanotechnology at the Karlsruhe Institute of Technology

He is currently a member of the Reliance Innovation Council which was formed by Reliance Industries Limited, India.

As of 2021, Lehn has an h-index of 154 according to Google Scholar and of 137 (946 documents) according to Scopus.

== Legacy ==
In 1987, Pierre Boulez dedicated a very short piano work Fragment d‘une ébauche to Lehn on the occasion of his Nobel Prize in Chemistry.

== Personal life ==
Lehn was married in 1965 to Sylvie Lederer, and together they had two sons, David and Mathias.

Lehn is an atheist.

== Honors and awards ==
Lehn has won numerous awards and honors including:

Jean-Marie Lehn, UNESCO 2011

=== French awards and decorations ===
- CNRS Gold medal (1981; Silver Medal: 1972; Bronze Medal: 1963)
- Knight of the Ordre des Palmes académiques (1989)
- Officer of the Ordre national du Mérite (1993; Knight: 1976)
- Grand Officer of the Légion d'Honneur (2014; Commander: 1996; Officer: 1988; Knight: 1983)

=== Other international and national awards ===
- Elected an International Member of the United States National Academy of Sciences (1980)
- Elected a Member of the American Academy of Arts and Sciences (1980)
- Humboldt Prize (1983)
- Elected a Foreign Member of the Royal Netherlands Academy of Arts and Sciences (1983)
- Nobel Prize in Chemistry (1987)
- Elected a Member of the American Philosophical Society (1987)
- Pour le Mérite (1990)
- Elected a Foreign Member of the Royal Society (ForMemRS) in 1993
- The Davy Medal of the Royal Society (1997)
- Austrian Cross of Honour for Science and Art, 1st class (2001)
- Grand Officer of the Order of Cultural Merit of Romania (2004)
- Gutenberg Lecture Award (2006)
- ISA Medal for Science (2006)
- Knight Commander's Cross of the Order of Merit of the Federal Republic of Germany (2009)
- Order of the Rising Sun (Gold and Silver Star) of Japan (2019)

=== Honorary degrees ===
Lehn has received numerous Honorary Doctorates, namely from:

1. Hebrew University of Jerusalem, 1984
2. Autonomous University of Madrid, 1985
3. Georg-August University of Göttingen, 1987
4. Université libre de Bruxelles, 1987
5. University of Crete (Iraklion University), 1989
6. Università degli Studi di Bologna, 1989
7. Charles University of Prague, 1990
8. University of Sheffield, 1991
9. University of Twente, 1991
10. University of Athens, 1992
11. National Technical University of Athens (Polytechnical University of Athens), 1992
12. Illinois Wesleyan University, 1995
13. Université de Montréal, 1995
14. Bielefeld University, 1998
15. Honorary Professor, University of Science and Technology of China, Hefei, 1998
16. Honorary Professor, Southeast University, Nanjing, 1998
17. Weizmann Institute of Science, Rehovot, 1998
18. Faculté des Sciences Appliquées, Université libre de Bruxelles, 1999
19. Nagoya University, 2000
20. Université de Sherbrooke, 2000
21. Università di Trieste, 2001
22. Honorary Professor, Shanghai Jiao Tong University, 2003
23. Honorary Professor, Nanjing University, 2003
24. Royal Institute of Technology, Stockholm, 2003
25. University of St. Andrews, 2004
26. Heriot Watt University, Edinburgh, 2005
27. Peter the Great St. Petersburg Polytechnic University (Technical University, St Petersburg), 2005
28. Masaryk University, Brno, 2005
29. Honorary Professor, Beijing University, 2005
30. Kyushu University, 2005
31. Moscow State University, 2006
32. Aristotle University of Thessaloniki, 2006
33. Kazan Federal University, 2006
34. Novosibirsk State University, 2006
35. Honorary Professor, Zhejiang University, Hangzhou, 2007
36. Honorary Professor, Shaanxi Normal University, Xi’an, 2007
37. Special Honorary Professorship, Osaka Prefecture University, Sakai, 2008
38. University of Patras, 2008
39. Babeș-Bolyai University, Cluj-Napoca, 2008
40. University of Basilicata, Potenza, 2008
41. Taras Shevchenko National University of Kyiv, 2009
42. Technion – Israel Institute of Technology, 2009
43. University of Ljubljana, 2009
44. City University of Hong Kong, 2010
45. Queen's University Belfast, 2012
46. Honorary Professor, Novosibirsk State University, 2012
47. Honorary Professor, Xiamen University, 2012
48. Honorary Professor, Jilin University, 2013
49. Honorary Professor, Shanxi University, 2013
50. University of Oxford, 2014
51. Macau University of Science and Technology (MUST), 2015
52. University of Málaga, 2015
53. Honorary Professor, Kyushu University, 2016
54. Honorary Professor, China Pharmaceutical University, 2016
55. Honorary Professor, Wuhan University of Technology, 2016
56. Institute of Chemical Technology, Mumbai, 2017
57. University of Cambridge, 2017
58. New York University, 2017
59. University of Bucharest, 2018
60. University of Vienna, 2019
61. University of Chemistry and Technology, Prague, 2019

== Books ==
- Lehn, Jean-Marie (April 1995). Supramolecular Chemistry. Weinheim: Wiley-VCH. ISBN 978-3-527-29311-7.
