= Torleif Ericson =

Swedish physicist

Torleif Erik Oskar Ericson
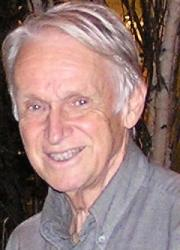
- Torleif Ericson
- Born: November 2, 1930 (age 95); Lund, Sweden
- Education: Lund University
- Known for: Ericson-Ericson Lorentz-Lorenz correction Ericson fluctuations
- Spouse: Magda Ericson
- Awards: Professors namn (Title of Professor), Sweden, 1976 Foreign member of the Finnish Society of Sciences and Letters, 1990; Honorary professor, Shanghai Advanced Research Institute, Chinese Academy of Sciences, 1990; Member of the Royal Swedish Academy of Sciences, 1993 Member of the Royal Society of Sciences in Uppsala, 1994
- Scientific career
- Fields: Nuclear physics Particle physics
- Workplaces: Lund University; Nordita; Massachusetts Institute of Technology (MIT); UC Berkeley; European Organization for Nuclear Research (CERN); Uppsala University

Torleif Erik Oskar Ericson (born November 2, 1930) is a Swedish nuclear theoretical physicist. He is known for 'Ericson fluctuations' and the 'Ericson-Ericson Lorentz-Lorenz effect'. His research has nurtured the link between nuclear and particle physics.

== Biography ==
=== Career ===
Ericson studied physics at Lund University, from where he obtained his PhD, under the supervision of Ben Mottelson at the Nordic Institute for Theoretical Physics (Nordita), in 1958.

Ericson held positions as a postdoctoral researcher and an instructor at MIT and as Visiting scientist at Berkeley from 1959 to 1960.

Following he joined CERN’s Theory Division, first as a fellow, and then as a staff member in 1962. He was recruited by the Director-General, V. F. Weisskopf, as the theoretical interface between particle and nuclear physics.

Sabbatical year 1969/70 at MIT.

Invited guest professor at Geneva, Lausanne, Louvain, Tokyo and Uppsala.

Adjunct professor at Uppsala University from 1993 within the framework of CERN's collaboration with Member States.

Official retirement from CERN in 1995, but still emeritus (honorary member of the personnel).

=== Research contributions ===
Moving from MIT to Berkeley he wrote two papers in which he predicted what later became known as 'Ericson fluctuations' and today is considered a prime example of quantum chaos. Initially the idea was met with resistance. However, the prediction stimulated in a large number of nuclear reaction studies, as reviewed a few years later with Mayer-Kuckuk, and Ericson continued to develop the consequences in depth in a series of articles.

In 1963, Ericson, after an initiative by A. de-Shalit and V.F. Weisskopf, organised an international conference on high-energy physics and nuclear structure. The meeting turned out to be of significant importance both for Ericson's own career and the development of this field, as a new branch of nuclear physics. The conference series, later generally referred to as PANIC, was the start of the field interfacing nuclear and particle physics and has developed into a triennial event. The series is sponsored by the International Union of Pure and Applied Physics and has been going on since then.

In the 1960's much information in this field came from exotic atoms. This was limited but precise information. In this context Ericson studied how nuclei and particles manifest dielectric constants and magnetic susceptibilities in external fields. Furthermore, Ericson, together with his wife Magda Ericson, were among the first to focus on the interaction of pions with nuclei and to study a regime that was intermediate between the low energies of traditional nuclear physics and elementary particles of higher energies. In particular the Ericsons realized that the pion behavior in nuclei is changed and that this produces major effects. This became known as the 'Ericson-Ericson Lorentz-Lorenz effect' and has later influenced other areas of many-body physics.

His interest in the quantitatively limits of pion physics in nuclei produced some of the most accurate and parameter-free descriptions of observables in the entire nuclear physics.

He took interest in many different areas of physics. Together with J. Bernabeu and C. Jarlskog, he realized that neutral currents imply parity violations, which are strongly enhanced in certain muonic atoms. He also developed an accurate test of T-violation in nuclei based on fluctuations, as well as an accurate empirical bound for anti-gravity.

The activity on the interface between nuclear and particle physics led to that CERN set up various scientific committees, in which Ericson was deeply involved.

=== Administrative activities ===
In his role as chairman of the Nuclear Structure Committee, Ericson proposed in 1964, to build an on-line isotope separator, which later has become known as ISOLDE. CERN eventually established its ultrarelativistic heavy-ion programme that over the years has attracted a large number of experimental physicists to the laboratory.

In addition to carry out his research, Ericson has taken on a series of managerial tasks. For several periods he filled the role as deputy leader for the CERN Theory Division, he chaired the CERN Nuclear Structure Committee, served as a member of the CERN Physics III Committee, Swedish Program Committee for Physics and in the IUPAP body International Committee for High Intensity Accelerators (ICHIA). Furthermore, Ericson was associated editor in the journal Nuclear Physics A, with responsibility for intermediate energy, from 1976 to 2000. Since 1991 he is one of the general editors of the series Cambridge Monographs on Particle Physics, Nuclear Physics and Cosmology. Ericson has also been editor for a large number of conference proceedings.

== Awards and honors ==
- 1976: Title of Professor (Swedish: Professors namn) awarded by the Government of Sweden
- 1990: Foreign member of the Finnish Society of Sciences and Letters
- 1990: Honorary professor, Shanghai Advanced Research Institute, Chinese Academy of Sciences
- 1993: Member of the Royal Swedish Academy of Sciences
- 1994: Member of the Royal Society of Sciences in Uppsala

== Private life ==
Ericson is married to the French physicist Magda Ericson since 1957. Together they have two adult children. The Ericsons reside in Geneva, Switzerland.

== Bibliography ==
=== Books ===
- 1991: The meson factories. Univ. California Press.
- 1991: Piony i jadra. Moskva : Nauka, Russian translation of "Pions and nuclei" (1988).
- 1988: Pions and nuclei. Clarendon Press.

=== Articles ===
- Full list of articles indexed in Google Scholar, indexed in Inspire-HEP.

== External links and further reading ==
- Celebration in Honour of Magda and Torleif Ericson's 80th Birthday
- Festschrift for Torleif Ericson
- Stroke, H. Henry (1999-04-23). The Physical Review: The First Hundred Years. Springer Science & Business Media. ISBN 978-1-56396-188-5.
- Brown, G.E. (1990). "The Ericson-Ericson Lorentz-Lorenz correction". Nuclear Physics A. 518 (1–2): 99–115. Bibcode:1990NuPhA.518...99B. doi:10.1016/0375-9474(90)90537-V.
