= Linderbach (Gramme) =

Location
- Country: Germany
- States: Thuringia

Physical characteristics
- Mouth
  - location: Gramme
  - coordinates: 51°1′36″N 11°8′6″E

Basin features
- Progression: Gramme→ Unstrut→ Saale→ Elbe→ North Sea

Linderbach is a river in Thuringia, Germany. It flows into the Gramme near Großmölsen.

== See also ==
- List of rivers of Thuringia
