= The Camp of the Saints =

1973 novel by Jean Raspail

- Cover of the first edition
- Author: Jean Raspail
- Original title: Le Camp des Saints
- Translator: Norman Shapiro
- Language: French
- Publisher: Éditions Robert Laffont (France); Scribner (United States)
- Publication date: 1973
- Publication place: France
- English publication date: 1975
- Media type: Print (hardback and paperback)
- Pages: 408
- ISBN: 0-684-14240-6 1st Scribner edition
- OCLC: 1252311
- Dewey Decimal: 843.914
- LC Class: PQ2635.A379 C3

The Camp of the Saints (French: Le Camp des Saints) is a 1973 French dystopian fiction novel by Jean Raspail. A speculative fictional account, it depicts the destruction of Western civilization through mass Third World immigration to France and the Western world. The name of the book comes from a passage in the Book of Revelation depicting the apocalypse. Almost 40 years after its initial publication, the novel returned to the bestseller list in 2011. It was first published in French in 1973 by Éditions Robert Laffont. It was first translated into English by Norman Shapiro, and first published in English by Scribner in 1975.

On its publication, the book received praise from some prominent French literary figures, and through time has also been praised by some critics and politicians in Europe and the United States. It has also been criticized by both French and English-language commentators for conveying racist, xenophobic, nativist, and anti-immigration themes. The novel is popular within far-right and white nationalist circles.

== Background ==
The novel was authored by novelist and explorer Jean Raspail. He had written several books before The Camp of the Saints, mostly travel works or adventure fiction. Several sources noted the book to be very different from the rest of his writings. Raspail has said his inspiration came while at the French Riviera in 1972, as he was looking out at the Mediterranean, he had a "vision":

A million poor wretches, armed only with their weakness and their numbers, overwhelmed by misery, encumbered with starving brown and black children, ready to disembark on our soil, the vanguard of the multitudes pressing hard against every part of the tired and overfed West. I literally saw them, saw the major problem they presented, a problem absolutely insoluble by our present moral standards. To let them in would destroy us. To reject them would destroy them.

In May of that year, he published a column outlining the novel. Raspail spent ten months writing the book. During this time, he said this "vision" "never left me"; he described the book as a kind of emotional outpour. The name of the book comes from a passage in Revelation 20:7–9 in which Satan gathers an army from the nations of the earth and encircles "the camp of the saints". In Raspail's story, the camp of the saints is Europe and Satan's army is a migrant fleet of a million people sailing from India.

== Plot ==
In Calcutta, India, Catholic priests promote the adoption of Indian children by those back in Belgium as a form of charity. When the Belgian government realizes that the number of Indian children raised in Belgium has reached 40,000 in just five years, an emergency policy attempts to halt the migration. Desperate to send their children to the "land of plenty", a mob of Indians swarms the consulate. As a Belgian aid worker works through the crowd, an Indian gong farmer known only as "the turd eater", carrying his deformed child aloft, convinces him to take them back to Europe.

The worker and farmer bring the crowd to the docks, where hundreds of ships once owned by European powers now suit only river traffic. Nevertheless, the crowd boards, and a hundred ships soon leave for Europe; many passengers, including children, publicly fornicate on board in cramped, unsanitary and miserable conditions. As the ships pass "the straits of Ceylon", helicopters swarm overhead, capturing images of the migrants for publishing in Europe.

As the fleet crosses the Indian Ocean, the political situation in France becomes more charged. At a press conference about the crisis, a journalist confronts a pro-migrant official, demanding to know if France will "have the courage to stand up to" the migrants when they reach the country. The official finds the question morally offensive and threatens to throw the journalist out when he keeps yelling. Other journalists seek to inflame tensions between the French and Africans and Arabs already living in the country. They go on to write that the migrant fleet seeks to "enrich, cleanse and redeem the Capitalist West". As those in Paris praise the fleet, people in Southern France, terrified of the migrants' arrival, flee north.

As the fleet steers around the Cape of Good Hope, the apartheid regime of South Africa, to the surprise of observers, floats out barges of food and supplies, which the migrants throw overboard. The international press believes this to be a political statement against the regime. Western leaders, confident the migrants will accept supplies from their "more virtuous" nations, organize a supply mission to meet the migrants off São Tomé. However, the fleet does not stop for these barges either. When a worker from the Pope's barge attempts to board one of the ships, he is strangled and thrown overboard, which the press attempts to contain coverage of.

When the French president addresses the nation with his plan to repel the migrants passing through the Strait of Gibraltar, he breaks down and demands the troops follow their consciences. Most of the troops immediately desert their posts and join the civilians as they flee north, and migrants quickly overrun the South. Some of the last troops standing their ground take refuge in a small village, along with Calguès, an old man who chooses to remain at home, and Hamadura, a Westernized Indian terrified of his "filthy, brutish" countrymen. The village remains the last defense of Western values and "Free France" against the immigrants.

The immigrants make their way north, continuing to demand a First World standard of living, even as they flout laws, do not produce, and murder French citizens. Immigrants already residing in Europe join them, along with various left-wing and anarchist groups. Across the West, more and more migrants arrive and reproduce, rapidly outgrowing whites. In a matter of months, the white West is overrun, and pro-immigrant governments are established, while white people are ordered to share their houses and flats with the immigrants. The village containing the troops is bombed flat by airplanes of the new French government. Within a few years, most Western governments surrender.

The epilogue reveals that the story was written in the last holdout of the Western world, Switzerland. But international pressure from the new governments, isolating it as a rogue state for not opening its borders, along with internal pro-migrant elements, forces it to capitulate as well. Just hours before the border opens, the author dedicates the book to his grandchildren, hoping they will grow up in a world where they will not be ashamed of him for writing it.

== Publication history ==
The Camp of the Saints was first published in French in 1973 by Éditions Robert Laffont. The publisher believed the book would sell well, and to market the book printed 20,000 copies for an initial run and wrote over 350 letters marketing the book to established French booksellers. Upon its release, the book sold decently at about 15,000 copies. However, a word-of-mouth campaign (influenced by the news of the Vietnamese boat people) in the next few years increased its popularity, and it sold 40,000 copies in the next few years. The book continued to sell well and was reissued several times, including in 1981 and 1989 in paperback. It was reissued in hardcover in 2002.

An eighth French edition was published in February 2011, with a new preface called "Big Other". The publisher had initially refused to include "Big Other" for fear of being prosecuted for inciting racial hatred, but relented. To market this edition, Raspail appeared on Frédéric Taddeï's talk show, Ce soir ou jamais. In March 2011, the book returned to the bestseller list, ranking in the top five in bookstores in France, and by April 2011 this edition had sold 20,000 copies. All its editions have sold about half a million copies.

An English language translation by Norman Shapiro was published by Scribner in 1975. The publisher portrayed its publication as a major literary event, with a major ad-campaign that used the phrase "the end of the white world is near". The English translation sold well. It was republished in mass market paperback format in 1977 by Ace Books in New York and Sphere Books in London. John Tanton acquired the rights to the book in 1994 and printed a softcover edition through his publishing company The Social Contract Press in 1995. The Winter 1994-1995 issue of The Social Contract Journal was a special edition released to coincide with the new printing of the book, each article dedicated to discussion of the book and its themes. The book went out of print in English for several years, with print editions coming to cost hundreds of U.S. dollars. This changed in 2025 when the book received a second English translation, done by Ethan Rundell, and was republished by Vauban Books.

== Analysis ==
The Camp of the Saints is a work of dystopian or apocalyptic fiction. A key element of the text is the supposed vulnerability of the West, having lost its soul to materialism and a fixation on empty things in a period of decline and decay. Hence, Europe is deserving of extinction and the West so easily succumbs to mass migration in the narrative. The book's tone largely presents these events as hopeless or inevitable, increasingly apocalyptic as the story goes on. The empathy and pity of the West towards non-white peoples is portrayed extremely negatively by Raspail, who presents it as their defining weakness that leads to their destruction; the book extensively criticizes French elites, who, in Raspail's view, are blinded by guilt from colonization, Catholicism, and humanitarianism.

According to literary scholar Jean-Marc Moura, native French people are described in the novel as

[giving] in without a blow to the hyperbolic egalitarianism that 'swallows' them down to the rank of third-world men ... In such a context, racist deviations are inevitable ... The plot is thus biased, since the cards are dealt in such a way that racism and ostracism become conditions for survival. By painting the Third World in such aggressive colours, it gives Western characters little choice: destroy or die.

Raspail presents the West as seized by a sort of neurotic self-loathing of itself and all it stands for. Academic George Michael wrote that it was particularly the element of "a post–World War II Europe paralyzed by guilt" that was presented as making "the continent defenseless against the unwashed masses of the impoverished third world". A commentator for The Atlantic Monthly said that while the white characters are given depth, the non-white characters are uniformly disparaged and portrayed negatively, and their white sympathizers are portrayed even more negatively.

The novel is popular within far-right and white nationalist circles. In 2001, the Southern Poverty Law Center (SPLC) described The Camp of the Saints as "widely revered by American white supremacists" and "a sort of anti-immigration analog to The Turner Diaries", and attributed its popularity to the plot's parallels with the white genocide conspiracy theory. Ryan Lenz, a senior investigative reporter for the SPLC, notes that "[t]he premise of Camp of the Saints plays directly into that idea of white genocide. It is the idea that through immigration, if it's left unchecked, the racial character and content of a culture can be undermined to the point of oblivion." Political scientist Jean-Yves Camus argues that The Camp of the Saints, with its apocalyptic vision of a sudden and violent mass migration swarming towards Europe, is even more radical than Renaud Camus's Great Replacement theory, and therefore probably more influential on white nationalist terrorists.

== Reception ==
The book has been criticized by both French and English-language commentators for conveying racist, xenophobic, nativist, and anti-immigration themes.

=== Initial reception ===
The Camp of the Saints received an initially positive reception in France, including from prominent literary figures on the political right, many focusing on the "prophetic" nature of the story. Jean Cau, for example, wrote: "what if Raspail, with Le Camp des Saints, was neither a prophet nor a visionary novelist, but simply an implacable historian of our future?". It was praised by journalist Bernard Pivot and intellectuals such as Jean Anouilh, Hervé Bazin, Michel Déon, Thierry Maulnier, and Louis Pauwels. Anouilh called it "a haunting book of irresistible force and calm logic".

After the book was translated into English in 1975, it received several reviews from contemporary American outlets. Edmund Fuller wrote in The Wall Street Journal that "it is possible that [The Camp of the Saints] [...] projects the most savage view of the human race since the 4th voyage of Lemuel Gulliver." Fuller called it far-rightist in political orientation, but said it portrayed even the right-wingers badly. Fuller called it a "bitter, ugly, possibly destructive book", racist but with "moments of appalling power and occasionally a terrible beauty". Richard R. Lingeman of The New York Times called it "avowedly racist" and said the experience of reading the book was "like being trapped at a cocktail party with a normal‐looking fellow who suddenly starts a perfervid racist diatribe". Paul Gray writing for Time magazine panned the novel as a "bilious tirade" that only required a response because it "arrives trailing clouds of praise from French savants" and from an established publisher.

Kirkus Reviews compared the novel to Mein Kampf, while Library Journal said it would "succeed in shocking and challenging the complacent, contemporary mind", and called it a "philosophical dissection of the erosion of Western civilization". Publishers Weekly described it as "strange but remarkable", but with a certain inevitability of the plot that some readers may find unbearable. Kirkus said of the book that it "takes important and chilling facts that very few people are willing to face, and digs into them like a hyena into carrion". Dale G. Copps in Bookletter (a spinoff of Harper's Magazine) described the book as a "powerful one, there is no denying that", with Raspail in "perfect and intricate command of his theme", yet also "dogmatic and propagandistic". He described the author's voice as "virulently racist" and said the book was a defense of white supremacy; Copps said Raspail "treats the overwhelming liberal bias with such scorn one wonders why he felt the Western world was even worth saving".

Jeffrey Hart, in a National Review article, mocked the rejection of the novel by critics, deriding them as "respectable, comfortable reviewers", and lauded the book in those terms: "in freer and more intelligent circles in Europe, the book is a sensation and Raspail is a prize-winner [...] his plot is both simple and brilliant." Syndicated columnist Garry Wills condemned the embrace of the novel by the "more 'respectable' channels" of American right-wing media, including Jeffrey Hart, drawing parallels between the "racial implications" of the book and the National Review's "overtly racist analysis" of school integration efforts.

=== Later reception ===
In 1983, Linda Chavez called the novel "a sickening book", describing it as "racist, xenophobic and paranoid". In the early 1980s, the director of the French intelligence service SDECE, Alexandre de Marenches, gave a copy of the book to Ronald Reagan, who reportedly stated that he was "terribly impressed" with it. The December 1994 cover story of The Atlantic Monthly focused on the themes of the novel, analyzing them in the context of international relations, while describing it as "the most politically incorrect book in France in the second half of the twentieth century". The article claimed that the book had not received a positive reception in France, but its authors, British historian Paul Kennedy and Columbia professor Matthew Connelly wrote, "many members of the more prosperous economies are beginning to agree with Raspail's vision". Neo-conservative writer Daniel Pipes has cited the work in the context of the "Islamization of the European continent", while Ronald F. Maxwell, who sympathized with the book's themes, considered making a feature film out of the novel. Samuel P. Huntington was also influenced by the book.

In 2002, columnist Lionel Shriver described the novel as "both prescient and appalling", certainly "racist" but "written with tremendous verbal energy and passion". Shriver writes that the book "gives bilious voice to an emotion whose expression is increasingly taboo in the West, but that can grow only more virulent when suppressed: the fierce resentment felt by majority populations when that status seems threatened."

William F. Buckley Jr. praised the book in 2004 as "a great novel" that raised questions on how to respond to massive illegal immigration, and in 2014, Mackubin Thomas Owens noted Buckley's praise of it, while remarking that "Raspail was ahead of his time in demonstrating that Western civilization had lost its sense of purpose and history—its 'exceptionalism'." In 2005, the conservative Chilton Williamson praised the book as "one of the most uncompromising works of literary reaction in the 20th century". A review in The Times of the second English translation called it "savagely, even gleefully, racist" in its depiction of the migrants, but also "closely, horribly relevant to our dilemmas".

The book has become popular among some far-right politicians. It has been favorably referred to by Steve Bannon, U.S. President Donald Trump's former Chief Strategist. It has also been promoted by Trump's White House Deputy Chief of Staff for Policy and United States Homeland Security Advisor Stephen Miller, Republican congressman Steve King, French National Rally leader Marine Le Pen and former Hungarian Prime Minister Viktor Orbán. A 2001 report from the SPLC described the novel as "the favorite racist fantasy of the anti-immigrant movement in the US".

== See also ==
- List of dystopian literature
- The March, a 1990 movie with a similar plot
- Rivers of Blood speech, a 1968 anti-immigration speech by British politician Enoch Powell
- Submission, a 2015 French novel about a political takeover of France by Islamic fundamentalists
- European migrant crisis
