= Géraud Sénizergues =

French computer scientist

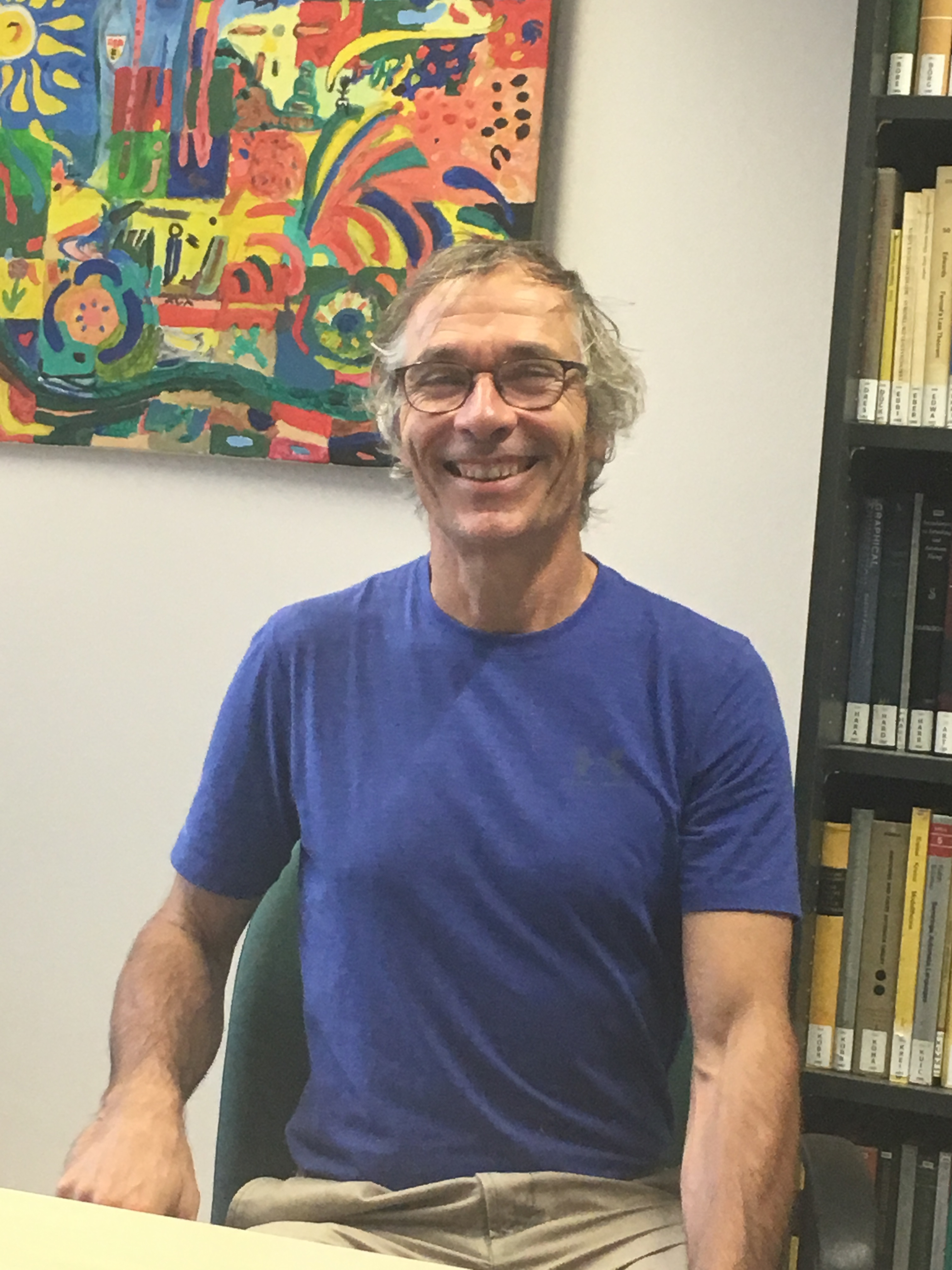
- Sénizergues in September 2017
- Born: 9 March 1957 (age 68)
- Awards: Gödel Prize (2002); Gay-Lussac Humboldt Prize (2003)
- Scientific career
- Fields: Computer science
- Institutions: University of Bordeaux
- Website: dept-info.labri.u-bordeaux.fr/~ges/

Géraud Sénizergues (born 9 March 1957) is a French computer scientist at the University of Bordeaux.

He is known for his contributions to automata theory, combinatorial group theory and abstract rewriting systems.

He received his Ph.D. (Doctorat d'état en Informatique) from the Université Paris Diderot (Paris 7) in 1987 under the direction of Jean-Michel Autebert.

With Yuri Matiyasevich he obtained results about the Post correspondence problem. He won the 2002 Gödel Prize "for proving that equivalence of deterministic pushdown automata is decidable". In 2003 he was awarded with the Gay-Lussac Humboldt Prize.
