= Michel Rohmer =

French chemist (born 1948)

Michel Rohmer, born on 31 January 1948, is a French chemist specialising in the chemistry of micro-organisms. He has particularly studied isoprenoids.

He is a member of the French Academy of sciences.

== Biography ==
Michel Rohmer studied at the École nationale supérieure de chimie in Strasbourg. He defended his thesis at the Louis-Pasteur University in Strasbourg in 1975 in Guy Ourisson's laboratory. He became professor of organic and bio-organic chemistry at the École nationale supérieure de chimie de Mulhouse from 1979 to 1994, then returned to the Université Louis-Pasteur in Strasbourg. He was Director of the Institut de chimie de Strasbourg (UMR 7177). Since 1 September 2013, he has been Professor Emeritus of the University of Strasbourg.

== Research ==
Michel Rohmer is working on isoprenoids, a class of natural substances familiar to all in the form of cholesterol in our cells. He studied hopanoids in particular, which are found in sedimentary rock materials. He then discovered biohopanoids, a family of pentacyclic triterpenoids. His work on the biosynthesis of these bacterial hopanoids is revolutionizing the understanding of the early stages of isoprenoid biosynthesis. Rohmer proposes a new biosynthetic pathway leading to the universal precursors of isoprenoids, isopentenyl and dimethylallyl diphosphates. This path is different from the mevalonate path that has been accepted for more than fifty years. The metabolic pathway of methylerythritol phosphate is widely distributed in bacteria, which are omnipresent in the chloroplasts of phototrophic organisms.

== Awards and honours ==
- Valiant Prize of the French Academy of sciences (1984)
- Gold medal of the Wallach Foundation, Mulhouse (1993)
- Franco-British Prize of the Royal Society and the French Academy of sciences (1993)
- Gay-Lussac Humboldt Prize of the Alexander von Humboldt Foundation (1997)
- Member of the Institut universitaire de France (1997)
- Member of the German Academy of Sciences Leopoldina (2000)
- Member of the French Academy of sciences (elected Correspondent on 15 April 1996 and Member on 18 November 2003)
- Nakanishi Prize, Japan Chemical Society and American Chemical Society (2008)
- Schroepfer Award, American Oil Chemists Society (2008)
- Albert Hofmann Award, University of Zurich, Switzerland (2008)

== Appendices ==
=== Related articles ===
- Isoprénoïdes
- Biosynthèse
- Microbiologie
- Enzymologie

=== External links ===
- Biographie
- Site de l'Institut de chimie de l'Université de Strasbourg

=== Bibliography ===
- H.K. Lichtenthaler, J. Schwender, A. Disch & M. Rohmer. Biosynthesis of isoprenoids in higher plant chloroplasts proceeds via a mevalonate independent pathway. FEBS Lett. 400, 271-274 (1997).
- A. Hemmerlin, J.F. Hoeffler, O. Meyer, D. Tritsch, I. Kagan, C. Grosdemange-Billiard, M. Rohmer & T.J. Bach. Crosstalk between the cytoplasmic mevalonate and the plastidial methylerythritol phosphate pathway in Tobacco Bright Yellow-2 cells, J. Biol. Chem. 278, 26666-26676 (2003).
- M. Seemann, B. Tse Sum Bui, M. Wolff, M. Miginiac-Maslow & M. Rohmer Isoprenoid biosynthesis in plant chloroplasts via the MEP pathway: direct thylakoid/ferredoxin-dependent photoreduction of GcpE/IspG, FEBS Lett. 580, 1547-1552 (2006).
- M. Rohmer, From molecular fossils of bacterial hopanoids to the formation of isoprene units: discovery and elucidation of the methylerythritol phosphate pathway. Lipids 43, 1095-1107 (2008).
- E. Gerber, A. Hemmerlin, M. Hartmann, D. Heintz, M.A. Hartmann, J. Mutterer, M. Rodríguez-Concepción, A. Boronat, A. Van Dorsselaer, M. Rohmer, D.N. Crowell & T.J. Bach, The plastidial 2-C-methyl-D-erythritol 4-phosphate pathway provides the isoprenyl moiety for protein geranylgeranylation in tobacco BY-2 cells, Plant Cell 21, 285-300 (2009).
- D. Tritsch, A. Hemmerlin, T.J. Bach & M. Rohmer, Plant isoprenoid biosynthesis via the MEP pathway: in vivo IPP/DMAPP ratio produced by (E)-hydroxy-3-methylbut-2-enyl diphosphate reductase in tobacco BY-2 cell cultures, FEBS Lett. 584, 129-134 (2010).
- A. Huchelmann, C. Gastaldo, M. Veinante, Y. Zeng, D. Heintz, D. Tritsch, H. Schaller, M. Rohmer, T.J. Bach & A. Hemmerlin, S-Carvone suppresses cellulase-induced capsidiol production in Nicotiana tabacum by interfering with protein isoprenylation, Plant Physiol. 164, 935-950 (2014).
- W. Liu, E. Sakr, P. Schaeffer, H.M. Talbot, J. Donisi, T. Härtner, E. Kannenberg, E. Takano & M. Rohmer, Ribosylhopane, a novel bacterial hopanoid as precursor of C_{35} bacteriohopanepolyols in Streptomyces coelicolor A3(2), ChemBioChem 15, 2156-2161 (2014).
- W. Liu, A. Bodlenner & M. Rohmer, Hemisynthesis of deuteriated adenosylhopane and conversion into bacteriohopanetetrol by a cell-free system of Methylobacterium organophilum, Org. Biomol. Chem. 13, 3393-3405 (2015).
- A. Bodlenner, W. Liu, G. Hirsch, P. Schaeffer, M. Blumenberg, R. Lendt, D. Tritsch, W. Michaelis & M. Rohmer, C_{35} hopanoid side chain biosynthesis: reduction of ribosylhopane into bacteriohopanetetrol by a cell-free system from Methylobacterium organophilum, ChemBioChem 16, 1764-1770 (2015).
