= Magda Ericson =

French-Tunisian physicist

Magda Galula Ericson
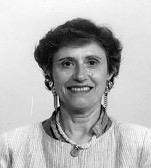
- Portrait of Magda Ericson, CERN, Department of Theoretical Physics
- Born: December 18, 1929 (age 96); Tunis, Tunisia
- Education: Sorbonne
- Known for: Ericson-Ericson Lorentz-Lorenz correction
- Spouse: Torleif Ericson
- Awards: Palmes Académiques 1978; Gay-Lussac-Humboldt-Prize 1992; Knight of the Legion of Honour 2015; Fulbright scholarship 1960
- Scientific career
- Fields: Condensed matter physics Particle physics Nuclear physics
- Workplaces: Massachusetts Institute of Technology (MIT); Centre national de la recherche scientifique (CNRS); University of Lyon; European Organization for Nuclear Research (CERN)
- Thesis: Étude des fluctuations d'aimantation dans le fer au voisinage de la température de Curie par diffusion des neutrons

Magda Galula Ericson (born 1929) is a French-Algerian physicist of Tunisian origin. Her experimental pioneering PhD work changed the understanding of critical phenomena near the Curie point and later in her career she has become known for her theoretical development of the Ericson-Ericson Lorentz-Lorenz correction.

== Contributions ==
Magda Ericson's thesis on the temperature dependence of slow neutron scattering on iron is an important pioneering experimental study of critical phenomena near the Curie point. Ericson is also known for her theoretical contributions to nuclear pion physics, which is a subfield of nuclear physics. She and her husband, Torleif Ericson, discovered the Ericson-Ericson Lorentz-Lorenz (EELL) effect of the pion-nuclear optical model, which has implications for electromagnetic and weak interactions in nuclei. She is also one of the leading researchers on the interpretation of the EMC effect. Magda Ericson's contributions are largely responsible for the development of nuclear pion physics as a subfield of nuclear physics and a large number of papers are based on her work. Ericson continues her research to this day.

== Education and early career ==
Although born in Tunisia, she graduated in 1947 from high-school in Algiers, at that time part of France. Following this she attended preparatory scientific university level classes at Lycée Bugeaud, later called Lycée Émir-Abdelkader, from 1947 to 1949. Placed first in a national entrance competition, she entered the École normale supérieure de Sèvres in Paris. In 1953 she placed first in the French national competition for physical sciences (Les agrégés de l'enseignement secondaire).

From 1953 to 1959 she was research associate (attachée de recherche) of the French National Centre for Scientific Research (CNRS) at the Saclay center of the Commissariat à l'Énergie Atomique, working mainly on slow neutron scattering and magnetism. She also prepared her PhD thesis in experimental physics, which she defended at Sorbonne University in 1958. As stated by J. Friedel "The agreement (of the van Hove model) with Ericson's measurements was good enough for them (the later Nobelprize winner de Gennes and Ericson) both to present their theses in quick succession". Ericson's pioneering results demonstrate the power of slow neutron scattering for investigating condensed matter.

In spite of these achievements, her temporary position with CNRS was not renewed in 1959. For health reasons she abandoned experiments in favor of theoretical research, first in plasma physics. She received a Fulbright scholarship and spent one year at MIT as a postdoctoral researcher in the plasma physics group of Sanborn C. Brown. During this period she found the explanation of an unexpectedly observed plasma constriction.

== Career and later research ==
After her return to France, she obtained a position as a lecturer at the University of Lyon. In 1967 she was promoted to professor in the same place, a position she kept until her formal retirement in 1995. She continues her research, and publishes actively, to this day (2022), as professor emeritus. Concurrently, her research is pursued at CERN as part-time unpaid visiting scientific associate—a status she has held since 1963.

Back in Europe, she abandoned a career in experimental physics turning to theoretical physics in the just emerging sub-field in the intersection of nuclear and particle physics, in particular concerning the role of the pion in a nuclear context. This was a fortunate decision since it turned out later that her new field of pion-nuclear physics has various useful analogies to her previous field in condensed matter. A major example is the Ericson-Ericson Lorentz-Lorenz effect for low energy pions, which she examined in detail with Torleif Ericson in a basic paper in 1966, an article that over time has been widely cited. Following the developments of pion low energy theorems, and PCAC in elementary particle physics, she applied in 1969 these techniques to the pion-nucleus threshold interactions, where the finite size of the nucleus presented a conceptual hurdle. This made her study this phenomenon in a wider perspective. She found that the low energy pion-nuclear equations have a nearly exact counterpart in Maxwell equations for a polarized medium. This leads in particular to an understanding of how a basic property of the free neutron beta decay is modified in the nuclear environment by a pion effect, and the explanation of the characteristic quenching effects observed in the low-energy Gamow–Teller transitions.

Ericson drew, in the early eighties, attention to the role of pionic physics as one of the origins of the EMC effect.

More recently her research concerns neutrino-nuclear interactions at higher energy, the understanding of which is essential for particle physics research. She has given the explanation of the so-called 'axial anomaly'.

Ericson's active career spans over seven decades.

== Private life ==
She is married, since 1957, to Torleif Ericson, a Swedish nuclear physicist who is active at CERN since 1960. Together they have two adult children. The Ericsons reside in Geneva, Switzerland.

Ericson is the aunt of the French mathematician Jean-Michel Bismut. Her cousin David Galula was a prominent military theorist.

== Awards and honors ==
- Knight of the Legion of Honour (2015)
- Gay-Lussac-Humboldt-Prize (1992)
- Prix Paul Marguerite de la Charlonie, prize by Académie des sciences française (1987)
- Knight of the Palmes Académiques (1978)
- Fulbright scholarship (1960)
