= Ericson fluctuations =

Ericson fluctuations constitute one of the most characteristic features of quantum chaotic scattering in the regime of strongly overlapping resonances such as a compound nucleus. These fluctuations were predicted in 1960 by Torleif Ericson in two seminal articles, further developed in 1963, based on the same statistical assumptions as those used by E. Wigner, C. E. Porter and R. G. Thomas to describe generic properties of resonances in long-lived compound nuclear systems. In the present case the fluctuations occur in the "continuum" regime for which a large number of such resonances overlap coherently, owing to the short lifetime of the compound nucleus. At the time it was believed that this would lead to a structure-less behavior. Ericson realized that the opposite was the case with strong, random fluctuations.

The Ericson fluctuations were first observed in 1964 by P. Von Brentano et al. in nuclear physics giving rise to a vigorous theoretical and experimental programme. They have the curious feature of being both reproducible and random at the same time. The fluctuations are universal and have later been observed in many other areas such as photoionization of hydrogen, uni-molecular dissociation (physical chemistry), perturbed atomic and molecular systems and micro wave billiards.

Present theoretical descriptions of chaotic quantum scattering confirm the predicted properties of the Ericson fluctuations. The universality of the Ericson fluctuations are thus very well established.
