= Holger Martin =

German University lecturer for process engineering (1942–2016)

Holger Martin (December 3, 1942 in Achern - November 5, 2016 in Karlsruhe) was a German University lecturer for process engineering.

== Academic career ==
Holger Martin graduated from the University of Karlsruhe in 1969. In 1973, he graduated from the University of Karlsruhe, where he worked as a professor at the Institute for Thermal Process Engineering until 2008

== Scientific activity ==
Holger Martin taught drying techniques, heat transfer, heat transfer I and II (mathematical methods of heat transfer) and transport phenomena in beds and fluidized beds at the Chemistry Engineering and Process Engineering faculty of the university Karlsruhe (TH) from 1977 to 2008.

Other areas of activity:

- Lectures on thermal process engineering for biotechnologists at the École supérieure de biotechnologie Strasbourg 1990 to 1996.
- Scientific director of the International Seminar for Research and Teaching in Chemical Engineering and Physical Chemistry at the University of Karlsruhe (TH) from 1980 to 2004.
- Visiting scientists at the National Laboratory of the Sciences of the Sciences Chimiques (LSGC) of the CNRS in Nancy, France (6 months) 1984/1985.
- Guest professor at the Indian Institute of Technology, Madras, with two lectures also at the Indian Institute of Science, Bangalore, India February–March 1989.
- Chairman of the Editorial Committee of the VDI - Heat Atlas from 1997 to 2006.
- Chairman of the VDI-GVC Committee for Heat and Mass Transfer 2000 to 2006.
- Staff and Workshop Editor at The Omnificent English Dictionary in Limerick Form under the pseudonym PGS. First post in February 2005. Last post on 16 July 2016.
- Staff at Baumkunde.de under the pseudonym PGS. First post on 16/11/2012. 3436 posts. Last post in September 2016.

== Awards ==
- Arnold Eucken Prize, Strasbourg, 1980, from the VDI-GVC.
- French-German Alexander-von-Humboldt Prize (from 1997 Gay-Lussac-Humboldt Prize), Paris, 1984.

== Fonts ==
- Heat exchanger. Georg Thieme Verlag, Stuttgart, New York, 1988.
- Heat Exchangers. Hemisphere Publ. Co. Washington DC, 1992.
- Holger Martin with E. U. Schlünder: Introduction to heat transfer. 8. New edition. In addition,
- Publications in trade journals such as Archive of Applied Mechanics, Chemical Engineering & Processing, Chemical Engineering & Technology, Chemical Engineering & Technology, Heat Transfer Engineering, International Journal of Heat & Mass Transfer , etc.
- * * * Heat Exchanger Design Handbook (HEDH), "Heat Exchanger Design Handbook (HEDH)", "Heat Exchanger Design Handbook (HEDH)", 3.2 Heat Transfer in Fluid Process Engineering, Ralf Goedecke, Editor, Wiley-VCH, 2006, Green in Karlsruhe, Special Trees and Shrubs, BüGa e. V. Ed. Info-Verlag, 2015.
