= Ericson–Ericson Lorentz–Lorenz correction =

Scattering theory

Ericson–Ericson Lorentz–Lorenz correction, also called the Ericson–Ericson Lorentz–Lorenz effect (EELL), refers to an analogy in the interface between nuclear, atomic and particle physics, which in its simplest form corresponds to the well known Lorentz–Lorenz equation (also referred to as the Clausius–Mossotti relation) for electromagnetic waves and light in a refractive medium.

These relations link the macroscopic quantities such as the refractive index to the dipole polarization of the individual atoms or molecules. When the latter are kept apart the polarizing field is no longer the average electric field in the medium. Similarly for the pion, the lightest meson and the carrier of the long range part of the nuclear force, its typical non-relativistic scattering for individual nucleons has a dominant dipole structure with a known average dipole polarizability of strength ("the average scattering volume").

The physics becomes closely similar although the nuclear density is about 15 orders of magnitude larger than that of ordinary matter and the nature of the dipole interaction is totally different.

The correction was predicted in 1963 by Magda Ericson and was derived in 1966 together with Torleif Ericson. The effect has since been re-derived in various ways, but is now understood as a general effect as long as the nucleons keep their individuality, independent of the detailed cause. This is the reason why in the molecular case of the classical Lorentz–Lorenz effect so many incompatible derivations give the same result. The EELL correction was first applied to the line shifts of hydrogen-like atoms, where the electron in the Coulomb field is replaced by a negatively charged pion. Its interaction with the central nucleus causes deviations in the line positions in such Bohr-like atoms.

The effect has greatly influenced the understanding of the pion-nucleus many-body problem by realizing that the scattering of a pion from a nucleon in nuclear matter is determined by the local pion field at the nucleon.

The effect has also found applications in other contexts of pionic phenomena in nuclei such as the modification of the axial coupling constant in beta-decay, pion scattering, axial locality, pion condensation in nuclear matter, structure of the nuclear pion field, etc.
