= Achim Richter =

German nuclear physicist

Achim Richter (born 21 September 1940 in Dresden) is a German nuclear physicist. He became a professor at the Institute of Nuclear Physics at the Darmstadt University of Technology in 1974 and retired in September 2008. From 1 November 2008 to 31 October 2012 he was director of the European Centre for Theoretical Studies in Nuclear Physics and Related Areas (ECT*) in Trento, Italy. Since 1 November 2012, he has been professor again at the Institute for Nuclear Physics of TU Darmstadt.

== Biography ==
Richter was born to builder Georg Edmund Richter and his wife Elsa (née Wenzel). He attended primary and secondary school in Dresden, graduating as dux of the school in 1958, with a university diploma. After his application to study physics at the technical university in Dresden, he was rejected five times on political and ideological grounds, he escaped from East Germany in 1959, via West Berlin.

In 1959 he started studying physics at the University of Heidelberg, and was accepted as a member of the Studienstiftung des deutschen Volkes (Study Foundation of German People) in 1963, two years later he graduated with a degree in physics. In 1967 he was awarded a doctorate by professor Wolfgang Gentner at the Max-Planck-Institute of Nuclear Physics in Heidelberg. From 1967 to 1968 he worked as a research associate in the physics department at Florida State University in Tallahassee, Florida. From 1969 to 1970 he worked as a postdoctoral colleague in the physics department of the Argonne National Laboratory in Illinois.

In 1971 Richter became a research associate at the Max-Planck-Institut of nuclear physics. After completing his postdoctoral qualification in physics at the University of Heidelberg he became an associate professor there. From 1971 to 1973 Richter was a scientific advisor and professor at the Ruhr University Bochum. In 1974 he became director of the institute of nuclear physics of the Darmstadt University of Technology.

Richter is a member of the Deutsche Physikalische Gesellschaft (German Physical Society) and of the Deutschen Hochschulverband (German Association of University Professors). At the end of 2005, the American Physical Society elected him as the first non-American to be senior editor of the Reviews of Modern Physics.

Richter has played the viola from childhood. He is married to Christine Monika.

== Works ==
Richter and his staff members achieved significant research results with the development of the superconducting electron accelerators in Darmstadt S-DALINAC, which was the first accelerator of this kind in Europe, and furthermore the design and setup of the first free electron Laser (FEL) in Germany.

He is regarded as the discoverer of the scissors mode in heavy deformed atomic nuclei in 1984. His scientific working fields cover a broad spectra in the areas of nuclear physics, atomic physics, radiation physics, acceleration physics and nonlinear dynamic systems. There are researches about symmetries and conservation laws in light nuclei and phenomena of fluctuations in nuclear reactions, experiments for the electromagnetic suspenses of nuclei with photons, electrons and hadrons as well as works on the area of channeling radiation, non-linear dynamics and quantum chaos.

== Honors ==
Richter won numerous honors and recognitions:

- 1964: Winner of the University Award for Physics
- 1988: Gay-Lussac Humboldt Prize
- 1990: Correspondent of the Royal Society of South Africa
- 1992: Winner of the Max Planck Research Award
- 1995: Honorary doctorate of Chalmers University of Technology in Gothenburg, Sweden
- 1996: Honorary doctorate of Ghent University, Belgium
- 1996: Correspondent of the Heidelberger Academy of Sciences
- 2000: Honorary doctorate of University of the Witwatersrand, Johannesburg, South Africa
- 2000: Honorary doctorate of Kharkov National University, Ukraine
- 2001: Winner of the Stern-Gerlach Medal of German Physical Society
- 2002: Fellow of the American Physical Society
- 2005: Correspondent of the Royal Society of Arts and Sciences in Gothenburg, Sweden
- 2006: Gained Tage Erlander Professorship of the Swedish Research Councils
- 2007: Gained an Order of Merit of the State of Hessen
- 2010: Member of the Royal Physiographic Society in Lund, Sweden
- 2010: Member of the German National Academy of Sciences Leopoldina
