= Schmale Gera =

River in Germany

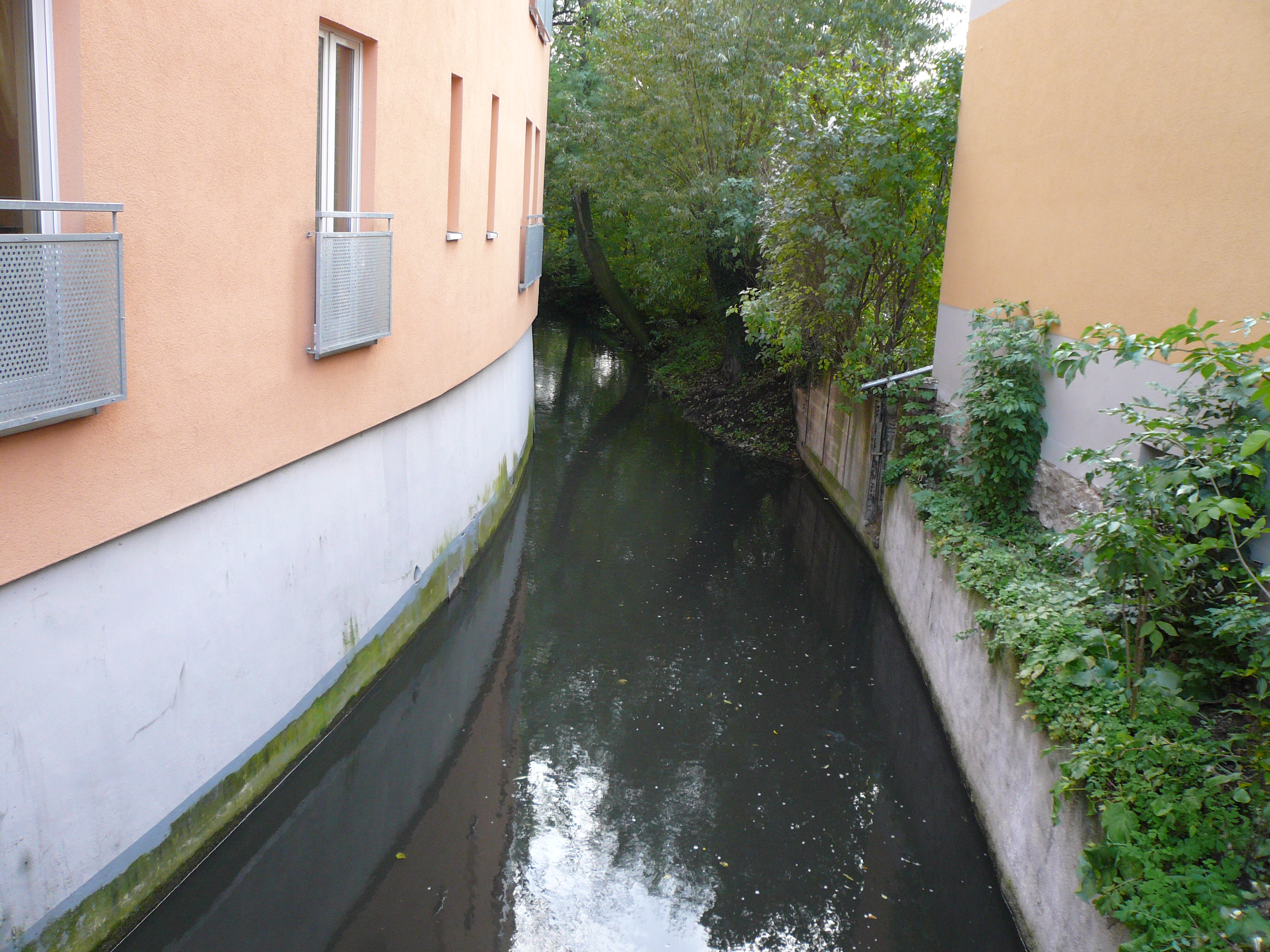

Location
- Country: Germany
- States: Thuringia

Physical characteristics
- Mouth
  - location: Gramme
  - coordinates: 51.1489°N 11.0039°E

Basin features
- Progression: Gramme→ Unstrut→ Saale→ Elbe→ North Sea

Schmale Gera is a river of Thuringia, Germany. It is a distributary of the Gera in Erfurt. It flows into the Gramme near Werningshausen.

The Narrow Gera is a long tributary of the Gera River, which begins in the center of the Thuringian capital Erfurt and runs parallel to its main course in the flat center of the Thuringian Basin until shortly before the district town of Sömmerda .

== Course ==
The Schmale Gera branches off to the right in the Venice Park in the old town of Erfurt from the Wilder Gera, at the end of the section called Breitstrom . Shortly afterwards, the narrow Gera crosses under the main river of the Gera, known as the flood ditch, in a culvert .

Culvert of the Schmalen Gera (back) under the flood ditch (front) from 1895 in Erfurt

The water crosses the Johannesviertel in Erfurt's old town and the Mühlenviertel in the Andreasvorstadt . In Ilversgehofen it drives the Heiligenmühle at Mittelhäuser Strasse 16. It then flows through the Rieth and then between Gispersleben and the Red Mountain to Mittelhausen .

Outside the urban area, it flows between Nöda and Riethnordhausen close to the foot of the hills. At Haßleben, its course is separated from that of the main Gera river by the Kantorberg and another hill.

The narrow Gera drives the Cux mill south of Werningshausen . On the outskirts it takes up the Wilder Graben, which previously flows parallel to the Gramme, but does not branch off from it. On the western edge of Werningshausen there is a connecting ditch between Schmaler Gera and Gramme at Lindenstrasse, but only 0.6 km north of the village the two bodies of water unite, whereby the Gramme, which was previously close to the edge of the village, is in the bed of the previously in a wide arc around the village Schmalen Gera, which is led around, continues to flow.

From the confluence it is another 1.57 km to the confluence of the Gramme in the Unstrut . This means that the separate Schmalen Gera run is over 25 km long.

== Individual evidence ==
- http://www.geoportal-th.de/
- http://www.gpsies.com/map.do?fileId=lcqihkqdqbksyfhq
