= Julia Schmale =

German atmospheric chemist

Professor Julia Yvonne Schmale
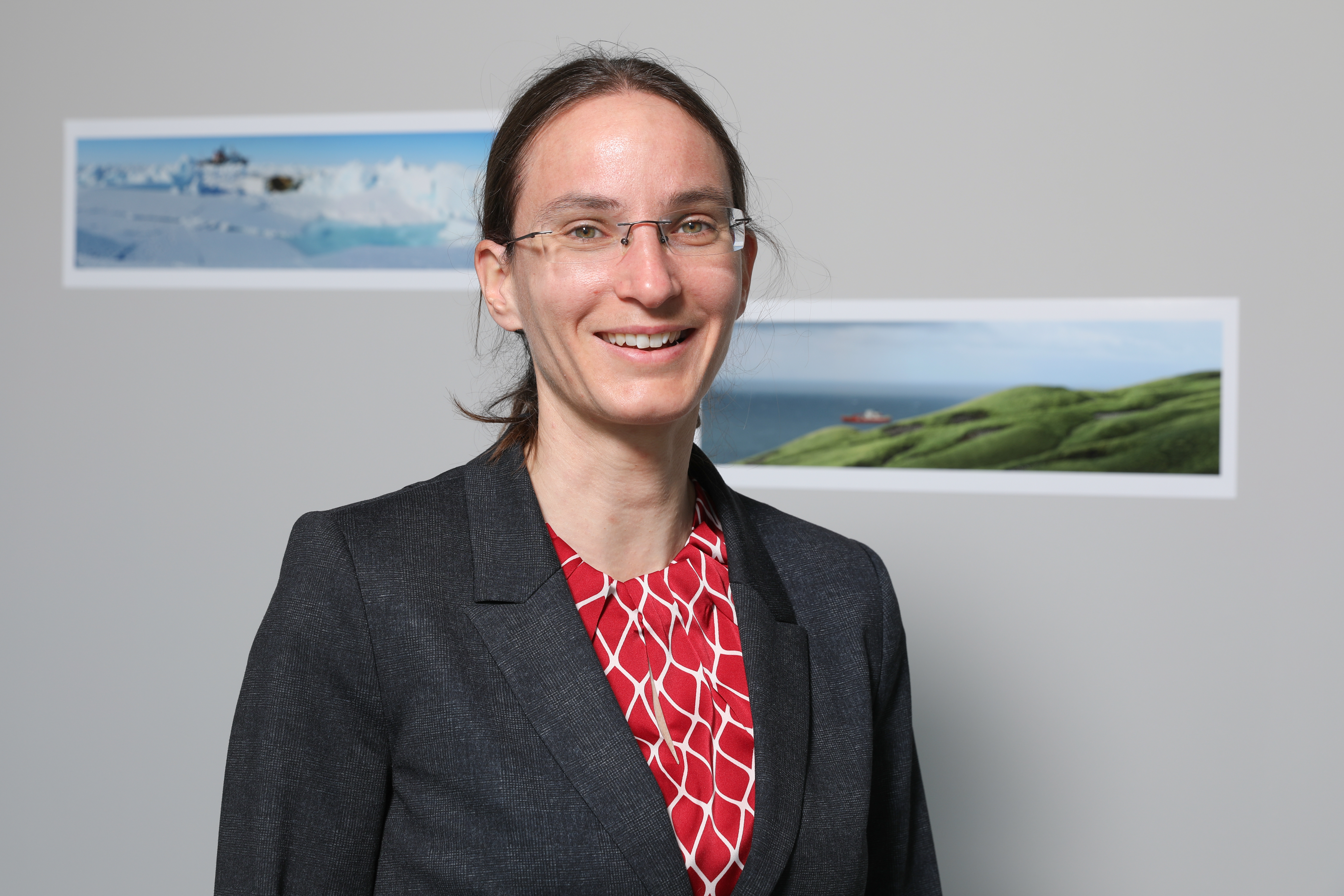
- Julia Schmale in 2021
- Citizenship: Germany
- Known for: Aerosol process studies with a focus on polar regions and high altitudes

Academic background
- Education: Environmental engineering
- Alma mater: University of Leoben; University of Mainz
- Doctoral advisor: Stephan Borrmann; Johannes Schneider
- Other advisors: Mark Lawrence; Martin Gysel-Beer; Urs Baltensperger

Academic work
- Discipline: Atmospheric chemistry
- Institutions: EPFL (École Polytechnique Fédérale de Lausanne)
- Main interests: Aerosol; Short-lived climate forcers Arctic; Antarctic; Southern Ocean; Science policy
- Website: https://www.epfl.ch/labs/eerl/

Julia Yvonne Schmale is a German environmental scientist. She is a specialist in the micro-physical makeup of the atmosphere, in particular aerosols and their interaction with clouds. She is a professor at EPFL (École Polytechnique Fédérale de Lausanne) and the head of the Extreme Environments Research Laboratory (EERL). She is a participant in the Multidisciplinary drifting Observatory for the Study of Arctic Climate (MOSAiC) expeditions.

== Career ==
Schmale studied environmental engineering at the University of Leoben, and received her master's degree in 2007 with a thesis on contaminated site remediation. She then joined Stephan Borrmann and Johannes Schneider at the Max Planck Institute for Chemistry and the University of Mainz as a PhD student to work on in situ and online aerosol mass spectrometry with a focus on remote regions such as the Arctic, Subantarctic, and upper troposphere and lower stratosphere. She graduated in 2011 (with a dissertation on "Aircraft-based in-situ aerosol mass spectrometry: Chemical characterization and source identification of submicron particulate matter in the free and upper troposphere and lower stratosphere." In 2012, she joined the Institute for Advanced Sustainability Studies's director Mark Lawrence in Potsdam, Germany, as a postdoctoral research fellow to research policies for air pollution and climate change from local to global level, and solutions for sustainability issues. There she initiated and headed the ClimPol team, which focused on the science-policy interface to develop solutions involving both stakeholders and policy makers in a transdisciplinary approach, and to facilitate the transfer of scientific knowledge to practitioners. In 2014, she started to work as a postdoctoral fellow with Martin Gysel-Beer and Urs Baltensperger at the Laboratory of Atmospheric Chemistry at the Paul Scherrer Institute. Her research targeted aerosol-cloud interactions, aerosols in polar regions, black carbon and snow. She intensified her engagement in aerosol processes research in polar regions and participated as principal investigator on the Antarctic circumnavigation expedition, became the co-instigator of the ACE-DATA project with the Swiss Data Science Center, and participated in the Arctic Ocean 2018 Expedition. In 2018, she was made the head of the Molecular Clusters and Particle Processes Group at the Laboratory of Atmospheric Chemistry (MOSAiC) at the Paul Scherrer Institute where she continued her investigation into aerosol processes in extreme environments.

Since 2019, she has been a Tenure Track Assistant Professor at the Institute of Environmental Engineering at EPFL, and the head of the Extreme Environments Research Laboratory at EPFL's School of Architecture, Civil and Environmental Engineering at the Valais-Wallis Campus.

== Research ==
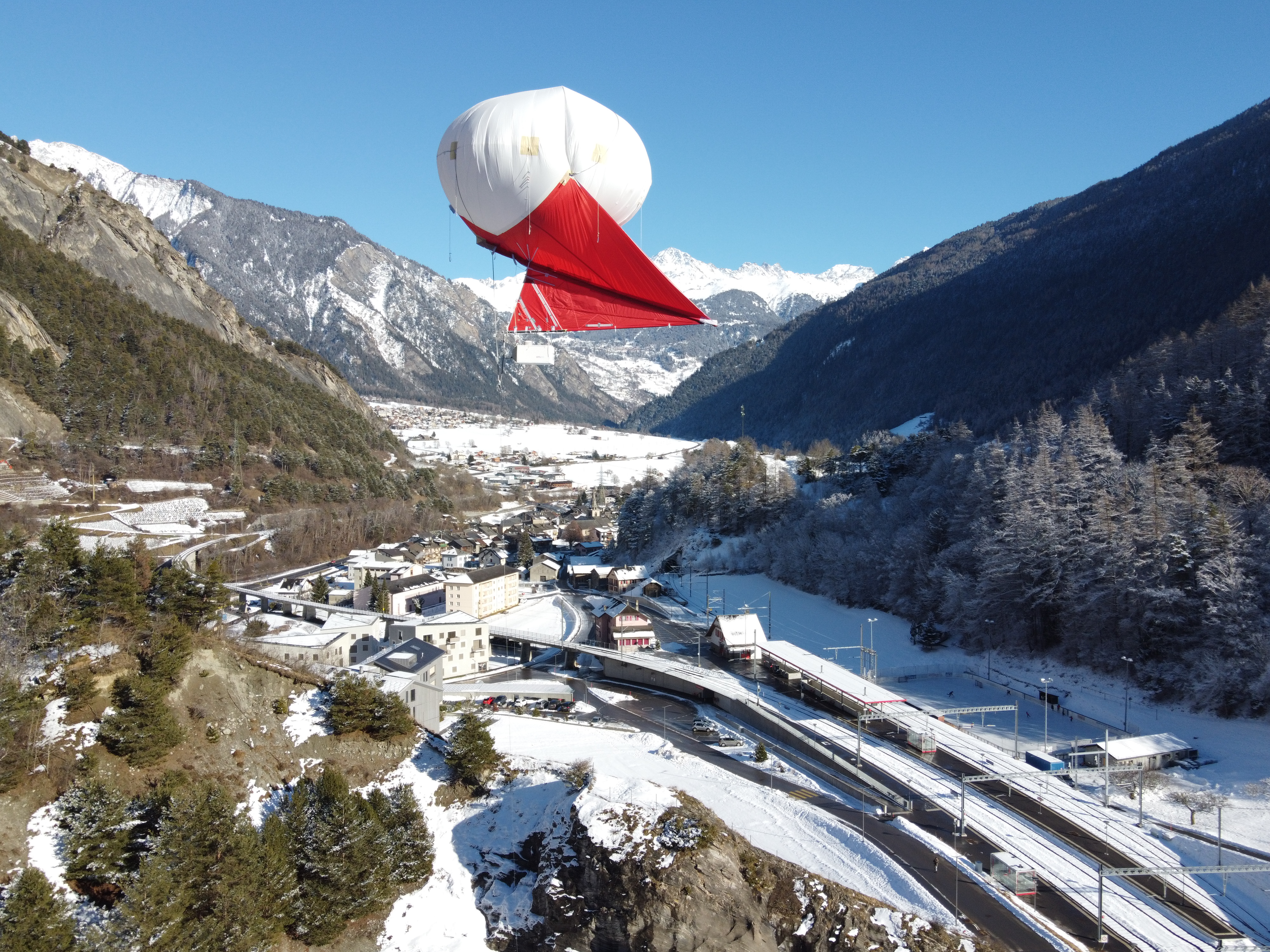
Measurements of vertical aerosol dispersion in Switzerland with a helikite (credit: Julia Schmale)

Schmale's research focuses on environmental processes that impact the chemical and micro-physical makeup of the atmosphere, in particular aerosols that can interact with clouds and thereby may influence Earth's energy balance. Her research aims at distinguishing natural processes from anthropologically influenced processes such as air pollution. She is interested in extreme environments and conducts her research mainly in polar, and high altitude regions. She investigates how oceans, land masses, cryospheres and biospheres interact with the atmosphere, and which influence this interaction might have on radiative forcing. To achieve her measurements, she uses a variety of platforms such as ships, aircraft, tethered balloons, and surface observatories.

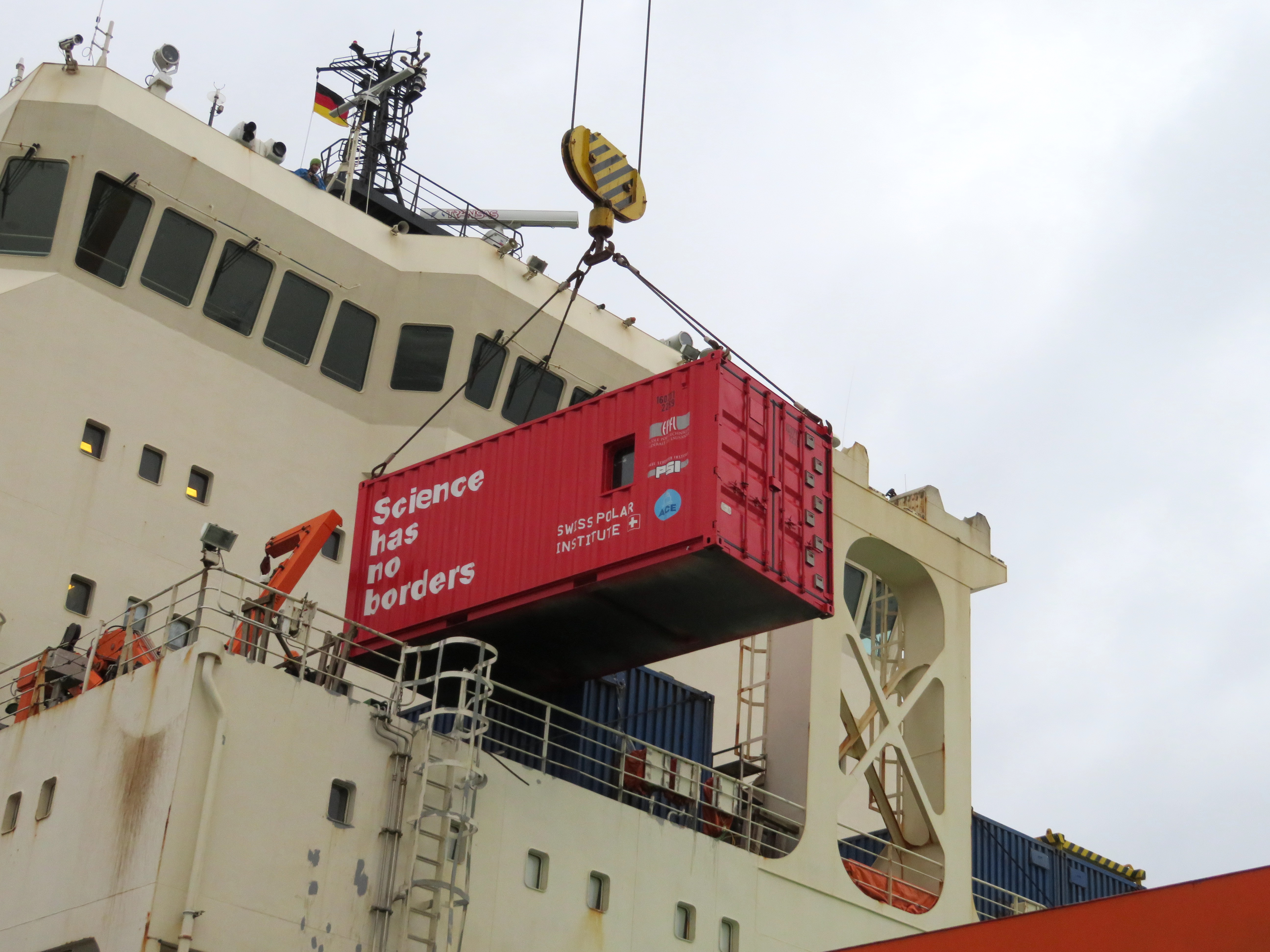
Sea going atmospheric measurement container, which participated in the Antarctic Circumnavigation Expedition, the Arctic Ocean 2018 Expedition and MOSAiC (credit: Julia Schmale)

Her current research is on the Southern Ocean, coastal Antarctica and the central Arctic Ocean. She is principal investigator of MOSAiC, where she conducts the "measurement-based understanding of the aerosol budget in the arctic and its climate effects" (MBRACE) project to elucidate the aerosol-cloud interactions for 13 months over the Arctic sea ice.

Schmale is one of the lead authors of the 2015 Arctic Monitoring and Assessment Programme assessment on "black carbon and ozone as Arctic climate forcers."

=== Press ===
Her research has been featured on news outlets such as the Swiss television SRF, in several documentaries, and she regularly gives public talks or radio interviews: Futurium Berlin, talk with Julia Schmale and Matthew Shupe on MOSAiC; interview homecoming of MOSAiC expedition on SRF's "10 vor 10"; talk on carnotzet scientifique online; RTS's interview titled "Prisonnier des glaces de l'Arctique pour édutier le climat;" in Le Nouvelliste on "De Sion à l'Arctique pour étudier le climat;" RTS interview in Dessine-moi un nuage, Episode 3; SRF Einstein documentary on "In 88 Tagen um den Südpol;" TV5 Monde's Thalassa on "Coup de chaud sur l'Antarctique!;" and the 2016 to 2017 diary in the Aargauer Zeitung named "Tagebuch aus der Antarktis."

== Distinctions ==
Schmale is a member of the expert group on short-lived climate forcers with the Arctic Monitoring and Assessment Programme and one of the lead authors of assessment reports, the Atmosphere Working Group of the International Arctic Science Committee representing Switzerland, the Swiss Committee on Polar and High Altitude Research, the Committee of the international initiative "Arctic air Pollution: Climate, Environment and Society" (PACES), and the Working Group on Atmospheric Aerosol Studies of the European Aerosol Association.

== Selected works ==
- Schmale, Julia; Baccarini, Andrea; Thurnherr, Iris; Henning, Silvia; Efraim, Avichay; Regayre, Leighton; Bolas, Conor; Hartmann, Markus; Welti, André; Lehtipalo, Katrianne; Aemisegger, Franziska; Tatzelt, Christian; Landwehr, Sebastian; Modini, Robin L.; Tummon, Fiona; Johnson, Jill S.; Harris, Neil; Schnaiter, Martin; Toffoli, Alessandro; Derkani, Marzieh; Bukowiecki, Nicolas; Stratmann, Frank; Dommen, Josef; Baltensperger, Urs; Wernli, Heini; Rosenfeld, Daniel; Gysel-Beer, Martin; Carslaw, Ken S. (2019). "Overview of the Antarctic Circumnavigation Expedition: Study of Preindustrial-like Aerosols and Their Climate Effects (ACE-SPACE)". Bulletin of the American Meteorological Society. 100 (11): 2260–2283. Bibcode:2019BAMS..100.2260S. doi:10.1175/BAMS-D-18-0187.1. hdl:11343/233685. S2CID 198448729.
- Baccarini, Andrea; Karlsson, Linn; Dommen, Josef; Duplessis, Patrick; Vüllers, Jutta; Brooks, Ian M.; Saiz-Lopez, Alfonso; Salter, Matthew; Tjernström, Michael; Baltensperger, Urs; Zieger, Paul; Schmale, Julia (2020). "Frequent new particle formation over the high Arctic pack ice by enhanced iodine emissions". Nature Communications. 11 (1): 4924. Bibcode:2020NatCo..11.4924B. doi:10.1038/s41467-020-18551-0. PMC 7529815. PMID 33004812.
- Schmale, J.; Arnold, S. R.; Law, K. S.; Thorp, T.; Anenberg, S.; Simpson, W. R.; Mao, J.; Pratt, K. A. (2018). "Local Arctic Air Pollution: A Neglected but Serious Problem". Earth's Future. 6 (10): 1385–1412. Bibcode:2018EaFut...6.1385S. doi:10.1029/2018EF000952. hdl:2027.42/146562.
- Schmale, Julia; Henning, Silvia; Decesari, Stefano; Henzing, Bas; Keskinen, Helmi; Sellegri, Karine; Ovadnevaite, Jurgita; Pöhlker, Mira L.; Brito, Joel; Bougiatioti, Aikaterini; Kristensson, Adam; Kalivitis, Nikos; Stavroulas, Iasonas; Carbone, Samara; Jefferson, Anne; Park, Minsu; Schlag, Patrick; Iwamoto, Yoko; Aalto, Pasi; Äijälä, Mikko; Bukowiecki, Nicolas; Ehn, Mikael; Frank, Göran; Fröhlich, Roman; Frumau, Arnoud; Herrmann, Erik; Herrmann, Hartmut; Holzinger, Rupert; Kos, Gerard; et al. (2018). "Long-term cloud condensation nuclei number concentration, particle number size distribution and chemical composition measurements at regionally representative observatories". Atmospheric Chemistry and Physics. 18 (4): 2853–2881. Bibcode:2018ACP....18.2853S. doi:10.5194/acp-18-2853-2018. hdl:21.11116/0000-0000-C19B-7.
- Schmale, Julia; Flanner, Mark; Kang, Shichang; Sprenger, Michael; Zhang, Qianggong; Guo, Junming; Li, Yang; Schwikowski, Margit; Farinotti, Daniel (2017). "Modulation of snow reflectance and snowmelt from Central Asian glaciers by anthropogenic black carbon". Scientific Reports. 7 40501. Bibcode:2017NatSR...740501S. doi:10.1038/srep40501. PMC 5228185. PMID 28079148.
- Schmale, Julia; Shindell, Drew; von Schneidemesser, Erika; Chabay, Ilan; Lawrence, Mark (2014). "Air pollution: Clean up our skies". Nature. 515 (7527): 335–337. Bibcode:2014Natur.515..335S. doi:10.1038/515335a. PMID 25409811. S2CID 4468441.
- Schmale, J.; Schneider, J.; Nemitz, E.; Tang, Y. S.; Dragosits, U.; Blackall, T. D.; Trathan, P. N.; Phillips, G. J.; Sutton, M.; Braban, C. F. (2013). "Sub-Antarctic marine aerosol: Dominant contributions from biogenic sources". Atmospheric Chemistry and Physics. 13 (17): 8669–8694. Bibcode:2013ACP....13.8669S. doi:10.5194/acp-13-8669-2013.
- Schmale, J.; Schneider, J.; Ancellet, G.; Quennehen, B.; Stohl, A.; Sodemann, H.; Burkhart, J. F.; Hamburger, T.; Arnold, S. R.; Schwarzenboeck, A.; Borrmann, S.; Law, K. S. (2011). "Source identification and airborne chemical characterisation of aerosol pollution from long-range transport over Greenland during POLARCAT summer campaign 2008". Atmospheric Chemistry and Physics. 11 (19): 10097–10123. Bibcode:2011ACP....1110097S. doi:10.5194/acp-11-10097-2011. hdl:20.500.11850/160997.
