= Adnan Ibrahimbegovic =

Bosnian engineer

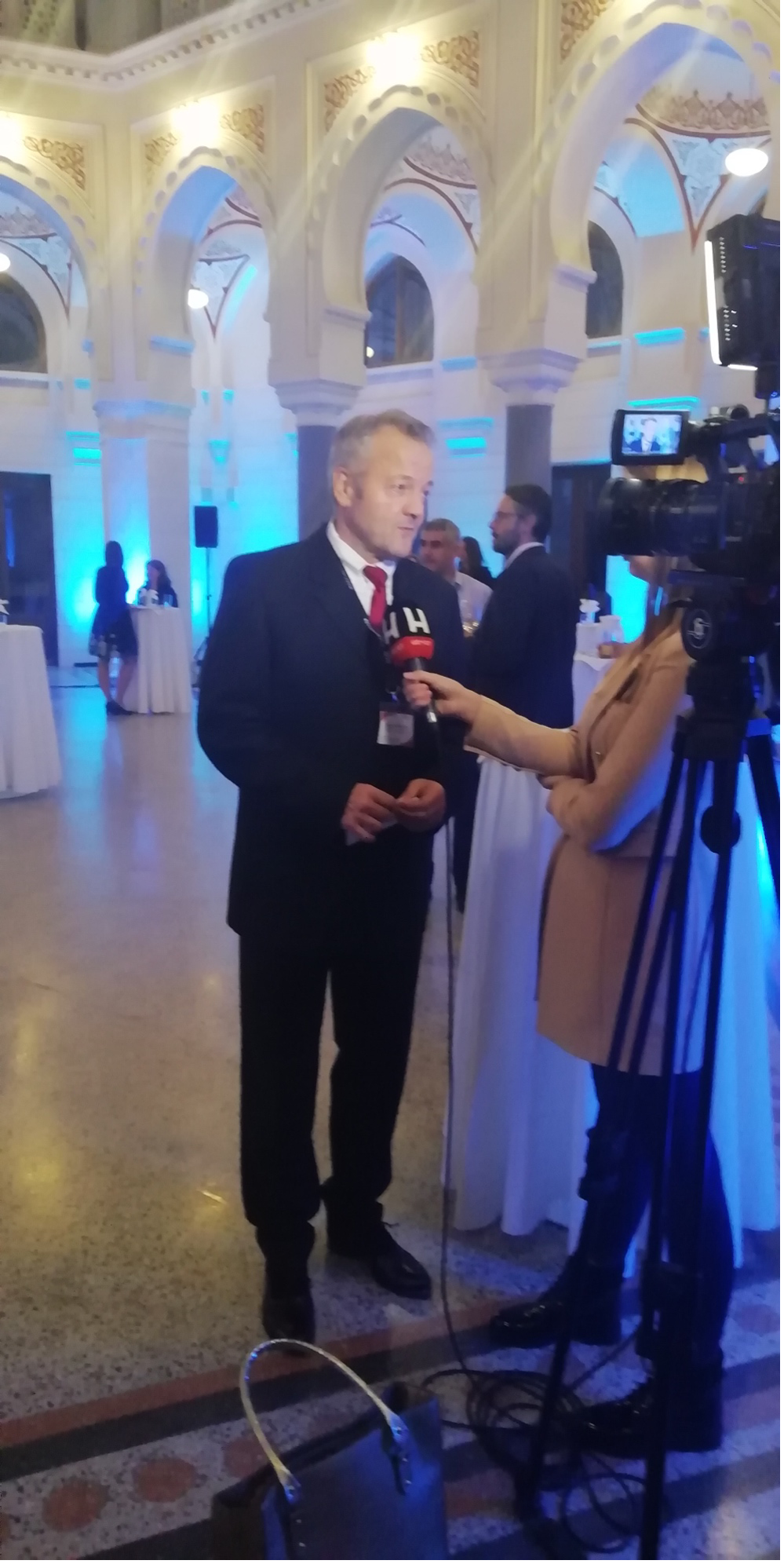
- Education: University of California, Berkeley; Pierre and Marie Curie University
- Scientific career
- Fields: Computer Science
- Workplaces: University of Technology of Compiègne
- Website: ibrahimb.pers.utc.fr

Adnan Ibrahimbegovic is a professor of computational mechanics and a senior member of the Institut Universitaire de France (IUF). He holds the position of Professeur Classe Exceptionnelle and serves as the chair for Computational Mechanics at the University of Technology of Compiègne (UTC), a founding member of Sorbonne Universités.

== Career ==
Ibrahimbegovic has held academic and research positions at institutions across several countries. He began his career as a lecturer at the University of Sarajevo before pursuing doctoral and postdoctoral research at the University of California, Berkeley. He later held positions at the University of Sarajevo and the École Polytechnique Fédérale de Lausanne before joining the University of Technology of Compiègne in France. He was a professor at École Normale Supérieure de Cachan, where he was named a Distinguished Professor in 2009. Since 2014, he has led the chair for Computational Mechanics at the University of Technology of Compiègne, Sorbonne Universités, and was a Senior Member of the Institut Universitaire de France from 2015 to 2025.

== Honors ==
- 2005 Humboldt Research Award
- ANUBH-Member of Academy of Sciences and Arts of Bosnia and Herzegovina in 2018
- IACM Fellow Award from International Association of Computational Mechanics in 2006
- Elected member of the Academia Europaea (2022)
- CEACM Prof. Mang Award from Central European Association for Computational Mechanics (2022)

== Books ==
- Trovalusci P., T. Sadowski, A. Ibrahimbegovic (eds.), ‘Multiscale and Multiphysics Modelling for Advanced and Sustainable Materials’, Springer, ISBN 978-3-031-84378-5, pp. 1–444, (2025)
- Ibrahimbegovic A., R.A. Mejia-Nava, ‘Structural Engineering: Models and Methods for Statics, Instability and Inelasticity’, Springer, ISBN 978-3-031-23591-7, pp. 1–532, (2023)
- Ibrahimbegovic A., N. Ademovic, ‘Nonlinear Dynamics of Structures Under Extreme Transient Loads’, CRC Press, ISBN 978-1138035416, pp. 1–253, (2019)
- Brancherie D., P. Feissel, S. Bouvier, A. Ibrahimbegovic (eds.), ‘From Microstructure Investigations to Multiscale Modeling’, ISTE Wiley, ISBN 978-1-786-30259-5, pp. 1–273, (2018)
- Ibrahimbegovic A. (ed.), ‘Computational Methods for Solids and Fluids: Multiscale Analysis, Probability Aspects and Model Reduction’, Springer, ISBN 978-3-319-27994-7, pp. 1–493, (2016)
- Ibrahimbegovic A., ‘Nonlinear solid mechanics: theoretical formulations and finite element solution methods’, Springer, Berlin, (ISBN 978-90-481-2330-8, E-book ISBN 978-1-4020-9793-5, pp. 1–571, (2009)
- Ibrahimbegovic A., M. Zlatar (eds.), ‘Damage assessment and reconstruction after war or natural disaster’, Springer, Berlin, (ISBN : HB 978-90-481-2385-8, PB 978-90-481-2384-1, E-book 978-90-481-2386-5), pp 1–405, (2009)
- Ibrahimbegovic A., I. Kozar (eds.), ‘Extreme man-made and natural hazards in dynamics of structures’, Springer, Berlin, (ISBN : HB 978-1-4020-5654-3, PB 978-1-4020-5655-0, E-book ISBN 978-1-4020-5656-7 pp 1–397 (2007)
- Ibrahimbegovic A., ‘Mécanique non linéaire des solides déformables : Formulation théorique et résolution numérique par éléments finis’, Hermes Science Publication – Lavoisier, Paris ISBN 2-7462-1489-X pp 1–604 (2006)
- Ibrahimbegovic A., B. Brank (eds.), Multi-physics and multi-scale computer models in nonlinear analysis and optimal design of engineering structures under extreme conditions, IOS Press, Amsterdam, ISBN 1-58803-479-0 pp 1–407 (2005)
