= Ernst Priesner =

Austrian biologist (1934–1994)

- Born: Ernst Priesner; 12 May 1934; Austria
- Disappeared: 19 July 1994 (aged 60)
- Status: Missing for 31 years, 9 months and 7 days

Ernst Priesner (12 May 1934 – disappeared 19 July 1994) was an Austrian biologist. He pioneered in the field of sex pheromones at the Max Planck Institute for Behavioral Physiology in Seewiesen. His entomological main emphasis was on the field of Hymenoptera and butterflies.

== Life ==
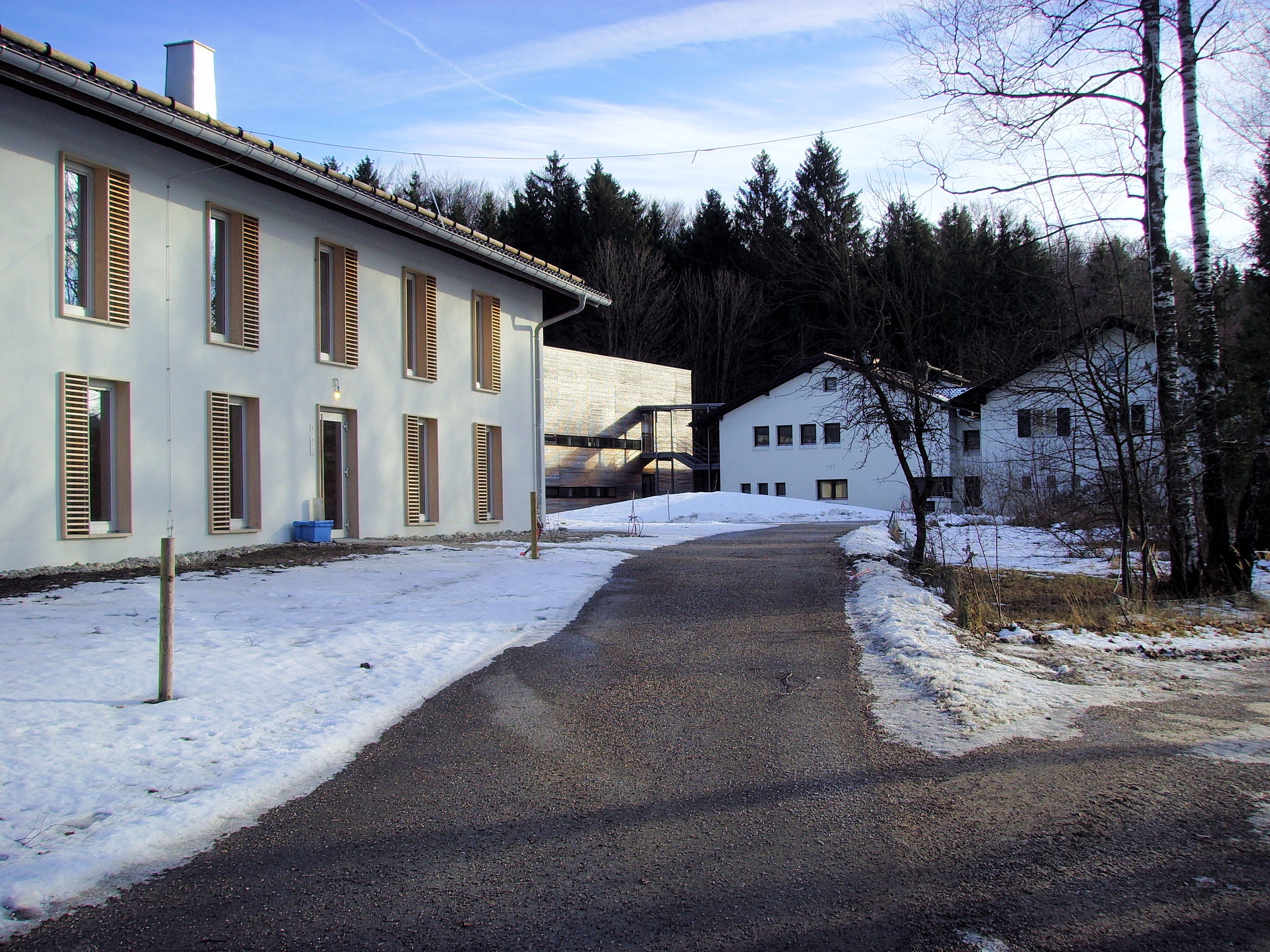
Max-Planck-Instituts for Behavioral Physiology in Seewiesen

Ernst Priesner attended the high school in Klagenfurt. Afterwards he studied biology at the University of Vienna where he worked on his thesis in the research group of Wilhelm Kühnelt at the Zoological Institute. In 1959 he received his Ph.D.

After his time in Vienna, Priesner worked first with the Zoological Institute of the University of Göttingen, before joining the work group of Dietrich Schneider at LMU Munich in 1963. Two years later, he followed Schneider to Seewiesen to the local Max Planck Institute. In 1974, Priesner lived at the University of Erlangen–Nuremberg, where he focused on the study of insect pheromones, particularly Sesiidae.

In 1983, Priesner received the Gay-Lussac-Humboldt-Prize for his work in the field of pheromone research. He was the driving force in the study of clearwings by means of attracting with synthetically produced pheromones. Several new species have been discovered with this method. Priesner developed a set of 21 pheromones which succeeds in attracting almost all types of wing borers.

Priesner disappeared in July 1994, when he did not return from checking insect traps in the mountains of Garmisch-Partenkirchen in the area of the Pflegersee. Various search operations by the mountain rescue were not successful.

== See also ==
- List of people who disappeared mysteriously (2000–present)

== Publications ==
- J. Boeckh, Ernst Priesner, D. Schneider, M. Jacobson: Olfactory Receptor Response to the Cockroach Sexual Attractant. In: Science. 141, 1963, S. 716–717, doi:10.1126/science.141.3582.716.
- Ernst Priesner: Die interspezifischen Wirkungen der Sexuallockstoffe der Saturniidae (Lepidoptera). In: Zeitschrift für vergleichende Physiologie. 61, 1968, S. 263–297, doi:10.1007/BF00428005.
- Karl-Ernst Kaissling, Ernst Priesner: Die Riechschwelle des Seidenspinners. In: Die Naturwissenschaften. 57, 1970, S. 23–28, doi:10.1007/BF00593550.
- Peter Witzgall, Ernst Priesner: Wind-tunnel study on attraction inhibitor in male Coleophora laricella Hbn. (Lepidoptera: Coleophoridae). In: Journal of Chemical Ecology. 17, 1991, S. 1355–1362, doi:10.1007/BF00983768.
