= Hartmut Herrmann =

German chemist

Hartmut Herrmann is a German chemist who is a professor of atmospheric chemistry at Leipzig University and heads the Atmospheric Chemistry Department (ACD) at Leibniz Institute for Tropospheric Research (TROPOS) in Leipzig, Germany.

== Biography ==
=== Education ===
Herrmann studied chemistry at the University of Göttingen in 1982 and graduated from the Institute of Physical Chemistry in 1987. He then completed his doctorate from 1987 to 1990 on the subject of "Zeitaufgelöste Laser-Photolyse und Stopped-Flow-Untersuchungen atmosphärisch-chemischer Oxidantien in wässriger Phase" (translated: "Time-resolved laser photolysis and stopped-flow investigations of atmospheric-chemical oxidants in aqueous phase").

=== Career ===
Herrmann was initially a research assistant at the Institute for Physical Chemistry and Electrochemistry at the Gottfried Wilhelm Leibniz University of Hanover from 1990 to 1992 and then at the Institute for Physics and Theoretical Chemistry at the University of Essen. Herrmann continued to work at the latter institute as a research assistant and completed his habilitation in the Department of Chemistry in 1998. During this time, he spent several research stays at the California Institute of Technology with Michael R. Hoffmann. His research there focused mainly on photocatalysis, its applications in aqueous solution chemistry and atmospheric chemistry.

While completing his habilitation in Essen, Herrmann was appointed Professor of Atmospheric Chemistry at the University of Leipzig in 1998 as well as Head of the Atmospheric Chemistry Department (ACD) at the Leibniz Institute for Tropospheric Research (TROPOS) and the institute's Deputy Director since 2011.

== Scientific work ==
Herrmann's research aims to understand the tropospheric multiphase system to the point of its predictability. To this end, he develops models based on experimental laboratory and field tests. As part of the laboratory investigations, physical and analytical chemical methods are used to investigate processes in the gas phase, in aqueous systems, in organic particles, on surfaces as well as coupled multiphase phenomena. In the field, techniques are used to understand the chemical processing and the resulting composition of tropospheric particles, clouds, and rain in their complex interaction.

== Awards ==
- Honor Award for Scientific Excellence awarded by the American Chemical Society together with the Working Group "Environmental Chemistry"(ACSENV)
- Double-Hundred Talent Plan of the Shandong Province
- Gay-Lussac-Humboldt-Prize, 2009/2010: for excellence in science and fostering French-German scientific collaboration - first German recipient of this prize in Atmospheric Sciences

== Publications (Selection) ==
- Poulain, L., Spindler, G., Grüner, A., Tuch, T., Stieger, B., Van Pinxteren, D., Petit, J.-E., Favez, O., Herrmann, H., Wiedensohler, A. Multi-year ACSM measurements at the central European research station Melpitz (Germany) – Part 1: Instrument robustness, quality assurance, and impact of upper size cutoff diameter. Atmospheric Measurement Techniques 13, 4973-4994, doi:10.5194/amt-13-4973-2020 (2020).
- Rusumdar, A. J., Tilgner, A., Wolke, R. Treatment of non-ideality in the SPACCIM multiphase model – Part 2: Impacts on the multiphase chemical processing in deliquesced aerosol particles. Atmospheric Chemistry and Physics 20, 10351-10377, doi:10.5194/acp-20-10351-2020 (2020).
- Hoffmann, E. H., Schrödner, R., Tilgner, A., Wolke, R., Herrmann, H. CAPRAM reduction towards an operational multiphase halogen and dimethyl sulfide chemistry treatment in the chemistry transport model COSMO-MUSCAT (5.04e). Geoscientific Model Development 13, 2587-2609, doi:10.5194/gmd-13-2587-2020 (2020).
- Schaefer, T., Wen, L., Estelmann, A., Maak, J., Herrmann, H. pH- and Temperature-Dependent Kinetics of the Oxidation Reactions of OH with Succinic and Pimelic Acid in Aqueous Solution. Atmosphere 11(4), doi:10.3390/atmos11040320 (2020).
- Spranger, T., van Pinxteren, D., Herrmann, H. Atmospheric "HULIS" in Different Environments: Polarities, Molecular Sizes, and Sources Suggest More Than 50% Are Not "Humic-like". ACS Earth and Space Chemistry 4(2), 272, doi:10.1021/acsearthspacechem.9b00299 (2020).
