= Incoherent broad-band cavity-enhanced absorption spectroscopy =

Incoherent broad band cavity enhanced absorption spectroscopy (IBBCEAS), sometimes called broadband cavity enhanced extinction spectroscopy (IBBCEES), measures the transmission of light intensity through a stable optical cavity consisting of high reflectance mirrors (typically R>99.9%). The technique is realized using incoherent sources of radiation e.g. Xenon arc lamps, LEDs or supercontinuum (SC) lasers, hence the name.

Typically in IBBCEAS, the wavelength selection of the transmitted light takes place after the cavity by either dispersive or interferometric means. The light is either directly focused onto the entrance slit of a monochromator and imaged onto a charge-coupled device (CCD) array via a dispersive optical element (e.g. a diffraction grating) or imaged onto the entrance aperture of a conventional interferometer. The spectrum is reconstructed taking the Fourier transform of the recorded interferogram.

Similar to other cavity enhanced spectroscopic techniques, in IBBCEAS, the transmission signal strength is measured with and without the absorber of interest present inside the cavity ( I(λ) and I_{0}(λ) respectively). From the ratio of the wavelength-dependent transmitted intensities, the effective reflectivity of the mirrors R_{eff}(λ) and the sample path length per pass d inside the cavity, the sample's extinction coefficient α(λ) is calculated as:

$$\alpha(\lambda)=\left(\frac{I_0(\lambda)}{I(\lambda)}-1\right)\frac{1-R_\text{eff}(\lambda)}{d}$$

The sensitivity (smallest achievable α for a given sample) increases for large mirror reflectivities and large path lengths in the cavity, which is maximal, if d equals the cavity length.(1-R_{eff}) includes all unspecified losses per pass (e.g. scattering or diffraction losses) other than the losses due to the limited reflectivity of the cavity mirrors. Note that although the technique is often used for studying absorption, total light extinction, α, is retrieved, and it therefore measures the sum of absorption and scattering.

The advantages of IBBCEAS include:

- High sensitivity, experimental simplicity
- High temporal resolution
- Simultaneous detection of multiple species due to the wide spectral coverage
- No mode matching involved as in some Cavity Ring Down Spectroscopy applications (CRDS)
- Applicable to solids, liquids, gases and plasmas.
- Cost effective

The disadvantages include:

- Unlike CRDS, the sensitivity is dependent on the light source stability and the measurement accuracy of the transmitted intensity.
- It requires a reliable calibration procedure to determine baseline optical losses of the system (often performed by calibration of reflectivity as a function of wavelength using known concentrations of sample in the cavity).
- Lower spectral resolution compared to laser based methods.

== Measurement Principle IBBCEAS - Detailed Description ==
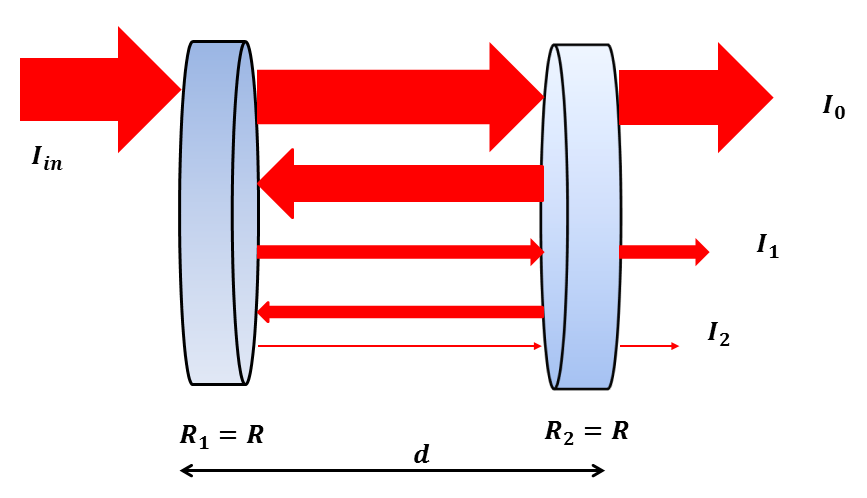
Schematic of light passing an optical cavity. Note that the arrows only illustrate time-dependence of the light intensity and not its spatial distribution inside the cavity. For instance, if injected on-axis, all reflections happen symmetrically distributed around the optical axis.

When the optical cavity is illuminated by an incoherent broadband light source like the white light of a lamp or LED, the mode structure of the cavity intensity can be neglected. Consider a cavity of length d formed by two identical high reflectivity mirrors (R_{1} = R_{2} = R > 99.9%) with losses L, which is continuously excited with incoherent light of intensity I_{in}. For an empty resonator with L = 0, the time integrated transmitted intensity I_{0} is given by

$$I_0=I_{in}\frac{1-R}{1+R}$$

The intensity of light transmitted by the cavity, I( = I_{0} + I_{1} + I_{2} + ⋯ ), can be described by the superposition of the light after an odd number of passes, leading to a geometric series:

$$I=I_{in}(1-R)^2(1-L)\sum_{n=0}^\infty R^{2n}(1-L)^{2n}$$

Since R < 1 and L < 1 the series converges to:

$$I=I_{in}\frac{(1-R)^{2}(1-L)}{1-R^{2}(1-L)^2}$$

Assuming the losses per pass to be solely due to Lambert-Beer attenuation, i.e. (1 − L) = e^{(-αd)}, the extinction coefficient, α can be written as

$$\alpha=\frac{1}{d}\left\vert\ln\left(\frac{1}{2R^{2}}\left(\sqrt{4R^{2} + \left(\frac{I_0}{I}(R^{2}-1)\right)^2}+\frac{I_0}{I}(R^2-1)\right)\right)\right\vert$$

In case of small losses per pass, L → 0, and high reflectivities of the mirrors, R → 1, α can then be approximated as

$$\alpha\approx\frac{1}{d}\left(\frac{I_0}{I}-1\right)(1-R)$$

Approximating Δ I / I _{0} ≈ (I _{0} - I) / I _{0} ≈ (I _{0} - I) / I, the minimum absorption coefficient, α_{min}, can be expressed by the following equation:

$$\alpha_{min}=\frac{1}{d}\left(\frac{\Delta I_{min}}{I_{0}}\right)(1-R)$$

where Δ I _{min} is the minimum detectable change in intensity smaller than I_{0}. The maximum sensitivity (for given R and d) is limited by the intensity of the lamp, the dispersion of the monochromator, and the noise of the detector. The above equation demonstrates that the effective path length is (1-R)^{−1} times longer than that of a conventional single pass experiment. Fiedler et al. have studied in detail the influence of cavity parameters like the cavity length, mirror curvature and reflectivity, different light injection geometries on the IBBCEAS signal.

== Experimental Setup ==
=== Free space IBBCEAS ===
A basic IBBCEAS setup consists of an incoherent light source, collimation optics, the absorber of interest and a detector. The incoherent source of radiation is spectrally filtered to match the bandwidth of the high reflectivity cavity mirrors. The filtered light is passively coupled into a stable optical cavity formed by two mirrors. Due to the high reflectivity of the mirrors effective absorption path lengths can reach a few kilometres. Light transmitted through the cavity is detected using a suitable detector, for example, a monochromator / charge-coupled device (CCD) combination interfaced with a computer. To obtain quantitative results, the reflectivity of the mirrors must be accurately determined. This is usually accomplished by measuring the reflectivity as a function of wavelength using known concentrations of a calibration sample inside the cavity. By knowing the number density n (molecules/cm3) and wavelength-dependent absorption cross-section of the calibration sample, the effective reflectivity R_{eff}(λ) can be determined by:

$$R_\text{eff}(\lambda)=1-\sigma(\lambda)nd\left(\frac{I_0}{I}-1\right)^{-1}$$

where σ(λ) is the known absorption cross-section of the gas and d is the length of the cavity.

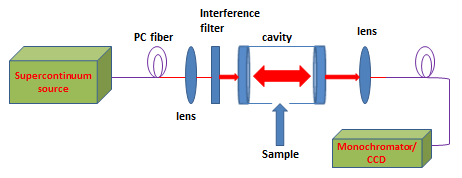
Figure 2: Basic IBBCEAS experimental setup

=== Fiber ring IBBCEAS ===
Incoherent broadband cavity-enhanced spectroscopy can be constructed also using fiber ring resonators to attain alignment-free setup. The experimental setup for the dual coupler resonator and single coupler cavity are shown in figures 3(a) and 3(b), respectively.

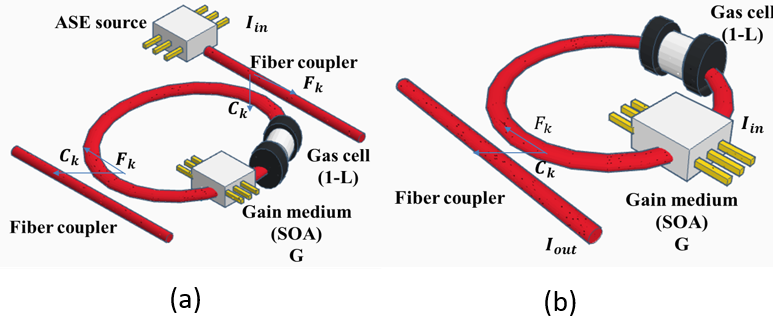
Figure 3:Fiber ring IBBCEAS experimental setup a) dual coupler b) single coupler.

Figure 3 (a) depicts the dual coupler resonator which consists of two directional couplers. On the other hand, figure 3 (b) depicts the single coupler resonator which consists of a single directional coupler. In both configurations, a gas cell is filled and a gain medium (to compensate for the loss and enhance the effective length). For the dual coupler configuration, the external source is used as a broadband source which is in our case the amplified spontaneous emission (ASE) of another gain medium. In the single coupler configuration, the ASE gain medium placed inside the cavity is used as a broadband incoherent source. In both configurations, the output of the resonator is fed to an OSA.

The response of the optical cavity should be characterized by any other means as mentioned before in the case of Free space IBBCEAS. The analysis for dual coupler configuration is the same as the analysis of free space Fabry-Perot cavity that has been done in the previous section. Yet, the analysis for single coupler configuration will vary.

== Fourier Transform Incoherent Broadband Cavity Enhanced Spectroscopy (FT-IBBCEAS) ==
Fourier Transform Incoherent Broadband Cavity Enhanced Spectroscopy (FT-IBBCEAS) is a variant of IBBCEAS which uses a Fourier transform spectrometer/photodiode instead of the conventional monochromator/CCD in order to establish a spectrum. In this case, the absorption is determined from the Fourier Transform of the intensity of light escaping the cavity. The combination of a Fourier transform spectrometer allows for high spectral resolution to be achievable, however, at the expense of good temporal resolution, making the technique less suitable for kinetic studies. On the other hand, the approach provides an improvement to conventional Fourier Transform spectroscopy for gas applications where small sample volumes are required (e.g. for discharges, combustion plasmas, flames or chemical flow reactors).

The figure above shows the spin forbidden O_{2} b-band at ~ 14500 cm^{−1} (688 nm) measured in ambient air at atmospheric pressure using a xenon arc lamp compared against a calculated HITRAN spectrum. The cavity was formed by two dielectric high reflectivity mirrors (R>0.996 at 662 nm) separated by 89 cm. The characteristic doublets of the O_{2} b-band and the bandhead of the R branch are visible in the experimental spectrum. In order to fully exploit the selectivity feature of Fourier transform spectroscopy, the near infrared region is of interest because many overtone spectra of atmospherically relevant gases are located in this part of the spectrum. Some of these studies include the detection of overtone bands of CO_{2}, OCS, CH_{3}CN and HD^{18}O in the near IR.

== Applications of IBBCEAS ==
- Pollution monitoring
- Combustion Diagnostics
- Atmospheric trace gas detection
- Aerosol science
- Breath Analysis
- Fundamental Science and Research
- Chemical Reaction Kinetics

== Selected Literature ==
Since its development in 2003, IBBCEAS has been used with a wide variety of incoherent light sources, including arc lamps, LEDs, SLEDs and supercontinnum sources.

=== Arc lamp ===
IBBCEAS was first demonstrated on the basis of the spin and symmetry forbidden γ-band $b^{1}\Sigma_{g}^{+}(v^'=2) \leftarrow X^{3}\Sigma_{g}^{-}(v^{''}=0)$ of molecular oxygen using a short-arc Xe lamp. The application of IBBCEAS to isolated jet cooled gas-phase species was demonstrated in continuous supersonic jets almost two decades ago and recently, to pulsed jets. Arc lamps have been used for cavities as small as 80 mm to study optical absorption of liquids and very long cavities of 20 m length for sensitive in situ measurements of NO_{3} and NO_{2} concentrations in an atmospheric simulation chamber. Recent studies have demonstrated their application in Evanescent Wave-IBBCEAS using a mirror-prism-mirror cavity configuration to measure absorption spectra of metallo-porphyrins in thin solution layers. Other applications of Xe lamp based IBBCEAS include its combination with discharge flow tubes for absorption measurements of marine boundary layer species like I_{2}, IO and OIO, and for measuring weak near-UV and visible gas phase absorption spectra.

=== LEDs ===
IBBCEAS has been used in conjunction with LEDs and superluminescent LEDs in a number of gas phase and liquid analyte studies. Simultaneous concentration measurements of NO_{2} and NO_{3} have been achieved using LED based IBBCEAS within the ppbv detection limit. The advantages of using LEDs as light source are their compactness, long life, power efficiency and price. Also, due to the small area emission, the emitted power per unit area at the peak wavelength can approach that of Xe arc lamps. However, the LED output is often temperature dependent; hence they require temperature stabilization for IBBCEAS applications. More recently, LED-IBBCEAS has been applied to simultaneous open path measurements of HONO and NO_{2} in the UV region with detection limits of 430 pptv and 1 ppbv respectively and acquisition times in the order of a few seconds.

=== Supercontinuum radiation sources ===
SC sources are attractive for spectroscopic applications owing to their broad wavelength coverage, which enables spectral signatures of multiple species to be detected simultaneously. In comparison to lamps and LEDs, these sources provide higher spectral brightness, permitting more rapid measurements to be performed. Detection sensitivities at picomolar concentration levels in solution have been reported for BBCEAS measurements with SC sources with signal acquisition times in the lower millisecond range. Though initial studies on FT-IBBCEAS reported lower sensitivities in comparison with CRDS experiments, more recent breath analysis applications with supercontinuum sources have reported sensitivities in the order of 10^{−9} cm^{−1} within 4 minutes acquisition time.
