= Jean-Marc Moura =

French literary scholar

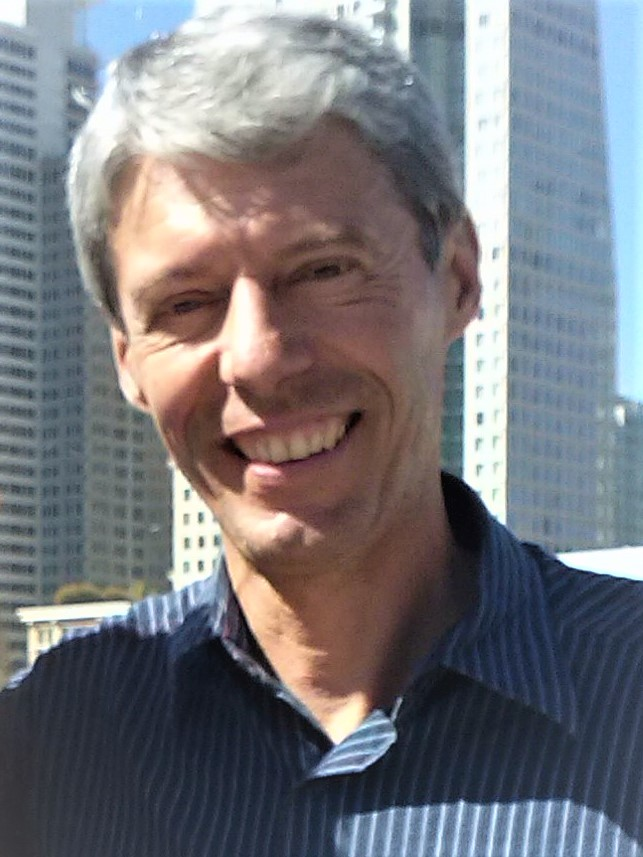
Jean-Marc Moura

Jean-Marc Moura (born 5 May 1956) is a French literary scholar. He is considered to have pioneered post-colonial studies in French literature.

Moura is a member of the Institut Universitaire de France. Since 2014, he has been a member of the Academia Europaea.

== Biography ==
Jean-Marc Moura was born on 5 May 1956 in Montreuil. He earned a PhD in comparative literature from the University of Sorbonne Nouvelle in 1986. He has been a Professor of comparative literature at the Lille University between 1996 and 2008, and a Professor of comparative and francophone literature at the Paris Nanterre University since 2008.

In 2003, he was awarded the Gay-Lussac-Humboldt prize of the Alexander von Humboldt Stiftung for his research.

In 2011–2012, Moura was a fellow at the Royal Flemish Academy of Belgium for Science and the Arts.
