= Gramme (river) =

River in Germany

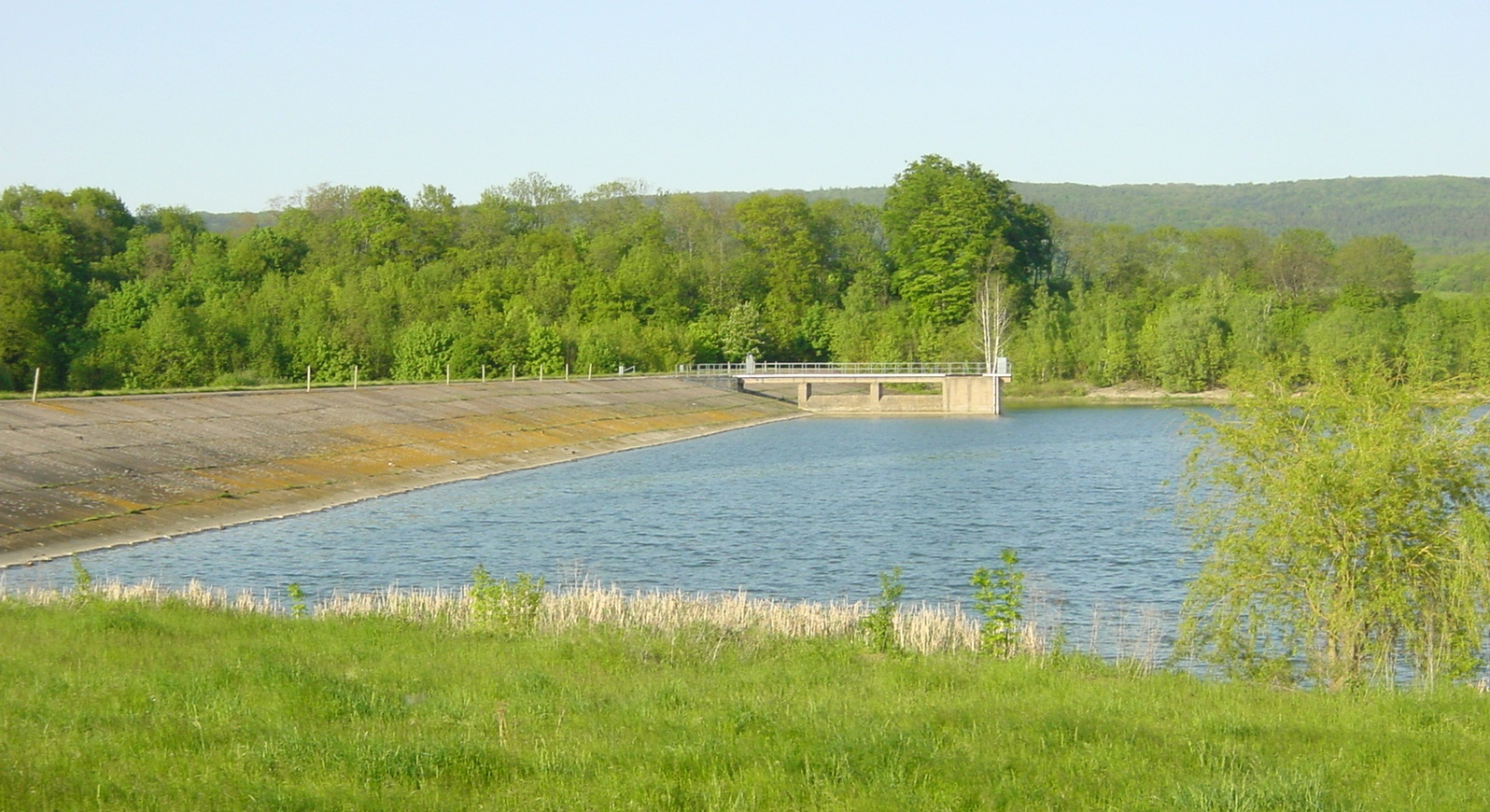

Location
- Country: Germany
- States: Thuringia

Physical characteristics
- Mouth
  - location: Unstrut
  - coordinates: 51.1540°N 11.0249°E

Basin features
- Progression: Unstrut→ Saale→ Elbe→ North Sea

The Gramme (German pronunciation: [ˈɡʁamə]) is a river of Thuringia, Germany. It flows into the Unstrut near Wundersleben.

== Etymology ==
The body of water was first mentioned in a document in 1265 as Gramma. The name is derived from the Germanic gremma- meaning "furious, raging".

== See also ==
- List of rivers of Thuringia
