= Guy Ourisson =

French chemist (1926–2006)

Guy Henry Ourisson (March 26, 1926 – November 4, 2006) was a French chemist. He was a member of the Academy of Sciences where he was vice president and then became the president. Awarded the Ernest Guenther Award in 1972 and the Heinrich Wieland Prize in 1985.

== Career ==
In 1952 he obtained a PhD from Harvard University. In 1954 he obtained a doctorate in physics from the Sorbonne under the direction of G. Dupont. At the University of Strasbourg he was appointed lecturer in 1955, professor in 1958 and professor emeritus in 1995.

He died, aged 80, in Strasbourg.

== Bibliography ==
- http://www.education.gouv.fr/cid2032/desaffection-des-etudiants-pour-les-etudes-scientifiques.html
