= Cash =

Physical currency and other immediately accessible liquid assets

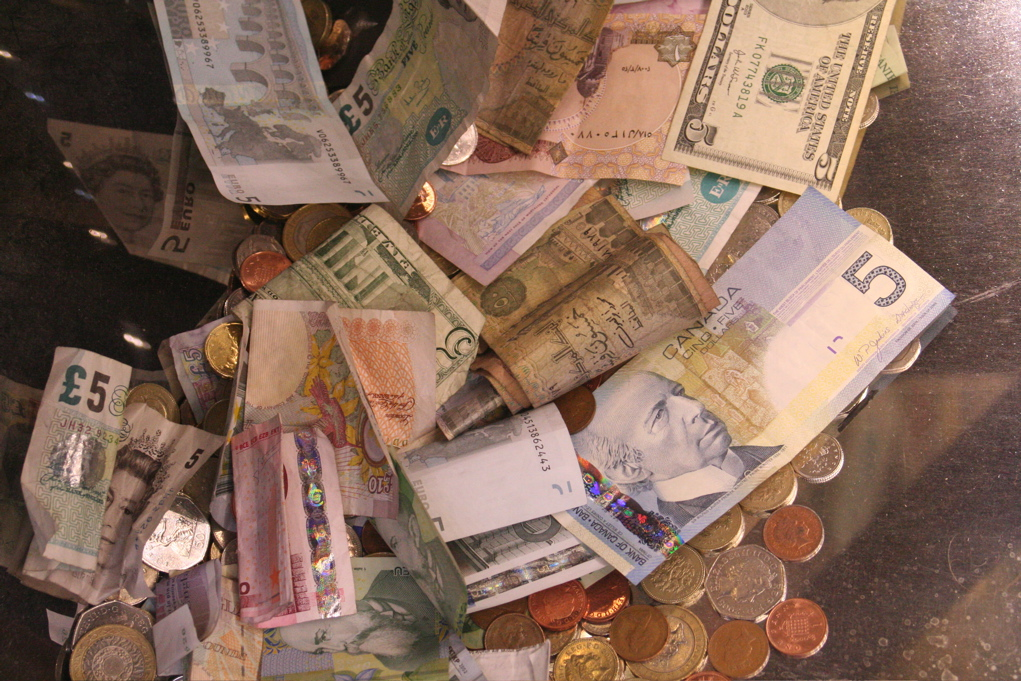
Banknotes and coins of various currencies

Cash is money in the tangible form of currency, such as banknotes and coins.

In book-keeping and financial accounting, cash is current assets comprising currency or currency equivalents that can be accessed immediately or near-immediately (as in the case of money market accounts). Cash is seen either as a reserve for payments, in case of a structural or incidental negative cash flow, or as a way to avoid a downturn on financial markets.

== Etymology ==
The English word cash originally meant 'money box', and later came to have a secondary meaning 'money'. This secondary usage became the sole meaning in the 18th century. The word cash comes from the Middle French caisse 'money box', which comes from the Old Italian cassa, and ultimately from the Latin capsa 'box'.

== History ==
In Western Europe, after the fall of the Western Roman Empire, coins, silver jewelry and hacksilver (silver objects hacked into pieces) were for centuries the only form of money, until Venetian merchants started using silver bars for large transactions in the early Middle Ages. In a separate development, Venetian merchants started using paper bills, instructing their banker to make payments. Similar marked silver bars were in use in lands where the Venetian merchants had established representative offices. The Byzantine Empire and several states in the Balkan area and Kievan Rus also used marked silver bars for large payments. As the world economy developed and silver supplies increased, in particular after the colonization of South America, coins became larger and a standard coin for international payment developed from the 15th century: the Spanish and Spanish colonial coin of 8 reales. Its counterpart in gold was the Venetian ducat.

Coin types would compete for markets. By conquering foreign markets, the issuing rulers would enjoy extra income from seigniorage (the difference between the value of the coin and the value of the metal the coin was made of). Successful coin types of high nobility would be copied by lower nobility for seigniorage. Imitations were usually of a lower weight, undermining the popularity of the original. As feudal states coalesced into kingdoms, imitation of silver types abated, but gold coins, in particular, the gold ducat and the gold florin were still issued as trade coins: coins without a fixed value, going by weight. Colonial powers also sought to take away market share from Spain by issuing trade coin equivalents of silver Spanish coins, without much success.

In the early part of the 17th century, English East India Company coins were minted in England and shipped to the East. In England, over time the word cash was adopted from Sanskrit कर्ष karsa, a weight of gold or silver but akin to the Old Persian 𐎣𐎼𐏁 karsha, unit of weight (83.30 grams). East India Company coinage had both Urdu and English writing on it, to facilitate its use within the trade. In 1671, the directors of the East India Company ordered a mint to be established at Bombay, known as Bombaim. In 1677 this was sanctioned by the Crown, the coins, having received royal sanction, were struck as silver rupees; the inscription runs "The rupee of Bombaim", by the authority of Charles II.

Around that time, coins were also being produced for the East India Company at the Madras mint. The Tamil the word for money is kaasu, which may have been modified into 'cash'. Both words, 'kaasu' and 'cash', have the same meaning, unlike money box. The currency at the company's Bombay and Bengal administrative regions was the rupee. At Madras, however, the company's accounts were reckoned in pagodas, fractions, fanams, faluce and cash. This system was maintained until 1818 when the rupee was adopted as the unit of currency for the company's operations.

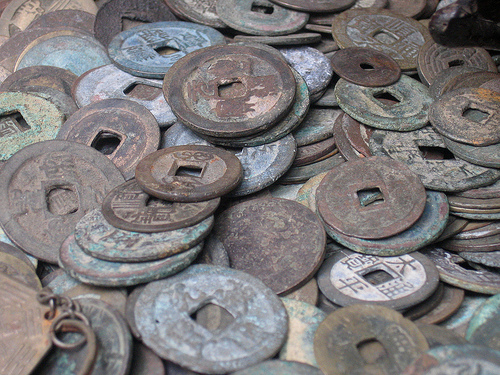
Traditional holed Chinese coinage is also known as cash.

Paper money was first used in China during the Tang dynasty, 500 years prior to it catching on in Europe. During his visit to China in the 13th century, Marco Polo was amazed to find that people traded paper money for goods rather than valuable coins made of silver or gold. He wrote extensively about how the Great Kaan used a part of the mulberry tree to create the paper money as well as the process with which a seal was used to impress on the paper to authenticate it. Marco Polo also talks about the chance of forgery and states that someone caught forging money would be punished with death. In the 17th century, European countries started to use paper money in part due to a shortage of precious metals, leading to fewer coins being produced and put into circulation. At first, it was most popular in the colonies of European powers. In the 18th century, important paper issues were made in colonies such as Ceylon and the bordering colonies of Essequibo, Demerara and Berbice. John Law did pioneering work on banknotes with the Banque Royale. The relation between money supply and inflation was still imperfectly understood and the bank went under rendering its notes worthless, because they had been over-issued. The lessons learned were applied to the Bank of England, which played a crucial role in financing the Peninsular War against French troops, hamstrung by a metallic Franc de Germinal.

The ability to create paper money made nation-states responsible for the management of inflation, through control of the money supply. It also made a direct relation between the metal of the coin and its denomination superfluous. From 1816, coins generally became token money, though some large silver and gold coins remained standard coins until 1927. The World War I saw standard coins disappear to a very large extent. Afterward, standard gold coins, mainly British sovereigns, would still be used in colonies and less developed economies and silver Maria Theresa thalers dated 1780 would be struck as trade coins for countries in East Asia until 1946 and possibly later locally.

Cash has now become a very small part of the money supply. Its remaining role is to provide a form of currency storage and payment for those who do not wish to take part in other systems, and make small payments conveniently and promptly, though this latter role is being replaced more and more frequently by electronic payment systems. Research has found that the demand for cash decreases as debit card usage increases because merchants need to make less change for customer purchases.

Cash is increasing in circulation. The amount of the United States dollar in circulation increased by 42% from 2007 to 2012. The amount of pound sterling banknotes in circulation increased by 29% from 2008 to 2013. The amount of euro in circulation increased by 34% from August 2008 to August 2013 (2% of the increase was due to the adoption of euro in Slovakia 2009 and in Estonia 2011).

== Motives of cash holding ==
In economic theory (according Keynesian economics), the cash holding of cash (especially sight deposits) is roughly attributed to three motives:

- Transactions motive
- Precautionary motive
- Speculative motive.

The transactions motive covers the business needs of economic subjects, the precautionary motive serves to hold money for liquidity purposes and to provide for crisis situations, and the speculation motive, according to John Maynard Keynes, results from the uncertainty about future interest rate developments and relates to financial investments.

In addition to this purely economic importance, there are other aspects of cash use:

- Anonymous payment without disclosing personal data
- Trust to the central bank (control and publication of money creation)
- Activation of a reward center in the brain (anticipation of reaching a specific goal)
- Expenditure control (immediate physical payment)
- Tradition (haptic experience, e.g. monetary donation; long-term reliability of value retention)
- Inclusion (equal participation in economic life for all)
- Identification (symbolic character, solidarity and group membership)
- Educational tool for children (objective handling of assets and expenses)
- Paying a tip as immediate recognition of good service.

In practice, there may be a combination of such motives, with the precautionary motive of preserving value and anonymous payment being decisive. Due to its unique characteristics, there is no perfect substitute for cash. Demonetisation or capital control can destabilize the economy if electronic means of payment are not readily available (e.g. 2016 Indian banknote demonetisation).

== Cash in circulation ==
Cash in circulation is characterized by strong seasonal fluctuations. Wage and salary payment dates, tax payment dates or holidays lead to statistically perceptible increases in cash in circulation, for which the credit institutions are preparing. Since cash holdings at banks do not earn interest and can also lead to security problems (bank robbery), banks usually only hold very small amounts of cash. They are therefore forced to involve the central bank in times of higher cash requirements. Therefore, the cash in circulation only remains unchanged if the banks hand over cash from their own cash holdings to their bank customers or take cash deposits from their customers into their own holdings.

The ratio of the cash in circulation in relation to the gross domestic product (cash to GDP ratio) is a good indicator of cash usage and payment behavior in an economy. In countries like the United States, increased use of debit and credit cards is increasing the amount of cash in circulation at a slower rate than in countries with a high amount of cash payments. In 2018, it ranged from 1.3% (in Sweden) to more than 21% (in Japan), 10.5% in Switzerland and 10.7% in the eurozone.

Since around 2018, exacerbated by the COVID-19 pandemic, cash in circulation in the eurozone has increased significantly while the share of cash payments (i.e. transactions) has decreased, known as the paradox of banknotes. Analyses show that private households are increasingly keeping cash as a precaution against crises and that negative interest rates also play a role. This effect is also observed in many other currency areas, e.g. in the United States and Japan.

== Banknote tracking ==
In most jurisdictions, banknotes are not routinely tracked by serial number. There are the following exceptions in cash applications:

- Registration of ransom money for blackmail (e.g. for the Oetker kidnapping)
- Macroeconomic studies of cash flows through the central bank
- Statistical recording of the lifespan of banknotes by the central bank
- Tracking the (location-based) migration of individual banknotes using EuroBillTracker for euro banknotes, Where's George? for US dollars and Where's Willy? for Canadian dollars as a hobby
- Use of individual banknotes for sharing messages with recipients using the mobile app smill.

Since 2016, the People's Bank of China has requested the recording of banknotes issued and deposited at ATMs and bank counters, arguing that counterfeit money will be prosecuted.

With Directive ECB/2010/14, the European Central Bank (ECB) requires banks to check the authenticity of deposited and withdrawn banknotes at bank counters and ATMs using tested devices. They are required to trace the origin of suspected counterfeit banknotes to the depositing account holder. They must also physically seize any counterfeit notes and coins.

== Competition of cash ==
=== Cashless payments ===
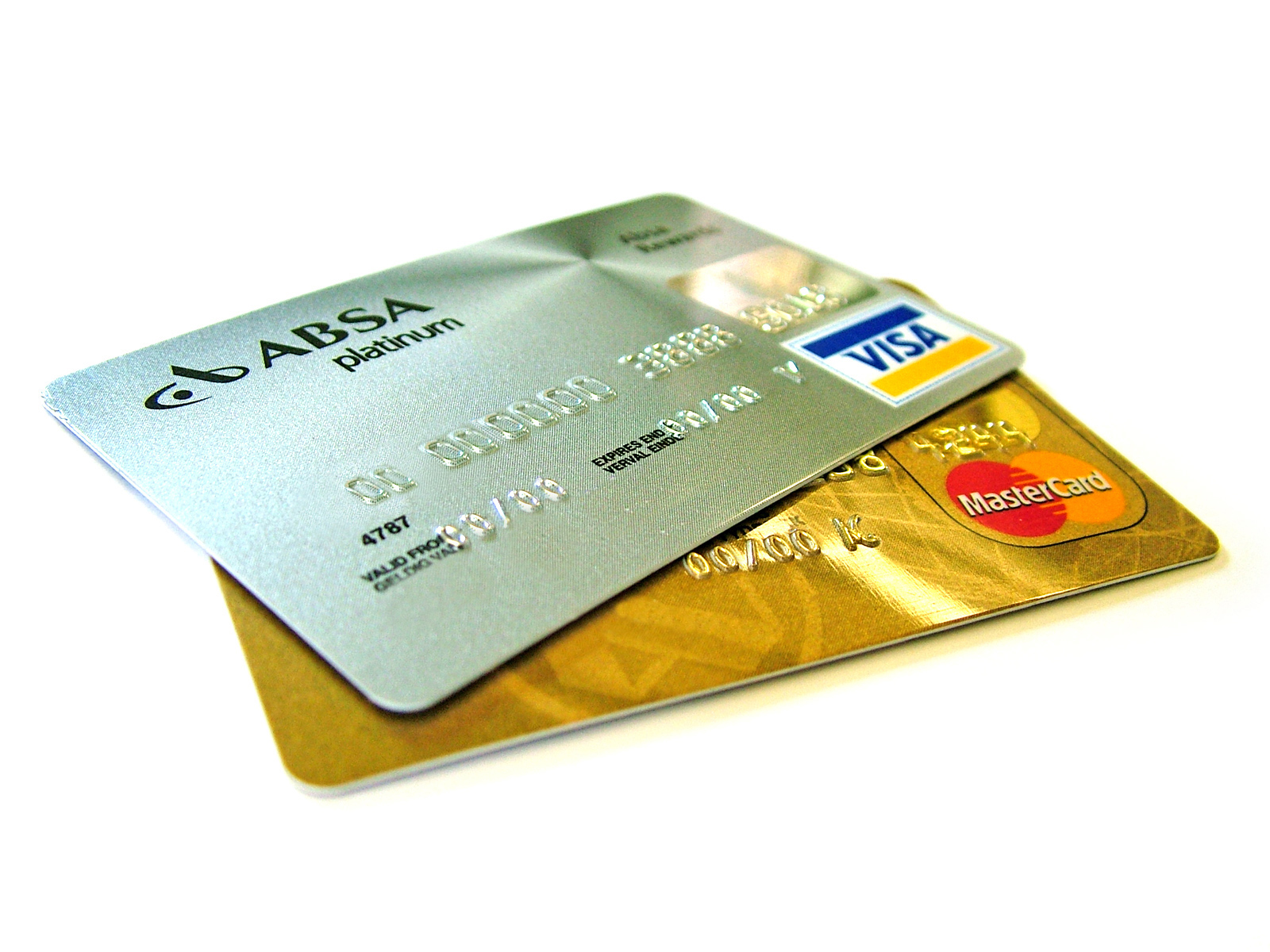
Credit cards are used for cashless payments. With a credit card, the credit card company grants a line of credit to the card holder. The card holder can make purchases from merchants, and borrow the money for these purchases from the credit card company.

Cashless society can be defined as one in which all financial transactions are handled through "digital" forms (debit and credit cards) in preference to cash (physical banknotes and coins). Cashless societies have been a part of history from the very beginning of human existence. Barter and other methods of exchange were used to conduct a wide variety of trade transactions during this time period.

Since the 1980s, the use of banknotes has increasingly been displaced by credit and debit cards, electronic money transfers and mobile payments, but much slower than expected. The cashless society has been predicted for more than forty years, but cash remains the most widely used payment instrument in the world and on all continents. In 17 out of 24 studied countries, cash represents more than 50% of all payment transactions, with Austria at 85%, Germany at 80%, France at 68%. The United Kingdom at 42%, Australia at 37%, United States at 32%, Sweden at 20%, and South Korea at 14% are among the countries with lower cash usage.

By the 2010s, cash was no longer the preferred method of payment in the United States. In 2016, the United States User Consumer Survey Study reported that three out of four of the participants preferred a debit or credit card payment instead of cash. Some nations have contributed to this trend, by regulating what type of transactions can be conducted with cash and setting limits on the amount of cash that can be used in a single transaction.

Cash is still the primary means of payment (and store of value) for unbanked people with a low income and helps avoiding debt traps due to uncontrolled spending of money. It supports anonymity and avoids tracking for economic or political reasons. In addition, cash is the only means for contingency planning in order to mitigate risks in case of natural disasters or failures of the technical infrastructure like a large-scale power blackout or shutdown of the communication network. Therefore, central banks and governments are increasingly driving the sufficient availability of cash. The US Federal Reserve has provided guidelines for the continuity of cash services, and the Swedish government is concerned about the consequences in abandoning cash and is considering to pass a law requiring all banks to handle cash.

=== Digital and virtual currencies ===
Digital currency is a generic term for various approaches to support secure transactions of the public or using a distributed ledger, like blockchain, as a new technology for decentralized asset management. The blockchain 1.0 era has enabled the application of virtual digital currencies in the marketplace, such as money transfer and payment systems. It considers establishing an electronic version of the national currency which is backed by the central bank as the issuer. Virtual currency is a digital representation of value that is neither issued by a central bank or a public authority, such as Bitcoin. Facebook's concept for the diem is based on a token to be backed by financial assets such as a basket of national currencies.

In 2012, Bank of Canada was considering introducing digital currency. Meanwhile, it rates digital currency a fairly complicated decision and is analyzing the pros and cons and working to determine under which conditions it may make sense to, one day, issue a digital currency. As a threat, a central bank digital currency could increase the risk of a run on the banking system.

Also in 2012, Sveriges Riksbank, the central bank of Sweden, was reported to analyze technological advances with regard to electronic money and payment methods for digital currency as an alternative to cash. In 2019, it is investigating whether Swedish krona need to be made available in electronic form, the so-called e-krona, and if so, how it would affect Swedish legislation and the Riksbank's task. It has started procuring a technical supplier to develop and test solutions for a potential future e-krona. No decisions have yet been taken on issuing an e-krona.

=== Costs of payment ===
An analysis by the Deutsche Bundesbank in 2017 found that a cash payment in retail costs an average of 24 euro cents, while payments with a girocard cost 30 cents (or often 0.3 to 0.4% of sales plus a transaction fee) and with a credit card charge one euro which is included in the sales price. This is why retailers often refuse to accept card payments below a minimum amount. Depending on the account model, there are also booking costs for the account holder with an average of 35 euro cents charged for each(!) account posting. Because of this convenient source of income, commercial banks and credit card companies favor cashless payments.

In the case of cashless payment transactions, in addition to the documentation of the payment itself, the personal details of the payer are usually linked to the data of the payee according to the Know Your Customer (KYC) principle. This enables the payment process to be precisely traced for the payer and the payee. The constant increase in digitization leads to a more detailed recording of cashless payment transactions and their evaluation for advertising and marketing campaigns. Since this digital documentation is usually more centralized than before, the potential for abuse increases. On the other hand, the cash transactions are anonymous, unless purchasing profiles are recorded with the help of loyalty programs based on customer cards, and keep the payment landscape competitive.

== Cash in constitutions ==
=== Austria ===
In August 2023, Chancellor of Austria Karl Nehammer came out in support for enshrining cash in the Austrian constitution. This came after the Freedom Party of Austria campaigned on the idea.

=== Hungary ===
In February 2025, Prime minister of Hungary Viktor Orbán announced plans to enshrine the right to use cash in the Hungarian Constitution. This was first proposed by the far-right Mi Hazánk. In April 2025, the Hungarian parliament passed these constitutional amendments.

=== Switzerland ===
In 2023, the Swiss government supported moves to have a constitutional protection for cash. This came after a popular initiative asked for it.

=== Slovakia ===
In June 2023, the Slovak parliament voted with the support of 111 of 150 MPs to put the right to use cash in the Constitution of Slovakia. The amendment was proposed by the Sme Rodina party.

== See also ==
- Automated teller machine – Device used to perform financial transactions
- Banknote counter – Machine that counts money
- Banknote processing – Automated process to check banknotes
- Banknote seal (China) – Historical anti-counterfeiting measure
- Cash and cash equivalents – Highly liquid, short-term assets
- Cashback (disambiguation)
- Cash management – Measures of managing short-term cash in the company
  - Cashflow – Movement of money into or out of a business, project, or financial product
- Cash register – Device to register and calculate retail sales
- Cash transfers – Direct transfer payment of money to an eligible person
- Currency symbol – Symbol used to represent a monetary currency's name
- Inflation – Devaluation of money's purchasing power
- Inflation hedge – Investment intended to protect an investor against inflation or hedge
- Money creation – Process by which the money supply of an economic region is increased
- Petty cash – Funds in the form of cash
- Rebate (marketing) – Buying discount scheme
- Unconditional cash transfer – Providing welfare programs without any conditions upon the receivers' actions
