= Weavers' cottage (Kleinschwarzenbach, Zum Weberhaus 10) =

Cultural heritage site in Helmbrechts, Germany

Coordinates: 50°14′49″N 11°42′25″E

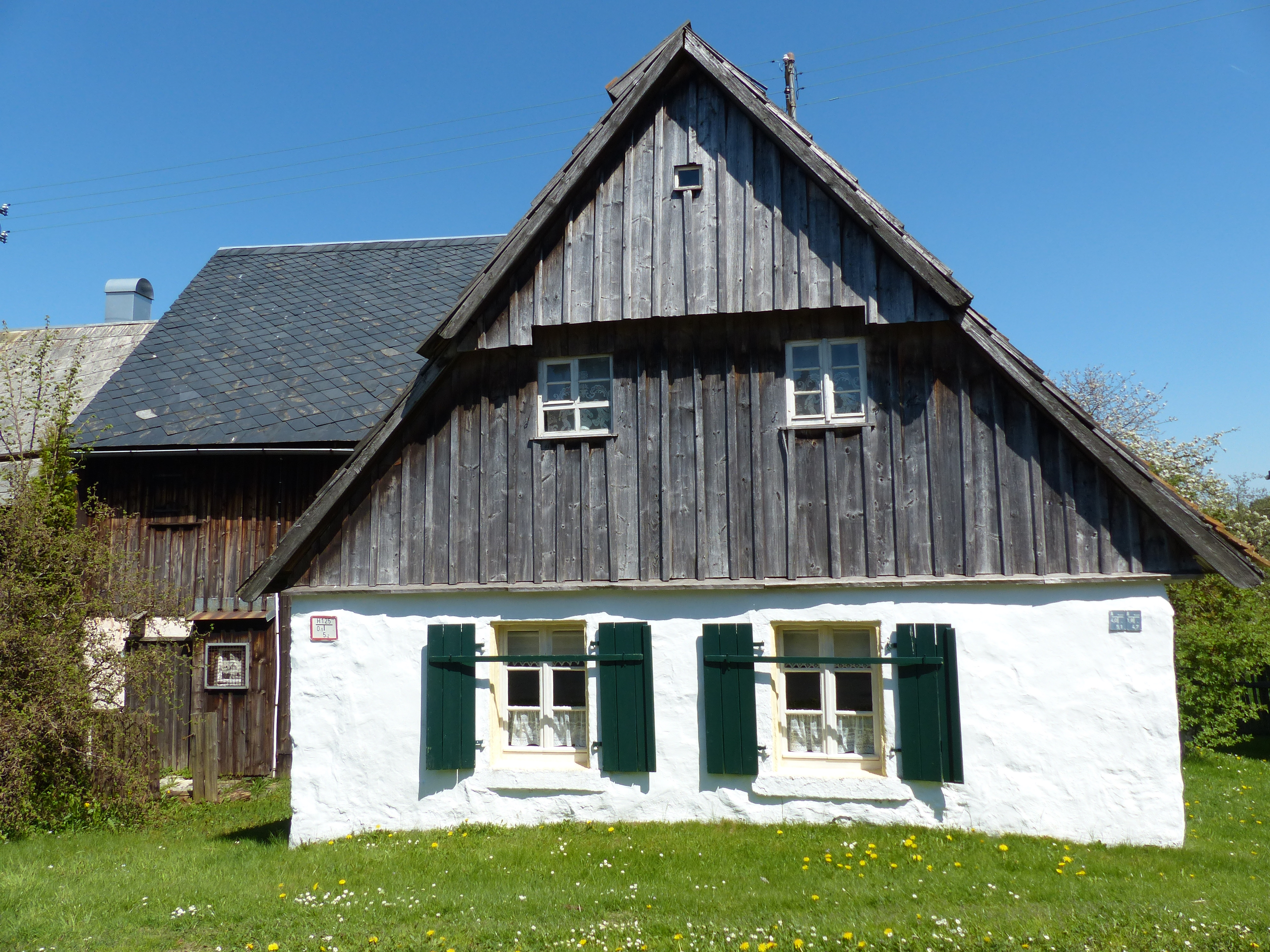
Front of the weavers' cottage, 2016

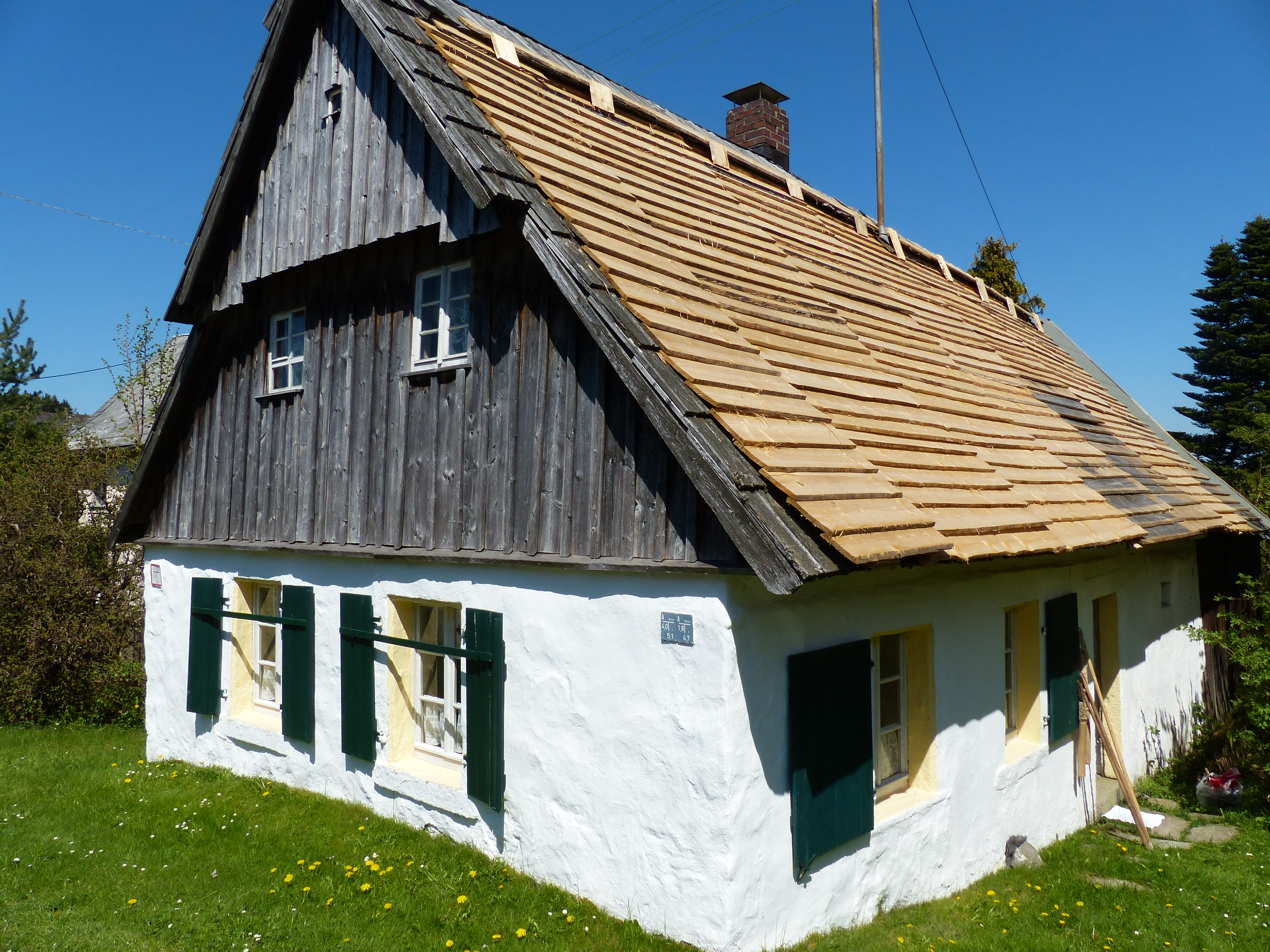
Side of the house with a temporary cover of the roof

The weavers' cottage is a heritage site in the village of Kleinschwarzenbach in Helmbrechts, Bavaria, Germany. It is an example of the cultural heritage and the way of life of the weavers in pre-industrial times in the Franconian Forest.

== Architectural features ==
Weberhaus 10 is a one-story building with a thatched gable roof. It dates to the 18th century. The Bavarian State Office for Monument Protection has assigned it number D-4-75-136-35.

Among other typical features these houses have a very characteristic roof (German: Frackdach), and the family and animals lived under the same roof (a byre-dwelling). In this village there are more former weavers' cottages, but over the centuries some of them have gone through considerable changes. The weavers' cottage of Kleinschwarzenbach was part of a special exposition called Zwischenlichten (German for 'twilight') at the Upper Franconian Textile Museum in Helmbrechts.

Originally, it was a drophouse (German: Tropfhaus or Trüpfhaus), meaning that the plot belonged to the weaver only as far as the rain drops fell from the roof. But over time additional land became a sign of the owners' modest wealth.

== Location ==
The weavers' cottage is located near the village centre, off the main road to Schwarzenbach am Wald. In the village street called Zum Weberhaus there are two other weavers' cottages listed for protection.

== Bibliography ==
- Tilmann Breuer: Landkreis Münchberg. In: Die Kunstdenkmäler von Bayern, Kurzinventare, XIII. Band. Deutscher Kunstverlag. München 1961. S. 22. (German)
- Edwin Greim: Weberdorf Kleinschwarzenbach 1408-2008. (in German)
