= DoshTracker =

- A screen shot taken from the 2015 DoshTracker website
- Website type: Money circulation tracker
- Available in: English
- Owner: Richard Dutton
- Creator: Richard Dutton
- Website: http://www.doshtracker.com/
- Registration: Optional
- Launched: 2001
- Current status: Defunct

DoshTracker was a currency bill tracking website that allows pound sterling banknotes to be tracked around the United Kingdom and abroad. Originally launched in 2001, it was relaunched in 2012.

Dosh is a British slang term for money.

== History ==
The concept of the website is based on Where's George? and EuroBillTracker, which follows United States Dollar or Euro banknotes, and in the same way allows users to enter the serial number on notes that they own and see where it has been.

This site originally operated between 2001 and 2006 but was taken down due to lack of free time on the site owner Richard Dutton's behalf, tracking its last note on 18 May 2006.

The site was relaunched on 1 January 2012, but has been inactive since 2018.

== Controversy ==
The site discourages marking the notes with any sort of identification such as a URL, as defacing of bank notes is technically illegal.

== Press Coverage ==
Shortly after the site's launch in 2001, its reputation quickly spread and it gained a relatively large amount of media coverage and reviews from both internet, radio and written media, they included;

- 26 July 2001 – St Petersburg Times
- 11 Oct 2001 – Computer Weekly: Downtime (printed publication (Back Cover))
- 30 Oct 2001 – Yahoo UK & Ireland Pick of the Day
- 5 Nov 2001 – Yahoo UK & Ireland Pick of the Week
- 14 Nov 2001 – The Mirror – 'Kelly's i' Site of the Day (printed publication (page 40) & website)
- 28 Nov 2001 – 103.5 & 95.3 FM BBC Radio Essex's Drivetime Website of the Week
- 29 Nov 2001 – BBC Radio 5 Live – Simon Mayo – Websites of the Week: Expert's Choice (radio mention & website)
- 4 Dec 2001 – The Daily Telegraph Website Money Section – City Diary
- 16 Dec 2001 – Wales on Sunday – 'G@me On: Keep Track of Your Cash'
