= Hildner =

Hildner is a German language habitational surname for someone from a place called Hilden. Notable people with the name include:

- Ruth Elfriede Hildner (1919–1947), German guard at several Nazi concentration camps during World War II
- Terence Hildner (1962–2012), United States Army General Officer
