= Dirk Brockmann =

German system biologist (born 1969)

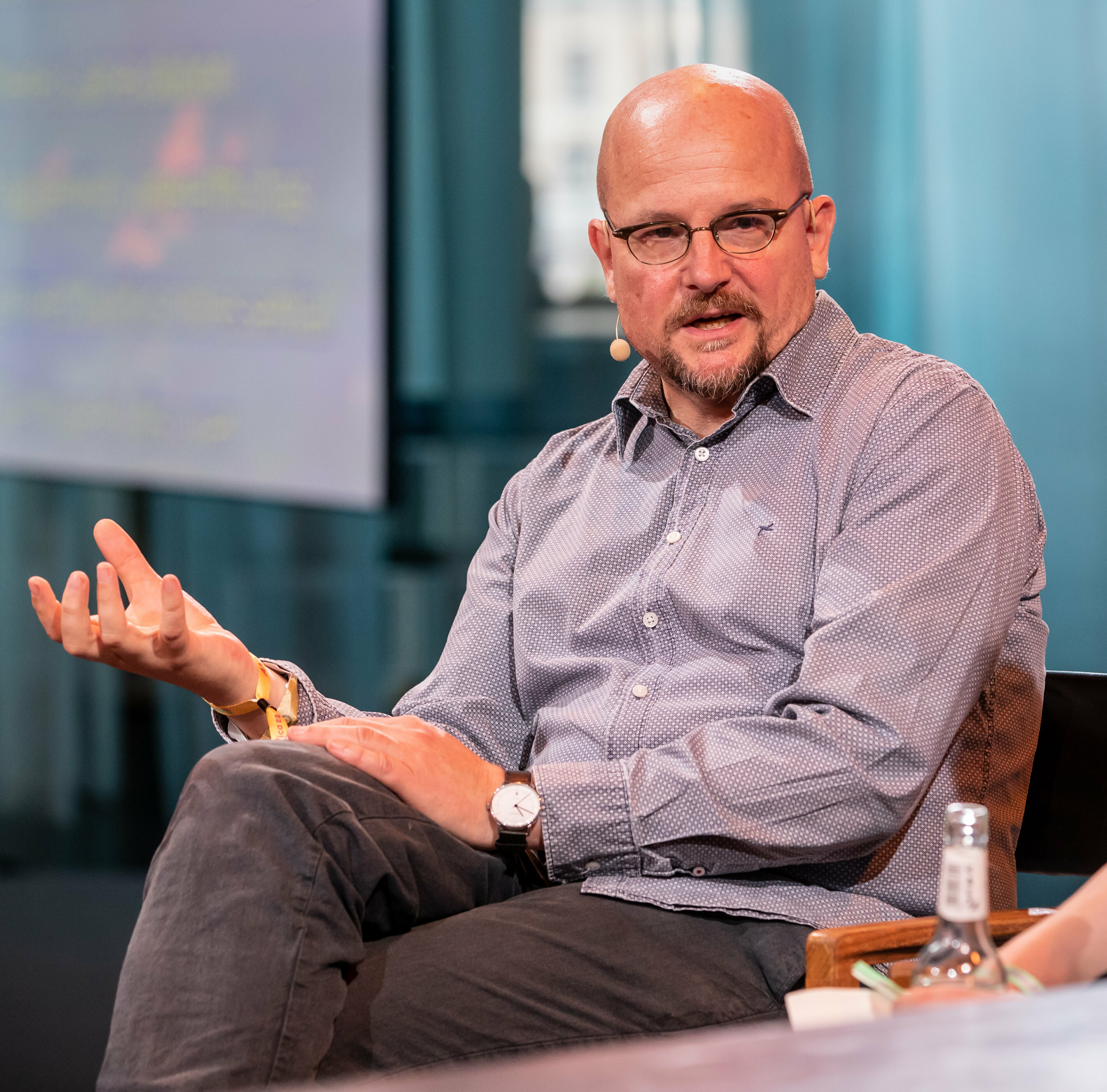
- Brockmann at re:publica in 2022
- Born: September 2, 1969 (age 56); Braunschweig, Germany
- Education: Duke University; University of Göttingen; Max Planck Institute for Dynamics and Self-Organization
- Scientific career
- Institutions: Northwestern University; Humboldt University of Berlin; Robert Koch Institute; Technische Universität Dresden
- Doctoral advisor: Theo Geisel
- Website: synosys.github.io

Dirk Brockmann (born September 2, 1969) is a German physicist and Professor in Biology of Complex Systems and the founding director of the Center Synergy of Systems at Technische Universität Dresden. Brockmann is known for his work in complex systems, complex networks, computational epidemiology, human mobility and anomalous diffusion.

== Education and career ==
Brockmann was born in Braunschweig and studied physics and mathematics at Duke University and the University of Göttingen where he received his degree in theoretical physics in 1995 and his PhD in 2003 under the supervision of Theo Geisel. After postdoctoral positions at the Max Planck Institute for Dynamics and Self-Organization, Göttingen he became associate professor in the Department of Engineering Sciences and Applied Mathematics at Northwestern University in 2008.

In 2013 he returned to Germany, where he became professor at the Institute for Biology at Humboldt University of Berlin with a project group at the Robert Koch Institute. During the COVID-19 pandemic Brockmann initiated and led multiple big data projects to mitigate the pandemic as the mobility monitor, contact monitor and the Corona Data Donation Project.

Since October 2023, he is Professor in Biology of Complex Systems at Technische Universität Dresden and the founding director of the Center Synergy of Systems (SynoSys), which promotes complexity research with a trans-/anti-disciplinary approach.

Brockmann worked on a variety of topics ranging from computational neuroscience, anomalous diffusion, Levy flights, human mobility, computational epidemiology, and complex networks.

== Research ==
Brockmann pioneered the scientific use of mass data collected in online games in a 2006 study in which he and his colleagues analyzed the geographic circulation of millions of dollar-bills registered at the online bill tracking website Where's George? This study lead to the discovery of universal scaling laws in human mobility, the forecast of spreading routes of the 2009 flu pandemic in the United States and effective geographic borders in the United States. Brockmann also pioneered the development of computational models and forecast systems for the global spread of epidemics based on global air-transportation. In a 2013 study Brockmann and his colleague Dirk Helbing showed that complex global contagion phenomena can be mapped onto simple propagating wave patterns using the theoretical concept of effective distance. This method was employed for import risk estimates during the Ebola virus epidemic in West Africa in 2014.

Brockmann's research has been featured in an episode of the American crime drama television series Numbers.

Since 2017 he has been publishing "Complexity Explorables", which are interactive D3 animations of complex systems.
