= Currency tracking =

The term currency tracking may refer to more than one article:

- Currency bill tracking, the process of tracking the retail movements of banknotes
- Fixed exchange rate, a system of currency value management, by tracking another currency or currencies
- Crawling peg, another system of currency value management, by tracking a basket of currencies
