= Where's Willy? =

Canadian dollar note tracking website

- Website type: Money circulation tracker
- Available in: English; French
- Creator: Hank Eskin
- Website: www.whereswilly.com
- Registration: Optional
- Launched: February 20, 2001; 25 years ago
- Current status: Active

Where's Willy? is a website that tracks Canadian paper money, most commonly $5 bills, but also higher denominations. "Where's Willy" is free, supported by users who pay a fee for extra features. The name Willy refers to Sir Wilfrid Laurier - the seventh Prime Minister of Canada whose portrait appears on the $5 banknote.

Where's Willy? is a currency tracking spin-off of Where's George, a site that tracks United States dollars.

== History ==
The free site, established by Hank Eskin, a computer consultant in Brookline, Massachusetts, allows people to enter their local postal code and the serial and series of any Canadian denomination from $5 up to $100 they want to track. Once a bill is registered, the site reports the time between sightings, the distance travelled and any comments from the finders, and anyone who registered the bill earlier learns about it by e-mail and/or text messaging.

To increase the chance of having a bill reported, users write or stamp text on the bills encouraging bill finders to visit whereswilly.com and track the bill's travels.

Since Canada has replaced the one and two dollar bills with more durable coins, the $5 note is the smallest denomination tracked by Where's Willy.

In April 2003, USA Today named whereswilly.com one of its "Hot Sites".

In 2005, the Montreal Mirror described the hobby as "the most joy to be had with the five-dollar bill since the illegal defacing of Laurier with Spock ears." While the Mirror describes this practice as illegal, a 2015 statement from the Bank of Canada explained that "Spocking Fives" does not violate the Bank of Canada Act or the Criminal Code.

As of June 7, 2021, Where's Willy? was tracking more than 5,800,000 bills totaling nearly $85,000,000.

Researchers studying pandemics have used currency tracking sites to plot human travel patterns, to find clues on how to combat the spread of diseases like SARS.

== Willy Index ==
The "Willy Index" is a method of rating users based on how many bills they've entered and also by how many total hits they've had. The formula is as follows:

$100\times\left[\sqrt{\ln({\rm bills\ entered})}+\ln({\rm hits}+1)\right]\times[1-({\rm days\ of\ inactivity}/100)]$

Because of the nature of square roots and natural logarithms, the higher a user's bills entered and hits are, the more of each are necessary to increase the score.

== Statistical facts ==
| | Inventoried banknotes as of August 14, 2024 |
| Province/territory | Total |
|---|---|
| Alberta | 361,343 |
| British Columbia | 660,741 |
| Manitoba | 513,188 |
| New Brunswick | 427,768 |
| Newfoundland and Labrador | 46,816 |
| Northwest Territories | 12,334 |
| Nova Scotia | 347,834 |
| Nunavut | 1,014 |
| Ontario | 2,849,967 |
| Prince Edward Island | 25,821 |
| Quebec | 1,411,686 |
| Saskatchewan | 145,301 |
| Yukon | 3,227 |

== See also ==
- Currency bill tracking
- EuroBillTracker
- Twenty Bucks - movie about the travels of a $20 bill
- Where's George? - American currency tracker
