= Eberhard Bodenschatz =

German physicist

Eberhard Bodenschatz (born April 22, 1959) is a German physicist. He was born in Rehau, Bavaria. He received his doctorate in theoretical physics from the University of Bayreuth in 1989. In 1991, during his postdoctoral research at the University of California, Santa Barbara, he received a faculty position in experimental physics at Cornell University. From 1992 until 2005, during his tenure at Cornell he was a visiting professor at the University of California, San Diego (1999-2000). In 2003 he became a Scientific Member of the Max Planck Society and an Adjunct Director (2003-2005)/ Director (since 2005) at the Max Planck Institute for Dynamics and Self-Organization. He continues to have close ties to Cornell University, where he is Adjunct Professor of Physics and of Mechanical and Aerospace Engineering (since 2005).

He was elected a Fellow of the American Physical Society in 2003.

== Video ==
- Video on Eberhard Bodenschatz's research (Latest Thinking)
