= Stamp Stampede =

US campaign for election finance reform

- Stamp money out of politics
- Formation: 2012
- Website: Stamp Stampede

Stamp Stampede is a grassroots campaign mobilizing people across the United States to stamp messages on American currency in support of passing a constitutional amendment to get money out of politics. Ben Cohen, the co-founder of Ben & Jerry's ice cream, spearheaded the campaign. They promote stamping through the distribution of rubber stamps, public stamping activities and national tours in the Stamp Mobile. The rubber stamps include different messages, such as: "Money is not free speech," "Not to be used for bribing politicians," "Corporations are not people; amend the Constitution," and "The system isn’t broken, it's fixed."

== Background ==
The Stamp Stampede campaign launched in October 2012. According to OpenSecrets, outside groups, candidates, political parties and political action committees spent over US$6 billion in the 2012 elections, the highest expenditure of any US election. The Stamp Stampede supports a proposed 28th amendment to overturn Citizens United v. FEC and other Supreme Court cases. The proposed amendment declares that money is not free speech and corporations are not people. The Stamp Stampede works in partnership with other groups including American Promise, Move to Amend, Public Citizen and People for the American Way.

== Currency circulation ==
Picture of a stamped one dollar bill

On average, dollar bills stay in circulation for five years and pass through approximately 1,750 hands. As Ben Cohen told Wired: "It's a really effective way of breaking through the clutter and interacting with people...I see it as a really cost-effective form of guerrilla marketing." The campaign concluded that every dollar bill is seen by an average of 875 people, meaning that if 100 people stamped ten dollars a day for a year, the messages would reach over 300 million people. Ben Cohen describes it as a "petition on steroids". The campaign drew inspiration from Where's George? which has marked and tracked over 215 million dollar bills since 1998.

== Stamp Mobile ==
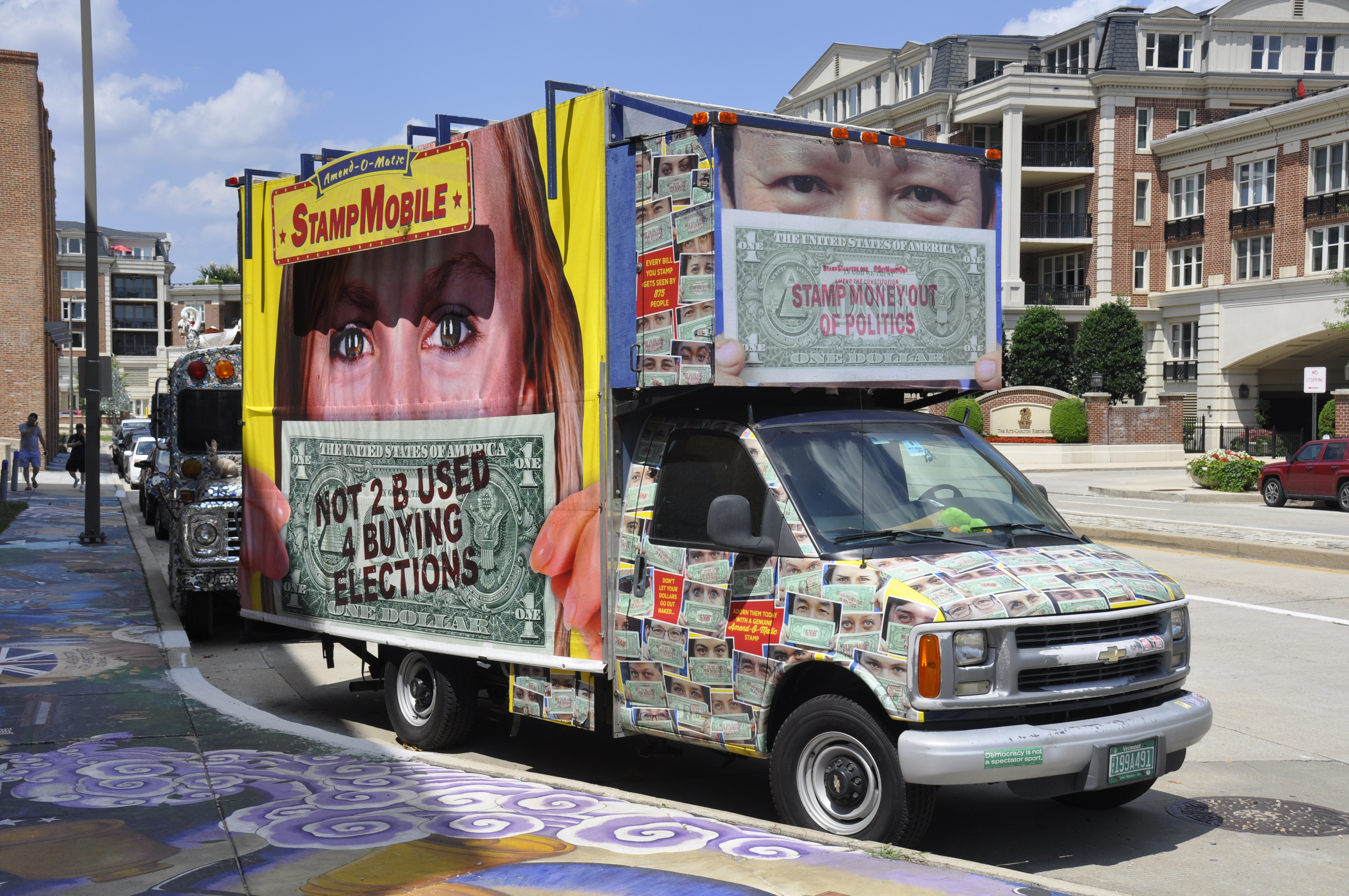
The Amend-O-Matic Stamp Mobile

The Stamp Mobile, or Amend-o-Matic, is a Rube Goldberg contraption mounted on the back of a converted box truck. It was conceived by Ben and Alan Rorie. Users insert a dollar bill, which travels a long and circuitous path and is finally stamped, in bold red text, with one of four different messages and returned to the user. The first national tour was disrupted by Hurricane Sandy and mechanical problems, but the tour was scheduled to continue in 2013.

In April 2016, after several years on the road, and an estimated 100,000 bill imprints, the Stamp Mobile made its final tour stop at the American Visionary Art Museum (AVAM) in Baltimore, Maryland. The day after their brief detention at a big-money protest in DC, Ben & Jerry were on hand to promote the campaign and donate the Stamp Mobile to the museum collection.

== Legal implications ==
According to the legal opinion posted on the Stamp Stampede website, the campaign is legal. In an interview with Pioneer Magazine, Ben Cohen notes "It's a fairly commonly held view that putting marks on dollar bills is not legal, but that's not the case." Stamp Stampede argues that the stamping of U.S. currency is protected as "expressive conduct" under the First Amendment as long as it does not promote a specific candidate or business.
