= Stephan Herminghaus =

German physicist

Stephan Herminghaus is a German physicist. He received a PhD in Physics from the University of Mainz in 1989. His postdoctoral stay was at the IBM Research Center in San Jose, California (USA), in 1990 . He completed his habilitation at the University of Konstanz in 1994 and was the head of an independent research group at the MPI for Colloids and Interfaces, Berlin, from 1996 until 1999. He then became a full professor at the University of Ulm from 1999 until 2003. Since 2003, he has been a director at the Max Planck Institute for Dynamics and Self-Organization (MPI-DS), Göttingen. Since 2005, he has an additional appointment as an adjunct professor at the University of Göttingen. Further, he was appointed as Professeur Invité at Université Paris VI for the winter term 2006/07. As a director of the MPI-DS, Stephan Herminghaus retired in 2023.

== Video ==
- Video on Stephan Herminghaus's research (Latest Thinking)
