= Helmbrechts concentration camp =

Coordinates: 50°13′59.876″N 11°41′59.996″E

As a Nazi concentration camp for forced labor, Helmbrechts concentration camp was a women's subcamp of the Flossenbürg concentration camp founded near Helmbrechts near Hof, Germany in the summer of 1944. The first prisoners who came to the camp were political prisoners from the Ravensbrück camp in northern Germany. Later Jewish prisoners were brought.

== History ==
In the beginning, no barracks were completed so the women slept in the factory hall. Eventually twelve barracks were completed, but only four were for prisoners living quarters. Fifty-four guards served at the camp; twenty-seven men and twenty-seven women. Most of the women guards served at other camps; many trained at Flossenburg, two at Gross Rosen and some in Ravensbrück concentration camp before they arrived at Helmbrechts. The male guards were mostly older Germans or ethnic Germans who were no longer combat worthy.

Herta Haase, Erna Achtenberg, Ellia Mains, Ingeborg Schimming-Assmuss, and Ruth Hildner were some of the female SS troops stationed in the camp. The male guards profiles however are unknown by the most part. According to a postwar testimony of overseer Elli Mains, relations between the male and female guards were "very good." The camps population was mainly non-Jews, but in March 1945, a group of over 500 Jewish women arrived on foot from the Grünberg subcamp in Poland.

Conditions for the Jewish prisoners at Helmbrechts were brutal with vicious guards and primitive facilities. One prisoner who stayed there a month on the Volary death march writes of sleeping on dirt floors with no blankets. Nor was there access to toilets; only two barrels in the corner of the barracks served 400 women in the barracks, many of whom suffered from dysentery. The guards regularly beat them in the morning for the mess. Weissman Klein reports that each morning the guards came by with a wheelbarrow to haul away the bodies of those who died in the night. Many also died as a result of beatings.

=== Evacuation (death march) ===
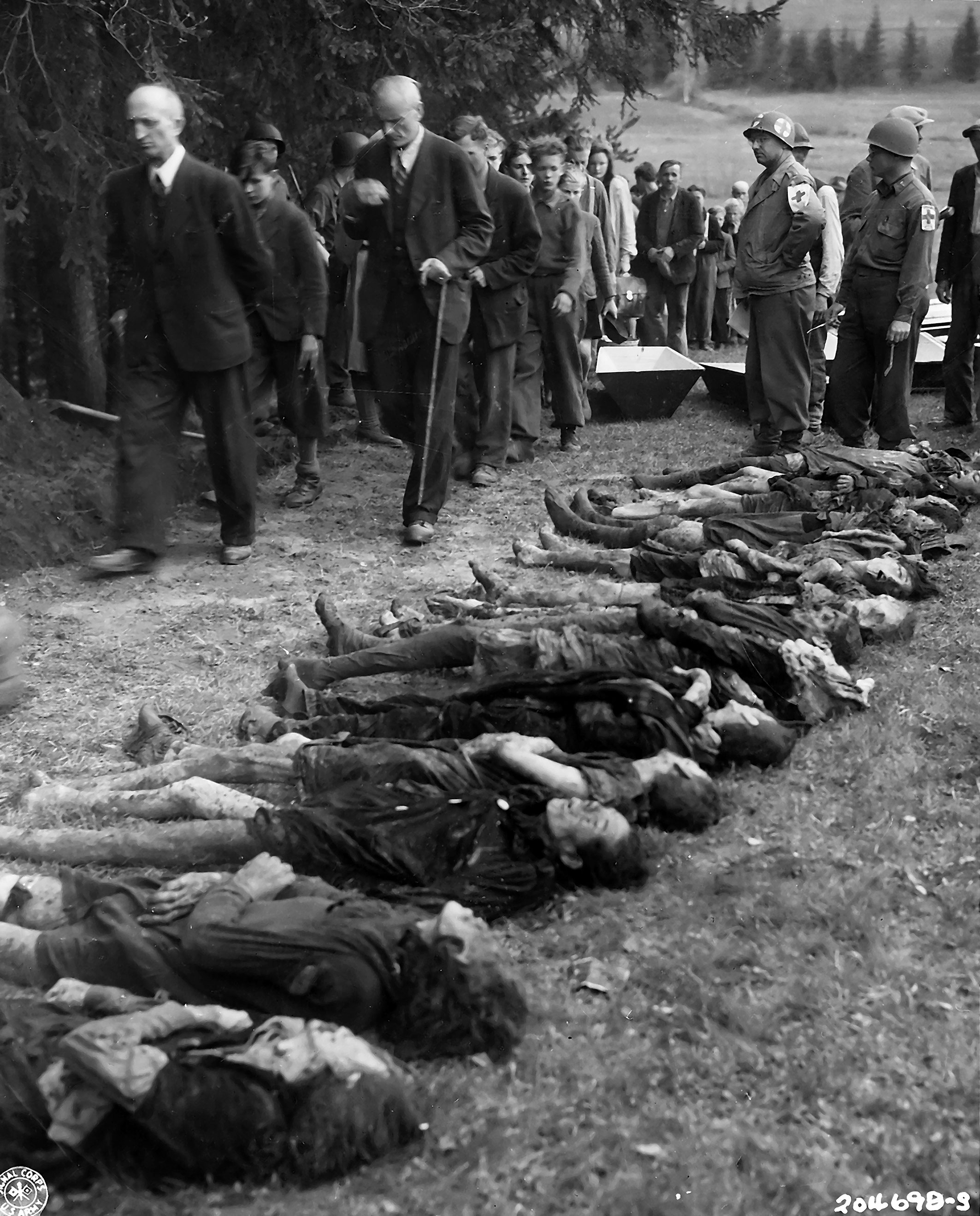
May 11, 1945: German civilians are forced to walk past the bodies of 30 Jewish women starved to death by German SS troops in a 500-kilometre (300 mi) march across Czechoslovakia from Helmbrechts concentration camp. Buried in shallow graves in Volary, Czechoslovakia, the bodies were exhumed by German civilians working under the direction of Medics of the 5th Infantry Division, US Third Army. The bodies were later placed in coffins and reburied in the cemetery in Volary.

In early April 1945 the front closed in on Germany. Commandant Doerr ordered the women and a few men, one being a rabbi, to depart on a death march to the Dachau concentration camp. The extra clothing in the camp was given to the non-Jewish prisoners. Along the way the Nazi guards learned that the US Army liberated the camp and turned the march into (then still occupied) Czechoslovakia. The Germans left all the non-Jewish women at the Zwodau (Svatava) subcamp on the seventh day of the march but took with them the more than 500 Jewish women. Those women marched another two weeks, until May 6, most of them dying from starvation, disease, and the beatings and shootings of the guards. On May 6, they were liberated at Volary, Czechoslovakia. The camp at Helmbrechts was liberated the same day as Bergen Belsen, April 15, but no inmates remained behind.

=== Postwar fate of one of the camp guards ===
In 1996 renewed attention focused on the Helmbrechts sub-concentration camp. Two stories broke about former SS-Aufseherin ("Overseer") Ingeborg Schimming-Assmuss who was accused of killing four prisoners at the camp and on the death march into Czechoslovakia. One article began "DEATH FORSTALLED the LAW." "The [camp] called her 'the Terrible Inge'- Inge Assmuss, earlier Schimming, one of 27 [female guards] inside the external bearing Helmbrechts." She was hidden from prosecution by the State Security Service in Berlin for over 50 years. The first record of murder was done by Ingeborg, as well as the other female guards in Helmbrechts on February 24, 1945. She and the other overseers flogged to death a female inmate, Dr. Alexandra Samoylenko, as punishment for having escaped. The act was tolerated and ordered by camp commandant Alois Doerr. Another former prisoner related, "...on the first day after the march [began] an Aufseherin--she was called Inge--tore my completely weakened friend Bassia from my arms with a switch and dragged her into the forest. I heard a shot. Subsequently, the Aufseherin returned alone." Two other inmates also related to Allied forces that the Aufseherin killed other internees. In 1951 a warrant was issued for Ingeborg's arrest to the GDR. Authorities in East Berlin refused to hand over the former SS employee, saying that 'she works for us.' In 1989 the Berlin Wall fell and Inge was still living in East Berlin, scarcely fifty meters from the former wall. In 1994 she was discovered living in Berlin-Pankow. In 1996 Ingeborg Schimming-Assmuss died, a free woman. The German government was in the process of prosecuting the former female guard, but as the title of the article stated, death stopped all proceedings. She was seventy-four years old.
