= Viola Priesemann =

German physicist and neuroscientist (born 1982)

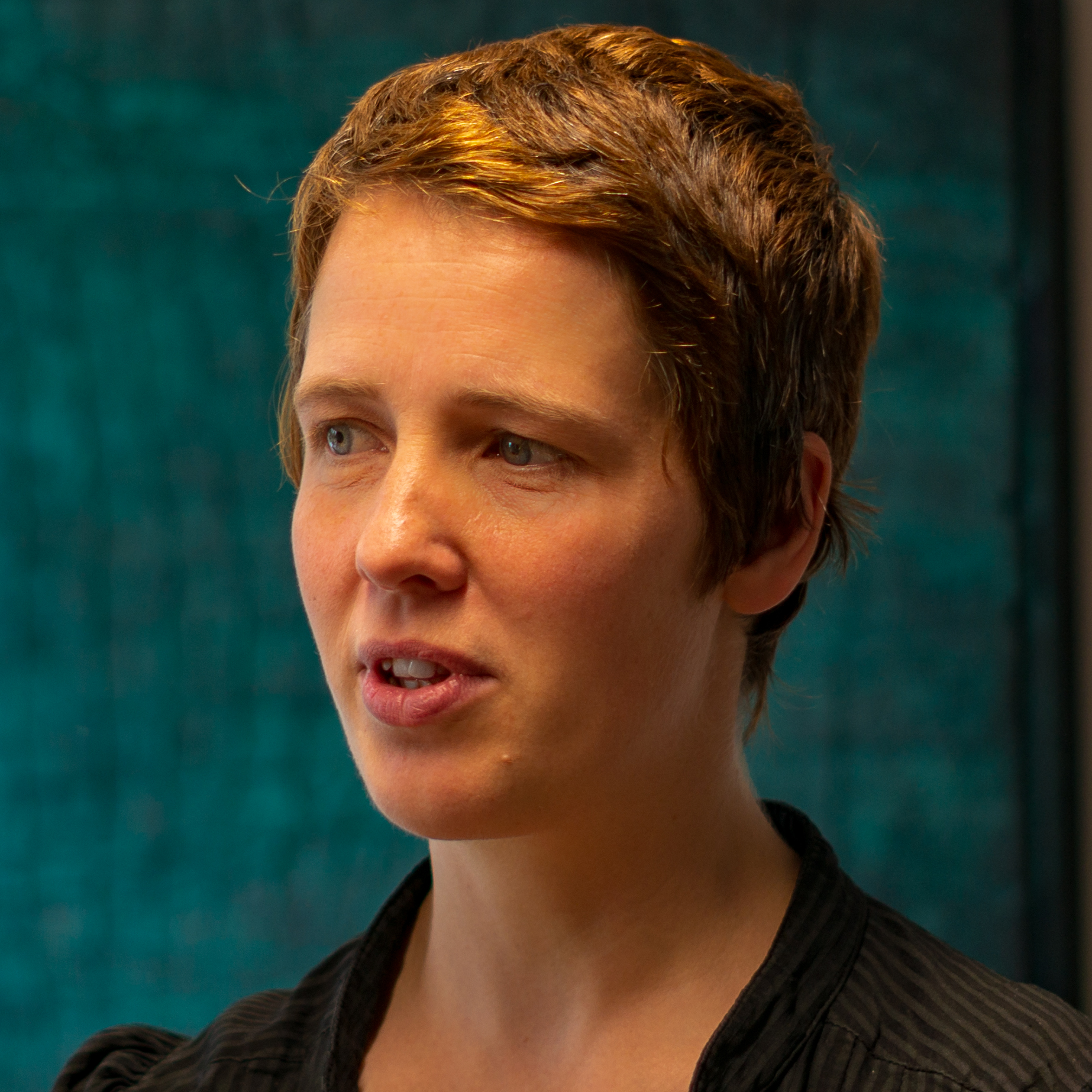
- (Photograph by Joao Pinheiro Neto)
- Born: April 28, 1982 (age 44); Bobingen, Germany
- Education: Technische Universität Darmstadt
- Scientific career
- Doctoral advisor: Theo Geisel
- Other academic advisors: Gilles Laurent

Viola Priesemann (born 28 April 1982) is a German physicist and computational neuroscientist. One of her research priorities is to explore how the human brain organizes its neuronal capacities, to enable meaningful information processing.

== Education and career ==
Viola Priesemann was born in Bobingen, Germany. She studied physics at the Technische Universität Darmstadt. She conducted research on neural information processing at the École normale supérieure in Paris, at the California Institute of Technology, and at the Max Planck Institute for Brain Research in Frankfurt. Priesemann's doctoral thesis focused on propagation dynamics in neural networks and the role of phase transitions in information processing.

After working as a postdoc with Theo Geisel, she became a fellow at the Bernstein Center for Computational Neuroscience Göttingen in 2014 and successfully applied for an independent Max Planck Research Group in 2015, which she currently leads at the Max Planck Institute for Dynamics and Self-Organization in Göttingen. She studies propagation processes in complex systems and the self-organization and emergence of information processing in living and artificial neural networks.

== Media appearances ==
In the course of the COVID-19 pandemic, Priesemann researched the spread and containment strategies of the coronavirus SARS-CoV-2 and also increasingly appeared in public. She was co-author and first signatory of the statements of the non-university research institutions, the John Snow Memorandum and the Leopoldina. She is initiator of a Pan-European Statement, which emphasizes the need for a common European approach to COVID-19 containment and presents a clear action plan. The weekly newspaper Die Zeit devoted a multi-page dossier to the mathematical study of the pandemic by Priesemann and her research group at the Max Planck Institute in December 2020.

== Corona-related research ==
Priesemann has been calculating scenarios of how the spread of the SARS-CoV-2 coronavirus accelerates or weakens under different conditions ever since the outbreak of the corona pandemic. During the first wave of SARS-CoV-2, Germany was one among many countries introducing rules for social distancing in order to slow down the spreading of the virus. In comparison to other countries in Europe, the death rates were relatively low in Germany. According to an article published in Science, the timing and coordination of the various measurements were also based on Priesemann's calculations on the quantification of the virus. The code on which the related calculations have been based is freely available and adaptable to various countries or regional scenarios. In addition to looking at the basic reproduction number (R), Priesemann observed that besides the risks associated with the R-value rising above 1, a further tipping point may be reached when the number of infections is rising so fast that the health authorities fail to identify infected persons, tested as positive fast enough to test (and if necessary isolate) contact persons. Priesemann developed a containment strategy that employed "Social Bubbles". An article on this approach was published in The Lancet and ended up finding its way into several statements on how to contain Covid in Europe. Priesemann is one of the scientists supporting various public statements issued by the German National Academy of Sciences Leopoldina.

== Awards ==
- 2010 Thomas B. Grave and Elizabeth F. Grave Scholarship
- 2014–2015 Chair of the Computational Neuroscience Social at the Annual Meeting of the SfN
- 2015 Fellow of the Elisabeth Schiemann Kolleg
- 2016–2017 German-Israel Foundation Young Investigator Grant
- 2016–2018 Project leader Physics to Medicine Initiative
- 2021 Communitas Prize of the Max Planck Society
