= Ramin Golestanian =

Iranian physicist

Ramin Golestanian FRS FInstP
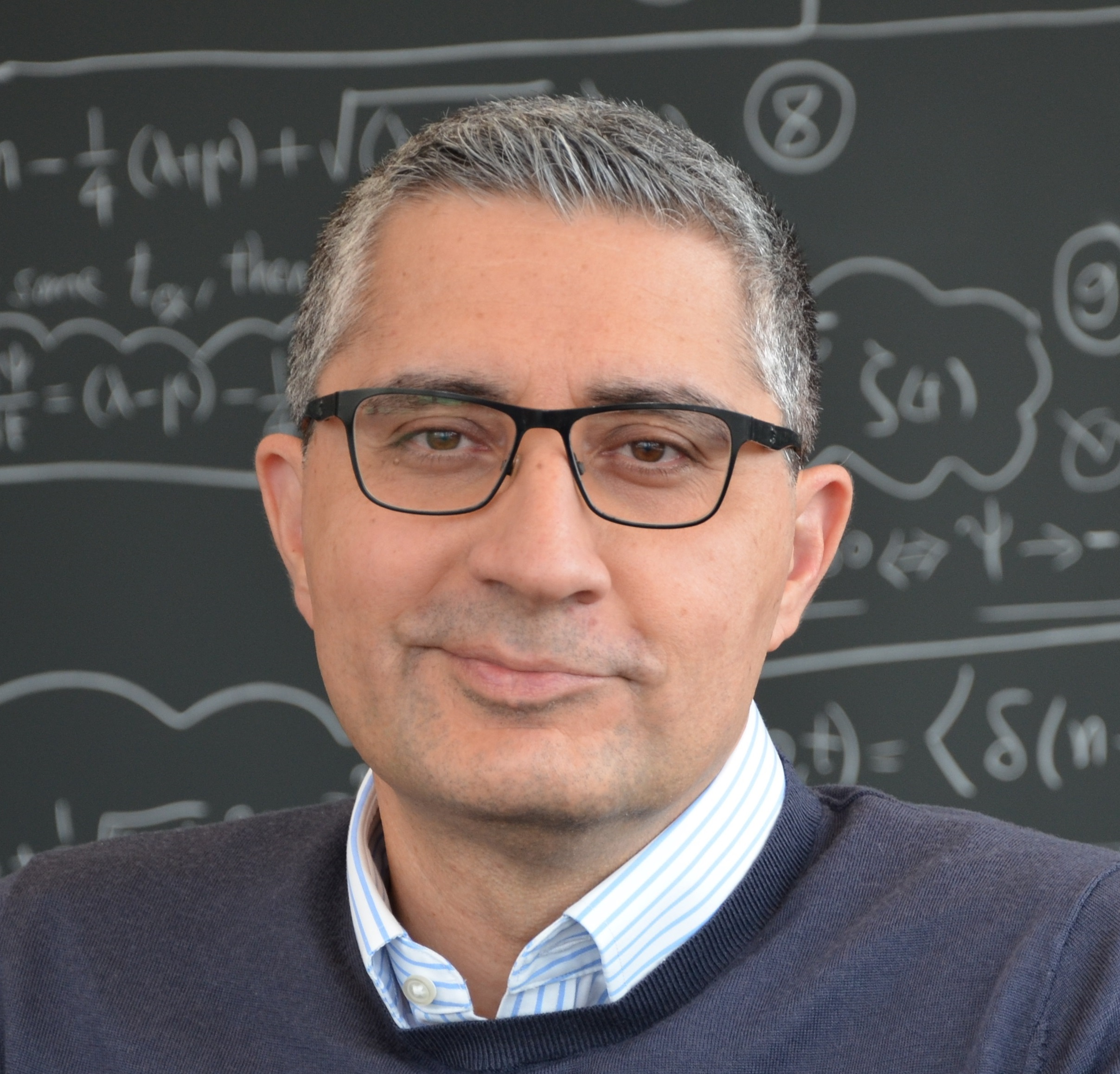
- Golestanian in 2021
- Born: 26 February 1971 (age 55); Paris, France
- Known for: Active Matter; Statistical Physics
- Awards: Holweck Medal (2014)
- Scientific career
- Fields: Physics
- Workplaces: Max Planck Institute for Dynamics and Self-organization; University of Oxford
- Doctoral advisor: Mehran Kardar

Ramin Golestanian FRS (Persian: رامین گلستانیان) is a theoretical physicist who specializes in active matter and non-equilibrium statistical physics. He is director at the Max Planck Institute for Dynamics and Self-Organization in Göttingen, Germany, heading the department of Living Matter Physics, and professor at the Department of Physics and the Rudolf Peierls Centre for Theoretical Physics at Oxford University. He is an honorary professor at the University of Göttingen.

He is distinguished for his approach to the study of biological systems by viewing them as living condensed matter. In particular, he has championed the idea of using basic principles that govern the non-equilibrium physics and chemistry of microscopic systems to design artificial or synthetic active mechanical functional modules, such as motors, enzymes, swimmers, and active colloids, which exhibit a wealth of emergent collective properties.

== Early life and education ==
He was born on 26 February 1971 in Paris, France. He grew up in Tehran and graduated from Alborz High School in 1989. In the same year, he won a bronze medal at the 20th International Physics Olympiad (IPhO) in Poland. This was the first time Iran took part in this international competition. He obtained his B.Sc. from Sharif University of Technology (1993), and his M.Sc. (1995) and Ph.D. (1998) from the Institute for Advanced Studies in Basic Sciences (IASBS). His PhD research work was on fluctuation-induced phenomena and Casimir effect, under (remote) supervision of Mehran Kardar.

== Academic career ==
He has been a visiting scholar at MIT, Postdoctoral Fellow at the Kavli Institute for Theoretical Physics at UCSB, Joliot Chair and CNRS visiting professor at ESPCI ParisTech, and visiting professor at Collège de France. Before joining Oxford University in 2010, he held academic positions at IASBS (2000-2005) and the University of Sheffield (2005-2010).

== Awards and honours ==
Golestanian is elected Fellow of the Royal Society (2026), member of the Göttingen Academy of Sciences and Humanities (2021), Fellow of the American Physical Society (2017), and Fellow of the Institute of Physics (2011). He is recipient of Chaire Paris-Sciences (2022), EPJE Pierre-Gilles de Gennes Lecture Prize (2017), Royal Society Wolfson Research Merit Award (2017), Martin Gutzwiller Fellowship of the MPI-PKS (2017), 50th-Anniversary Most Distinguished Alumni Award of Sharif University of Technology (2016), Fernand Holweck Medal and Prize of the Société Française de Physique and the Institute of Physics (2014), and Nakamura Lecturer Award of UCSB (2014).
