= Theo Geisel (physicist) =

German physicist (born 1948)

Dr. Theo Geisel
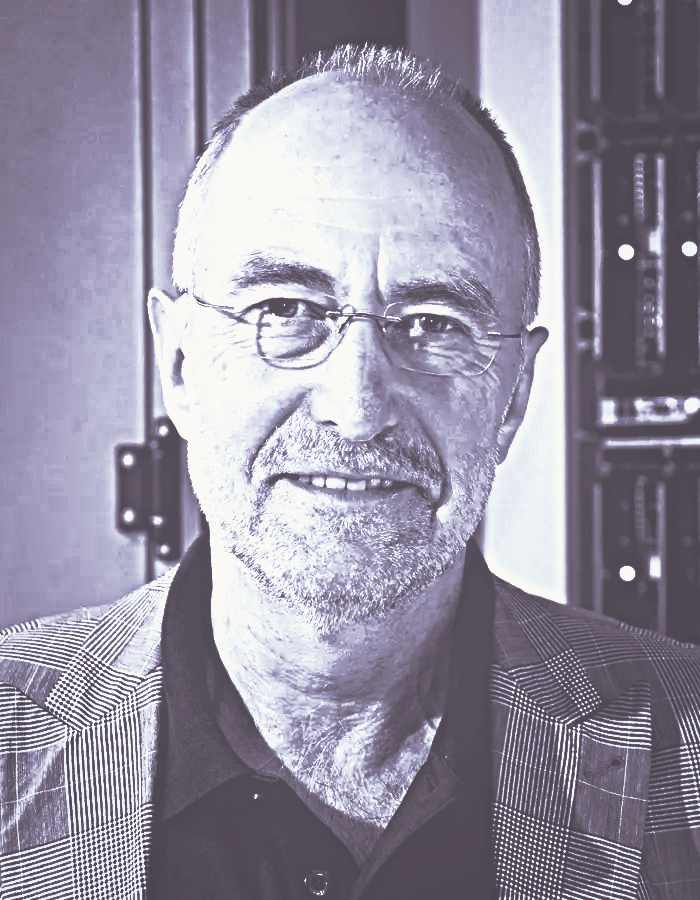
- Born: Theo Geisel; August 24, 1948 (age 78); Limburg an der Lahn, Hesse Germany
- Other name: Prof. Theo Geisel
- Education: University of Frankfurt; University of Regensburg
- Scientific career
- Workplaces: University of Regensburg; University of Würzburg; University of Frankfurt; University of Göttingen; Max Planck Institute for Dynamics and Self-Organization
- Thesis: Theorie der Ramanstreuung in den Ammoniumhalogeniden (1976)
- Doctoral advisor: Joachim Keller
- Doctoral students: Dirk Brockmann; Viola Priesemann

Dr. Theo Geisel (born 24 August 1948 in Limburg an der Lahn, Hesse) is a German physicist. Geisel is a director at the Max Planck Institute for Dynamics and Self-Organization and professor of theoretical physics at the University of Göttingen. His research is primarily concerned with the behavior of complex systems ranging from theoretical investigations in quantum chaos to nonlinear phenomena occurring in the brain.

== Biography ==
Geisel studied physics in Frankfurt and Regensburg. After graduating from the University of Regensburg in 1975, he worked as Post-Doc at the Max Planck Institute for Solid State Research in Stuttgart (1976–77) and at the Xerox Palo Alto Research Center (1978–79). In 1980, he returned to Regensburg as assistant professor. During 1983-87 he worked as a Heisenberg fellow, later he became professor for theoretical physics at the University of Würzburg (1988–89) and the University of Frankfurt (1989–96). During this time, he was awarded the prestigious Gottfried Wilhelm Leibniz Prize. Since 1996, he has been professor for theoretical physics at the University of Göttingen and Director of the Max Planck Institute for Dynamics and Self-Organization. He is chairperson of the Bernstein Center for Computational Neuroscience (BCCN) Göttingen which he founded in 2005. Since 2013, Theo Geisel is member of the Göttingen Academy of Science, the oldest continually existing such institution in Germany.

=== Personal life ===
Geisel is also a classical and jazz musician and performs regularly on flute and saxophone. He has recorded a jazz album with the band August Stockinger's Flohzirkus.

== Main areas of research ==
Theo Geisel is known for fundamental research on nonlinear and stochastic dynamics with applications in a broad range of complex living and non-living systems. He is leading in transferring methods between fields, including randomly appearing motion known in chaos theory to solid state physics, pattern formation theory established for fluids to the analysis of neural circuits, the discovery of new mathematical objects called unstable attractors in neuronal models and recently concepts from the physics of nano-structures to the predictability of tsunami waves.

- Nonlinear dynamics
- Computational neuroscience
- Forecast of epidemics
- Lévy walks (anomalous diffusion)
- Dynamics of neuronal networks
- Development of cortical maps
- Neural synchronization
- Quantum chaos
- Semiconductor nanostructures

== Awards and fellowships ==
- Heisenberg Fellow of the Deutsche Forschungsgemeinschaft (German Research Foundation) 1983
- Gottfried Wilhelm Leibniz Prize 1994
- Fellow of the American Physical Society 2008
- Gentner-Kastler Prize 2009

== Editorial boards ==
- Physical Review Letters (Divisional Associate Editor for Biological Physics)
- Chaos - Interdisciplinary Journal of Nonlinear Science (American Institute of Physics)
