= Currency bill tracking =

Process of tracking the movements of banknotes

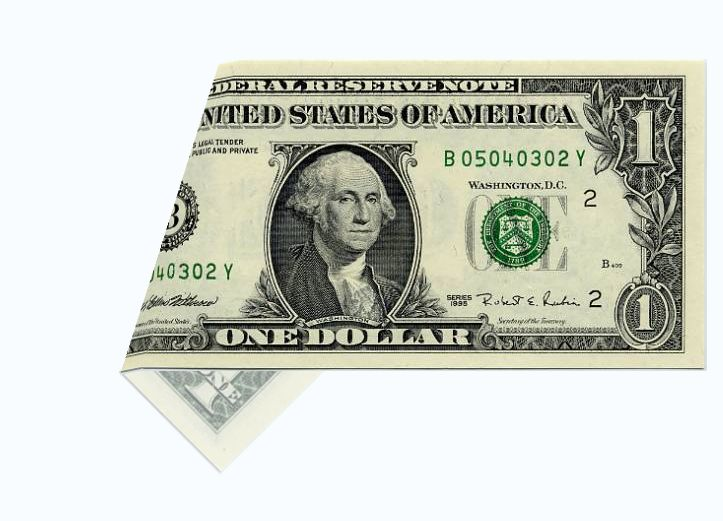
USD 1 banknote (Dollar bill)

Currency bill tracking is the process of tracking the movements of banknotes, similar to how ornithologists track migrations of birds by ringing them. It is usually facilitated by any one of a number of websites set up for the purpose, which can track currency among the users of that website. A user may register a bill by entering its serial number, and if someone else has already registered the bill, then the "route" of the bill can be displayed.

Some bill tracking sites encourage marking a bill before spending it, whereas others do not. This usually depends on the laws of the country issuing the currency.

The most popular currencies for currency tracking are the euro, the United States dollar (USD), and the Canadian dollar (CAD).

== Background and legal status ==
Originally beginning in the United States in December 1998 with the launch of Where's George? by software developer and database consultant Hank Eskin, the phenomenon or hobby of currency tracking quickly spread to first to Canada which made its own currency tracker "Where's Willy?" and then beyond. Especially with the Euro bill tracking, trackers have taken on a much more competitive nature and have formed communities within their respective sites. Many successful sites incorporate some sort of social media, either through site specific unique techniques, or through outside popular social media sites. In the Eurozone because multiple countries having adopted the Euro, this easily leads to competition between trackers in different countries; in the United States competition plays out at the state or county level; and in Canada, at the provincial level.

Marking bills in Canada with ink or rubber stamp is not illegal. In the United States, marking bills is illegal if there is intent to render the bill "unfit to be re-issued"; however, this is rarely enforced and only a fine is faced, if convicted. Marking is widespread in both countries. In the Eurozone marking is not universal, and varies by region. The European Central Bank considers the marking of bills (as well as the destruction of them) to be legal and not exclusive to governments.

== Popular currency bill tracking websites ==
Some of the most popular websites for bill tracking include the following:

=== North America ===
- Where's George?, started in December 1998.
- Where's Willy? for CAD (Canada).

=== Europe ===
- EuroBillTracker was started on January 1, 2002, to track euro banknotes. It is the largest of the euro tracking sites.

=== Oceania ===
- The Money Tracker, started in March 2006, tracks Australian dollars and has similar functionality to Where's George.

=== Asia ===
- WheresRupee is a web-based tracking platform for tracing the movement of Indian rupee (INR) currency notes. It allows users to log serial numbers and view geographic history with map visualizations.

=== Former ===
- DoshTracker, launched in 2001 and relaunched in 2012, allows pound sterling banknotes to be tracked around the United Kingdom and abroad. Went defunct by 2018.

== In popular culture ==
The act of tracking a $20 bill was the binding theme between various stories in the film Twenty Bucks.

A similar scheme to currency bill tracking – and said to be inspired by it – is BookCrossing, which tracks the movement of secondhand books which are marked and then "released into the wild".

In one episode of the Czechoslovak comic series Rychlé šípy, the boy club releases a marked 1 crown coin and then they track the coin through Czechoslovakia.

== See also ==
- Geocaching
- Letterboxing
- Postcrossing
