= Kleinschwarzenbach =

Bavarian village

- Village
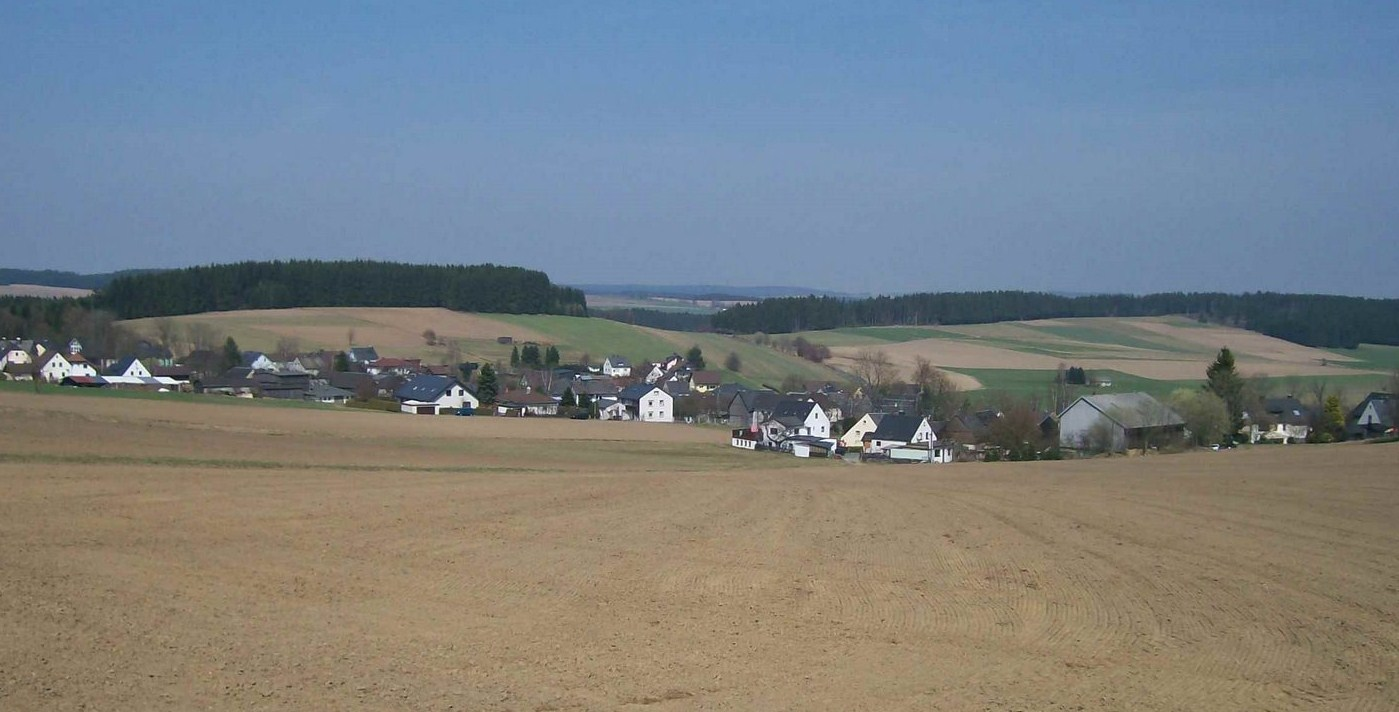
- Interactive map of Kleinschwarzenbach
- Coordinates: 50°14′49″N 11°42′21″E
- Country: Germany
- State: Bavaria
- District: Hof
- Town: Helmbrechts

Kleinschwarzenbach is a village in the German city of Helmbrechts. Dr. Seuss visited members of the Seuss family there to rediscover his heritage.
