= Ruth Elfriede Hildner =

Nazi concentration camp guard (1919–1947)

- Born: 1 November 1919; Nuremberg, Germany
- Died: 2 May 1947 (aged 27); Písek, Czechoslovakia
- Cause of death: Execution by hanging
- Occupation: Guard at several Nazi concentration camps during World War II

Ruth Elfriede Hildner (1 November 1919 – 2 May 1947) was a guard at several Nazi concentration camps during World War II.

Hildner was conscripted into camp service in July 1944, arriving at Ravensbrück concentration camp to be trained as a camp matron. Hildner, 24 years old, entered the Dachau concentration camp in September 1944 as an Aufseherin. Next she was sent to an Agfa Camera Werke-connected subcamp at Munich; she eventually served in several subcamps, including Hennigsdorf, Wittenberg and Haselhorst. In December 1944, she arrived at Helmbrechts, a tiny subcamp of Flossenbürg located near Hof, Germany. There, she was feared by the camp's inmates, both Jews and non-Jews.

In April 1945, the guards at the small camp evacuated the women in the face of the U.S. Army. Hildner was one of several guards on the death march who took part in mistreatment and murder of several young girls with her baton. She also accompanied the march into Zwodau, another subcamp of Flossenbürg, located in Czechoslovakia. Several days later, the march departed for western Czechoslovakia. In early May 1945, the SS men and female overseers fled the march site. Hildner melted into the hordes of refugees, escaping temporarily, but was recognized by Czechoslovak police in March 1947, arrested, and put in prison.

== Trial and execution ==
On 2 May 1947, aged 27, she was tried in the Extraordinary People's Court in Písek, Czechoslovakia, found guilty of war crimes and hanged the same day.

== See also ==
- Female guards in Nazi concentration camps
