= Max Planck Institute for Dynamics and Self-Organization =

Research institute for investigations of complex non-equilibrium systems

- Founder: Ludwig Prandtl
- Established: 1924
- Formerly called: Kaiser Wilhelm Institute for Flow Research
- Location: Göttingen, Germany
- Website: www.ds.mpg.de/en

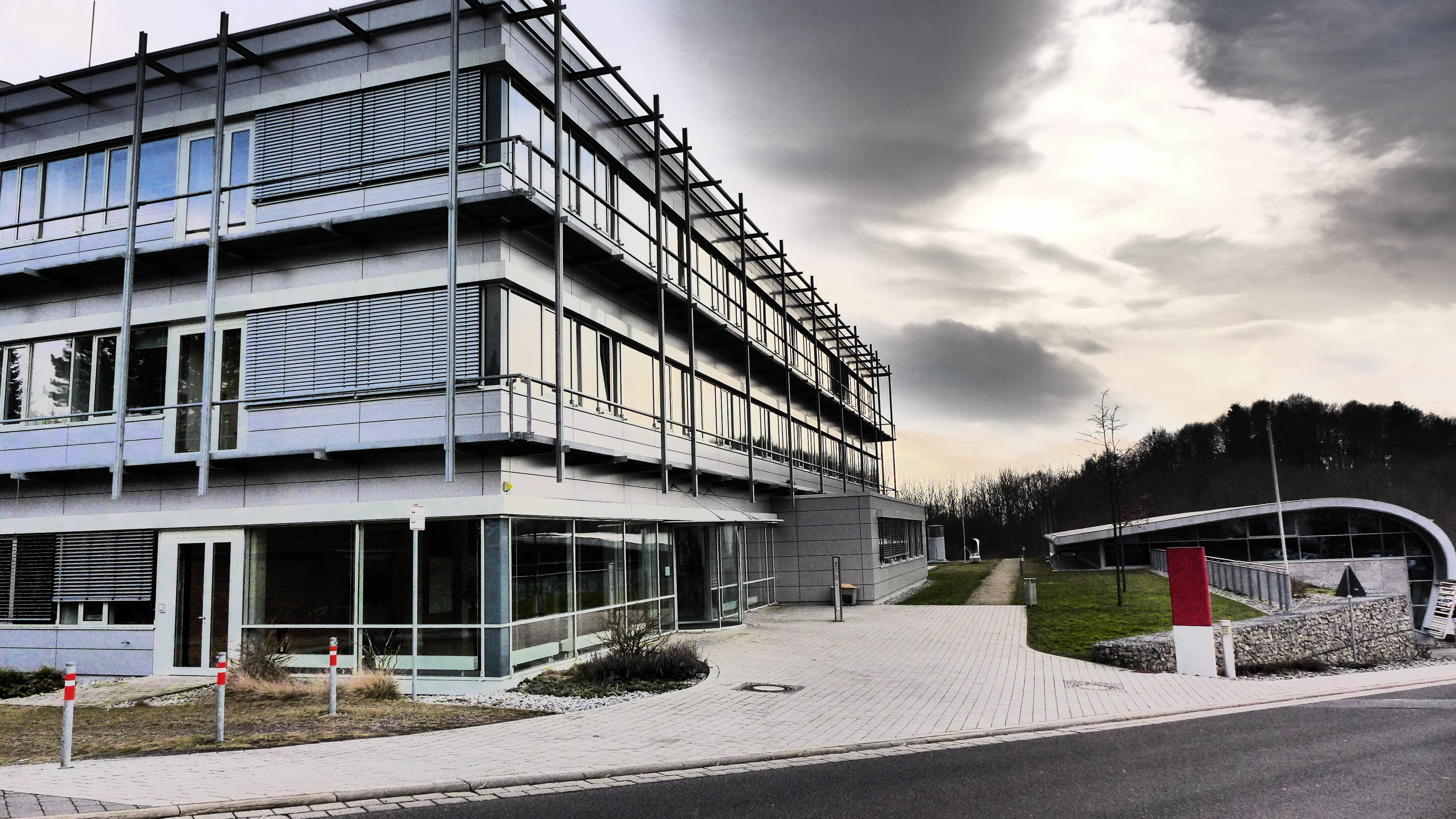
Max Planck Institute for Dynamics and Self-Organization

The Max Planck Institute for Dynamics and Self-Organization in Göttingen, Germany, is a research institute for investigations of complex non-equilibrium systems, particularly in physics and biology.

Its founding history goes back to Ludwig Prandtl who in 1911 requested a Kaiser Wilhelm Institute to be founded for the investigation of aerodynamics and hydrodynamics. As a first step the Aeronautische Versuchsanstalt (now the DLR) was established in 1915 and then finally the Kaiser Wilhelm Institute for Flow Research was established in 1924. In 1948 it became part of the Max Planck Society. The Max Planck Society was founded in this institute. In 2003 it was renamed to Max Planck Institute for Dynamics and Self-Organization. It is one of 80 institutes in the Max Planck Society (Max Planck Gesellschaft).

== History ==
The early history of the Max Planck Institute for Dynamics and Self-Organization is closely linked to the work of the famous physicist Ludwig Prandtl. Prandtl is regarded as the founder of fluid dynamics and especially made a name for himself with his boundary layer theory. In Göttingen Prandtl opened two research facilities that both exist until today: in 1915 the Aerodynamical Experimental Station, which concentrated on application-oriented topics in fluid dynamics and evolved into the Göttinger branch of the German Space Agency DLR, and in 1925 the Kaiser Wilhelm Institute for Fluid Dynamics. The latter mainly dealt with fundamental research in the field of fluid dynamics. After the Max Planck Society was founded the institute was renamed Max Planck Institute for Fluid Dynamics. In 2004 the institute again received a new name and is now called Max Planck Institute for Dynamics and Self-Organization.

=== The early years ===
In 1904 Ludwig Prandtl accepted a position as professor for Technical Physics at the University of Göttingen. Here he continued his research in fluid dynamics that he had started as professor in Hannover. One of his experimental setups was a water channel, into which different obstacles could be inserted. Soon however, Prandtl wished to conduct more application-oriented research in larger test facilities. This became possible in 1907 with the foundation of an experimental facility in the Hildebrandt Street. Here Prandtl built the first German wind tunnel and thereby established the so-called "Göttinger type" of wind tunnels. Unlike those created by Gustav Eiffel in France wind tunnels of the Göttinger type feature a closed cycle for the liquids or gases to flow in. The founding of this experimental facility is the starting point of the later Aerodynamical Experimental Station.

When on January 11, 1911, the Kaiser Wilhelm Society, the preceding organisation of the Max Planck Society, was founded in Berlin, Prandtl acted again. Only one month later he appealed to the new organisation in a memorandum. In it he asked for an institute for fundamental research in fluid dynamics to be built in Göttingen. As reasons for his choice of location he listed his own previous research and the high esteem of mathematics at the University of Göttingen.

The following negotiations lasted for over a decade and were interrupted by World War I. The Kaiser Wilhelm Institute for Fluid Dynamics was not opened until 1925. It was located on the premises between Böttinger and Bunsen Street, where it is still found today. Ludwig Prandtl was appointed head of the institute. Before, in 1915 the application-oriented Aerodynamical Experimental Station had been founded at the same location. The wind tunnel that Prandtl had built in the Hildebrandt Street was moved to the Bunsen Street in 1918. With the foundation of the Kaiser Wilhelm Institute both the new institute and the Aerodynamical Experimental Station were united under the name "Kaiser Wilhelm Institute for Fluid Dynamics together with the Aerodynamical Experimental Station".

=== After World War II ===
On April 11, 1945, the British military government temporarily closed the Kaiser-Wilhelm-Institute and the Aerodynamical Experimental Station and installed a committee to decide about the future of both research facilities. In June a decision was made: The Aerodynamical Experimental Station was permanently closed and its experiments were disassembled. Having been built for the purpose of fundamental research only, the Kaiser Wilhelm Institute was permitted to carry on its work and was reopened on August 1, 1946. In the same year Ludwig Prandtl resigned as head of the institute. His successor was Albert Betz, who had led the Aerodynamical Experimental Station for years.

When in February 1948 the Max Planck Society was founded in Göttingen, the institute became part of this new organisation and was renamed Max Planck Institute for Fluid Dynamics. In 1953 the Aerodynamical Experimental Station was reopened as part of the Max Planck Society. In 1969 the Experimental Station was separated from the institute and became a predecessor of the German Space Agency DLR.

=== Fluid dynamics and more ===
Also in 1969 the Max Planck Institute began to focus on new fields of research and received three departments for molecular physics: Atomic and Molecular Physics, Molecular Interactions and Reaction Kinetics. In the following years this field of research became more and more important until in 1993 the institute discontinued all research in fluid dynamics.

In 1996 the institute again chose a new research focus and appointed Prof. Dr. Theo Geisel, who opened the Department of Nonlinear Dynamics. By 2001 all departments dealing with molecular physics had been closed. With the appointment of Prof. Dr. Stephan Herminghaus and Prof. Dr. Eberhard Bodenschatz in 2003 and the founding of the Department of Dynamics of Complex Fluids and the Department of Hydrodynamics, Pattern Formation and Nanonbiocomplexity fluid dynamics returned to the institute. However, now this field of research was put into the larger context of self-organized and nonlinear phenomena. This development led to the renaming of the institute on November 19, 2004. Since then the institute is called Max Planck Institute for Dynamics and Self-Organization.

=== Important dates ===
1907: Ludwig Prandtl builds the first German wind tunnel in Göttingen

1915: The Kaiser Wilhelm Society founds the Aerodynamical Experimental Station on the premises between Böttinger and Bunsen Street

1925: The Kaiser Wilhelm Institute for Fluid Dynamics is opened at the same location and united with the Aerodynamical Experimental Station

1945: The British military government shuts down both research facilities

August 1, 1946: The Kaiser Wilhelm Institute is reopened

1948: The institute becomes part of the Max Planck Society

1969: The institute receives three departments focused on molecular physics

1993: The last department working in fluid dynamics is closed

1996: Prof. Dr. Theo Geisel is appointed and opens the Department of Nonlinear Dynamics

2001: The last department in molecular physics is closed

2003: Prof. Eberhard Bodenschatz and Prof. Stephan Herminghaus are appointed and open the Department of Hydrodynamics, Pattern Formation and Nanobiocomplexity and the Department of Dynamics of Complex Fluids

November 19, 2004: The institute is renamed Max Planck Institute for Dynamics and Self-Organization

2017: Department of Nonlinear Dynamics is closed

2018: Prof. Ramin Golestanian is appointed director and opened Department of Living Matter Physics

2023: The Department of the Dynamics of Complex Fluids is closed with the retirement of Prof. Stephan Herminghaus

July 16, 2025: 100th anniversary of the institute

== Departments and independent research groups ==
The research conducted at the Max Planck Institute for Dynamics and Self-Organization covers a broad spectrum, mainly in the physics of complex systems. Recently, the physics of complex systems has become a topic of increasing interest and includes open systems, which are characterized by dissipation of energy and entropy production. Pattern forming systems are particularly interesting, and the understanding of the general features are the topic of current research. Hydrodynamic turbulence is another example and continues to be one of the unsolved problems of the 21st century. These systems are mostly deterministic, and the influence of thermal fluctuations can be neglected. However, this does not include living nature. Biological systems have active components (genetic networks, protein networks, molecular motors, neurons), which consist of discrete units (i. e. cells) and require the consideration of stochastic processes (thermal noise). Moreover, for the molecular transport and fluid dynamics on scales smaller than micrometres the molecular structure of the fluid may become important. This is especially true for complex fluids, whose properties are determined by mesoscale Coulomb interactions and the presence of large molecules.

=== Departments ===
The Max Planck Institute for Dynamics and Self-Organization currently encompasses 2 departments:

- Prof. Eberhard Bodenschatz - Fluid Physics, Pattern Formation and Biocomplexity
- Prof. Ramin Golestanian - Living Matter Physics

=== Research groups ===
The institute is particularly engaged in the support of junior scientists, which is indicated by the numerous Max Planck Research Groups that it hosts.

- Dr. Claudia Brunner - Turbulence and Wind Energy
- Dr. Sarah Loos - Statistical Physics Beyond Equilibrium
- Prof. Dr. Stefan Luther - Biomedical Physics
- Prof. Dr. Viola Priesemann - Complex Systems Theory
- PD Dr. Olga Shishkina - Theory of Turbulent Convection
- Prof. Dr. Fred Wolf - Dynamics of Biological Networks
- Dr. David Zwicker - Theory of Biological Fluids

=== Emeritus groups ===
- Prof. Jan-Peter Toennies - Molecular Interactions
- Prof. Theo Geisel - Nonlinear Dynamics
- Prof. Stephan Herminghaus - Social Systems Dynamics
