= EuroBillTracker =

Web service for tracking Euro notes

- Available in: English, and others
- Website: eurobilltracker.com
- Commercial: No
- Launched: 2002; 24 years ago
- Current status: Online

EuroBillTracker (EBT) is a website designed for tracking euro banknotes. It was inspired by the US currency bill tracking website Where's George? The aim is to record as many notes as possible to know details about their distribution and movements, follow it up, like where a note has been seen in particular, and generate statistics and rankings, for example, in which countries there are more tickets. EuroBillTracker has registered over 243 million notes with a combined total value of more than €4.4 billion as of February 2026.

== Characteristics ==
EuroBillTracker is an international non-profit volunteer team dedicated to tracking euro notes around the world. The site is made up of people who simply enter the information from the notes in their possession. Each user enters the serial numbers and location information for each note they obtain into EuroBillTracker. A user can then see any comments from other people who have had that note. From this information, the site extracts:

- Diffusion information: Each euro country has its own range of note serial numbers and from this information EBT can generate diffusion graphs that tell us how the notes travel to other countries. See the Diffusion section for more information.
- Tracking information: When a note is re-entered, the users who previously entered it are notified via email. These hits can be seen in the statistics section.
- Statistics and rankings: Who enters the most notes, which are the top countries? Where are the notes currently situated?

Euro banknotes and coins were put into circulation on 1 January 2002 and EBT has been tracking notes since then. The site was initially created by Philippe Girolami (giro). Anssi Johansson (avij) has been assisting with running the site since mid-2003. Site translation and various other tasks are handled by a group of active EBT users.

EuroBillTracker is not affiliated with the European Union, European Central Bank, national central banks or other financial institutions. Using EBT is completely free. Unlike Where's George?, EuroBillTracker requires users to register an account before they can enter details of banknotes.

From February 2008 onwards, the website is supposed to be run by a non-profit organization based in France, and called the European Society for EuroBillTrackers or Association des Eurobilltrackers. This organisation, operating generally similar to the Wikimedia Foundation, will be in charge of protecting the EuroBillTracker database and ensuring it is free of charge. Proceedings for the founding of the association are under way as of January 2008; they were launched after disagreements between the founder of the website and other webmasters caused a split of EuroBillTracker into two different sites on 24 December 2007. The two sites reunited in early 2008.

== Statistical facts ==
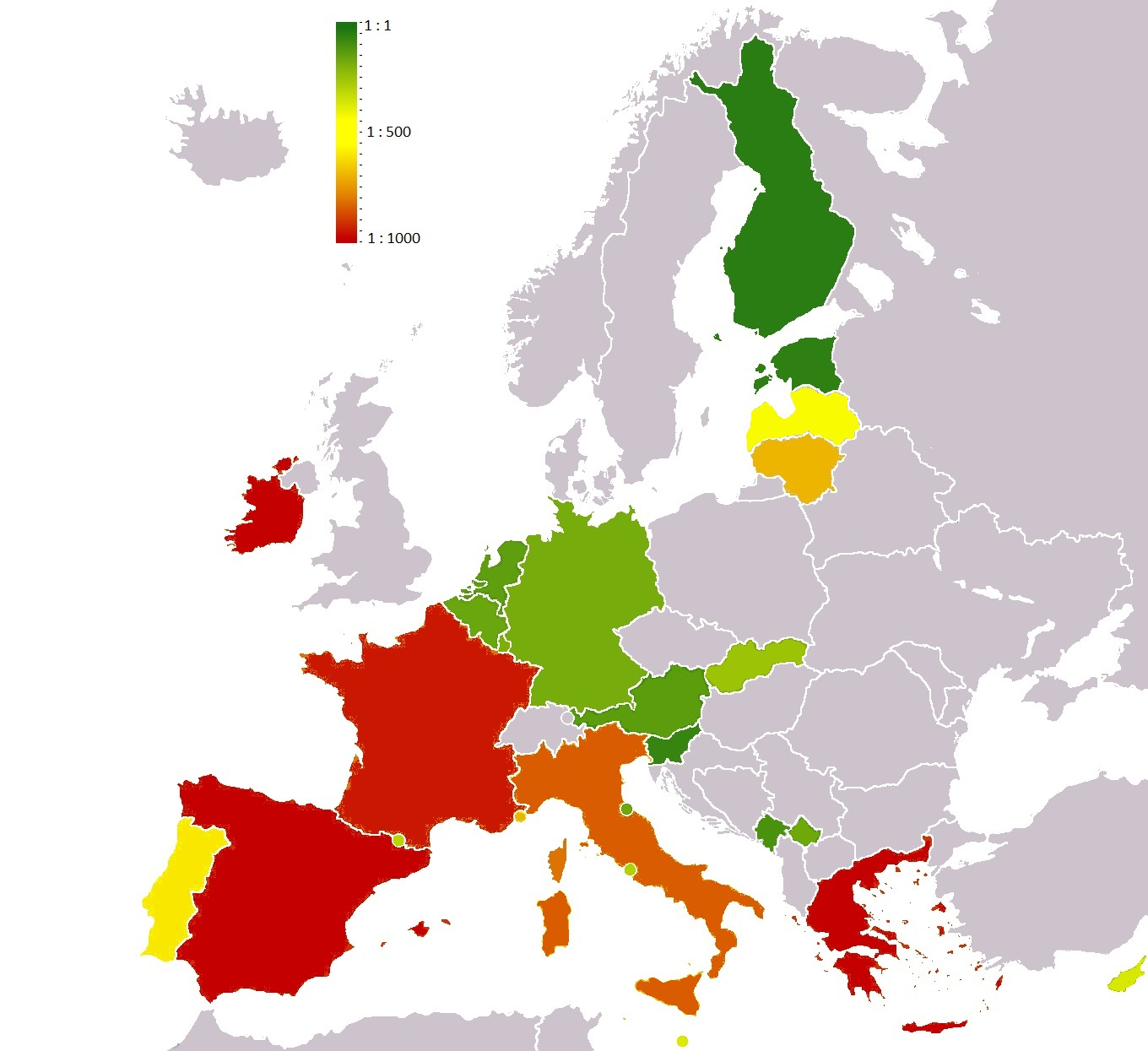
A map of Eurozone countries according to their EBT hit ratio, i.e. the ratio between the number of banknotes registered at least two times and the total number of banknotes entered in a country. Green represents a higher ratio.

=== Core figures ===
As of 11 November 2025:

- Number of users: over 227,000
- Number of banknotes: over 240,600,000
- Total value of all notes: over €4,400,000,000
- Number of interesting hits: over 1,391,000
- Number of bills by country:

	Inventoried banknotes per year								
Country	2015	2016	2017	2018	2019	2020	2021	2022	2023
Andorra	869	811	271	1,112	306	148	177	331	328
Austria	1,225,403	1,137,506	1,161,059	1,220,528	1,210,956	1,218,951	1,293,967	1,409,088	1,455,981
Belgium	1,793,210	1,573,113	1,344,476	1,156,809	925,171	625,024	576,298	582,592	549,726
Bulgaria	356	562	328	548	625	262	257	623	620
Croatia	1,737	2,096	1,415	1,176	1,419	738	882	1,562	28,425
Cyprus	9,472	2,922	1,125	2,457	1,449	691	927	1,111	1,976
(Czech Republic) Czechia	4,371	5,727	4,538	7,056	5,427	3,806	4,123	4,395	2,482
Denmark	1,495	1,336	1,634	3,114	1,924	239	847	395	620
Estonia	142,842	165,738	152,274	135,889	77,147	50,547	29,019	25,628	24,014
Finland	1,168,811	1,005,890	839,943	678,850	611,413	471,090	409,552	403,080	372,581
France	638,701	570,728	451,130	429,167	401,320	328,495	327,687	342,236	715,083
Germany	4,215,049	3,970,351	3,298,151	3,009,504	3,127,612	2,782,818	2,897,620	2,918,582	2,986,853
Greece	115,004	99,217	69,496	32,664	20,401	19,307	14,887	24,593	47,436
Hungary	1,112	704	840	1,986	1,456	691	527	2,146	3,079
(Republic of Ireland) Ireland	128,210	153,314	128,223	107,285	83,260	43,053	49,598	50,907	50,799
Italy	656,070	823,571	837,546	768,989	780,345	563,210	611,701	581,571	553,757
Latvia	44,425	49,598	34,989	34,270	35,937	21,349	19,620	20,143	21,310
Lithuania	79,845	106,444	155,096	215,000	235,657	206,462	206,917	208,825	216,495
Luxembourg	22,693	8,868	8,383	8,494	11,383	11,472	11,112	11,761	12,732
Malta	75,163	74,851	59,324	93,800	63,497	54,237	69,605	46,830	38,102
Monaco	19,141	14,719	6,907	910	213	184	202	186	1,970
Netherlands	853,235	738,099	713,575	624,300	558,656	403,658	364,908	340,216	329,102
Poland	6,180	5,304	5,752	4,513	3,395	2,018	1,841	1,540	3,086
Portugal	359,881	372,261	378,756	411,736	349,236	274,417	339,274	404,141	382,513
Romania	2,189	1,148	1,295	1,419	2,885	1,775	2,088	3,416	2,818
San Marino	131	151	260	447	294	125	181	124	103
Slovakia	98,997	124,420	110,501	89,593	92,701	85,748	122,424	109,124	126,567
Slovenia	332,188	275,503	226,141	173,859	125,962	112,847	89,194	98,990	98,229
Spain	384,476	378,765	333,951	279,585	257,200	196,947	284,144	352,653	443,943
Sweden	1,292	1,271	1,470	1,595	2,674	1,397	581	985	937
Vatican City	138	189	151	185	152	29	45	82	116

=== Number of banknotes entered (history) ===
Since the introduction of the Euro in 2002, the EuroBillTracker had its peak in 2009. From 2009, the following 10 years registered a decreasing of Euro bills introduced. The lull observed from 2019 to 2022 can be explained by the COVID-19 pandemic movement restrictions, which caused a decrease of entered banknotes in those years.

Year	Number of Banknotes Entered
2002	531,072
2003	1,016,350
2004	3,320,821
2005	7,374,560
2006	10,843,152
2007	13,703,089
2008	14,820,569
2009	16,184,977
2010	15,163,651
2011	14,703,449
2012	14,217,909
2013	13,658,971
2014	13,008,377
2015	12,462,982
2016	11,769,011
2017	10,410,226
2018	9,583,954
2019	9,096,204
2020	7,531,961
2021	7,775,115
2022	8,005,017
2023	8,538,095
2024	8,839,257
2025	9,495,039

=== Ranking of Euro banknotes introduced per location (history) ===
Location rankings by the total of Euro banknotes introduced
Rank	2025	2026	Change
1	(Austria) Vienna	(Austria) Vienna	→
2	(Germany) Berlin	(Germany) Berlin	→
3	(Germany) Hagen	(Austria) Klagenfurt	▲1
4	(Austria) Klagenfurt	(Germany) Hagen	▼1
5	(Germany) Nuremberg	(Germany) Nuremberg	→
6	(Finland) Helsinki	(Finland) Helsinki	→
7	(Netherlands) Groningen	(Austria) Graz	▲1
8	(Austria) Graz	(Netherlands) Groningen	▼1
9	(Germany) Düsseldorf	(Germany) Düsseldorf	→
10	(Germany) Helmbrechts	(Germany) Helmbrechts	→

=== Ranking of Hits per location (history) ===
Location rankings by the total of Hits
Rank	2025	2026	Change
1	(Austria) Vienna	(Austria) Vienna	→
2	(Finland) Helsinki	(Finland) Helsinki	→
3	(Germany) Helmbrechts	(Germany) Helmbrechts	→
4	(Finland) Kouvola	(Austria) Graz	▲1
5	(Austria) Graz	(Finland) Kouvola	▼1
6	(Austria) Klagenfurt	(Austria) Klagenfurt	→
7	(Germany) Berlin	(Germany) Berlin	→
8	(Finland) Tampere	(Finland) Tampere	→
9	(Netherlands) Groningen	(Netherlands) Groningen	→
10	(Germany) Hagen	(Germany) Hagen	→

== Community ==
The growing popularity of EuroBillTracker has led to the development of a community of trackers, especially in countries with a higher usage of the website, such as Finland, the Benelux countries and Slovenia. On the contrary, the percentage of users with respect to the national population is especially low in some south European countries such as France, Spain or Greece, and also in Ireland.

Since 2004, the community has been organising a pan-European yearly meeting during summer. After the 2008 meeting in Ljubljana, the EBT users also decided to organise a winter pan-European meeting.

Year	Winter	Summer
2004		(Belgium) Brussels
2005		(Finland) Helsinki
2006		(Netherlands) Amsterdam
2007		(Germany) Berlin
2008		(Slovenia) Ljubljana
2009	(Italy) Bologna and Ferrara	(Austria) Vienna
2010	Malta	(Italy) Florence and Prato
2011	(Germany) Kalkar	(Spain) Barcelona
2012	(Germany) Frankfurt am Main + ECB	(Germany) Munich
2013	(France) Rouen	(Netherlands) Rotterdam
2014	(Portugal) Lisbon	(Finland) Turku
2015	(Cyprus) Larnaca	(Belgium) Brussels and Antwerp
2016	(Republic of Ireland) Dublin	(Malta) Sliema
2017		(Finland) Helsinki
2018	(Spain) Murcia	(Lithuania) Vilnius
2019	(Germany) Munich	(France) Lille
2026		(Germany) Nuremberg

- The 2026 meeting took place in Nuremberg during the weekend of 22 August, after the last meeting organized in 2019.

Curiosities:

- The Winter Meeting in 2010 was the first where the name of the country was attributed to the meeting instead of the host city;
- The city of (Germany) Frankfurt am Main was the host of the Winter 2012 Meeting, where the 10th Anniversary of EuroBillTracker was celebrated;
- After many years without a Meeting (interrupted due to the COVID-19 pandemic), a Yearly meeting was organized in 2026;

Apart from the yearly meeting, national communities have been organising local gatherings at various levels; most notably, the German-speaking community was once hosted at the European Central Bank headquarters in Frankfurt am Main in April 2007. The visit was repeated in April 2012, during an international meeting.

== Notes ==
There was no Winter Meeting in 2017 because the only host that applied to organize the event did it outside of the deadline date.

== See also ==
- Currency bill tracking
- Where's Willy? (tracks Canadian paper money)
