= Cashback =

Cashback may refer to:

- Cashback (film), two films directed by Sean Ellis
- Cashback reward program, a small amount paid to a customer by a credit card company for each use of a credit card
- Cashback website, a site where customers can earn cash rebates on online purchases that they make
- Debit card cashback, cash that shoppers receive along with their goods when paying by debit card
- Mortgage cashback, a lump sum given to a new borrower at the beginning of a mortgage term

== See also ==
- Rebate (marketing), a sales promotion where customers receive money back after a purchase
- Loyalty program, a discount scheme used by retailers
