= Twenty Bucks =

- Theatrical Release Poster
- Directed by: Keva Rosenfeld
- Written by: Leslie Bohem; Endre Bohem
- Produced by: Karen Murphy
- Starring: Linda Hunt; Brendan Fraser; Elisabeth Shue; Steve Buscemi; Christopher Lloyd; Diane Baker; Spalding Gray
- Cinematography: Emmanuel Lubezki
- Edited by: Michael Ruscio
- Music by: David Robbins
- Production company: Big Tomorrow Productions
- Distributed by: Triton Pictures
- Release date: October 22, 1993; (United States)
- Running time: 91 minutes
- Country: United States
- Language: English

Twenty Bucks is a 1993 American comedy-drama film directed by Keva Rosenfeld and starring Linda Hunt, Brendan Fraser, Gladys Knight, Elisabeth Shue, Steve Buscemi, Christopher Lloyd, William H. Macy, David Schwimmer, Shohreh Aghdashloo and Spalding Gray. The film follows the travels of a $20 bill from its delivery via armored car in an unnamed American city through various transactions and incidents from person to person.

For his performance, Christopher Lloyd won the Independent Spirit Award for Best Supporting Male in 1994.

== Plot ==
An armored truck brings money to load an ATM. A woman withdraws $20 but the bill slips away. A homeless woman, Angeline, grabs the bill and reads the serial number, proclaiming that it is her destiny to win the lottery with those numbers. As she holds the bill, a boy grabs the bill from her and uses it at a bakery. The baker sells an expensive pair of figurines for a wedding cake to Jack Holiday and gives him the bill as change. At the rehearsal dinner for the upcoming wedding of Sam Mastrewski to Anna Holiday, Jack reminisces about exchanging his foreign money for American currency when he first came to America, and he presents Sam with the $20 bill as a wedding present. Sam is taken aback by the perceived cheapness of his father-in-law-to-be, but is quickly "kidnapped" for his bachelor party, where he decides to spend the bill to pay the party's stripper. Anna shows up to explain that the $20 was not the entire present and suggests that Sam frame it to show that he understands its significance. Sam is unable to explain the absence of the bill, when the stripper comes in from the fire escape to offer it back to him. Anna apparently breaks the engagement.

The stripper uses the $20 bill to buy a herbal remedy from Mrs. McCormac. Mrs. McCormac mails the bill to her grandson Bobby as a birthday present. Bobby goes to a convenience store where Frank and Jimmy are engaged in a string of robberies. During their spree, they prevent Angeline from buying a lottery ticket at a liquor store. Not knowing he's a robber, Bobby gives Jimmy the bill to buy him some wine, as he can't buy it himself because he's underage. Jimmy goes into the store to find that Frank has botched the robbery. Jimmy and Frank leave, giving Bobby and his girlfriend Peggy champagne. The police chase the robbers, who hide in a used car lot. After the police pass by, Jimmy and Frank split up the money, but when Frank sees the $20 Jimmy got from the kid, he assumes that Jimmy is holding out on him. Jimmy tries to explain but Frank pulls a shotgun on him. Jimmy shoots Frank and takes all the money they've stolen, but leaves the $20 bill. The bill, now stained with Frank's blood, winds up in the police evidence locker but falls into the wrong box.

Waitress and aspiring writer Emily Adams shows up at the police precinct with boyfriend Neil to claim a box of items the police recovered. The police officer unwittingly includes the $20 bill among the other items. After flying out of the box from the back seat of Emily's convertible, the bill floats around town, and is picked up by a homeless man who uses it to buy groceries. Angeline is again unable to buy a lottery ticket, this time due to a fault with the cashier's computer. The bill is given as change to a wealthy woman who uses it to snort cocaine off the back of her stretch limousine, although she leaves it on her car, where it is picked up by her drug dealer.

The drug dealer also runs a day camp for youth, and he puts the bill into a fish where it is caught by a teen who has it converted to quarters and uses them to call a phone sex hotline in a bowling alley. The bowling alley owner gives the bill to his lover and tells him to go out and have fun. The owner's lover then encounters Sam, who is loitering in a daze behind the bowling alley. Sam turns down an offer of the $20 bill, not knowing it is the cause of his downfall. The owner's lover then uses it to play bingo at a church. Emily's father, Bruce, also plays bingo and receives the bill as change before dying of a heart attack.

At the mortuary, the mortician gives the family Bruce's personal effects, including his wallet with the $20 bill. Emily eventually looks in the wallet and finds the $20 bill in the wallet together with a copy of her first published short story. Her mother Ruth explains that Bruce also wanted to be a writer. Emily decides to go to Europe. At the airport, she explains her decision to her brother Gary, and she melodramatically rips up the bill in front of him (Gary was a witness to one of Jimmy & Frank's robberies). Sam is also at the airport, waiting for a flight to Europe and having a drink with Jack, with the two clearing up the misunderstanding over the $20 bill on good terms. Sam finds a piece of the ripped up bill and uses it as a bookmark, but it falls out without him noticing it as Sam and Emily walk toward their gate, both striking up a conversation. A title reading "The End" is derailed by Angeline collecting pieces of the bill.

Angeline sits down at a coin-operated TV and patches the bill back together with adhesive tape. Just then, the lottery numbers are read, and to her dismay, they match the serial number of the bill. Bringing the taped bill with her to a bank, she asks if it is still any good. The teller explains that if there's more than 51% of the bill left, it is still valid, and hands Angeline a crisp new $20 bill. The homeless woman dramatically reads the serial number of the new bill and leaves the bank.

== Cast ==
- Linda Hunt as Angeline
- Brendan Fraser as Sam Mastrewski
- Shohreh Aghdashloo as Ghada Holiday
- George Morfogen as Jack Holiday
- Sam Jenkins as Anna Holiday
- Gladys Knight as Mrs. McCormac
- Rosemary Murphy as Aunt Dotty
- Concetta Tomei as Sam's Mother
- Melora Walters as Stripper / Funeral Director
- Elisabeth Shue as Emily Adams
- Steve Buscemi as Frank
- Christopher Lloyd as Jimmy
- Kamau Holloway as Bobby McCormac
- Matt Frewer as Receding Bingo Winner
- Spalding Gray as The Priest
- Jeremy Piven as Nervous Quick-Mart Clerk
- William H. Macy as Policeman
- David Schwimmer as Neil Campbell
- Diane Baker as Ruth Adams
- Alan North as Bruce Adams
- Kevin Kilner as Gary Adams

== Production ==
The film was based on a screenplay that was nearly 60 years old. It was originally written by Endre Bohem in 1935, but was never filmed; his son, Leslie, discovered it in the 1980s and revised it, modernizing the language and some of the plot. This version of the screenplay was then used for the film. (Note: "The story of Endre Boehm's original screenplay is almost as problematic as the fate of the $20 bill. He wrote this story in 1935. It gathered dust for more than half a century before he handed it to his son, Leslie, who read it, liked it, did a rewrite, and saw it into production.") The elder Bohem wrote his spec script soon after the release of If I Had a Million. (Note: "Passed from Hungarian émigré scenarist Endre Bohem to his son Leslie Bohem, who inherited and adapted the 1935 version in the early 1980s, the story began as a Hollywood spec script not long after If I Had a Million was released. If I Had a Million proved to be an influence on the elder Bohem, who felt a more relevant and plausible film for Depression-era audiences would focus on twenty rather than a million dollars. Though the unproduced script languished for decades, the updated rendering perceptively deconstructs economic disparities that could not have been addressed in the original.")

In one of the production featurettes, Rosenfeld says that the bills used in the production were figured into the production costs of the film. The producers obtained several bills with consecutive serial numbers, as well as "every thousandth bill" so that some bills would have the right first few digits of the serial number and others the right last few digits. The bills were then selectively damaged in specific ways as required by the script. When they were done with the bills, Rosenfeld says the bills were dropped into the petty cash fund money.

=== Filming locations ===
Most of the outdoor scenes were filmed in Minneapolis; the rest and nearly all of the indoor scenes were filmed in Los Angeles. The scene where Angeline captures the bill was filmed on North 4th Street in downtown Minneapolis, in front of Fire Station No. 10 (with traffic driving the wrong way for the movie). The scene where Angeline visits McCormac and McCormac mails the bill (and Jimmy and Frank meet) was filmed in the 1000 block of West Broadway in Minneapolis (now demolished). The supermarket scene was filmed at a Holiday Plus supermarket (now part of the Cub Foods chain) in suburban Minneapolis. The bill floats near the Mississippi River just above St. Anthony Falls; over the 3rd Avenue Bridge; and past the E-Z Stop gas station at 1624 Washington Ave. North. The Adams house was filmed on the Near North side of Minneapolis at 1802 Bryant Ave N near the E-Z Stop station. The final scene was filmed in an actual bank, Marquette Bank Minneapolis at 90 S. 6th Street, which is now a restaurant named Bank.

== Critical reception ==
While many critics saw the film as a series of uneven vignettes, Roger Ebert thought that "the very lightness of the premise gives the film a kind of freedom. We glimpse revealing moments in lives, instead of following them to one of those manufactured movie conclusions that pretends everything has been settled." Ebert was so engrossed by Christopher Lloyd's performance that he almost forgot about the film's title object, (Note: "Sometimes an actor will walk into a movie for 15 minutes or so, and show you such strength that you look at him altogether differently. That's what Lloyd does here ... He doesn't play the holdup man as a bad guy, but as a well-spoken, intelligent, logical, firm-minded character who has a chilling reserve. By the time his segment arrives at its unexpected conclusion, I was so absorbed, I'd basically forgotten about the 20 bucks and the rest of the movie.") and liked the movie as a whole while acknowledging its vignette construction.

Janet Maslin of The New York Times dubbed the film, "A charming, offbeat tale shaped whimsically by the hand of fate. Rosenfeld manages to take a premise that is all contrivance and make it seem natural, as if every bit of legal tender had such a colorful life." Ty Burr of Entertainment Weekly said "Rosenfeld impressively summons up the ghosts of Capra and Sturges while keeping this tale firmly in the here and now."

Rita Kempley of The Washington Post wrote, "Thanks to director Keva Rosenfeld, a documentary filmmaker, its story seems to come about serendipitously. The film's pace, bouncy as Lotto balls in a tank, adds to the lightheartedness of this surprisingly droll look at the cost of living." On Rotten Tomatoes, the film has an aggregated score of 75% based on 8 reviews.

=== Scholarly assessment ===
Film scholars have compared Twenty Bucks to other films and television shows which track a single object traded among various persons (such as Diamond Handcuffs, Tales of Manhattan, The Gun (1974), Dead Man's Gun (1997), The Red Violin, etc.). However, by emphasizing a ubiquitous object rather than a unique object (such as the auction-worthy violin in The Red Violin), this film "ushers the genre into heretofore unexplored territory."

== See also ==
- Currency bill tracking
- Where's George? - Collaborative website project tracking the movements of American banknotes
