= Where's George? =

US dollar note tracking website

- A screenshot taken from version 4.0 of the "Where's George?" website, 2007
- Website type: Money circulation tracker
- Available in: English
- Owner: Where's George? LLC
- Creator: Hank Eskin
- Website: http://www.wheresgeorge.com/
- Registration: Optional
- Launched: December 1998; 27 years ago
- Current status: Active

Where's George? is a website that tracks the natural geographic circulation of American paper money. Its popularity has led to the establishment of a number of other currency tracking websites and sites that track other objects, such as used books. Statistics generated by the website have been used in at least one research paper to study patterns of human travel in the United States.

== Overview ==
The site was established in December 1998 by Hank Eskin, a database consultant in Brookline, Massachusetts. Where's George? refers to George Washington, whose portrait appears on the $1 bill. In addition to the $1 bill, $2, $5, $10, $20, $50, and $100 denominations can be tracked. The $1 bill is by far the most popular denomination, accounting for over 70% of bills with "hits" (explained below), followed by $20 bills, and the $5 bill a close third.

As of February 10, 2026, more than 331,000,000 bills, with a total face value of more than $1.781 billion, have been entered into the site's database; the daily influx of bills was noted in August 2022 as about 16,000 new bills a day. To track a bill, users enter their local ZIP code, the serial number of the bill, and series designation of any US currency denomination. Users outside the US also can participate by using an extensive database of unique codes assigned to non-American locations, while users based in Canada are able to use their postcode to indicate the bill's location. Once a bill is registered, the site reports the time between sightings, the distance between sightings, and any comments from the finders (called "user notes"). The site does not track bills older than series 1963.

Where's George? is supported by advertising, sales of memorabilia, and by users who pay a fee for extra features. The "Friends of Where's George?" (FOG) program allows these users to access the website free of advertisements, access certain features others cannot, and refresh reports on the user's entered bills. The standard FOG costs $8/month, while FOG+ costs $13/month. Eskin states that the "Friends of Where's George?" program will always be optional and payment to use the site will always be at the individual's option.

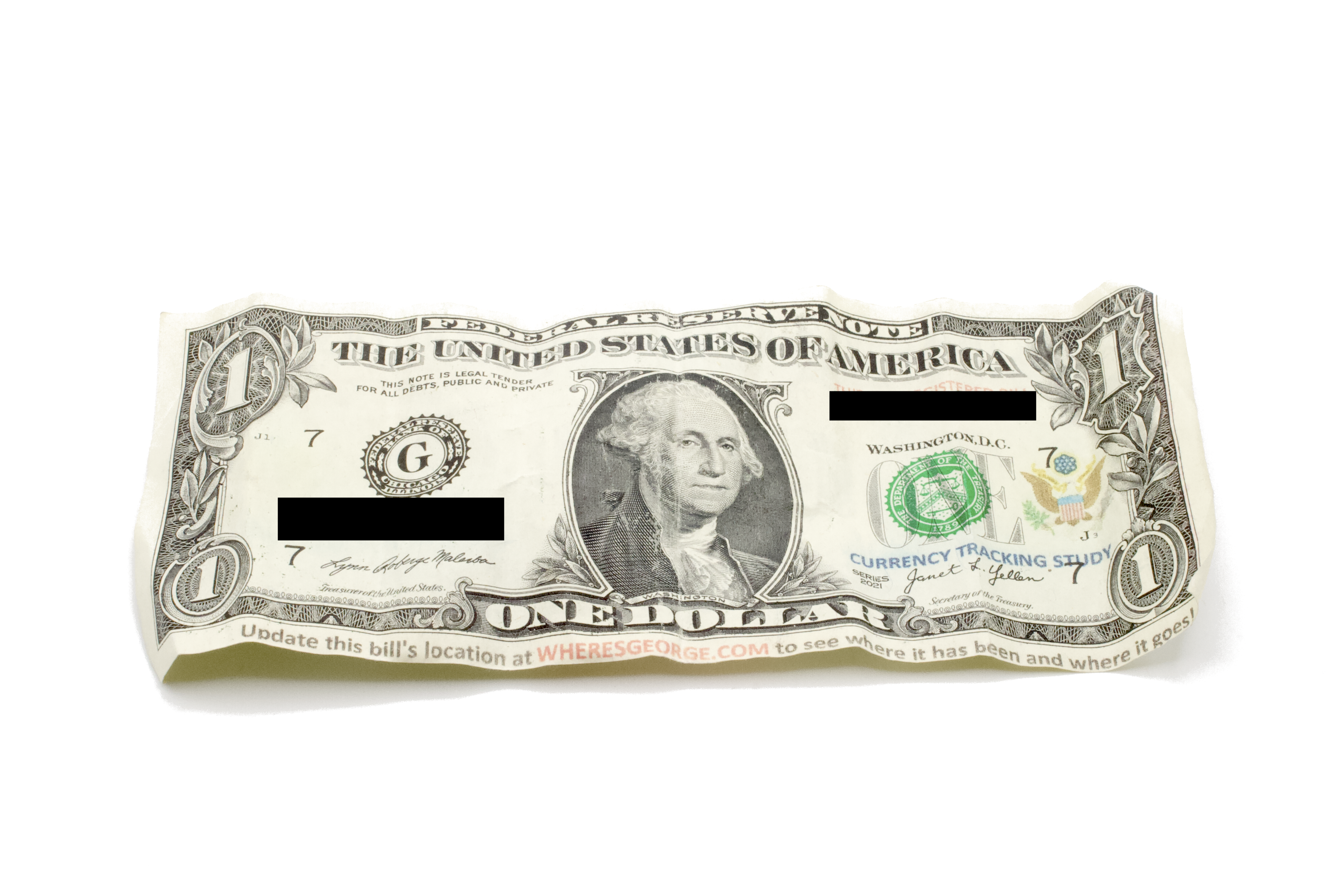
A Series 2021 $1 bill with Where's George? stamps

== Hits ==
A "hit" occurs when a registered bill is re-entered into the database after its initial entry. Where's George? does not have specific goals other than tracking currency movements, but many users like to collect interesting patterns of hits, called "bingos". One of the most commonly sought after bingos involves getting at least one hit in all 50 states (called "50 State Bingo"). Another common bingo, called "FRB Bingo", occurs when a user gets hits on bills from all 12 Federal Reserve Banks.

Most bills do not receive any responses, or hits, but many bills receive two or more hits. As of November 2020, the site recorded about 5,000 entries for found bills daily. The approximate hit rate is around 11.4%. Double- and triple-hitters are common, and bills with 4 or 5 hits are not unheard of. Almost daily, a bill receives its 6th hit. As of June 2026, the site record is held by a $1 bill with 17 entries.

To increase the chance of having a bill reported, users (called "Georgers") may write or stamp text on the bills encouraging bill finders to visit www.wheresgeorge.com and track the bill's travels. Bills that are entered into the database, but not marked, are known as "naturals", "stealths", or "ghosts". If a bill entry violates the established rules of "natural circulation" (e.g. a user has found the same bill twice, a user directly traded a bill with another person who is also a user of the site, a user has had more than 20 bills wind up with another user, etc.), the hit is allowed, but it is marked as an "alternate entry". If a user claims a "wild" (A bill found in circulation that has been marked or stamped with wheresgeorge.com as having already been entered on the site.), they are the submitters' "child".

== Controversy ==
The site does not encourage the defacement of US currency. In October 1999, when interviewed for The New York Times, Eskin commented on why the Secret Service has not bothered the webmaster over possible defacement of US currency: "They've got better things to do. They want to catch counterfeiters counterfeiting billions of dollars."

In April 2000, the site was investigated by the United States Secret Service, which informed Eskin that the selling of "Where's George?" rubber stamps on the web site is considered "advertising" on United States currency, which is illegal under 18 U.S.C. § 475. The site's administrators immediately ceased selling the rubber stamps; no further action against the site was taken. At least one spokesperson for the US Secret Service has pointed out in print that marking US bills, even if not defacement, can still be illegal if it falls under "advertisement". However, a Secret Service spokesman in Seattle, Washington, told The Seattle Times in 2004: "Quite frankly, we wouldn't spend too much looking into this."

== Where's George? and geocaching ==
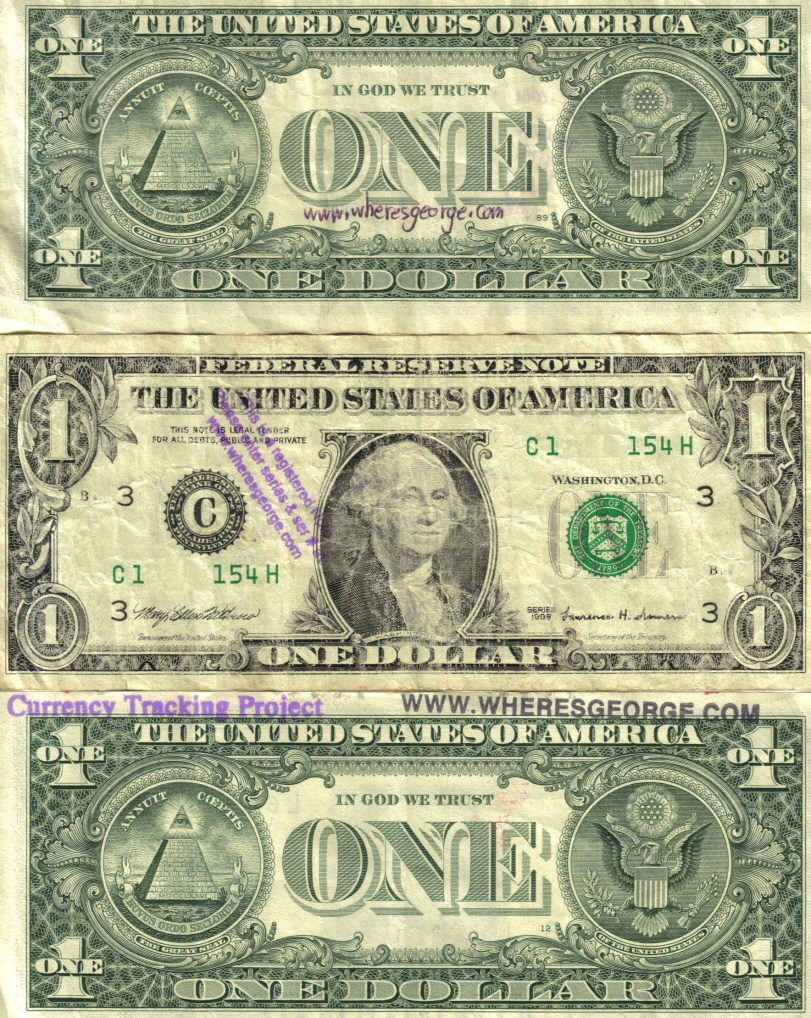
Examples of marked bills, with one bearing the site's address in handwriting, and the others marked by rubber stamping. The serial number for the central bill has been redacted out, which is commonly done to prevent people from entering the bill into the system without physically possessing it.

The Where's George? site says it "prohibits trading or exchanging bills with friends, family or anyone known to the bill distributor for the purpose of re-entry". This rule is to encourage natural circulation of the currency, and to prevent multiple fake hits from happening on any bill. As a result, all bill entry notes containing the word "geocache" or "cache" are tagged as a geocache bill. The site has also dropped a separate listing of "Top 10 Geocache bills" and is cautioning that, if geocache sites are used too often, "all Geocache bills will be removed from this site".

== George Score ==
The "George Score" is a method of rating users based on how many bills they have entered, and by how many total hits they have had. The formula is as follows:

$100\times\left[\sqrt{\ln({\rm bills\ entered})}+\ln({\rm hits}+1)\right]\times[1-({\rm days\ of\ inactivity}/100)]$

This logarithmic formula means the more bills a user enters and the more hits the user receives, the less the user's score increases for each entered bill or new hit. Thus, a user's score does not increase as quickly when the user has entered many bills. User ranking can decrease based on inactivity (failure to refresh the "Your Bills" report). Wattsburg Gary, the user with the most bills entered (over 2 million entries per the Wheresgeorge database) has an official George Score of over 1,700 when refreshed, and often holds the #1 rank. While bulk entry is allowed, the site prohibits marking bills and depositing them into financial institutions.

== Community ==
Where's George? includes a community of users who interact via forums. The forums divide into several categories, from regional to new-member-help threads. Some members of the site participate in "gatherings", held in cities around the United States. Several gatherings have become annual events, varying in scope and size.

The 2006 documentary by Brian Galbreath, WheresGeorge.com, gives insight into the hobby, hobbyists, and their gatherings. The twenty-seven minute movie features interviews with site creator Hank Eskin, "Georgers" at a St. Louis, Missouri gathering, and narrated information and statistics about the site and culture. The film aired on PBS member stations WTTW Chicago and WSIU-TV Carbondale, IL.

== Use in research ==
Although Where's George? does not officially recognize the bills that travel the farthest or fastest, some have approached it as a semi-serious way to track patterns in the flow of American currency.

Money flow displayed through Where's George was used in a 2006 research paper published by theoretical physicist Dirk Brockmann and his coworkers. The paper described statistical laws of human travel in the United States, and developed a mathematical model of the spread of infectious disease resulting from such travel. The article was published in the January 26, 2006, issue of the journal Nature. Researchers found that 57% of the nearly half a million dollar bills studied traveled between 30 and 500 miles (48 and 805 km) over approximately nine months in the United States. A short clip of a Brockmann's presentation on the subject from the IdeaFestival has been posted on YouTube. In 2009 "Where's George?" data have been used to attempt to predict the rapidity and pattern of projected spread of the 2009 swine flu pandemic.

== See also ==
- BookCrossing – service to track used book circulation
- Currency bill tracking
- EuroBillTracker - tracks Euro notes
- The Money Tracker – the site's Australian counterpart
- Overprint - printed text layer on currency, stamps
- Stamp Stampede U.S. currency-stamping campaign to get big money out of politics
- Twenty Bucks – 1993 film about the fictional travels of a $20 bill
- Where's Willy? – the site's Canadian counterpart
