= Helmbrechts =

- Town
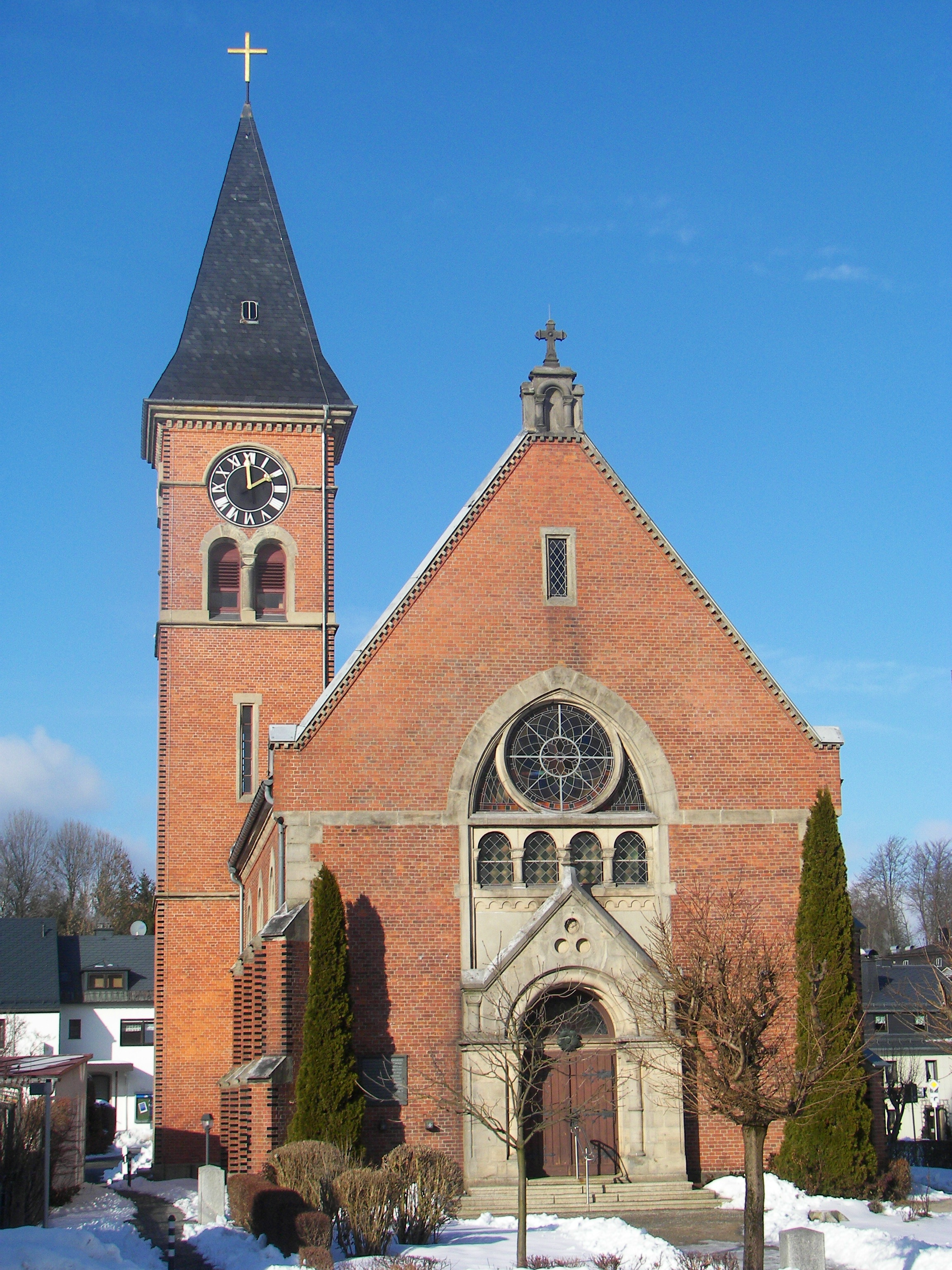
- Martin Luther Church

- Coat of arms

- Location of Helmbrechts within Hof district
- Interactive map of Helmbrechts
- Location within Germany Location within Bavaria
- Coordinates: 50°13′N 11°41′E
- Country: Germany
- State: Bavaria
- Admin. region: Oberfranken
- District: Hof

Government
  - Mayor (2020–26): Stefan Pöhlmann (SPD)

Area
  - Total: 58.72 km^{2} (22.67 sq mi)
- Elevation: 616 m (2,021 ft)

Population (2025-12-31)
  - Total: 8,033
  - Density: 136.8/km^{2} (354.3/sq mi)
- Time zone: UTC+01:00 (CET)
  - Summer (DST): UTC+02:00 (CEST)
- Postal codes: 95233
- Dialling codes: 09252
- Vehicle registration: HO
- Website: www.stadt-helmbrechts.de

Helmbrechts (German pronunciation: [ˈhɛlmbʁɛçts]) is a town in the district of Hof, in Bavaria, Germany. It is situated on the southern edge of the Franconian Forest, 20 km southwest of Hof.

== History ==
The first documented mention of Helmbrechts dates back to 1232. Township was granted to Helmbrechts by Count Friedrich V. of Nürnberg in the year 1422. Helmbrechts has been in Bavarian rule since 1810, and eventually became part of the German Empire in 1871, and then the German republic after World War I. During World War II, Helmbrechts was the location of the Helmbrechts concentration camp, a women's subcamp of the Flossenbürg concentration camp, which was founded near Helmbrechts in the summer of 1944. Over 1,200 women, mostly from German-occupied Poland, Soviet Union, Czechoslovakia and Hungary, were imprisoned in the subcamp and used as forced labour. Dozens of prisoners died, including some being beaten to death or hanged after escape attempts. Around 200 women died in a death march, when the Germans evacuated the subcamp in April 1945. Following World War II, the town formed part of West Germany until 1990.

== Geography ==
=== The city districts ===
With the local government reorganization in 1972, the following villages were merged to Helmbrechts' district:

- Absang
- Almbranz
- Altsuttenbach
- Bärenbrunn
- Baiergrün
- Bischofsmühle
- Buckenreuth
- Bühl
- Burkersreuth
- Dreschersreuth
- Edlendorf
- Einzigenhöfen
- Enchenreuth
- Geigersmühle
- Gösmes
- Günthersdorf
- Hampelhof
- Helmbrechts
- Hohberg
- Hopfenmühle
- Jägersruh
- Kleinschwarzenbach
- Kollerhammer
- Kriegsreuth
- Lehsten
- Oberbrumberg
- Oberweißenbach
- Ochsenbrunn
- Ort
- Ottengrün
- Ottengrüner Einzel
- Rappetenreuth
- Rauhenberg
- Schlegelmühle
- Stechera
- Suttenbach
- Taubaldsmühle
- Unterbrumberg
- Unterweißenbach
- Wüstenselbitz
- Zimmermühle

=== Weavers‘ cottage ===
Kleinschwarzenbach is a small village in Helmbrechts with a long tradition of weaving. One of the weavers‘ cottages from pre-industrial times can be visited.

=== Upper Franconian Textile museum, Helmbrechts ===
The Textilmuseum Helmbrechts has examples of the local weaving and dyeing industry. Included is a very long woven scarf which claims to be the longest in the world, visitors are invited to extend. It also hosts a café and an arts and performance venue.
