= Dausset =

Dausset may refer to:

== People with the surname ==
- Jean Dausset (1916-2009), French immunologist.
- Louis Dausset (1866-1940), French politician

== Other ==
- Fondation Jean Dausset-CEPH, research centre based in Paris, France.
