= Christophe Salomon =

French physicist

- Born: 23 November 1953 (age 72)
- Citizenship: French
- Education: École Centrale Paris; University of Paris XIII (PhD)
- Known for: Atomic fountain clocks ACES/PHARAO space clock Bloch oscillations of cold atoms BEC-BCS crossover Equation of state of ultracold Fermi gases
- Awards: Balzan Prize (2025); Member of the French Academy of Sciences (2017); Gay-Lussac Humboldt Prize (2011); Grand Prix Louis D., Institut de France (2012); Fellow of the American Physical Society (2014)
- Scientific career
- Fields: Quantum optics Cold atoms Atomic clocks Ultracold quantum gases
- Workplaces: Kastler-Brossel Laboratory, ENS; CNRS
- Thesis: Ramsey fringes and high-resolution spectroscopy in the infrared (1984)
- Doctoral advisor: Christian Bordé

Christophe Salomon (born 23 November 1953) is a French physicist specializing in quantum optics, cold atoms, atomic clocks, and ultracold quantum gases. He is an emeritus research director at the CNRS, based at the Kastler-Brossel Laboratory of the École normale supérieure (ENS). A pioneer in the use of laser-cooled atoms for precision measurements and many-body physics, Salomon developed the first cesium atomic fountain clock and has served since 1997 as principal investigator of the European ACES/PHARAO space clock mission, which was launched to the International Space Station in April 2025.

== Education and early career ==
From 1973 to 1976, Salomon studied at the École centrale des arts et manufactures in Paris. He entered the Laboratoire de Physique des Lasers at the University of Paris-Nord in 1978 and defended his troisième cycle thesis in 1979 on high-resolution saturation spectroscopy with waveguide CO_{2} lasers. He joined the CNRS in 1980 as a research fellow at the same laboratory and completed his doctoral thesis in 1984 on Ramsey fringes and high-resolution laser spectroscopy in the infrared.

In 1985, Salomon undertook a postdoctoral fellowship at JILA, University of Colorado, working with John L. Hall (recipient of the 2005 Nobel Prize in Physics) on ultra-stable lasers and laser cooling of atoms.

== Career at the École normale supérieure ==
In 1986, Salomon joined the first research group in France on cold atoms, created by Claude Cohen-Tannoudji (1997 Nobel Prize in Physics) and Alain Aspect at the École normale supérieure. He became a CNRS research fellow at the Kastler-Brossel Laboratory, where he would spend the remainder of his career. In 1990, he was promoted to second-class research director. In 2000, he became first-class research director and co-headed the "Cold Atoms" group with Jean Dalibard. In 2008, he became head of the "Ultra-Cold Fermi Gas" group at the Kastler Brossel laboratory. He became an emeritus research director at the CNRS in February 2021.

From 2017 to 2020, Salomon served as director of the Les Houches Physics School. He also served as delegate of the Physics section of the French Academy of Sciences from 2021 to 2024.

== Research ==
=== Atomic fountain clocks ===
In collaboration with André Clairon at the Paris Observatory, Salomon developed the first cesium clock operating as an atomic fountain. These ultra-precise clocks are now the foundation of International Atomic Time and advanced technologies such as the GPS.

=== ACES/PHARAO space clock mission ===
Since 1992, Salomon has been principal investigator for the PHARAO cold atom space clock, developed by CNES (the French space agency). Since 1997, he has served as principal investigator for the Atomic Clock Ensemble in Space (ACES), a European Space Agency mission that places ultra-stable atomic clocks on the International Space Station (ISS) to test Einstein's general relativity and perform high-precision frequency comparisons of distant clocks. The PHARAO clock design originated from pioneering work carried out at the Kastler Brossel laboratory in the 1990s in Cohen-Tannoudji's group. ACES was launched to the ISS on 21 April 2025 aboard a SpaceX Falcon 9 rocket and installed on the Columbus module on 25 April 2025.

=== Ultracold quantum gases ===
At temperatures below the microkelvin, atoms exhibit spectacular quantum behaviours. Salomon and his group were the first to observe Bloch oscillations of ultracold atoms in an optical potential and solitons of matter waves. His group played a decisive role in understanding the crossover between the BCS superfluidity of Cooper pairs for attractive interacting fermions and the Bose–Einstein condensation of tightly bound pairs (the BEC-BCS crossover). Working with Frédéric Chevy, Sylvain Nascimbène, and Nir Navon, Salomon's group developed a general method to probe the thermodynamics of homogeneous quantum systems using trapped atomic gases, measuring the equation of state of both Bose and Fermi gases with tunable interactions. This work helped pave the way for quantitative N-body physics in the regime of strong correlations.

== Selected publications ==
- Maxime Ben Dahan; Ekkehard Peik; Jakob Reichel; Yvan Castin; Christophe Salomon (10 June 1996). "Bloch Oscillations of Atoms in an Optical Potential". Physical Review Letters. 76 (24): 4508–4511. doi:10.1103/physrevlett.76.4508. ISSN 0031-9007. PMID 10061309. Wikidata Q27335380.
- F. Schreck; L. Khaykovich; K. L. Corwin; G. Ferrari; T. Bourdel; J. Cubizolles; C. Salomon (7 August 2001). "Quasipure Bose-Einstein condensate immersed in a Fermi sea". Physical Review Letters. 87 (8) 080403. arXiv:cond-mat/0107442. Bibcode:2001PhRvL..87h0403S. doi:10.1103/physrevlett.87.080403. ISSN 0031-9007. PMID 11497930. S2CID 6532321. Wikidata Q74347030.
- Christian G Parthey; Arthur Matveev; Janis Alnis; et al. (11 November 2011). "Improved measurement of the hydrogen 1S-2S transition frequency". Physical Review Letters. 107 (20) 203001. arXiv:1107.3101. doi:10.1103/physrevlett.107.203001. ISSN 0031-9007. PMID 22181729. Wikidata Q64992680.

== Honours and awards ==
- 1988: Science and Defence Young Researcher Award
- 1993: European Time-Frequency Prize
- 1993: Philip Morris Prize (Cold Atom Clocks)
- 2000: Mergier-Bourdeix Prize, French Academy of Sciences
- 2005: Three Physicists Prize (ENS)
- 2009: Advanced Grant, European Research Council
- 2011: Gay-Lussac Humboldt Prize
- 2011: Jules Haag Medal, French Society of Microtechnology and Chronometry
- 2012: Grand Prix Louis D., Institut de France
- 2014: Fellow of the American Physical Society
- 2014: Galileo Ferraris Memorial Lecture Award, INRIM
- 2017: Elected member of the French Academy of Sciences
- 2017: Senior Fellowship, European Research Council (2017–2022)
- 2025: Balzan Prize (Ultra-Cold Atoms for the Measurement of Time)
