= Ceph =

Ceph or CEPH may refer to:

== Science and technology ==
- Ceph (software), a distributed data storage platform
- Cephalopod, any member of the molluscan class Cephalopoda
- Cephalanthera, a genus of orchids

== Organizations ==
- Council on Education for Public Health, a US agency
- Fondation Jean Dausset-CEPH, a genetic research center, formerly the Centre d'Etude du Polymorphisme Humain
- Cephalon (NASDAQ: CEPH), a former American biopharmaceutical company

== Other uses ==
- Ceph, the enemy alien race in the Crysis video games

== See also ==
- Cephalonia, a Greek island
