= Prix de l'État =

The Prix de l'État (English: National Prize) of the French Academy of Sciences is a science award founded by the French National Convention in 1795 and financed by state funds. It is awarded in the fields of mathematics, physics, mechanics, computer science, earth sciences, biology and chemistry and is endowed with 7600 euros. It is awarded annually, with the exception of physics, which is awarded every four years.

== Laureates since 1960 ==
- 1960: Szolem Mandelbrojt
- 1961: Albert Policard
- 1962: Jacques Dixmier
- 1963: Pierre Nicolle
- 1964: Laurent Schwartz
- 1965: René Wurmser
- 1966: André Guinier
- 1967: Jean Dausset
- 1968: Gustave Choquet
- 1969: Xavier Duval
- 1970: René Thom
- 1971: Pierre Chatelain
- 1972: Pierre Lelong
- 1973: Pierre Douzou
- 1974: André Martin
- 1975: Marcel Bessis
- 1976: Jacques Tits
- 1977: Hélène Charniaux-Cotton
- 1978: Noël Felici
- 1979: Marc Fellous
- 1980: Jean-Pierre Kahane
- 1981: Lionel Salem
- 1982: Evry Schatzman
- 1983: Jean-Charles Schwartz
- 1984: Yves Meyer
- 1985: Stratis Avrameas
- 1986: Claude Lorius
- 1987: Jean Normant
- 1988: Franck Laloë
- 1989: Francis Durst
- 1990: Jean-Pierre Hansen
- 1991: Maurice Israël
- 1992: Gilles Pisier
- 1993: Jacques Taxi
- 1994: Roger Cayrel
- 1995: Jean Talairach
- 1996: Jean-Michel Bony
- 1997: Jean-Loup Gervais
- 1998: Pierre Gadal
- 1999: Bernard Maurey
- 2000: Jean-Paul Behr
- 2001: Camille Cohen
- 2002: Émile Miginiac
- 2003: Louis Boutet de Monvel
- 2004: Joël Moreau
- 2005: Jean-Michel Gérard
- 2006: Hervé Sentenac
- 2007: Nicolas Burq
- 2008: Anny Jutand
- 2009: François Amiranoff, Victor Malka, Patrick Mora
- 2010: Richard Miles
- 2011: Bernard Helffer
- 2012: Michel Ephritikhine
- 2013: Andreas Hoecker
- 2015: Yves Guivarc'h
- 2016: Christian Serre
- 2017: Pierre Le Doussal
- 2018: Christian Giaume, François Michel
- 2019: Michela Varagnolo, Éric Vasserot
- 2020: Anna Proust
- 2021: Marie-Hélène Schune
- 2022: Christophe Plomion
- 2023: Nicolas Bergeron
