= Claude Fabre =

French physicist (born 1951)

- Born: April 23, 1951 (age 75); Paris, France
- Education: École Normale Supérieure, Paris
- Scientific career
- Fields: Physics; Quantum optics
- Workplaces: Sorbonne University; Kastler-Brossel Laboratory; École normale supérieure; Collège de France
- Doctoral advisor: Claude Cohen-Tannoudji

Claude Fabre (born April 23, 1951) is a French physicist, professor emeritus at the Sorbonne University and member of the Kastler-Brossel Laboratory of Sorbonne University, École normale supérieure and Collège de France.

== Career ==
From 1970 to 1974 Claude Fabre studied at the École Normale Supérieure (Paris) and University Paris 6. In 1974, he obtained the agrégation in physics and completed his MSc studies with Claude Cohen-Tannoudji as supervisor. In that same year, he obtained a position at the French National Center for Scientific Research (CNRS), working under the supervision of Serge Haroche at the "Laboratoire de spectroscopie hertzienne de l'ENS", later renamed as Kastler-Brossel Laboratory. He earned his Ph.D. in 1980.

In 1984–1985, he was a visiting scientist at the IBM Laboratory, San Jose California. He became CNRS Director of Research from 1986 to 1998, and part time associate professor at the École polytechnique. In 1998, he left CNRS to become Professor at the Université Pierre-et-Marie-Curie, now integrated in Sorbonne University.

Fabre was director of the Doctoral School of Physics in Paris area from 2001 to 2007, and editor in chief of the European Physical Journal D from 2008 to 2012. In 2009, he was a visiting researcher at the National Institute of Standards and Technology, Gaithersburg, then invited professor at the East China Normal University, Shanghai. He was president of the French Optical Society from 2009 to 2011, and senior member of the Institut universitaire de France from 2007 to 2017.

In addition to his activities as researcher and educator, Fabre is active in reinforcing links between the university and High School teaching. From 2007 to 2010 he was chair of jury of "agrégation de physique", recruiting high level physics teachers, then in 2010-2012 member of the committee of reform of physics curricula in high schools, and from 2013 to 2015, commissioned by the minister of education to coordinate the steering committee in charge of the reform of teachers training (École supérieure du professorat et de l'éducation).

Fabre has also been active in scientific outreach, in particular during the World Year of Physics (2005), the 50th anniversary of laser (2005) and the World Year of Light (2015).

== Research areas ==
- His earlier research work concerned the interaction between microwaves and highly excited atoms (Rydberg states), both from the theoretical and experimental sides.
- Since 1987, his main research subject has been the study of the non-classical properties of light, in particular the study of the quantum fluctuations of light field and of the strong quantum correlations existing between entangled light beams.
  - Fabre is particularly interested in the quantum aspects of complex or multimodal optical systems with many quantum degrees of freedom, like optical images and light pulses of arbitrary shapes.
  - He has used these correlations and tailored quantum fluctuations to further the quantum limits of high sensitivity measurements: weak absorption, accurate space-time positioning, improvement of optical resolution, and clock synchronization.
  - He is also involved in the application of such "multimode quantum technologies" to quantum information processing.
