= Michela Varagnolo =

Italian-French mathematician

Michela Varagnolo is a mathematician whose research topics have included representation theory, Hecke algebra, Schur–Weyl duality, Yangians, and quantum affine algebras. She earned a doctorate in 1993 at the University of Pisa, under the supervision of Corrado de Concini, and is maître de conférences in the department of mathematics at CY Cergy Paris University, affiliated there with the research laboratory on analysis, geometry, and modeling.

Varagnolo was an invited speaker at the 2014 International Congress of Mathematicians. In 2019, with Éric Vasserot, she won the Prix de l'État of the French Academy of Sciences for their work on the geometric representation theory of Hecke algebras and quantum groups.
