= Kristan Corwin =

American physicist and academic

Kristan Lee Corwin
- Education: University at Buffalo; University of Colorado Boulder; École normale supérieure
- Scientific career
- Workplaces: Kansas State University; National Institute of Standards and Technology
- Thesis: A circularly-polarized optical dipole trap and other developments in laser trapping of atoms (1999)

Kristan Lee Corwin is an American physicist who is a professor and division chief at the National Institute of Standards and Technology. Her research considers nonlinear optics and emerging laser systems.

== Early life and education ==
Corwin grew up in Western New York. She studied physics at the University at Buffalo. She moved to the University of Colorado Boulder for graduate studies, where she worked on laser trapping and molecular cooling with Carl Wieman. She moved to the École Normale Supérieure for a postdoctoral fellowship, where she worked alongside Christophe Salomon on quantum gases. Corwin then returned to the United States, where she worked as a research fellow at the National Institute of Standards and Technology.

== Research and career ==
In 2003, Corwin joined the faculty at the Kansas State University, where she was made Ernest K. and Lillian E. Chapin Professor of Physics and Dean for Research. Her research has considered nonlinear optics and novel laser systems. In 2019, she was made Division Chief at National Institute of Standards and Technology.

== Awards and honors ==
- 2015 Visiting Fellow at JILA
- 2019 American Physical Society Five Sigma Physicist Award
- 2021 Elected Fellow of Optica

== Selected publications ==
- F. Schreck; L. Khaykovich; K. L. Corwin; G. Ferrari; T. Bourdel; J. Cubizolles; C. Salomon (7 August 2001). "Quasipure Bose-Einstein condensate immersed in a Fermi sea". Physical Review Letters. 87 (8) 080403. arXiv:cond-mat/0107442. Bibcode:2001PhRvL..87h0403S. doi:10.1103/physrevlett.87.080403. ISSN 0031-9007. PMID 11497930. S2CID 6532321. Wikidata Q74347030.
- Kristan L. Corwin; Zheng-Tian Lu; Carter F. Hand; Ryan J. Epstein; Wieman CE (1 May 1998). "Frequency-stabilized diode laser with the Zeeman shift in an atomic vapor". Applied Optics. 37 (15): 3295–3298. Bibcode:1998ApOpt..37.3295C. doi:10.1364/ao.37.003295. ISSN 1559-128X. PMID 18273286. S2CID 15786370. Wikidata Q33319756.
- Z. T. Lu; K. L. Corwin; M. J. Renn; M. H. Anderson; E. A. Cornell; C. E. Wieman (1 October 1996). "Low-Velocity Intense Source of Atoms from a Magneto-optical Trap". Physical Review Letters. 77 (16): 3331–3334. Bibcode:1996PhRvL..77.3331L. doi:10.1103/physrevlett.77.3331. ISSN 0031-9007. PMID 10062193. S2CID 45282721. Wikidata Q74571758.
