= Kastler–Brossel Laboratory =

Quantum research laboratory in Paris, France

Coordinates: 48.843°N 2.3467°E

The Kastler–Brossel Laboratory, (formerly the Laboratory of Hertzian Spectroscopy) located in Paris, France, is a research laboratory specializing in fundamental physics of quantum systems. Founded in 1951 by Alfred Kastler and Jean Brossel, it is a joint research unit (French UMR 8552) operated by the French National Centre for Scientific Research (CNRS), the École normale supérieure, the Sorbonne University and the Collège de France.

== Brief history ==
The laboratory was founded in 1951 by Alfred Kastler (Nobel Prize in Physics in 1966) and Jean Brossel on the theme of the interaction between light and matter. The initial name of laboratory was the « Laboratoire de spectroscopie Hertzienne de l'ENS » (Laboratory of Hertzian Spectroscopy). It is located in the Department of Physics of École normale supérieure.

In 1967, a second site opened on the Jussieu campus.

In 1994, the laboratory changed its name to « Laboratoire Kastler Brossel » in honor of its two founders.

Now, the Kastler Brossel Laboratory (LKB) is one of the main actors in the field of fundamental physics of quantum systems.

== Research activity ==
Many new themes have appeared recently in the field of fundamental physics of quantum systems, like quantum entanglement or Bose–Einstein condensation in gases, which leads to a constant renewal of the research carried out in the laboratory. Presently its activity takes several forms: cold atoms (bosonic and fermionics systems), atom lasers, quantum fluids, atoms in solid helium; quantum optics, cavity quantum electrodynamics; quantum information and quantum theory of measurement; quantum chaos; high-precision measurements. These themes lead not only to a better understanding of fundamental phenomena, but also to important applications, like more precise atomic clocks, improvement of detectors based on atomic interferometry or new methods for biomedical imaging.

The laboratory also has an important activity in the field of measurement of fundamental constants and tests of fundamental physical theories (quantum electrodynamics, gravitation, strong interaction). It holds records of precision in the measurement of certain fundamental constants. The LKB is also a leader in the PHARAO/ACES1 mission which will send into space a cold atomic clock of unprecedented accuracy to test Einstein's equations of gravitational frequency shift.

== Director and former directors ==
- Jean Brossel (1951–1984)
- Jacques Dupont-Roc (1984–1994)
- Michèle Leduc (1994–1999)
- Elisabeth Giacobino (1999–2000)
- Franck Laloë (2000–2006)
- Paul Indelicato (2006–2012)
- Antoine Heidmann (2012–2025)
- Nicolas Treps (2025-…)

== People ==
Amongst current and past research staff there are :

- 4 Nobel Prize in Physics : Alfred Kastler (1966), Claude Cohen-Tannoudji (1997), Serge Haroche (2012), Alain Aspect (2022)
- 6 CNRS gold medal : Alfred Kastler (1964), Jean Brossel (1984), Claude Cohen-Tannoudji (1996), Alain Aspect (2005), Serge Haroche (2009), Jean Dalibard (2021)
- 7 Members of French Academy of Sciences : Alfred Kastler, Jean Brossel, Claude Cohen-Tannoudji, Serge Haroche, Marie-Anne Bouchiat, Jean Dalibard, Christophe Salomon
- 3 Professors at Collège de France : Claude Cohen-Tannoudji (1973), Serge Haroche (2001), Jean Dalibard (2013)
- 3 Silver medals of CNRS: Jean-Claude Lehmann (1978), Astrid Lambrecht (2013), Julien Laurat (2026)
- 1 Bronze medal of CNRS: Valentina Parigi (2020)
- 1 Medal of scientific mediation of CNRS: Jean-Michel Courty (2021)
- 8 Members of Institut Universitaire de France (IUF): Julien Laurat (2011 et 2022), Alberto Bramati (2018 et 2023), Sylvain Gigan (2015 et 2023), Quentin Glorieux (2018 et 2023), Sylvain Nascimbène (2022), Clément Sayrin (2023), Jérôme Beugnon (2025), and Thibaut Jacqmin (2025)
