= Claude Cohen-Tannoudji =

French physicist (1933–2026)

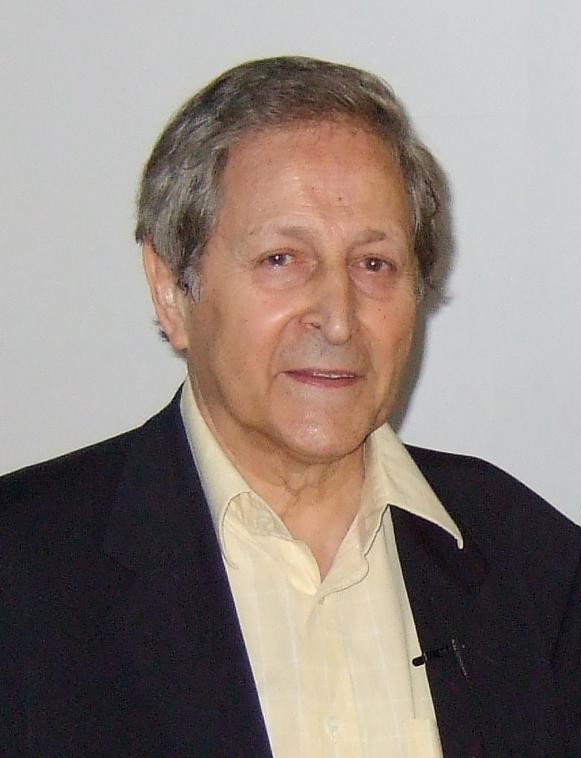
- Cohen-Tannoudji in 2007
- Born: 1 April 1933; Constantine, French Algeria
- Died: 22 October 2026 (aged 93); Paris, France
- Education: École normale supérieure University of Paris
- Known for: Laser cooling Sisyphus cooling Sub-Doppler cooling
- Notable work: Quantum Mechanics
- Spouse: Jacqueline Veyrat (m. 1958)
- Children: 3
- Awards: Prix Paul Langevin (1963); Prix Jean Ricard (1971); Young Medal and Prize (1979); Ampère Prize (1979); Lilienfeld Prize (1992); Matteucci Medal (1994); Harvey Prize (1996); Nobel Prize in Physics (1997)
- Scientific career
- Fields: Physics
- Workplaces: College de France; University of Paris; École normale supérieure (Paris)
- Doctoral advisor: Alfred Kastler
- Doctoral students: Serge Haroche; Jean Dalibard; Claude Fabre

Claude Cohen-Tannoudji (French pronunciation: [klod kɔɛn tanudʒi]; 1 April 1933 – 22 October 2026) was a French physicist at the École normale supérieure in Paris. He was known for his experiments in laser cooling. He first proposed Sisyphus cooling and was the first to show that it is possible to cool far beyond the limit expected by sub-Doppler cooling, below the recoil temperature.

Cohen-Tannoudji shared the 1997 Nobel Prize in Physics with Steven Chu and William Daniel Phillips for research in methods of laser cooling and trapping atoms.

== Early life ==
Claude Cohen-Tannoudji was born in Constantine, French Algeria, on 1 April 1933, to Algerian Sephardic Jewish parents Abraham Cohen-Tannoudji and Sarah Sebbah. When describing his origins Cohen-Tannoudji said: "My family, originally from Tangier, settled in Tunisia and then in Algeria in the 16th century after having fled Spain during the Inquisition. In fact, our name, Cohen-Tannoudji, means simply the Cohen family from Tangiers. The Algerian Jews obtained the French citizenship in 1870 after Algeria became a French colony in 1830."

After finishing secondary school in Algiers in 1953, Cohen-Tannoudji left for Paris to attend the École Normale Supérieure. His professors included Henri Cartan, Laurent Schwartz, and Alfred Kastler. Gilles Cohen-Tannoudji, Claude's brother, also became a physicist.

In 1958 Cohen-Tannoudji married Jacqueline Veyrat, a high school teacher, with whom he has three children. His studies were interrupted when he was conscripted into the army, in which he served for 28 months (longer than usual because of the Algerian War). During this time he is hired by Jacques Blamont to work on the Véronique rocket in the Algerian station in Béchar.

In 1960 he resumed working toward his doctorate, which he obtained from the École Normale Supérieure under the supervision of Alfred Kastler and Jean Brossel at the end of 1962. Cohen-Tannoudji was also one of the earliest students of the summer programs of Les Houches School of Physics.

== Career ==
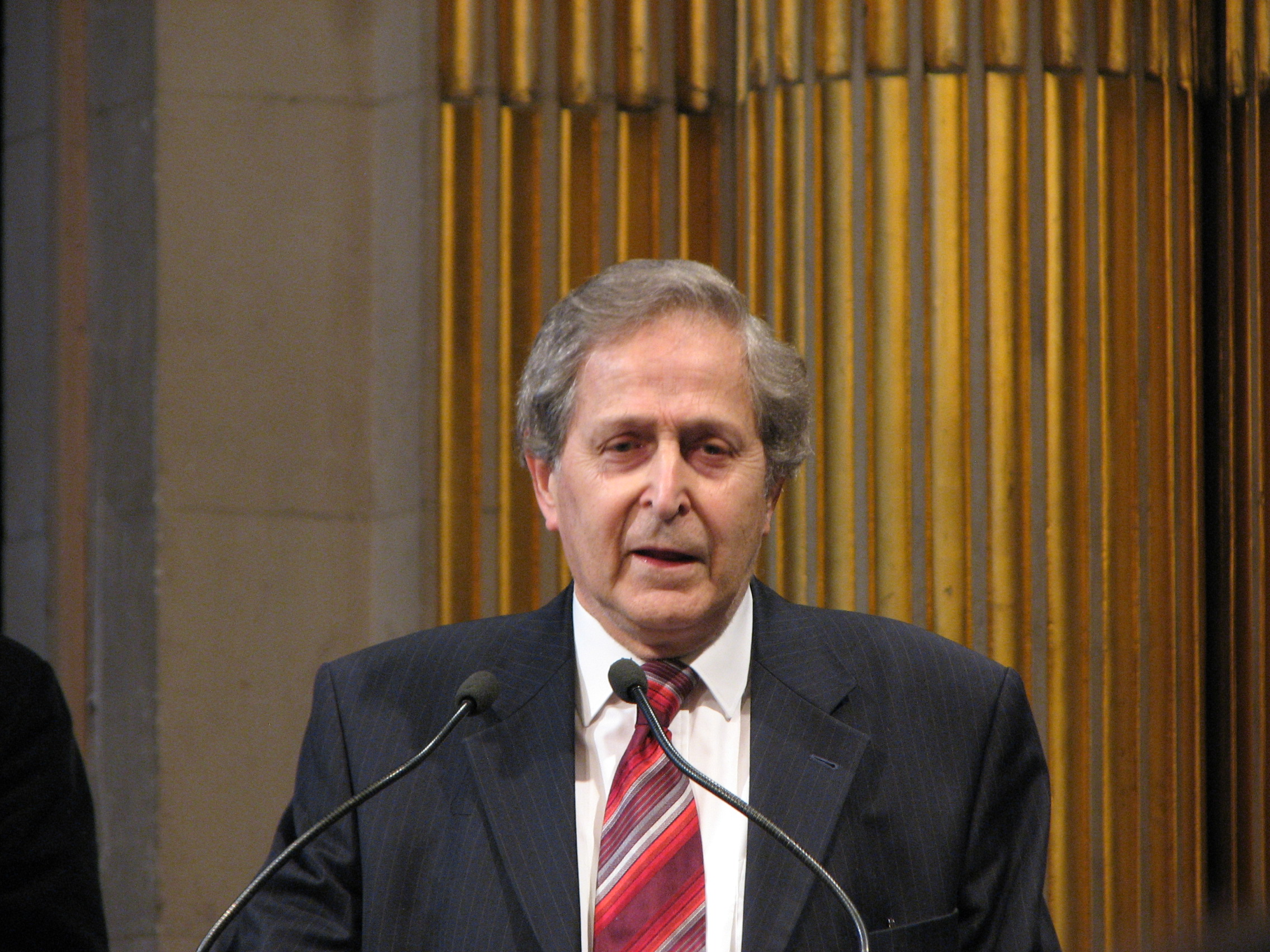
Claude Cohen-Tannoudji in 2010

After his dissertation, he started teaching quantum mechanics at the University of Paris. From 1964-67, he was an associate professor at the university and from 1967-1973 he was a full professor. His lecture notes were the basis of the popular textbook, Quantum Mechanics (French: Mécanique quantique), which he wrote with his colleagues Bernard Diu and Franck Laloë in 1973. He also continued his research work on atom-photon interactions, and his research team developed the model of the dressed atom.

In 1973, he became a professor at the Collège de France. In the early 1980s, he started to lecture on radiative forces on atoms in laser light fields. He also formed a laboratory there with Alain Aspect, Christophe Salomon, and Jean Dalibard to study laser cooling and trapping. He took a statistical approach to laser cooling with the use of stable distributions.

In 1976, he took sabbatical leave from the Collège de France, and lectured at Harvard University and MIT. At Harvard, he was a Loeb Lecturer for two weeks, and at MIT, he was a visiting professor.

In 1995, working with Aspect and others, he managed to cool helium down to180 nK in 1995.

Steven Chu and William Daniel Phillips pioneered laser cooling experiments in the 1980s, demonstrating that photon collisions could cool atomic gases below 1 mK through Doppler cooling. Subsequent observations revealed cooling beyond the Doppler limit, which Cohen-Tannoudji explained theoretically and used to develop more effective cooling methods. In 1995, his team cooled helium gas to even lower temperatures, reaching 180 nK. His work eventually led to the Nobel Prize in physics in 1997 "for the development of methods to cool and trap atoms with laser light", shared with Chu and Phillips. Cohen-Tannoudji was the first physics Nobel prize winner born in an Arab country.

Serge Haroche, 2012 Nobel Prize laureate in Physics, was a doctoral student of Cohen-Tannoudji.

In 2015, Cohen-Tannoudji signed the Mainau Declaration 2015 on Climate Change on the final day of the 65th Lindau Nobel Laureate Meeting. The declaration was signed by a total of 76 Nobel Laureates and handed to then-French President François Hollande, as part of the COP21 climate summit in Paris.

== Death ==
Cohen-Tannoudji died in Paris on 22 October 2026, at the age of 93.

== Awards ==
Claude Cohen-Tannoudji, UNESCO, 2011

- 1969 – CNRS Silver Medal
- 1979 – Young Medal and Prize, for distinguished research in the field of optics.
- 1991 – Research Award of Alexander von Humboldt Foundation
- 1993 – Charles Hard Townes Award
- 1994 – honorary doctorate from the Faculty of Science and Technology at Uppsala University, Sweden
- 1996 – Quantum Electronics Prize of the European Physical Society
- 1996 – CNRS Gold medal
- 1997 – Nobel Prize, "for the development of methods to cool and trap atoms with laser light"
- 2002 – Honorary Member of the Optical Society
- 2010 – Legion of Honour

== Selected works ==
The main works of Cohen-Tannoudji are given in his homepage.

- Claude Cohen-Tannoudji, Bernard Diu, and Frank Laloë. 1973. Mécanique quantique. 2 vols. Collection Enseignement des Sciences. Paris. ISBN 2-7056-5733-9 (Quantum Mechanics. Vol. I & II, 1991. Wiley, New-York, ISBN 0-471-16433-X & ISBN 0-471-16435-6).
- Claude Cohen-Tannoudji, Gilbert Grynberg and Jacques Dupont-Roc. Introduction à l'électrodynamique quantique. (Photons and Atoms: Introduction to Quantum Electrodynamics. 1997. Wiley. ISBN 0-471-18433-0)
- Claude Cohen-Tannoudji, Gilbert Grynberg and Jacques Dupont-Roc, Processus d'interaction photons-atomes. (Atoms-Photon Interactions: Basic Processes and Applications. 1992. Wiley, New-York. ISBN 0-471-62556-6)
- Claude Cohen-Tannoudji. 2004. Atoms in Electromagnetic fields. 2nd Edition. World Scientific. Collection of his most important papers.
- Cohen-Tannoudji, Claude (1962). Théorie quantitative du cycle de pompage optique, Vérification expérimentale des nouveaux effets prévus (Doctoral thesis).

== See also ==
- List of Jewish Nobel laureates
