= Nuclear acoustic resonance =

Nuclear acoustic resonance is a phenomenon closely related to nuclear magnetic resonance. It involves utilizing ultrasound and ultrasonic acoustic waves of frequencies between 1 MHz and 100 MHz to determine the acoustic radiation resulted from interactions of particles that experience nuclear spins as a result of magnetic and/or electric fields. The principles of nuclear acoustic resonance are often compared with nuclear magnetic resonance, specifically its usage in conjunction with nuclear magnetic resonance systems for spectroscopy and related imaging methods. Due to this, it is denoted that nuclear acoustic resonance can be used for the imaging of objects as well. However, for most cases, nuclear acoustic resonance requires the presence of nuclear magnetic resonance to induce electron spins within specimens in order for the absorption of acoustic waves to occur. Research conducted through experimental and theoretical investigations relative to the absorption of acoustic radiation of different materials, ranging from metals to subatomic particles, have deducted that nuclear acoustic resonance has its specific usages in other fields other than imaging. Experimental observations of nuclear acoustic resonance was first obtained in 1963 by Alers and Fleury in solid aluminum.

== History ==
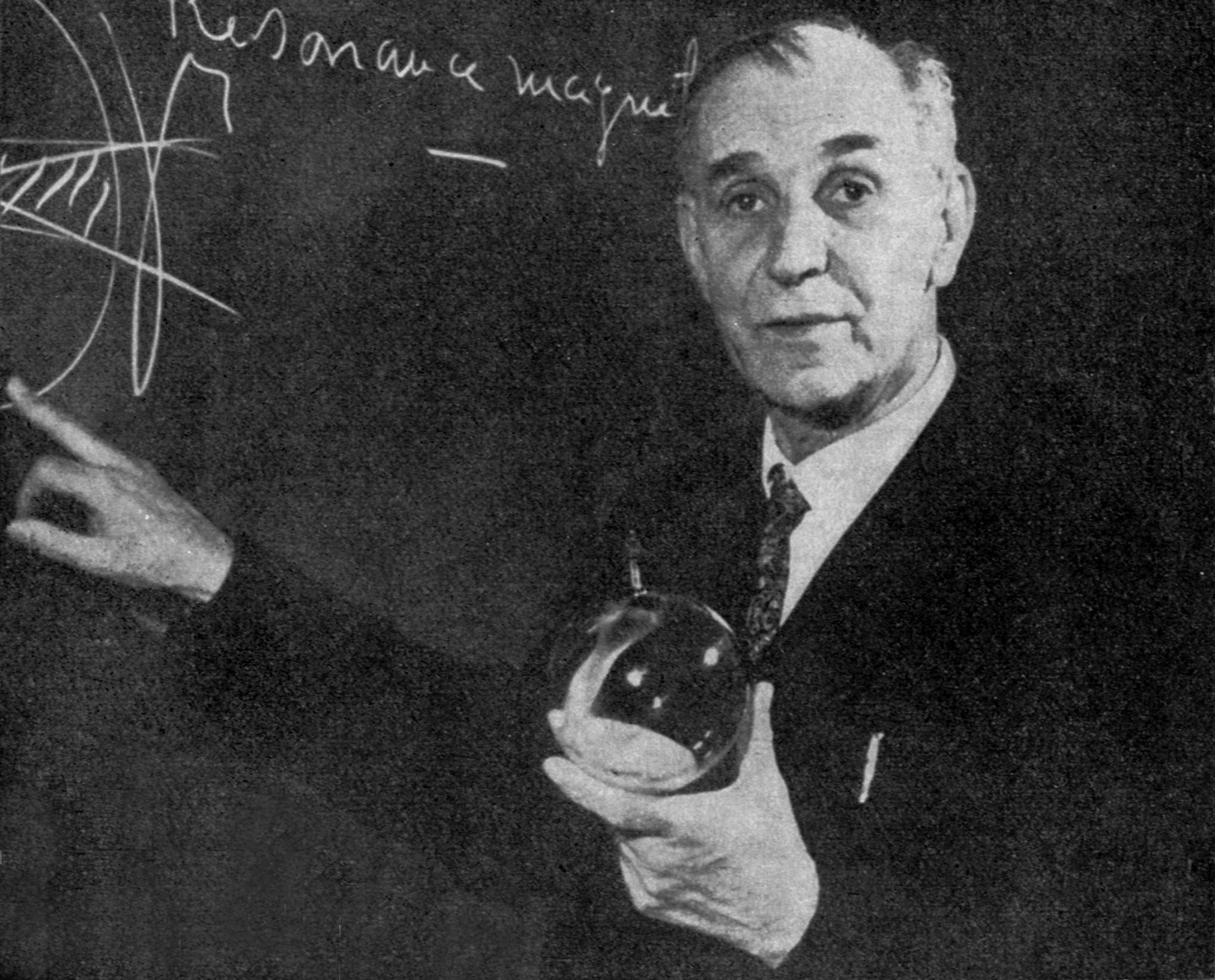
French Physicist Alfred Kastler

Nuclear acoustic resonance was first discussed in 1952 when Semen Altshuler proposed that the acoustic coupling to nuclear spins should be visible. This was also proposed by Alfred Kastler around the same time. From his specialization in the field, Altshuler theorized the nuclear spin-acoustic phonon interactions which resulted with experimentation in 1955. The experiments led physicists to suggest that nuclear acoustic resonance coupling in metals could be formulated and observed, with modern physicists discussing the many properties of nuclear acoustic resonance, although it is not a widely known concept. Concepts of nuclear acoustic resonance in objects have been theorized and predicted by many physicists, but it was not until in 1963 when the first observation of the phenomenon occurred in solid aluminum along with observation of its dispersion in 1973, and subsequently, the first experimental nuclear acoustic resonance in liquid gallium in 1975. However, the aspect of acoustic spin resonance has been observed by Bolef and Menes in 1966 through samples of indium antimonide where nuclear spins were shown to absorb acoustic energy exhibited by the sample.

== Theory of nuclear acoustic resonance ==
=== Nuclear Spin and Acoustic Radiation ===
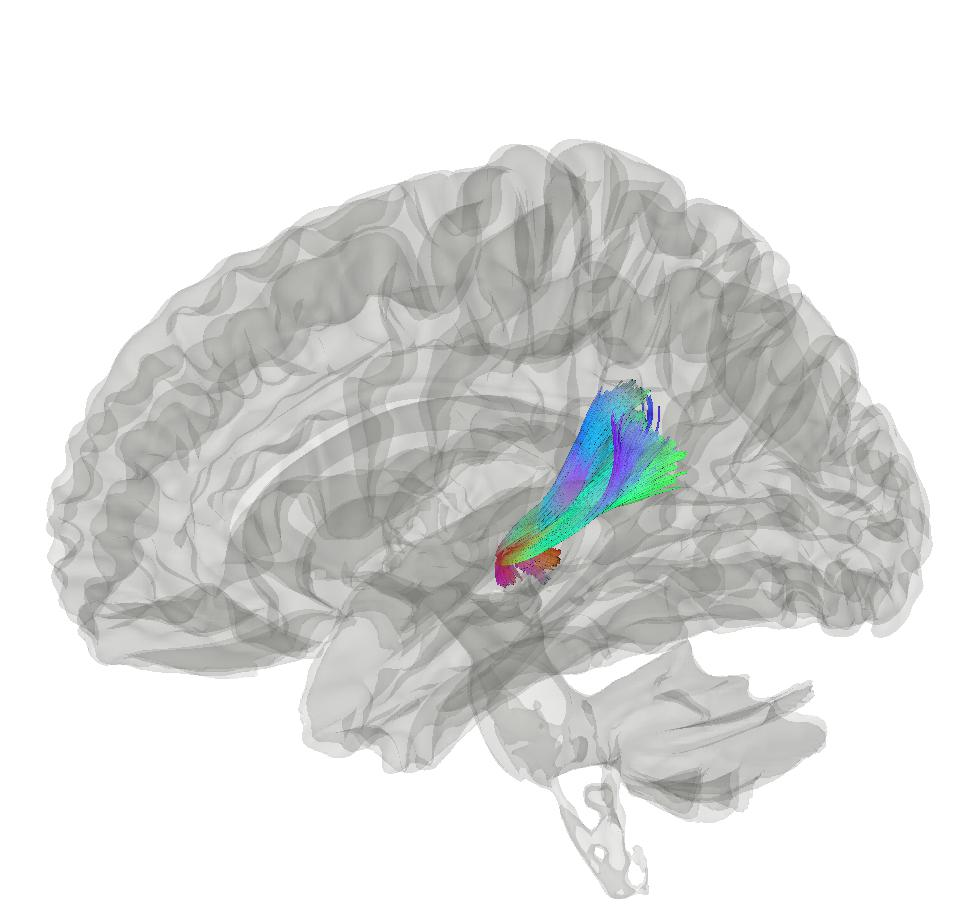
Example of a detected acoustic radiation from spectroscopy

The nuclei is deduced to spin due to its different properties ranging from magnetic to electric properties of different nuclei within atoms. Commonly this spin is utilized within the field of nuclear magnetic resonance, where an external RF (or ultra-high frequency range) magnetic field is used to excite and resonate with the nuclei spin within the internal system. This in turn allows the absorption or dispersion of electromagnetic radiation to occur, and allows magnetic resonance imaging equipment to detect and produce images. However, for nuclear acoustic resonance, the energy levels that determine the orientation of the spinning while under internal or external fields are transitioned by acoustic radiation. As acoustic waves are often between frequencies of 1 MHz and 100 MHz, they are usually characterized as ultrasound or ultrasonic (sound of frequencies above the audible range of $20-20,000 Hz$).

=== Comparison with Nuclear Magnetic Resonance ===
Similar to nuclear magnetic resonance, both phenomena introduces and utilizes external sources such as a DC magnetic field or different frequencies, and results from both methods produce similar data sets and trends in different variables. However, there are distinct differences in the methodologies of the two concepts. Nuclear acoustic resonance involves inducing internal spin-dependent interactions while nuclear magnetic resonance denotes interactions with external magnetic fields. Due to this, nuclear acoustic resonance is not solely dependent on nuclear magnetic resonance, and can be operated independently. Such cases where nuclear acoustic resonance is a better substitute for nuclear magnetic resonance include resonance in metals where electromagnetic waves can be difficult to penetrate and resonate, such as amorphous metals and alloys, while acoustic waves can easily pass through. However, the suitability for using nuclear acoustic resonance or nuclear magnetic resonance is reliant on the material to be used in order to achieve the most efficient and evident results.

=== Physics of Nuclear Acoustic Resonance ===
Nuclear acoustic resonance implements physics from both nuclear magnetic resonance and acoustics, involving the use of laws of quantum mechanics to derive theory on acoustic resonance in objects with nuclei that have a nonzero angular momentum (I), with its magnitude given by $\sqrt{I(I+1)}$. In elements where $I>1/2$, the characteristic of the nuclei spin also includes electric moments, also known as the electric quadrupole moment (denoted as $Q$) for the weakest electric moment. This moment ($I$) influences the electric field gradients within the nucleus as a result of surrounding charges relative to the nucleus. In effect, the results of nuclear magnetic resonance used to induce nuclear acoustic resonance is affected.

By utilizing the magnetic spin of nuclei under RF magnetic fields, and their spin-lattice relaxation properties after excitement from the external field to higher energy states, it is possible for acoustic waves to interact with nuclear spins, which often involves externally generated phonon. However, interactions of acoustic waves with nuclear spins do not guarantee the observation of acoustic resonance in objects. During the interactions, the acoustic waves experience a slight change in magnitude caused by the absorption by the object under nuclear spin, and the measurement of the change is crucial to observe and detect nuclear acoustic resonance in the object. Hence due to the difficulties analyzing nuclear acoustic resonance, it is only observed indirectly.

However, as further propositions are made, ultrasonic pulse-echo techniques are introduced to detect changes in acoustic attenuation in specimens during experiments due to its capability of detecting changes in solids around 1 part in $10^3$, which is capable of detecting background attenuation, although not for nuclear spin-phonon coupling, in which has attenuation coefficients from 10^{-7} to 10^{-8} dB/cm. Hence a combination of a continuous wave (CW) ultrasonic composite-resonator technique and nuclear magnetic resonance techniques is required to actually detect nuclear acoustic resonance.

== Nuclear Acoustic Resonance in Metals ==
Coherent or incoherent generated phonon entice the nuclear spins in nuclear acoustic resonance processes, and as a result is compared with the direct spin-lattice relaxation mechanism. Due to this, spins are de-excited from interactions with resonant thermal phonon at low frequencies, which is often denoted to be insignificant. This is certainly the case when compared with the indirect or Raman process where multiple phonon are involved. However, as the direct spin-lattice relaxation characterizes solids at specific temperatures due to formations of a small percentage of the lattice vibration spectrum, it is proposed that solids can be subjected to acoustic energy using ultrasound with energy ranging from 10^{10} to 10^{12} in terms of density greater than energy from the incoherent thermal phonon. From this theory, it is predicted that observations of nuclear spin can be achieved at high temperatures using nuclear acoustic resonance principles and techniques, unlike normal circumstances where they are only visible at low temperatures.

The initial direct observation of nuclear acoustic resonance occurred in 1963 with the use of samples of aluminum under an applied magnetic field, in which created an electromagnetic field that minimally affected the properties of the sound waves being used, specifically its velocity and attenuation. The experimental analysis deduced that the effects on velocity and attenuation by the external magnetic field was proportional to its square, which allowed the acoustic attenuation coefficient to be calculated for any nuclear spin systems undergoing absorption of acoustic energy, which is characterized as $\alpha_n$, where $\alpha = P_n / P_0$, with

$P_0 = 1/2 \rho v_s^3 \epsilon^2$

being the incident acoustic power per unit area. $P_0$ is determined by $\rho$ being the density of the metal, $v_s$ as the velocity of the propagated sound wave, and $\epsilon$ being the peak value of the strain.

Furthermore, $P_n$, the power per unit volume being absorbed by the system undergoing nuclear spin, is characterized by

$P_n = N(hv)^2/(2I+1)kT \sum_m W_{mm'}$

where N is the count of nuclear spins per unit volume of the metal, v is the frequency, and $W_{mm'}$ being the magnetic dipole coupling value. However, this formula does not factor in the effect of eddy currents on the metal caused by the magnetic fields. Nevertheless, the results of the experimental observation of nuclear acoustic resonance in aluminum devised propositions of further investigations in the field such as single crystals of metals with weak quadrupole moments and nuclear spins of 1/2.

== Nuclear Acoustic Resonance in Liquids ==
Due to the different properties of liquids when compared to solids, it is typically impossible to detect nuclear acoustic resonance in liquids due to difficulties when inducing resonance in liquids. In solids, the spin transitions of nuclear acoustic resonance are induced by two different coupling mechanisms. However, objects in the liquid state are strongly affected by their thermal properties, which also influences the dynamic electric field gradient, leading to a near impossibility of inducing nuclear acoustic resonance in liquids via the coupling method. Hence in the first experimental attempt to observe nuclear acoustic resonance in a liquid sample, a metallic specimen was used as the object of interest. Further experimentation led to usage of external factors such as using piezoelectric nano-particles to detect nuclear acoustic resonance in liquids, particularly in fluids.

Liquid gallium, which has properties similar to mercury

In the initial successful experimental investigation on nuclear acoustic resonance in liquid, a coherent electromagnetic wave inside the metal sample was produced by sound waves generated by external dc magnetic fields surrounding the metallic object; the generated sound wave resonate with the nuclear spins of the object, allowing nuclear acoustic resonance to be theoretically observed. The theoretical predictions were confirmed when samples of liquid gallium were observed and measured.

From this experimental observation, it was proposed that nuclear acoustic resonance in liquids metals requires magnetic dipole interactions due to the properties of liquids, and in which creates a dependence on the distance between particles in the liquid metal instead of the ultrasonic displacement field as seen in solids. Due to this, and the fact that the total displacement field for the generated electromagnetic field is the superposition of the displacement fields, the electromagnetic field can be modeled by a sum of the coherent and incoherent parts due to Maxwell's equations. Hence Unterhorst, Muller, and Schanz devised that nuclear acoustic resonance in liquid metals can be achieved and observed if the diffusion length during the relation time is relatively small compared to the ultrasonic wavelength of the sound wave.

== Imaging ==
By utilizing ultrasound acoustic waves via propagation onto objects such as patients, imaging is possible when resonance is achieved. This is then computed by a system of equipment that combines techniques and concepts from both ultrasound and magnetic resonance imaging to produce images for medical purposes.

However, due to the specific requirements of attaining nuclear acoustic resonance and the characteristics of ultrasound and magnetic resonance imaging, while imaging via nuclear acoustic resonance is achievable, experimentally limitations exist. Typical ultrasound techniques for imaging can obtain detection of acoustic attenuation differences of approximately 1 part in 1000, in which is not within the range of the required detection capability for nuclei spin systems which has acoustic coefficients from 10^{-7} to 10^{-8} dB/cm.

=== Harmonic Correlation ===
Although experimental nuclear acoustic resonance techniques on objects such as metals can achieve acoustic resonance, it is not a viable option for medical imaging, although it may be useful for spectroscopy in non-organic compounds. Hence the concept of harmonic correlation is introduced. This allows a new method of obtaining, amplifying, and analyzing acoustic signals. This method allows the sensitivity of the detection technique to be enhanced by implementing broadband signals into narrow-band signals for analysis. Harmonic correlation in general determines the correlation between the amplitude functions of two harmonically related narrow-band signals directed towards a patient, in which the assumption that they originate from the same source is made in order for the processing algorithm that collects that data and simulates them to boost the sensitivity of the signal detection of the analysis. Hence harmonic correlation clarifies the consequences of the absorption process of the induced nuclear spin phonon, however, such a process is very complicated and requires rigorous treatment of the data collected.

== See also ==
- Nuclear magnetic resonance
- Ultrasound
- Magnetic resonance imaging
- Resonance
- Relaxation (NMR)
- Electromagnetic radiation
- Spectroscopy
- Acoustic Resonance
- Acoustic Resonance Spectroscopy
