= Franck Laloë =

French quantum physicist (born 1940)

- Born: May 28, 1940 (age 86); Rabat, Morocco
- Education: École Polytechnique; University of Paris VI
- Known for: HAL; Quantum foundations
- Awards: Prix de l'État (1988); Prix des trois physiciens (2000)
- Scientific career
- Workplaces: CNRS; Kastler–Brossel Laboratory
- Thesis: Mise en évidence d'une orientation électronique dans les états excités de 3 He créés dans une décharge, lorsque l'état fondamental est orienté (1968)
- Website: www.phys.ens.fr/~laloe/

Franck Laloë (born May 28, 1940) is a French quantum physicist, author, and open archive initiator. He is emeritus research director at the French National Centre for Scientific Research (CNRS).

== Education and career ==
Laloë was born in Rabat, Morocco and studied physics at the École Polytechnique in Paris from 1960 to 1962. He studied at University of Paris VI (later Pierre and Marie Curie University) for a two-part doctorate. His PhD from 1963 to 1968 (Doctorat de troisième cycle) involved research on spin-polarized helium-3 systems. He obtained Doctorat d'État in 1970. He worked for the CNRS and became director from 1978. Later Laloë worked at the Kastler–Brossel Laboratory in Paris, where he was the director from 2004 to 2014.

Laloë is the initiator of the open archive for scientific works, HAL, created in 2001 at the Centre pour la communication scientifique directe (CCSD) of the CNRS. He deals with digital archiving on optical media (CD and DVD) and is president of a corresponding research group (GIS-DON).

Laloë's research deals with optical pumping, acoustics (including chaos), superfluid helium-3, foundations of quantum mechanics and ultracold quantum gases (Bose-Einstein condensates), as well as optical information storage technology. Laloë is co-author of Quantum Mechanics (French: Mécanique quantique), a popular series of quantum mechanics textbook with Bernard Diu and Claude Cohen-Tannoudji.

== Honors and awards ==
Laloë received the Prix de l'État from the French Academy of Sciences in 1988, the Prix Aimé Cotton in 1970 from the Société Française de Physique, and in 2000 the Prix des trois physiciens from the École Normale Supérieure in Paris and the Eugène Bloch Foundation.

== Bibliography ==
=== Books ===
- Laloë, Franck (1980). Spin Polarized Quantum Systems : Colloque International Du C.N.R.S., 21-26 Avril 1980 Aussois (France).
- Laloë, Franck (2019). Do We Really Understand Quantum Mechanics? (2nd ed.). Cambridge: Cambridge University Press. arXiv:quant-ph/0209123. Bibcode:2019dwru.book.....L. doi:10.1017/9781108569361. ISBN 978-1-108-47700-0.
- Cohen-Tannoudji, Claude; Diu, Bernard; Laloë, Franck (2020). Quantum mechanics, Volume 1: Basic Concepts, Tools, and Applications (2nd ed.). Weinheim, Germany. ISBN 978-3-527-34553-3. OCLC 1136491636.
- Cohen-Tannoudji, Claude; Diu, Bernard; Laloë, Franck (2020). Quantum mechanics, Volume 2: Angular Momentum, Spin, and Approximation Methods (2nd ed.). Weinheim, Germany. ISBN 978-3-527-34554-0. OCLC 1136491636.
- Cohen-Tannoudji, Claude; Diu, Bernard; Laloë, Franck (2020). Quantum mechanics, Volume 3: Fermions, Bosons, Photons, Correlations, and Entanglement (2nd ed.). Weinheim, Germany. ISBN 978-3-527-34555-7. OCLC 1136491636.
- Laloë, Franck (2023). Introduction to Continuous Symmetries — From Space-Time to Quantum Mechanics. Weinheim: Wiley-VCH. ISBN 978-3-527-41416-1.
- Hourcade, Jean-Charles; Laloë, Franck; Spitz, Erich (2020-11-04). Longévité de l'information numérique: Les données que nous voulons garder vont-elles s'effacer ?. EDP Sciences. doi:10.1051/978-2-7598-0846-5. ISBN 978-2-7598-0846-5. S2CID 234623556.

=== Chapters ===
- Laloë, Franck (2017), "The Pilot-Wave Theory: Problems and Difficulties", in d'Espagnat, Bernard; Zwirn, Hervé (eds.), The Quantum World, The Frontiers Collection, Cham: Springer International Publishing, pp. 165–193, doi:10.1007/978-3-319-55420-4_6, ISBN 978-3-319-55419-8
- Laloë, Franck (2022), "Quantum Mechanics is Routinely Used in Laboratories with Great Success, but No Consensus on its Interpretation has Emerged", The Oxford Handbook of the History of Quantum Interpretations, Oxford University Press, pp. 7–52, doi:10.1093/oxfordhb/9780198844495.013.0002 (inactive 12 July 2025), ISBN 9780198844495

=== Articles ===
- Laloë, Franck; Freed, Jack H. (1988). "The Effects of Spin in Gases". Scientific American. 258 (4): 94–101. Bibcode:1988SciAm.258d..94L. doi:10.1038/scientificamerican0488-94. ISSN 0036-8733. JSTOR 24989055.
- Laloë, Franck (2001). "Do we really understand quantum mechanics? Strange correlations, paradoxes, and theorems". American Journal of Physics. 69 (6): 655–701. arXiv:quant-ph/0209123. Bibcode:2001AmJPh..69..655L. doi:10.1119/1.1356698. ISSN 0002-9505.
- Laloë, Franck; Baruch, Pierre (2007). "Archives ouvertes : quels atouts ?". Pour la Science (in French).
- Laloë, Franck (2020). "A model of quantum collapse induced by gravity". The European Physical Journal D. 74 (2) 25. arXiv:1905.12047. Bibcode:2020EPJD...74...25L. doi:10.1140/epjd/e2019-100434-1. ISSN 1434-6060. S2CID 254133424.
