= Valentina Parigi =

Italian physicist

Valentina Parigi (born 1981) is a Italian physicist who works in France as a professor at the Sorbonne University and its Kastler–Brossel Laboratory, where she co-directs the Quantum Information Center. Her research concerns experimental and theoretical quantum optics, including multimode optics in quantum complex networks for applications in quantum computing.

== Education and career ==
Parigi was born in 1981, in Montevarchi. She has a Ph.D. from the European Laboratory for Non-Linear Spectroscopy of the University of Florence, supervised by Marco Bellini and completed in 2009.

From 2010 to 2015 she was a postdoctoral researcher at, successively, the Institut d'optique Graduate School in Paris, the Kastler–Brossel Laboratory, and the Langevin Institute of ESPCI Paris. She became an associate professor (maître de conférences) at the Kastler–Brossel Laboratory in 2015, and has been a full professor in 2023.

== Recognition ==
Parigi was a 2020 recipient of the CNRS Bronze Medal. She was elected as an Optica Fellow, in the 2027 class of fellows, "for internationally recognized contributions to multimode quantum optics, photonic quantum technologies, and leadership in experimental quantum information research and education".
