= Quantum Mechanics (book) =

Physics textbook

- Volume one (English version)
- Author: Claude Cohen-Tannoudji, Bernard Diu and Franck Laloë
- Original title: Mécanique quantique
- Language: French
- Subject: Quantum mechanics
- Published: 1973 (Vol. I and II); 2017 (Vol. III)
- Publisher: Collection Enseignement des Sciences
- Publication place: Paris, France

Quantum Mechanics (French: Mécanique quantique), often called the Cohen-Tannoudji, is a series of standard undergraduate-level quantum mechanics textbook written originally in French by Nobel laureate in Physics Claude Cohen-Tannoudji, Bernard Diu and Franck Laloë; in 1973. The first edition was published by Collection Enseignement des Sciences in Paris, and was translated to English by Wiley.

The book was originally divided into two volumes. A third volume was published in 2017.

The book structure is notable for having an extensive set of complementary chapters, introduced along with a "reader's guide", at the end of each main chapter.

== Table of contents ==
=== Vol. 1 ===
1. Waves and particles. Introduction to the ideas of quantum mechanics
2. Mathematical tools of quantum mechanics
3. The postulates of quantum mechanics
4. Applications of the postulates to simple cases: Spin-1/2 and two-level systems
5. The one dimensional harmonic oscillator
6. General properties of angular momentum in quantum mechanics
7. Particle in a central potential: the hydrogen atom

=== Vol. 2 ===
8. An elementary approach to the quantum theory of scattering by a potential
9. Electron spin
10. Addition of angular momenta
11. Stationary perturbation theory
12. An application of perturbation theory: The fine and hyperfine structure of the hydrogen atom
13. Approximation methods for time-dependent problems
14. Systems of identical particles
- Appendices

=== Vol. 3 ===
15. Creation and annihilation operators for identical particles
16. Field operator
17. Paired states of identical particles
18. Review of classical electrodynamics
19. Quantization of electromagnetic radiation
20. Absorption, emission and scattering of photons by atoms
21. Quantum entanglement, measurements, Bell's inequalities
- Appendices

== Reception ==
Bernd Crasemann, writing for the American Journal of Physics, praised the book for its clarity and its unusual structure that introduces the reader to intermediate topics. According to him, the "gems" of the book are the complements related to atomic, molecular, and optical physics; condensed matter physics and nuclear physics. The book has also been suggested as a complement to simplified introductory books in quantum mechanics.

Experimental physicist and 2022 Nobel laureate in Physics Alain Aspect has frequently mentioned that the book was a revelation early in his career, helping him better understand the research papers of quantum mechanics and the work of John Stewart Bell.

== See also ==
- Introduction to Quantum Mechanics, an undergraduate text by David J. Griffiths
- Modern Quantum Mechanics graduate book by J. J. Sakurai
- List of textbooks on classical mechanics and quantum mechanics
