= Jean Dausset =

French immunologist (1916–2009)

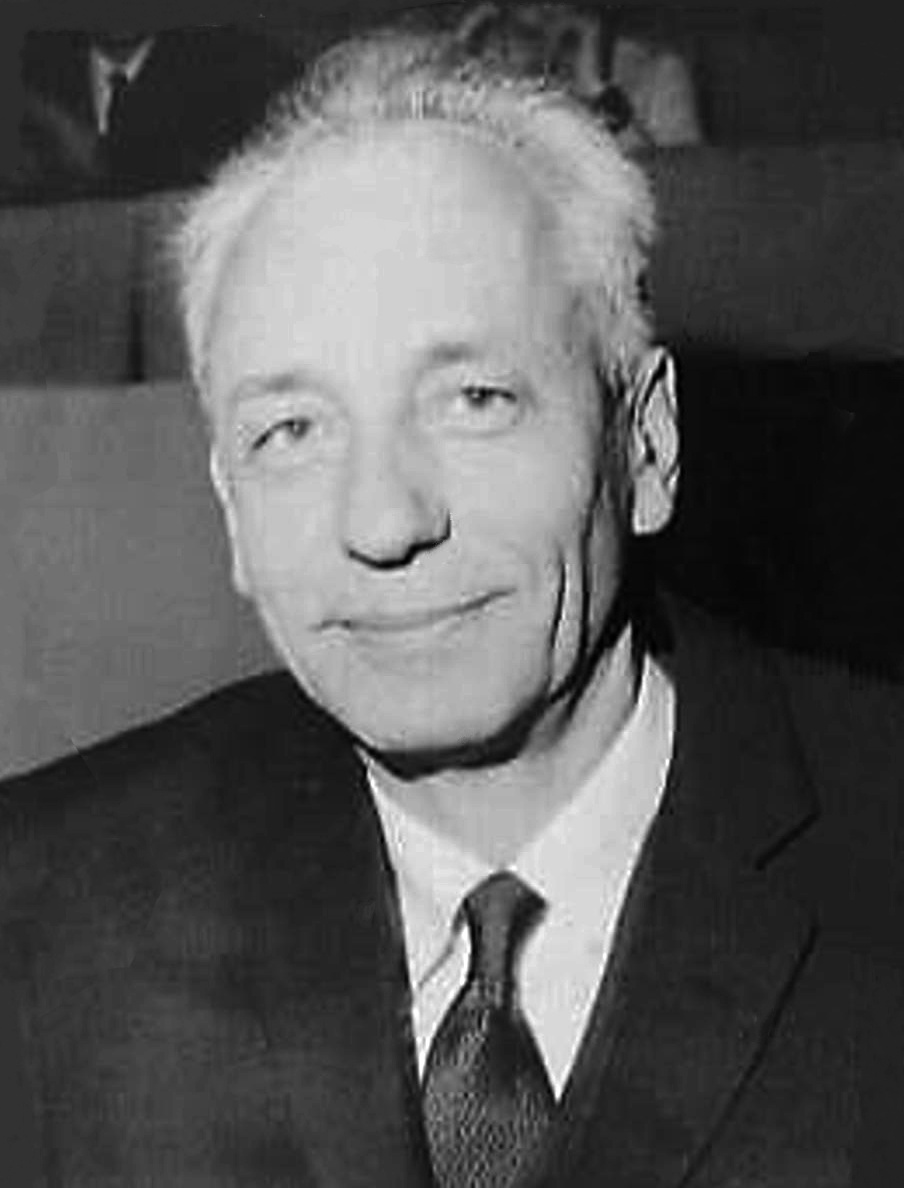
- Born: 19 October 1916; Toulouse, France
- Died: 6 June 2009 (aged 92); Palma de Mallorca, Spain
- Education: Lycée Michelet; University of Paris
- Known for: major histocompatibility complex, CEPH
- Spouse: Rose Mayoral
- Children: Two
- Awards: Nobel Prize in Physiology or Medicine (1980), Wolf Prize in Medicine (1978)
- Scientific career
- Fields: Immunology
- Workplaces: Free French Forces, North Africa; Boston Children's Hospital; Hôpital Saint-Louis, Paris; Institut National de la Santé et de la Recherche Médicale (INSERM)

Jean-Baptiste-Gabriel-Joachim Dausset (19 October 1916 – 6 June 2009) was a French immunologist born in Toulouse, France. Dausset received the Nobel Prize in Physiology or Medicine in 1980 along with Baruj Benacerraf and George Davis Snell for their discovery and characterisation of the genes making the major histocompatibility complex. Using the money from his Nobel Prize and a grant from the French Television, Dausset founded the Human Polymorphism Study Center (CEPH) in 1984, which was later renamed the Foundation Jean Dausset-CEPH in his honour. He married Rose Mayoral in 1963, with whom he had two children, Henri and Irène. Jean Dausset died on June 6, 2009, in Mallorca, Spain, at the age of 92.

== Early life ==
Jean-Baptiste-Gabriel-Joachim Dausset was born on 19 October 1916, in Toulouse, France. He was the youngest of four children of Henri Dausset and Elisabeth Dausset (born Renard). His father was from the Pyrénées, and was a doctor by profession, and his mother was a housewife from Lorraine. Following the end of World War I the Dausset family moved to Biarritz where Jean spent most of his childhood. His father was head doctor at the Bayonne Hospital, a position that would make a great impression on Jean. Dausset was home schooled by his mother, as well as by a tutor, who would periodically come to the house. At the age of 11, Dausset and his family moved to Paris. He began his formal schooling at the Lycée Michelet, at age 15. After earning his Baccalauréat in mathematics, Dausset was convinced by his father to study medicine at the University of Paris. Both of Dausset's parents died just after he became an extern at the Paris Hospitals, at the age of 19. Dausset failed to pass an internship entrance exam at the Paris Hospitals, and was preparing for a second attempt when World War II broke out.

=== War ===
Dausset was enlisted in the French army, and sent off to Northern Italy for a year. Upon his return to Paris in 1940, Dausset studied ardently and passed his medical internship exam. Soon after passing his exams, Dausset joined the Free French Forces in North Africa as an ambulance worker. He was originally stationed in Morocco, but was later sent to the more active Tunisia. Dausset got his first taste of hematology when he had to perform numerous blood transfusions on wounded soldiers. As the war was winding down in 1944, Dausset returned to Paris where he worked in the Regional Blood Transfusion Center at the Saint-Antoine Hospital.

== Medical reform ==
After the war, Dausset worked as an intern at the Paris Hospitals, which were in a state of disrepair and badly needed structural reform. Dausset formed a group of radical doctors who pushed for change in the French medical system. Due to his activist role in this group, Dausset was appointed as the Advisor to the Cabinet of the National Ministry of Education. The physician Robert Debré worked with Dausset, and pushed the government into forming a committee for the reform of medical education. Hospitals were joined with universities for the first time in France, and doctors were required to instruct classes to medical students. With the newly introduced system of university research hospitals, research began within the hospitals themselves, as opposed to in the universities alone, and full-time work for doctors was established (Debré reform of 11 and 30 December 1958).

== Career ==
After World War II Dausset worked with Professor Marcel Bessis who had developed a new transfusion technique called exchange transfusion. He worked as an immunohematologist and was interested in anaemic patients who required blood transfusions, he found that these patients lacked both red and white blood cells. In 1948, Dausset went to work as an intern in the Children's Hospital in Boston. He worked there in a hematology lab for about four years.

He returned to France in 1952 and once again took up the position of an intern with Marcel Bessis. It was during this time that Dausset conducted his first official research. With Bessis, Dausset discovered the first antigen-presenting leucocyte, but it was only officially described in 1958. Between the years 1952 and 1957 he collaborated with many researchers such as Gilbert Malinvaud and Jacques and Monique Colombani. From 1952 to 1957, majority of Dausset's time went into developing techniques and developing further ways of confirming the presence of certain antibodies. He was made the head of research at Professor Georges Marchal’s immunohematology laboratory in the Broussais Hospital. During this time, Dausset performed blood transfusions between a voluntary donor and patients in order to further his research in the field of immune responses in the body. He was testing the ability of the antigen-presenting leucocytes in the recipient’s body, which came originally from the donor’s blood. In 1958, Dausset discovered an antibody called MAC which was a leuco-agglutinate; the abbreviation MAC actually stands for the initials of the names of the donors whose blood Dausset and his colleagues had used during the research. From 1960 to 1965 Dausset worked primarily on improving organ transplantation techniques and the mechanisms involved in enhancing the body’s ability to accept the new tissue. To do this, Dausset again used the blood of voluntary donors and patients to see what differences lay in the blood of the two individuals and how to minimize these differences. 1965 was a crucial year for research. There was an intense competition amongst the researchers of the immunohematology field as everyone was on the brink of making a major discovery in the genetic and transplantation research. During this time, Dausset worked with Paul Ivany in Prague and they used leuco-agglutination and lymphocyte toxicity techniques to make some very significant discoveries. They discovered the Hu-1 antigen and the H-2 antigen.

In 1963 Jean Dausset became the head of the immunology at the Hôpital Saint-Louis in 1963. This is when he discovered the HLA system, with Felix Rapaport; by performing skin transplant experiments on volunteers and showed that success depended on histocompatibility. Dausset was the assistant director of the Research Institute in Blood diseases until 1968, he then became the director of the "Institut National de la Santé et de la Recherche Médicale"(INSERM) transplantation immunogenetics research unit. Dausset founded France Transplant and France Greffe de Moelle, which brings matching donor organs to recipients and provides bone marrow for transplant respectively.

== Research ==
Dausset began his research shortly after obtaining his medical degree in 1945, while working as an intern in the hematology lab at the Children’s Hospital in Boston. His first paper was published in 1950, and dealt with the detection of incomplete antibodies using trypsinized erythrocytes in a plasmatic medium, a technique that displayed improved sensitivity over other techniques used at the time. He went on to publish more works in the field of hematology, including developing a technique in 1952 for the removal of plasma from red blood cells to be used in transfusions to patients somehow intolerant of whole blood transfusions. In 1952 he returned to France and continued his research, particularly focusing on hemolytic anemia, and publishing several works dealing with various forms of blood cell agglutination. It was during this period of research, in 1954, when Dausset first observed an anti-leucocyte agglutinating substance, though it was not until 1958 that he identified an isoantibody specific to leucocytes, and published his findings. It was this finding and the extensive cascade of work that followed that would ultimately earn Dausset his Nobel Prize.

General research in antibodies, agglutination, and anemia continued in the years following this 1958 paper. In 1962, Dausset published an examination of the correlation between leuco-agglutination and skin graft tolerance, his first observation of the antigens’ impact on histocompatibility. His next paper on the subject was published in 1964, when he observed a clear relationship between leucocyte antigen compatibility and antibody response to skin grafts. This finding sparked a flurry of research in the topic of histocompatibility, and by the end of 1965 Dausset had published over a dozen papers exploring leucocyte antigens and their relevance to histocompatibility. After identifying that a two-allele leucocyte antigen group had an influence on histocompatibility and observing the induction of hyper-sensitivity to skin grafts following injection of leucocyte fractions, Dausset developed a system for grouping leucocyte antigens on the basis of histocompatibility. Following this, he put forth the hypothesis that all known leucocyte antigens were part of a single complex, a complex which he named Hu-1. This complex would later become known as one of the major histocompatibility complexes (MHCs), specifically those termed human leucocyte antigens (HLAs). Dausset's further work in 1965 examining the effects of Hu-1 antigen injection on skin graft rejection further confirmed the conclusion that this Hu-1 complex was indeed a transplantation antigen, a conclusion which would in time have profound effects on the transplantation process.

In the years to come, Dausset continued his research on the Hu-1 complex. Through 1966-1967 he published several more papers on the subject, including a paper summarizing the relevance of Hu-1 antigens to oncogenesis and transplantation, development of the use of a platelet complementation fixation test to identify which antigens are present, and the discovery that Hu-1 is homologous to the mouse H-2 complex, which also functions in histocompatibility. Toward the end of 1967 he confirmed through familial studies that all discovered antigens were in fact part of a single system. Following 1967, Dausset participated in numerous other studies pertaining to the complex (which was renamed HLA in 1968), particularly those examining the genetic basis for the antigens’ transmission, along with publishing a number of other papers for which he claimed primary authorship. For his contribution to these studies as well as his ultimate role in the discovery of this crucial antigen, Jean Dausset received the Nobel Prize in Physiology and Medicine in 1980.

Following his reception of the Nobel Prize, Dausset's personal research slowed considerably. He contributed to multiple studies, particularly a number relating to genetics, but did not publish anything for which he claimed primary authorship for over a decade. He retired in 2003, at the age of 87.

== Nobel Prize ==
In 1975, Dausset suspected that his name had been entered in the nominations for the Nobel Prize. However, nothing came of this until February 1980, when rumours were circulating in the scientific community about his possible candidacy. At this point, Dausset was planning on going to Quebec, Canada to do a conference series throughout the province. He was in a dilemma because if did win, he did not want to be away from his family and colleagues, and yet, were he to stay in France, people would suspect that he was sure of winning and he might set himself up for disappointment. So instead, he decided to stay in Paris, but to stay out of the public eye. He was unsurprisingly awarded the Nobel Prize 1980, which he shared with Baruj Benacerraf and George Davis Snell.

== Later life ==
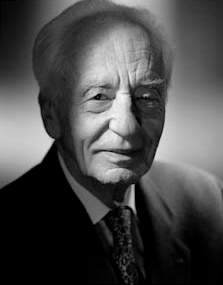
Dausset in 2005

In 1984 Dausset founded the Centre D’étude du Polymorphisme Humain (CEPH), aiming to detect the major genes in humans that are responsible for diseases outside the HLA system. Localization of these genes was a crucial step in cloning and identifying them, this was a breakthrough for medical genetics. The CEPH system contributed DNA from 61 large families to international centers that were responsible for mapping the human genome. Dausset and professor LL Cavalli-Sforza collaborated, and developed a DNA resource from world populations known as HGDP-CEPH diversity panel, to be used in human population genetics. CEPH is a non-profit organisation that was partly funded by the French government, it was not until 1993, that CEPH was renamed the Foundation Jean Dausset-CEPH. In 2003, at the age of 87, Dausset retired and became the president of CEPH.

Dausset was a member of the French Academy of Sciences. He was also a professor at the college de France. Dausset was one of the influential foreign members of the National Academy of Sciences, US, and an honorary member of the American Academy of Arts and Sciences. He was a member of the founding Council and Vice President of the Human Genome Organization. Dausset received various prestigious prizes, such as the Landsteiner Award and prizes for the Koch and Wolf Foundations. He also served on the advisory boards of numerous research institutions.
