= Marcel Bessis =

French physician and scientist

- Photo of Bessis, date unknown
- Born: November 15, 1917; Tunis, Tunisia
- Died: March 28, 1994 (aged 76); Paris, France
- Education: University of Paris (MD, 1944)
- Spouse: Claude Desserteaux (m. 1952)
- Children: 3
- Awards: Knight of the Legion d'Honneur (1967); Member, French Academy of Sciences (1979); Member, Académie royale de Médecine de Belgique (1991); Commander of the Ordre national du Mérite; Officer of the Ordre des Arts et des Lettres
- Scientific career
- Fields: Hematology
- Workplaces: Centre national de transfusion sanguine University of Paris; INSERM; Hôpital de la Salpêtrière

Marcel Claude Bessis (15 November 1917 – 28 March 1994) was a French physician known for research on blood cells.

Bessis was born in Tunis on 15 November 1917. He was educated at the Lycée Janson-de-Sailly in Paris, France. He developed an interest in microscopy in his teenage years and went on to study medicine at the University of Paris. During the Second World War, he served as a military physician and pioneered the technique of exchange transfusion to treat war injuries. He graduated with a medical degree in 1944. Later he studied exchange transfusion as a treatment for hemolytic disease of the newborn, uremia and acute leukemia. He was a frequent collaborator of Jean Bernard.

Bessis used electron microscopy and microcinematography to study the structure and function of blood cells—particularly red blood cells, but also platelets and white blood cells, including the abnormal cells found in leukemia. He invented new instruments to aid his research and developed techniques for manipulating cells using laser microbeams. Maxwell Wintrobe credited Bessis with coining the terms stomatocyte, echinocyte and discocyte. Bessis wrote that "The doctor who knows how to see can recognize in a red cell the subtle alteration of a gene transmitted from time immemorial on the banks of the Congo River or the marks of aggressions of daily life. This form speaks a difficult language but one that can be entirely deciphered."

From 1946 to 1980, Bessis was editor-in-chief of the Nouvelle revue d'hématologie. In 1948 he was appointed director of research at the Centre national de transfusion sanguine (National Centre of Blood Transfusion), serving in that role until 1966, when he became the founding director of the Institut de Pathologie cellulaire (Institute of Cell Pathology) at INSERM. He began working as a professor of hematology at the University of Paris in 1961, becoming full professor in 1972. Bessis was appointed editor-in-chief of Blood Cells in 1975, and from 1986 until his death in 1994 was a co-director of the Centre de recherches sur l'écologie des cellules du sang at the Hôpital de la Salpêtrière.

In 1967, Bessis was named a knight of the Legion d'Honneur. He was also a commander of the Ordre national du Mérite and an officer of the Ordre des Arts et des Lettres. He was elected to the French Academy of Sciences in 1979 and the Académie royale de Médecine de Belgique in 1991. He was an honorary president of the Société française d'hématologie.

Bessis married Claude Desserteaux in 1952; the couple raised three children. Bessis died in Paris on 28 March 1994.

== Bibliography ==
Some of Bessis's published works include:

- La maladie hémolytique du nouveau-né et la pathologie de l'enfant liée à l'iso-immunisation de la mère (1947)
- Cytologie sanguine normale et pathologique (1948)
- Traité de cytologie sanguine (English translation, 1956)
- Traité de microscopie : instruments et techniques (with Albert Policard and Marcel Locquin, 1957)
- Le sang et la transfusion sanguine (1958)
- Hématologie clinique (with Jean Bernard, 1958)
- Abrégé d'hématologie (with Jean Bernard, 1963)
- Éléments de pathologie cellulaire (with Albert Policard, 1969)
- Les cellules du sang normal et pathologique (1972; English translation published in 1973)
- Corpuscules : essai sur la forme de globules rouges humains (1976)
- Réinterprétation des frottis sanguins (1976)
