= Alfred Kastler =

German-born French physicist (1902–1984)

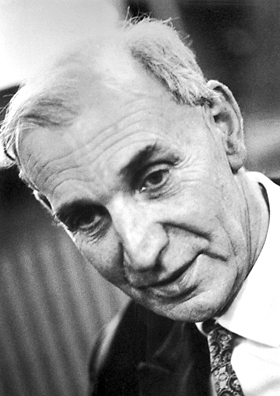
- Kastler in 1966
- Born: 3 May 1902; Guebwiller, Alsace–Lorraine, German Empire
- Died: 7 January 1984 (aged 81); Bandol, Provence-Alpes-Côte d'Azur, France
- Education: École Normale Supérieure
- Known for: Optical pumping Nuclear acoustic resonance
- Awards: Holweck Prize (1954); CNRS Gold medal (1964); Nobel Prize in Physics (1966)
- Scientific career
- Fields: Physics
- Workplaces: University of Bordeaux
- Doctoral advisor: Pierre Daure
- Doctoral students: Claude Cohen Tannoudji

Alfred Kastler (French: [kastlɛʁ]; 3 May 1902 – 7 January 1984) was a German-born French physicist and Nobel laureate in Physics. He is known for the development of optical pumping.

== Biography ==
Kastler was born in Guebwiller (Alsace, at the time part of the German Empire), and became a French citizen when Alsace reverted to France at the end of World War I. He attended the Lycée Bartholdi in Colmar, Alsace, and then École Normale Supérieure in Paris in 1921. After his studies, he began teaching physics at the Lycée of Mulhouse in 1926, and then taught at the University of Bordeaux, where he was a university professor until 1941. Georges Bruhat asked him to come back to the École Normale Supérieure, where he finally obtained a chair in 1952.

Collaborating with Jean Brossel, he researched quantum mechanics, the interaction between light and atoms, and spectroscopy. Kastler, working on combination of optical resonance and magnetic resonance, developed the technique of "optical pumping". Those works led to the completion of the theory of lasers and masers.

In 1962, he received the first C.E.K Mees Medal from the Optical Society of America, and he was elected an Honorary member of the Society. The following year, he was elected a Fellow.

He won the Nobel Prize in Physics in 1966 "for the discovery and development of optical methods for studying Hertzian resonances in atoms".

He was president of the board of the Institut d'optique théorique et appliquée and served as the first chairman of the non-governmental organization (NGO) Action Against Hunger.

Kastler also wrote poetry (in German). In 1971 he published Europe, ma patrie: Deutsche Lieder eines französischen Europäers (i.e. Europe, my fatherland: German songs of a French European).

In 1976, Kastler was elected to the American Philosophical Society.

In 1978 he became foreign member of the Royal Netherlands Academy of Arts and Sciences.

In 1979, Kastler was awarded the Wilhelm Exner Medal.

== Laboratoire Kastler-Brossel ==
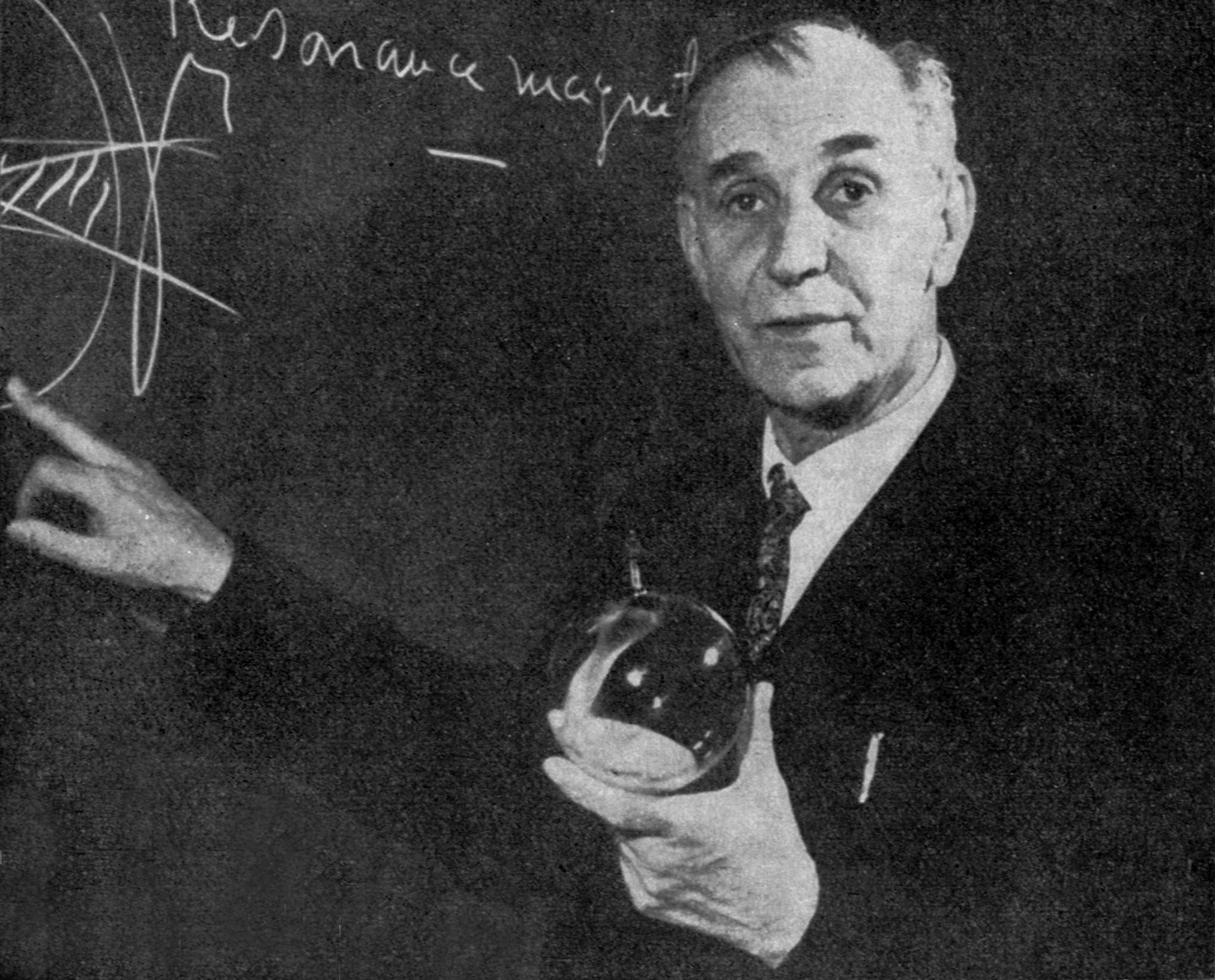
Kastler ca. 1967

Professor Kastler spent most of his research career at the Ecole Normale Supérieure in Paris where he started after the war a small research group on spectroscopy with his student, Jean Brossel.

Over the forty years that followed, this group trained many young physicists, including Nobel laureates Claude Cohen Tannoudji and Serge Haroche, and had a significant impact on the development of atomic physics in France. The Laboratoire de Spectroscopie hertzienne was renamed Laboratoire Kastler-Brossel in 1994. It has part of its laboratories in Université Pierre et Marie Curie but mainly at the École Normale Supérieure.

== Global policy ==
He was one of the signatories of the agreement to convene a convention for drafting a world constitution. As a result, for the first time in human history, a World Constituent Assembly convened to draft and adopt the Constitution for the Federation of Earth.

== Personal life ==
Tomb of Alfred Kastler

In December 1924, Kastler married Elise Cosset, a teacher. They had three children, Daniel, Claude-Yves, and Mireille. His sons became teachers, and Mireille became a doctor.

== Death ==
Professor Kastler died on 7 January 1984, in Bandol, France.

== See also ==
- Acoustic paramagnetic resonance
