= Elisabeth Giacobino =

French physicist (born 1946)

- Born: April 2, 1946 (age 80); France
- Education: Université Paris VI
- Known for: Laser Physics, Non-Linear Optics, Quantum Optics and Super-Fluidity
- Awards: Gay-Lussac Humboldt
- Scientific career
- Fields: Physics
- Workplaces: French National Center for Scientific Research
- Thesis: Etude des niveaux excités du néon par spectroscopie laser sans effet Doppler (1976)
- Doctoral advisor: J. Brossel

Elisabeth Giacobino (born April 2, 1946) is a French physicist specialized in laser physics, nonlinear optics, quantum optics and super-fluidity. She is one of the pioneers of quantum optics and quantum information. She graduated from Pierre and Marie Curie University (Paris VI) and started working at the French National Centre for Scientific Research, where she has spent the majority of her professional career. She has been an invited professor at New York University and University of Auckland. She has over 230 publications and over 110 invited presentations in international conferences. She has been the coordinator of four European projects and is a member of Academia Leopoldina as well as a fellow member of the European Physical Society, the European Optical Society and the Optical Society of America.

== Education and career ==
Elisabeth studied from 1965 to 1969 at the École Normale Supérieure, then in 1969 she got her Agrégation in Physical Sciences and in 1976 she got her Doctorate Degree in Physics, specializing in Atomic Physics and Optics at the Université Paris VI. Her PhD Thesis was on the "Study of Excited Neon Levels by Laser Spectroscopy without Doppler Effect". From 1969 to 1976 she worked as a Junior Researcher (Attaché de Recherche) at the French National Center for Scientific Research ("Centre National de la Recherche Scientifique", CNRS). Then, from 1976 to 1982 she worked as a full researcher at the CNRS. From 1982 to 1983 she was an invited professor at New York University. From 1982 to 2002 she worked as a research director at CNRS. From 2003 to 2006 she was the Director of Research at the Ministry of Education, Higher Education and Research. Then from 2006 to 2011 she returned as Research Director at CNRS. From 2011 to the present she is a Research Director Emerite at CNRS.

As part of her involvement to advocate for the future of young physicists, in 2008 she was part of a group of scientists that made the written statement La situation des femmes physiciennes en France, during the Third International Conference on Women in Physics (ICWIP2008) on which they analyzed the current situation of female physicists in France and made recommendations to improve the current state.

== Research and contributions ==
Elisabeth Giacobino has had a prolific career with over 230 publications and over 110 invited presentations in international conferences. Over the last 50 years, her research contributions has been to several areas of research. From 1970 to 1987 she worked on laser spectroscopy and Doppler-free two-photon spectroscopy in rare gases and alkali vapours, collisional effects, nonlinear effect and optical bi-stability. From 1985 to 1995 she worked mostly in quantum optics. In 1987 she demonstrated, for the first time, two-beam squeezing generated by a parametric oscillator. From 1990 to 1998 her research focused on noise studies in semi-conductor lasers and in micro-lasers. From 1990–2003 she worked on quantum state generation with cold atoms. In 1995, with the use of a cloud of laser-cooled atoms, she proposed a new method to generate squeezed light; and in 2003, a new method to generate entangled beams of light. In 2005 she started working on electromagnetically induced transparency, light matter entanglement and development of quantum memories in atomic ensembles. After demonstrating the capability of vapours to store quantum states of light, she started working on quantum memory register based on a cold atom cloud.

From 1998 to the present she has been working on semiconductor microcavities and on the study of nonlinear and bi-stable behavior. In passive semiconductor microcavities, she demonstrated, for the first time, the emission of squeezed light and correlated beams. From 2001 to the present she has been involved in the studies of semiconductor nano-crystals, specifically on single photon generation and cavity quantum electrodynamics (QED) effects. In this line of research, concerning semiconductor systems, she studied intensity quantum noise in semiconductor lasers and explained how to reduced it.

== Research management ==
She was the coordinator of four European Projects and a partner with several of them. She has held several positions in the management of research in France, specially at the French National Centre for Scientific Research (CNRS) and at the Ministry of Higher Education and Research. From 1992 to 1995 she was appointed expert for the atomic and molecular physics, and optics at the Mathematics and Physics Department of CNRS. From 1994 to 1997 she was the deputy director of the Kastle Brossel Laboratory. From 1995 to 1999 she was the deputy director of the Mathematics and Physics Department at CNRS. From 1995 to 2000 she was appointed expert for the European Commission as a member of the Physics Panel for individual (Marie Curie) fellowships and in 2000 chairperson for the Training Sites. From 1996 to 2001 she was an elected member of the "Conseil National des Universités". From 1997 to 2001 she was a member of the Commission of Specialist from l'Université Paris VII. From 1999–2001 she was the Director of the Kastler Brossel Laboratory. From 2001 to 2002 she was the director of the Mathematics and Physics Department at CNRS. From 2002 to 2006 she was the General Director of Research at the Ministry of Higher Education and Research. From 2006 to 2010 she was the Head of Interdisciplinary Programs at CNRS and Advisor to the Director General at CNRS.

From 2006 to the present she has worked as the President of the National Network for Complex Systems. From 2009 to 2012 she was the chair of the jury for Natural Sciences at the Institut Universitaire de France (IUF). From 2006 to the present she has worked as the President of the Institute of Optics, Graduate School. From 2015 to the present she has been an advisor to the ANR, the French National Research Agency, in the areas of Quantum Technologies.

== Notable publications ==
- Amo, Alberto; Lefrère, Jérôme; Pigeon, Simon; Adrados, Claire; Ciuti, Cristiano; Carusotto, Lacopo; Houdré, Romuald; Giacobino, Elisabeth; Bramati, Alberto (2009). "Superfluidity of polaritons in semiconductor microcavities". Nature Physics. 5 (11): 805–810. arXiv:0812.2748. Bibcode:2009NatPh...5..805A. doi:10.1038/nphys1364.
- Heidmann, A.; Horowicz, R.J.; Reynaud, S.; Giacobino, E.; Fabre, C.; Camy, G. (1987). "Observation of Quantum Noise-Reduction on Twin Laser-beams". Physical Review Letters. 59 (22): 2555–2557. Bibcode:1987PhRvL..59.2555H. doi:10.1103/PhysRevLett.59.2555. PMID 10035582.
- Fabre, Claude; Pinard, Michel; Bourzeix, Sophie; Heidmann, Antoine; Giacobino, Elisabeth; Reynaud, Serge (1994). "Quantum-noise reduction using a cavity with a movable mirror". Physical Review A. 49 (2): 1337–1343. Bibcode:1994PhRvA..49.1337F. doi:10.1103/PhysRevA.49.1337. PMID 9910367.
- Ballarini, Dario; De Giorgi, Milena; Cancellieri, Emiliano; Houdré, Romuald; Giacobino, Elisabeth; Cingolani, Roberto; Bramati, Alberto; Gigli, Giuseppe; Sanvitto, Daniele (2013). "All-optical polariton transistor". Nature Communications. 4 (1): 1778. arXiv:1201.4071. Bibcode:2013NatCo...4.1778B. doi:10.1038/ncomms2734. PMID 23653190.
- Amo, Alberto; Liew, TCH; Adrados, Claire; Houdré, Romuald; Giacobino, Elisabeth; Kavokin, AV; Bramati, A. (2010). "Exciton–polariton spin switches". Nature Photonics. 4 (6): 361. Bibcode:2010NaPho...4..361A. doi:10.1038/nphoton.2010.79.
- Leyder, Charles; Romanelli, Marco; Karr, J Ph; Giacobino, Elisabeth; Liew, Tim CH; Glazov, Mikhail M; Kavokin, Alexey V; Malpuech, Guillaume; Bramati, Alberto (2007). "Observation of the optical spin Hall effect". Nature Physics. 3 (9): 628–631. Bibcode:2007NatPh...3..628L. doi:10.1038/nphys676.
- Jain, Prashant K; Amirav, Lilac; Aloni, Shaul; Alivisatos, A Paul (2010). "Nanoheterostructure cation exchange: anionic framework conservation". Journal of the American Chemical Society. 132 (29): 9997–9999. doi:10.1021/ja104126u. PMID 20593896. S2CID 207053895.
- Messin, Gaetan; Hermier, Jean-Pierre; Giacobino, Elisabeth; Desbiolles, Pierre; Dahan, Maxime (2001). "Bunching and antibunching in the fluorescence of semiconductor nanocrystals". Optics Letters. 26 (23): 1891–1893. Bibcode:2001OptL...26.1891M. doi:10.1364/OL.26.001891. PMID 18059728. S2CID 1220421.
- Josse, Vincent; Dantan, Aurelien; Bramati, Alberto; Pinard, Michel; Giacobino, Elisabeth (2004). "Continuous variable entanglement using cold atoms". Physical Review Letters. 92 (12) 123601. arXiv:quant-ph/0306152. Bibcode:2004PhRvL..92l3601J. doi:10.1103/PhysRevLett.92.123601. PMID 15089670. S2CID 32957806. 123601.
- Cviklinski, J.; Ortalo, J.; Laurat, J.; Bramati, A.; Pinard, M.; Giacobino, E. (2008). "Reversible Quantum Interface for Tunable Single-Sideband Modulation". Physical Review Letters. 101 (13) 133601. arXiv:0711.0264. Bibcode:2008PhRvL.101m3601C. doi:10.1103/PhysRevLett.101.133601. PMID 18851447. S2CID 31656565. 133601.

== Awards ==
- 1990 – Fabry - de Gramont Prize
- 2002 – Chevalier de la Légion d'Honneur
- 2009 – Member of the German Academy, Academia Leopoldina
- 2009 – Fellow of the European Optical Society (EOS)
- 2010 – Fellow of the European Physical Society (EPS)
- 2010 – Fellow of the Optical Society of America (OSA)
- 2011 – Prix Robin, Award of the French Physical Society
- 2012 – Gay-Lussac Humboldt Prize
