= Blood Cells, Molecules and Diseases =

- Discipline: Hematology
- Language: English
- Edited by: Mohandus Narla

Publication details
- Former name: Blood Cells
- History: 1975–present
- Publisher: Elsevier
- Frequency: 8/year
- Open access: Hybrid
- Impact factor: 2.331 (2013)

Standard abbreviations
- ISO 4: Blood Cells Mol. Dis.

Indexing
- CODEN: BCMDFX
- ISSN: 1079-9796 (print); 1096-0961 (web)
- OCLC no.: 31631706

Links
- Journal homepage; Online access

Blood Cells, Molecules and Diseases is a peer-reviewed medical journal covering hematology. It was established in 1975 as Blood Cells and obtained its current title in 1995. The editor-in-chief is Mohandus Narla. It is published eight times per year by Elsevier.

== Abstracting and indexing ==
The journal is abstracted and indexed in:

- Academic OneFile
- BIOSIS Previews
- Chemical Abstracts
- Current Contents/Life Sciences
- Embase
- Index Medicus/MEDLINE/PubMed
- Science Citation Index
- Scopus
- Sociedad Iberoamericana de Informacion Cientifica (SIIC) databases

According to the Journal Citation Reports, the journal had a 2013 impact factor of 2.331, ranking it 39th out of 68 journals in the category "Hematology".
