= Albert Policard =

French military surgeon

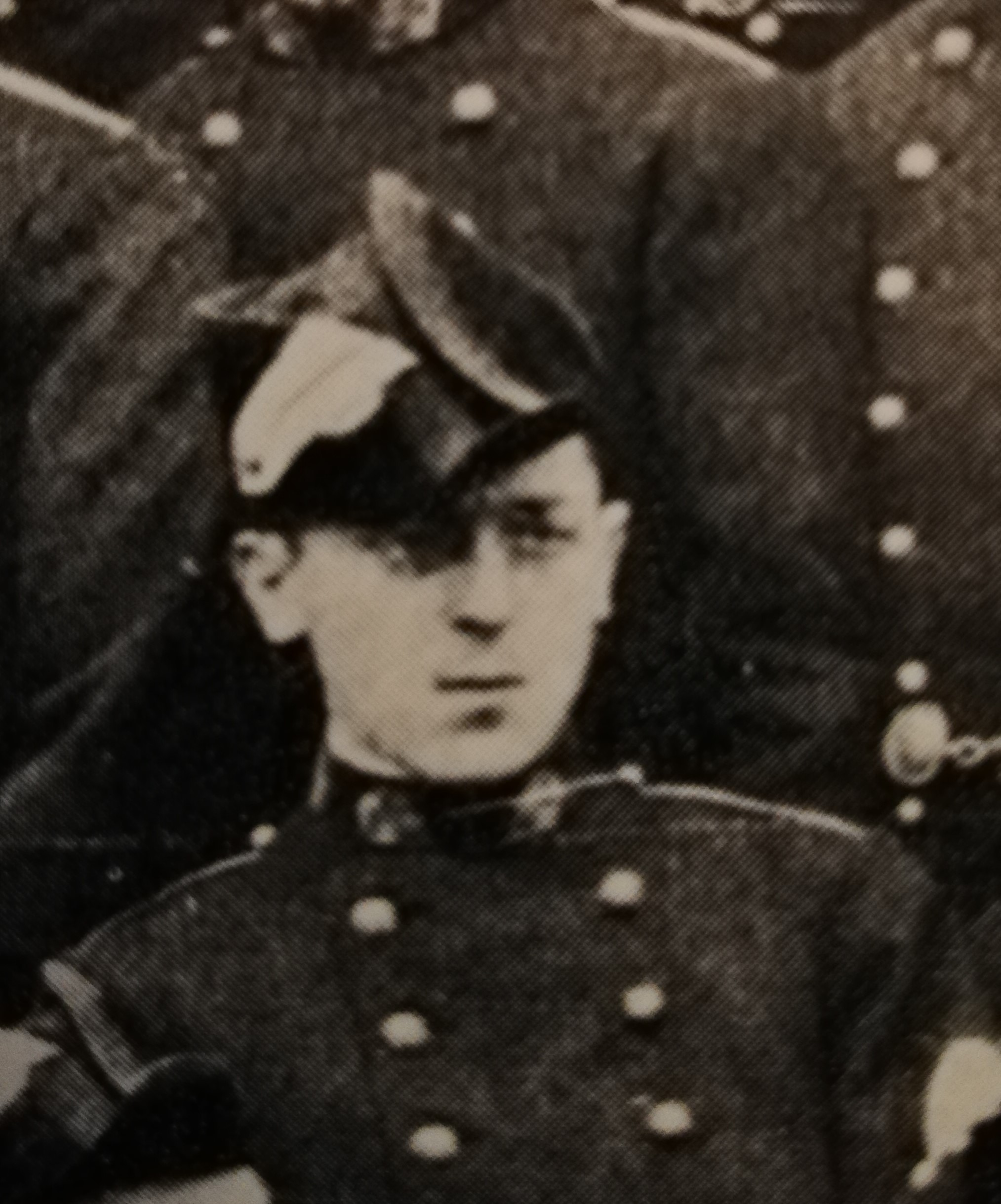
- Albert Policard
- Born: 15 January 1881; 10th arrondissement of Paris, France
- Died: 1 March 1972 (aged 91); 6th arrondissement of Paris, France
- Occupations: Military doctor, professor of histology
- Spouse: Jeanne Lacassagne (m. 1909)
- Family: Alexandre Lacassagne (father-in-law)

Albert Policard (15 January 1881 in Paris – 1 March 1972 in Paris) was a French military doctor and professor of histology at the Faculty of Medicine and Pharmacy in Lyon. He focused on research in pathological anatomy over several decades. He is considered the father of French pathological anatomy.

== Biography ==
Albert Policard was born in Paris to Marie René Augustin Policard, a woodcarving artist, and Pauline Léontine Archambault. In 1898, he enrolled at the Faculty of Science and in 1899 at the Faculty of Medicine in Paris. As the second of seven children, he had to finance his studies, so he decided to enrol at the École du service de santé militaire in Lyon, which he entered on 25 October 1900. He collaborated with Joseph Renaut, a student of Louis-Antoine Ranvier, who ran the histology laboratory at Lyon's Faculty of Medicine and Pharmacy, where he was the first professor to hold the chair of Histology, and whose associate was Claudius Regaud, the father of experimental histology.

In 1903, he defended his medical doctorate thesis, titled The elimination by the normal kidney of foreign coloring matter to the body (French: L'élimination par le rein normal des matières colorantes étrangères à l'organisme). Following a one-year internship at Val-de-Grâce, Albert Policard was assigned to the 2nd Dragoon Regiment in Lyon's Part-Dieu barracks in 1905, where he rose to the rank of medical assistant-major first class (lieutenant) by 1906. Returning to Lyon, he resumed research with Joseph Renaut and Claudius Regaud until 1907. While maintaining his interest in histology, he expanded into physiology and experimental medicine, joining Jean-Pierre Morat's physiology laboratory in 1907 to begin his scientific thesis work. In 1910, he became a major medical second class (captain) and was appointed as a supervisor at the Military Health School's laboratory for the XIVth Army Corps. He defended his doctoral thesis in natural sciences at the Faculty of Sciences in Paris in 1912, focusing on the frog kidney's function.

He married Jeanne Lacassagne on October 2, 1909, in Villerest near Roanne. Jeanne was the daughter of Alexandre Lacassagne, a renowned pioneer of forensic medicine.

Albert Policard became an associate professor of histology at the Faculty of Medicine in Lyon in 1913 and requested to be released from his military duties, which was granted effective September 1, 1913.

Recalled to service on August 2, 1914, at the outbreak of war, Albert Policard became the chief physician of Ambulance 13/13 in the 1st Army. In 1915, he commanded the hygiene and prophylaxis section of the 13th Army Corps. In May 1917, Albert Policard joined the auto-surgery unit 20, and in July, he was summoned by Claudius Regaud to lead the Groupement des Services Chirurgicaux et Scientifiques at the original Hospital of Stages (HOE) in Prouilly, later relocated to Bouleuse (Marne) near Reims.

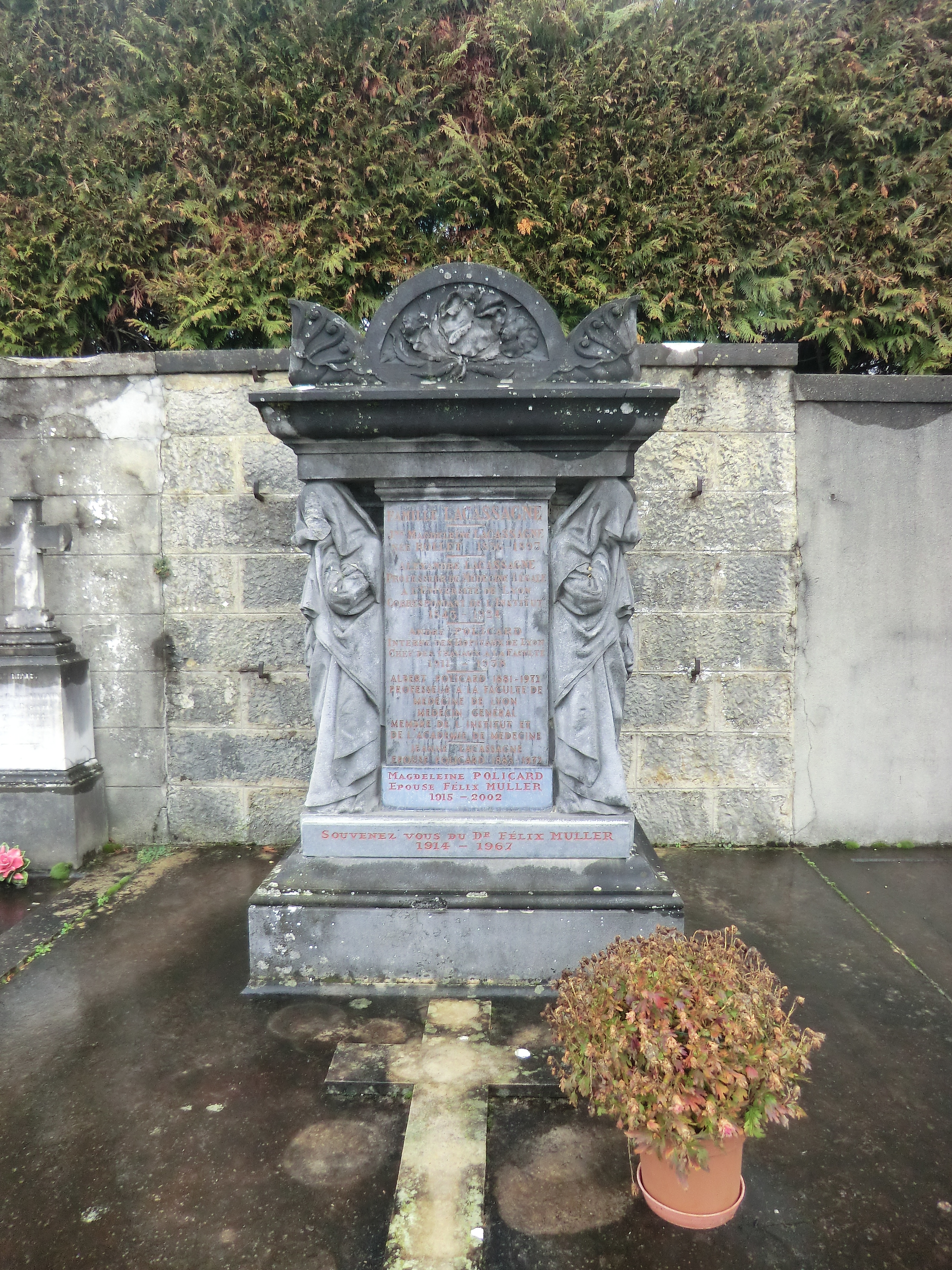
Tomb of the Lacassagne-Policard family in Beynost.

== Honors ==
Albert Policard became a member of the National Academy of Medicine in 1942 and a member of the Academy of Sciences in 1963. He was awarded the Prix de l'État in 1961. He held the rank of Commander of the Legion of Honor since 1959 and was a recipient of the Croix de Guerre 1914–1918. In the area shared by the municipalities of Roanne, Riorges, and Villerest (where the Lacassagne family owned a summer house called La Léva), a recent street and an alley serving a housing development were named after Albert Policard.

== Personal life ==
Albert and Jeanne Policard had two children. Their son André, born in 1911, was a medical intern and lecturer at the faculty, he died in 1938. Their daughter Magdeleine (1915–2002), a doctor of law, married Félix Muller, who was murdered in 1967 by one of his patients with dementia. They had four children.

Albert and Jeanne Policard (who died shortly after her husband in 1972), as well as their two children, are buried in the family vault of the Lacassagne family in Beynost.

== Selected works ==
Albert Policard published many works, including 26 books either alone or in collaboration with his students:

- Albert Policard. L'Évolution de la Plaie de Guerre: Mécanismes Biologiques Fondamentaux. Paris: Masson, 1918, 1 vol. 192 p. ISBN 978-0666336200
- Albert Policard. Précis d'histologie physiologique. Testut Collection. Paris, Doin, 1950. (5th ed.) In-8°, 858 p., first edition in 1922. ISSN 1760-8104 This work is nicknamed "The Policard" by generations of French medical students.
- Albert Policard. Le Poumon, structures et mécanismes à l'état normal et pathologique. Paris, Masson, 1955 (2nd ed.). In-8°, 264 p.
- Pierre Galy, Albert Policard. L'Appareil broncho-pulmonaire. Paris: Masson et Cie, 1970. 1 vol. IV-323 p.
- His last book The Cell Surface and Its Microenvironment (Role in Cellular Aggregates) was published by Masson in 1972, just a few weeks before his death at the age of 91.
