= Jean Brossel =

French physicist (1918–2003)

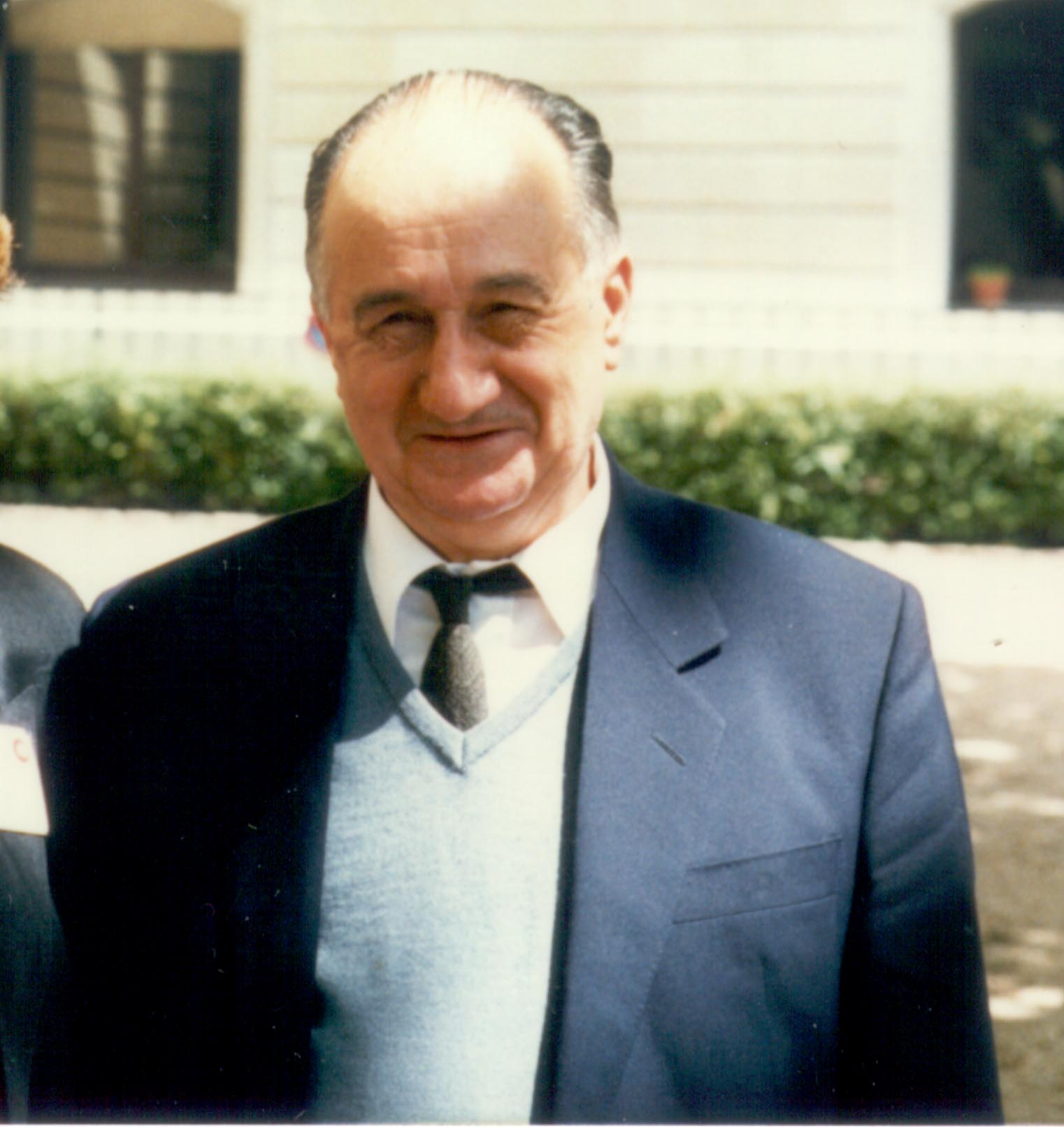
Jean Brossel

Jean Brossel (15 August 1918 – 4 February 2003) was a French physicist known for his work on quantum optics. He was born and died in Périgueux.

Brossel passed the entrance exam for l'École normale supérieure (ENS) 1938, but then was for two years a soldier. From 1941 to 1945 he studied at the ENS under Alfred Kastler and then went to the group of Samuel Tolansky in Manchester where he spent the years 1945–1948 before moving in 1948 to Francis Bitter at MIT. In 1951 for work done at MIT, Brossel received his PhD in Paris under Kastler with a thesis on the application of double resonance methods (developed by Kastler and him) to the study of the excited states of Hg. After completing his PhD, Brossel was attaché des recherches and then Maître de Recherches at CNRS. In 1955 he became a professor at the Faculté des Sciences in Paris (and later a professor at the University of Pierre and Marie Curie (Universitie Paris VI)). From 1973 to 1985 he was Director of the Physics Faculty of ENS. In 1985 he retired and went to the University of Paris.

Brossel is known for his work on optical pumping with Alfred Kastler, with whom he founded in 1951 the spectroscopic laboratory at ENS (Laboratoire de Spectroscopie Hertzienne), which now is called the Laboratoire Kastler-Brossel. Brossel was the co-director and then in 1972 after Kastler's resignation the director.

In his hometown of Périgueux a square is named after him.

In 1960 Brossel won the Holweck Prize and in 1977 he was elected a member of l'Académie des sciences, whose Prix Ampère he received in 1974. In 1984 he received the gold medal of CNRS.
