= Diversity panel =

A diversity panel is a collection of genetic material or individual samples taken from a diverse population of a certain species. The idea is to illustrate the genetic and phenotypic diversity of the species.

Diversity panels exist for human populations, mouse and other organisms.

Researchers in the area of genetics often use diversity panels in order to reveal genotypes that are linked to certain traits, such as in QTL mapping with Genome-wide association study. Those study analyze the Gene–environment interaction underneath simple and complex traits.

== Examples ==
- Human Genome Diversity Project
- The Hybrid Mouse Diversity Panel
- Maize NAM population (Nested association mapping)
- Arabidopsis thaliana 1001 Genome project

== See also ==
- Genetics
- Biodiversity
- Evolution
