= Christian Bordé =

French physicist

Christian Jean Raoul Bordé (15 March 1943 - 30 August 2023) was a French physicist. He has been a member of the French Academy of Sciences since December 2008.

== Biography ==
Emeritus research director at the CNRS, he is known for his work in the field of ultra-high resolution laser spectroscopy. He invented and developed saturation spectroscopy, which he used to study many new and fundamental effects in molecular physics. His name is attached to the design of a whole class of atomic interferometers based on the recoil effect, which make it possible to produce optical clocks, measure atomic masses and probe the properties of space-time. In particular, he demonstrated that these interferometers allowed very accurate measurement of the fields of inertia. The proximity of his work to the field of metrology has led it to preside on several occasions, on behalf of the French Academy of Sciences, over the meetings of the General Conference on Weights and Measures, the executive organ of the Metre Convention.

He was one of the founding members of the French Academy of Technologies and Chevalier of the Légion d'honneur.

He was the grandson of engineer and aeronaut Paul-Alphonse-Barthélémy Bordé, inventor of a compass system for airships patented in 1911 and founder of the company of the same name.

== See also ==
- Ramsey interferometry
