= Fondation Jean Dausset-CEPH =

French-based research center

Coordinates: 48.875592°N 2.368539°E

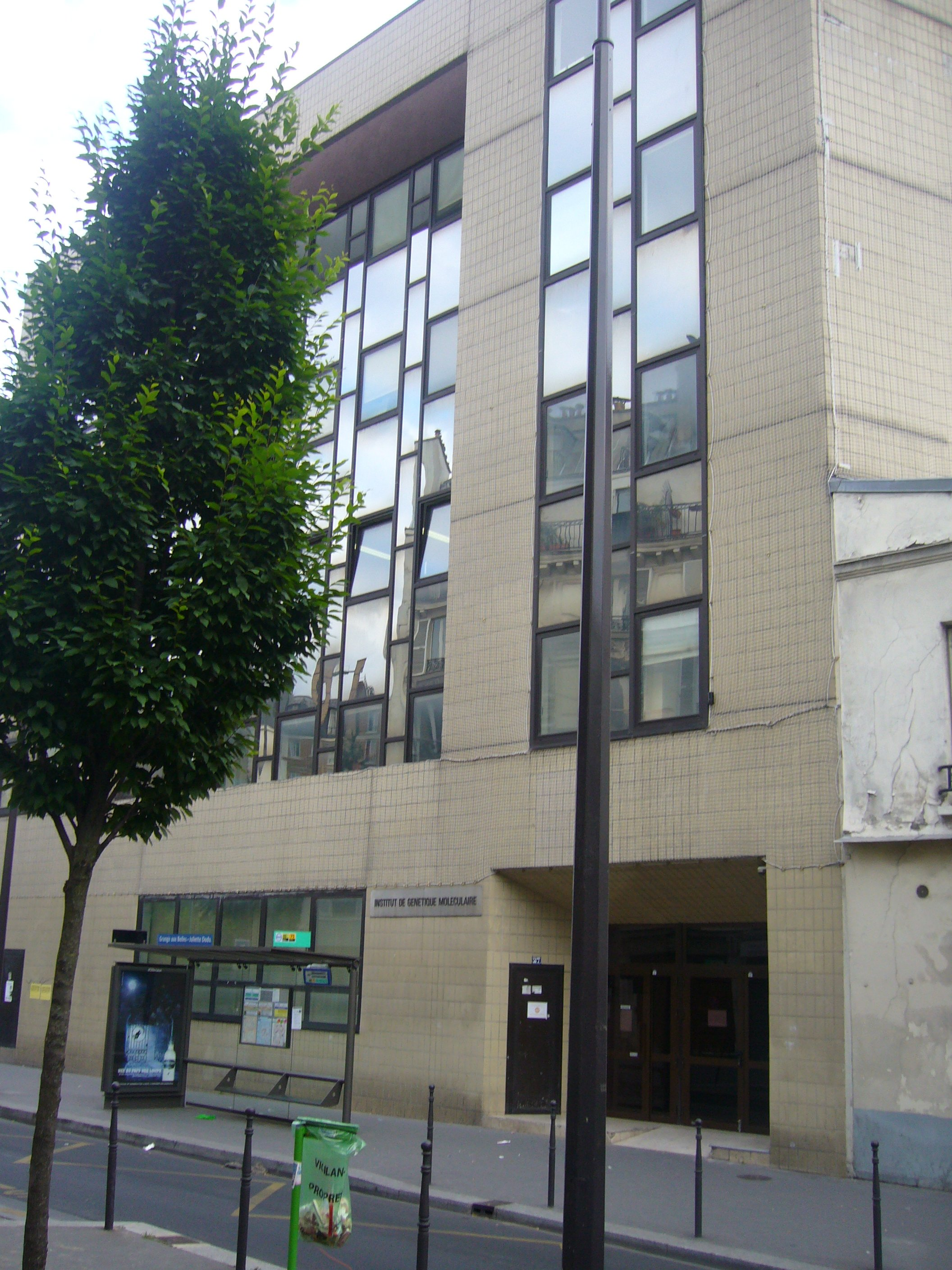
CEPH

The Fondation Jean Dausset-CEPH or CEPH, formerly the Centre d'Etude du Polymorphisme Humain (the Center for the Study of Human Polymorphisms), is an international genetic research center located in Paris, France. It produced a map that includes genetic markers of human chromosomes using a resource of immortalised cell cultures.

== Background ==
In his 2005 addendum to his biography for the 1980 Nobel Prize, Jean Dausset noted that, thanks to his Nobel Prize and a grant from the French Téléthon, he had been able in 1984 to create the Human Polymorphism Study Centre (CEPH), which soon after became Foundation Jean Dausset-CEPH. Dausset founded CEPH with the collaboration of Professors Howard Cann and Daniel Cohen.

The scientific director of CEPH is currently Jean-François Deleuze and its president is François d'Aubert, a French politician, an auditor at the Cour des Comptes and a former minister delegate to research.

== Human genome ==
Numerous collaborators working on the same large families as Dausset had collected for his Nobel Prize-winning studies on the human leukocyte antigen system, led to the addition of numerous gene markers and made it feasible to publish the first genetic map and, later on, the first physical map of the human genome.

== New resources ==
An exhaustive study of human populations around the world has also produced important publications from CEPH. Besides this, DNA samples from sibships of people over 95 years old and a bank of centenarians now provide a valuable research resource at the Foundation Jean Dausset-CEPH.
