= Timeline of computational physics =

The following timeline starts with the invention of the modern computer in the late interwar period.

== 1930s ==
- John Vincent Atanasoff and Clifford Berry create the first electronic non-programmable, digital computing device, the Atanasoff–Berry Computer, that lasted from 1937 to 1942.

== 1940s ==
- Nuclear bomb and ballistics simulations at Los Alamos National Laboratory and Ballistic Research Laboratory (BRL), respectively. (Note: Ballistic Research Laboratory, Aberdeen Proving Grounds, Maryland.)
- Monte Carlo simulation (voted one of the top 10 algorithms of the 20th century by Jack Dongarra and Francis Sullivan in the 2000 issue of Computing in Science and Engineering) is invented at Los Alamos National Laboratory by John von Neumann, Stanislaw Ulam and Nicholas Metropolis.
- First hydrodynamic simulations performed at Los Alamos National Laboratory.
- Ulam and von Neumann introduce the notion of cellular automata.

== 1950s ==
- Equations of State Calculations by Fast Computing Machines introduces the Metropolis–Hastings algorithm. Also, important earlier independent work by Berni Alder and Stan Frankel. (Note: Unfortunately, Alder's thesis advisor was unimpressed, so Alder and Frankel delayed publication of their results until much later.)
- Enrico Fermi, Ulam and John Pasta with help from Mary Tsingou, discover the Fermi–Pasta–Ulam-Tsingou problem.
- Research initiated into percolation theory.
- Molecular dynamics is formulated by Alder and Tom E. Wainwright.

== 1960s ==
- Using computational investigations of the 3-body problem, Michael Minovitch formulates the gravity assist method.
- Glauber dynamics is invented for the Ising model by Roy J. Glauber.
- Edward Lorenz discovers the butterfly effect on a computer, attracting interest in chaos theory.
- Molecular dynamics is independently invented by Aneesur Rahman.
- Walter Kohn instigates the development of density functional theory (with L.J. Sham and Pierre Hohenberg), for which he shared the Nobel Chemistry Prize (1998).
- Martin Kruskal and Norman Zabusky follow up the Fermi–Pasta–Ulam problem with further numerical experiments, and coin the term "soliton".
- Kawasaki dynamics is invented for the Ising model.
- Loup Verlet (re)discovers a numerical integration algorithm, (first used in 1791 by Jean Baptiste Delambre, by P. H. Cowell and A. C. C. Crommelin in 1909, and by Carl Fredrik Störmer in 1907, hence the alternative names Störmer's method or the Verlet-Störmer method) for dynamics, and the Verlet list.

== 1970s ==
- Computer algebra replicates the work of Boris Delaunay in Lunar theory.
- Martinus Veltman's calculations at CERN lead him and Gerard 't Hooft to valuable insights into renormalizability of electroweak theory. The computation has been cited as a key reason for the award of the Nobel Physics Prize that has been given to both.
- Jean Hardy, Yves Pomeau and Olivier de Pazzis introduce the first lattice gas model, abbreviated as the HPP model after its authors. These later evolved into lattice Boltzmann models.
- Kenneth G. Wilson shows that continuum quantum chromodynamics (QCD) is recovered for an infinitely large lattice with its sites infinitesimally close to one another, thereby beginning lattice QCD.

== 1980s ==
- Italian physicists Roberto Car and Michele Parrinello invent the Car–Parrinello method.
- Swendsen–Wang algorithm is invented in the field of Monte Carlo simulations.
- Fast multipole method is invented by Vladimir Rokhlin and Leslie Greengard (voted one of the top 10 algorithms of the 20th century).
- Ullli Wolff invents the Wolff algorithm for statistical physics and Monte Carlo simulation.

== See also ==
- Timeline of scientific computing
- Computational physics
- Important publications in computational physics
