= Pomeau =

Pomeau is a French surname. Notable people of the name include:

- René Pomeau (1917–2000), French philologist
- Yves Pomeau (born 1942), French mathematician and physicist

== See also ==
- Pommeau
