= Uriel Frisch =

French mathematical physicist

- Born: December 10, 1940 (age 85); Agen, France
- Occupation: Mathematical physicist
- Title: Director of Research Emeritus
- Board member of: French Academy of Sciences (2008); Ordre national du Mérite
- Spouse: Hélène Frisch
- Relatives: Paul Lévy
- Awards: Peccot Prize of the Collège de France (1967); Bazin Prize of the French Academy of Sciences (1987); Lewis Fry Richardson Medal (2003); Modesto Panetti e Carlo Ferrari Prize (2010)

Academic background
- Education: French National Centre for Scientific Research
- Thesis: La propagation des ondes en milieu aléatoire et les équations stochastiques (Wave propagation in a random medium and stochastic equations) (1966)
- Doctoral advisor: Robert Kraichnan

Academic work
- Discipline: Physicist
- Sub-discipline: Fluid dynamics
- Institutions: French National Centre for Scientific Research
- Notable students: Marcel Lesieur (1973); Claude Basdevant (1981); Zhen-Su She (1987); Silvio Gama (1993)
- Notable works: Turbulence: The Legacy of A. N. Kolmogorov

Notes
- List of notable students from the Mathematics Genealogy Project.

Uriel Frisch (born December 10, 1940 in Agen, France) is a French mathematical physicist known for his work on fluid dynamics and turbulence.

== Biography ==
From 1959 to 1963 Frisch was a student at the École Normale Supérieure. Early in his graduate studies, he became interested in turbulence, under the mentorship of Robert Kraichnan, a former assistant to Albert Einstein. Frisch earned a Ph.D. in 1967 from the University of Paris, and since then he has worked at the French National Centre for Scientific Research (CNRS). He retired in 2006, and became a director of research emeritus at CNRS.

Frisch's wife, Hélène, is also a physicist and the grand daughter of mathematician Paul Lévy.

== Research ==
Frisch is the author of a 1995 book on turbulence and of over 200 research publications.

One of his most cited works, published in 1986, concerns the lattice gas automaton method of simulating fluid dynamics using a cellular automaton. The method used until that time, the HPP model, simulated particles moving in axis-parallel directions in a square lattice, but this model was unsatisfactory because it obeyed unwanted and unphysical conservation laws (the conservation of momentum within each axis-parallel line). Frisch and his co-authors Brosl Hasslacher and Yves Pomeau introduced a model using instead the hexagonal lattice which became known as the FHP model after the initials of its inventors and which much more accurately simulated the behavior of actual fluids.

Frisch is also known for his work with Giorgio Parisi on the analysis of the fine structure of turbulent flows, for his early advocacy of multifractal systems in modeling physical processes, and for his research on using transportation theory to reconstruct the distribution of matter in the early universe.

== Awards and honors ==
Frisch won the Peccot Prize of the Collège de France for his doctoral thesis in 1967, the Bazin Prize of the French Academy of Sciences in 1985, and the Lewis Fry Richardson Medal of the European Geosciences Union "for his fundamental contributions to the understanding of turbulence" in 2003.

He is a member of the French Academy of Sciences since 2008. He is an Officier of the Ordre national du Mérite and the recipient of the 2010 Modesto Panetti e Carlo Ferrari prize. In 2020 he has been awarded with the prize EUROMECH, provided by the European Mechanics Society.

== Selected publications ==
- Frisch, U.; Hasslacher, B.; Pomeau, Y. (1986), "Lattice-gas automata for the Navier-Stokes equation", Phys. Rev. Lett., 56 (14): 1505–1508, Bibcode:1986PhRvL..56.1505F, doi:10.1103/PhysRevLett.56.1505, PMID 10032689
- Frisch, Uriel (1995). Turbulence. The legacy of A. N. Kolmogorov. Cambridge: Cambridge University Press. ISBN 0-521-45103-5. MR 1428905.
- Frisch, U.; Matarrese, S.; Mohayaee, R; Sobolevski, A. (2002). "A reconstruction of the initial conditions of the universe by optimal mass transportation". Nature. 417 (6886): 260–262. arXiv:astro-ph/0109483. Bibcode:2002Natur.417..260F. doi:10.1038/417260a. PMID 12015595. S2CID 4379455.
