= Hénon map =

Discrete-time dynamical system

Hénon attractor for a = 1.4 and b = 0.3

Hénon attractor for a = 1.4 and b = 0.3

In mathematics, the Hénon map is a discrete-time dynamical system. It is one of the most studied examples of dynamical systems that exhibit chaotic behavior. The Hénon map takes a point (x_{n}, y_{n}) in the plane and maps it to a new point:
$$\begin{cases}x_{n+1} = 1 - a x_n^2 + y_n\\y_{n+1} = b x_n\end{cases}$$
The map depends on two parameters, a and b, which for the classical Hénon map have values of a = 1.4 and b = 0.3. For the classical values, the Hénon map is chaotic. For other values of a and b, the map may be chaotic, intermittent, or converge to a periodic orbit. An overview of the map's behavior at different parameter values can be seen in its orbit diagram.

The map was introduced by Michel Hénon as a simplified model for the Poincaré section of the Lorenz system. For the classical map, an initial point in the plane will either approach a set of points known as the Hénon strange attractor, or it will diverge to infinity. The Hénon attractor is a fractal, smooth in one direction and a Cantor set in another. Numerical estimates for the fractal dimension of the strange attractor for the classical map yield a correlation dimension of 1.21 ± 0.01 and a box-counting dimension of 1.261 ± 0.003.

== Dynamics ==
=== The Attractor ===
The Hénon map is a two-dimensional diffeomorphism with a constant Jacobian determinant. The Jacobian matrix of the map is:
$$J = \begin{bmatrix} -2ax & 1 \\ b & 0 \end{bmatrix}$$
The determinant of this matrix is $det(J) = -b$. Because the map is dissipative (i.e., volumes shrink under iteration), the determinant must be between -1 and 1. The Hénon map is dissipative for |b| < 1. For the classical parameters $a = 1.4, b = 0.3$, the determinant is -0.3, so the map contracts areas at a constant rate. Every iteration shrinks areas by a factor of 0.3.

This contraction, combined with a stretching and folding action, creates the characteristic fractal structure of the Hénon attractor. For the classical parameters, most initial conditions lead to trajectories that outline this boomerang-like shape. The attractor contains an infinite number of unstable periodic orbits, which are fundamental to its structure.

=== Fixed points ===
The map has two fixed points, which remain unchanged by the mapping. These are found by solving x = 1 - ax^{2} + y and y = bx. Substituting the second equation into the first gives the quadratic equation:
$$ax^2 + (1-b)x - 1 = 0$$
The solutions (the x-coordinates of the fixed points) are:
$$x = \frac{-(1-b) \pm \sqrt{(1-b)^2 + 4a}}{2a}$$
For the classical parameters a = 1.4 and b = 0.3, the two fixed points are:

$x_1 \approx 0.631, \quad y_1 \approx 0.189$

$x_2 \approx -1.131, \quad y_2 \approx -0.339$

The stability of these points is determined by the eigenvalues of the Jacobian matrix J evaluated at the fixed points. For the classical map, the first fixed point is a saddle point (unstable), while the second fixed point is a repeller (also unstable). The unstable manifold of the first fixed point is a key component that generates the strange attractor itself.

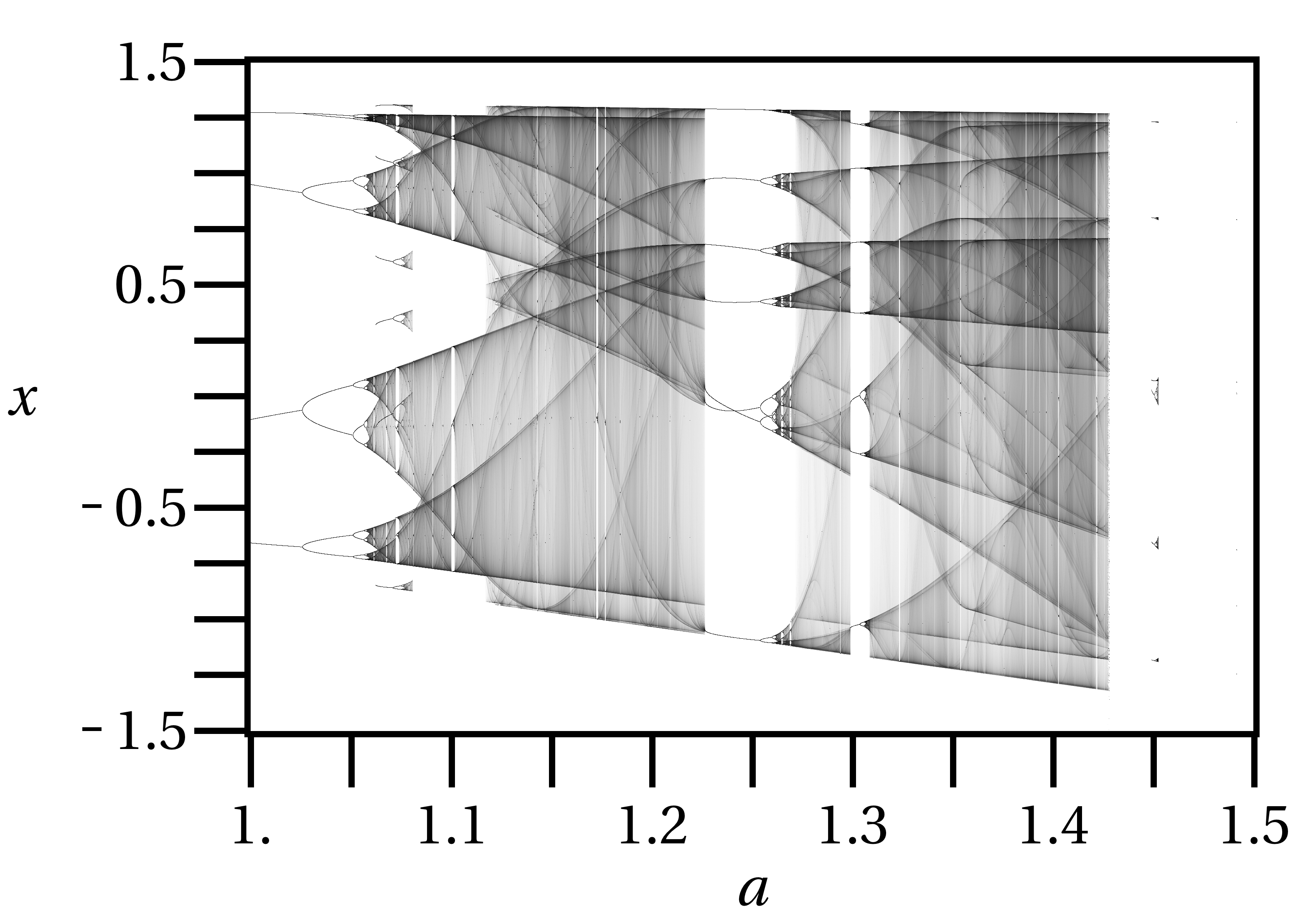
Orbit diagram for the Hénon map, keeping b = 0.3 and varying a. The plot shows the classic period-doubling route to chaos.

=== Bifurcation diagram ===
The Hénon map exhibits complex behavior as its parameters are varied. A common way to visualize this is with a bifurcation diagram. If b is held constant (e.g., at 0.3) and a is varied, the map transitions from regular (periodic) to chaotic behavior. This transition occurs through a period-doubling cascade, similar to that of the logistic map.

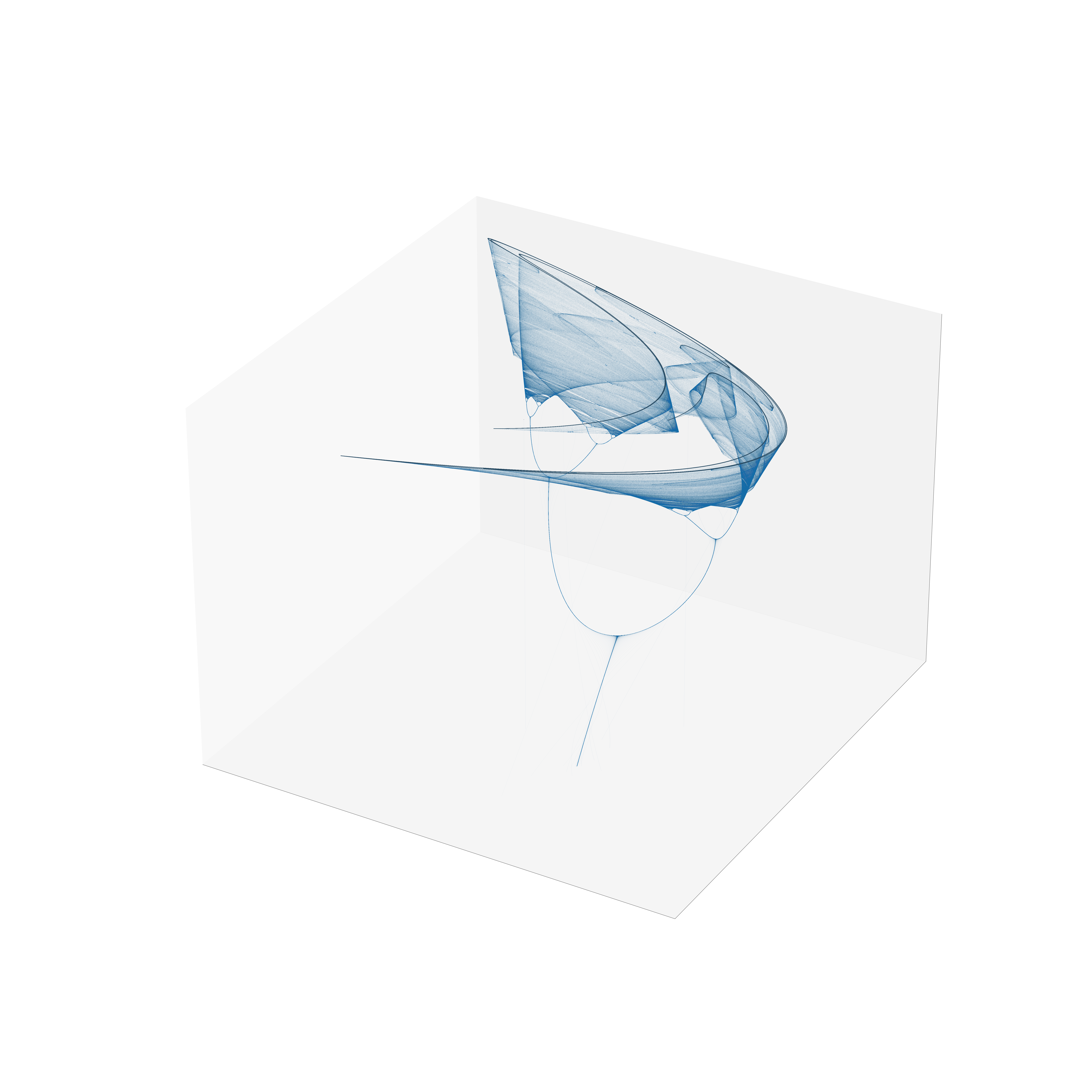
A 3D view of the bifurcation diagram, varying parameter b along the new axis. This reveals the "boomerang" shape of the parameter space region where the attractor exists.

For small values of a, the system converges to a single stable fixed point. As a increases, this point becomes unstable and splits into a stable 2-cycle. This cycle then becomes unstable and splits into a 4-cycle, then an 8-cycle, and so on, until a critical value of a is reached where the system becomes fully chaotic. Within the chaotic region, there are also "windows" of periodicity where stable orbits reappear for certain ranges of a.

=== Koopman operator analysis ===
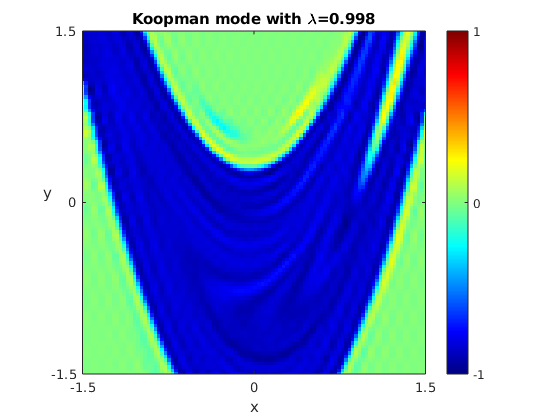
An approximate Koopman mode of the Hénon map. The level sets of this mode reveal the complex geometry of the dynamics. The dark blue region outlines the basin of attraction for the strange attractor, while the intricate structures within correspond to the attractor's stable manifold.

An alternative way to analyze dynamical systems like the Hénon map is through the Koopman operator method. This approach offers a linear perspective on nonlinear dynamics. Instead of studying the evolution of individual points in phase space, one considers the action of the system on a space of "observable" functions, g(x, y). The Koopman operator, U, is a linear operator that maps an observable g to its value at the next time step:
$$(Ug)(\mathbf{x}_n) = g(\mathbf{x}_{n+1}) = g(1-ax_n^2+y_n, bx_n)$$
While the operator U is linear, it acts on an infinite-dimensional function space. The key to the analysis is to find the eigenfunctions φ_{k} and eigenvalues λ_{k} of this operator, which satisfy Uφ_{k} = λ_{k}φ_{k}. These eigenfunctions, also known as Koopman modes, and their corresponding eigenvalues contain significant information about the system's dynamics.

For chaotic systems like the Hénon map, the eigenfunctions are typically complex, fractal-like functions. They cannot be found analytically and must be computed numerically, often using methods like Dynamic Mode Decomposition (DMD). The level sets of the Koopman modes can reveal the invariant structures of the system, such as the stable and unstable manifolds and the basin of attraction, providing a global picture of the dynamics.

== Decomposition ==
The classical Hénon map after 15 iterations, showing the stretching and folding action described by the decomposition.

The Hénon map can be decomposed into a sequence of three simpler geometric transformations. This helps to understand how the map stretches, squeezes, and folds phase space. The map T(x, y) = (1 - ax^{2} + y, bx) can be seen as the composition T = R ∘ C ∘ B of three functions:

1. Bending: An area-preserving nonlinear bend in the y direction:
  $$(x_1, y_1) = (x, 1 - ax^2 + y)$$
2. Contraction: A contraction in the x direction:
  $$(x_2, y_2) = (bx_1, y_1)$$
3. Reflection: A reflection across the line y = x:
  $$(x_3, y_3) = (y_2, x_2)$$

The final point is (x_{n+1}, y_{n+1}) = (x_{3}, y_{3}). This decomposition separates the area-preserving folding action (step 1) from the dissipative contraction (step 2).

== History ==
In 1976, the physicist Yves Pomeau and his collaborator Jean-Luc Ibanez undertook a numerical study of the Lorenz system. By analyzing the system using Poincaré sections, they observed the characteristic stretching and folding of the attractor, which was a hallmark of the work on strange attractors by David Ruelle. Their physical, experimental approach to the Lorenz system led to two key insights. First, they identified a transition where the system switches from a strange attractor to a limit cycle at a critical parameter value. This phenomenon would later be explained by Pomeau and Paul Manneville as the "scenario" of intermittency.

Second, Pomeau and Ibanez suggested that the complex dynamics of the three-dimensional, continuous Lorenz system could be understood by studying a much simpler, two-dimensional discrete map that possessed similar characteristics. In January 1976, Pomeau presented this idea at a seminar at the Côte d'Azur Observatory. Michel Hénon, an astronomer at the observatory, was in attendance. Intrigued by the suggestion, Hénon began a systematic search for the simplest possible map that would exhibit a strange attractor. He arrived at the now-famous quadratic map, publishing his findings in the seminal paper, "A two-dimensional mapping with a strange attractor."

== Generalizations ==
=== 3D Hénon map ===
A 3-D generalization for the Hénon map was proposed by Hitzl and Zele:

$$\mathbf{s}(n+1)=
\begin{bmatrix}
s_1(n+1) \\
s_2(n+1) \\
s_3(n+1)
\end{bmatrix}
=
\begin{bmatrix}
1 - \alpha s_1^2(n) + s_3(n) \\
-\beta s_1(n) \\
\beta s_1(n) + s_2(n)
\end{bmatrix}$$

For certain parameters (e.g., $\alpha=1.07$ and $\beta=0.3$), this map generates a chaotic attractor.

=== Four-dimensional extension ===
Hénon map in 4D. The range for b is -1.5 to 0.5 and for a it is -2.3 to 1.0. The video shows 3D cross-sections where the points do not diverge to infinity.

The Hénon map can be plotted in four-dimensional space by treating its parameters, a and b, as additional axes. This allows for a visualization of the map's behavior across the entire parameter space. One way to visualize this 4D structure is to render a series of 3D slices, where each slice represents a fixed value of one parameter (e.g., a) while the other three (x, y, b) are displayed. The fourth parameter is then varied as a time variable, creating a video of the evolving 3D structure.

=== Filtered Hénon map ===
Other generalizations involve introducing feedback loops with digital filters to create complex, band-limited chaotic signals.

== See also ==
- Horseshoe map
- Takens' theorem
- Logistic map
- Complex quadratic polynomial
