= Pomeau–Manneville scenario =

In the theory of dynamical systems (or turbulent flow), the Pomeau–Manneville scenario is the transition to chaos (turbulence) due to intermittency. Named after Yves Pomeau and Paul Manneville. The aforementioned scenario is realized using the Pomeau–Manneville map. The Pomeau–Manneville map is a polynomial mapping (equivalently, recurrence relation), often referred to as an archetypal example of how complex, chaotic behaviour can arise from very simple nonlinear dynamical equations. Unlike other maps, the Pomeau–Manneville map exhibits intermittency, characterized by periods of low and high amplitude fluctuations. Recent research suggests that this bursting behavior might lead to anomalous diffusion.
