= Lattice Boltzmann methods for solids =

Class of computational solid dynamics methods

The Lattice Boltzmann methods for solids (LBMS) are a set of methods for solving partial differential equations (PDE) in solid mechanics. The methods use a discretization of the Boltzmann equation(BM), and their use is known as the lattice Boltzmann methods for solids.

LBMS methods are categorized by their reliance on:

- Vectorial distributions
- Wave solvers
- Force tuning

The LBMS subset remains highly challenging from a computational aspect as much as from a theoretical point of view. Solving solid equations within the LBM framework is still a very active area of research. If solids are solved, this shows that the Boltzmann equation is capable of describing solid motions as well as fluids and gases: thus unlocking complex physics to be solved such as fluid-structure interaction (FSI) in biomechanics.

== Proposed insights ==
=== Vectorial distributions ===
The first attempt of LBMS tried to use a Boltzmann-like equation for force (vectorial) distributions. The approach requires more computational memory but results are obtained in fracture and solid cracking.

=== Wave solvers ===
Another approach consists in using LBM as acoustic solvers to capture waves propagation in solids.

=== Force tuning ===
==== Introduction ====
This idea consists of introducing a modified version of the forcing term: (or equilibrium distribution) into the LBM as a stress divergence force. This force is considered space-time dependent and contains solid properties (Note: Matter properties such as Young's modulus and Poisson's ratio.)

$$\vec{g} = \frac{1}{\rho} \vec{\mathbf{\nabla}_{x}} \cdot \overline{\overline{\sigma}}$$,

where $\overline{\overline{\sigma}}$ denotes the Cauchy stress tensor. $\vec{g}$ and $\rho$ are respectively the gravity vector and solid matter density. The stress tensor is usually computed across the lattice aiming finite difference schemes.

==== Some results ====
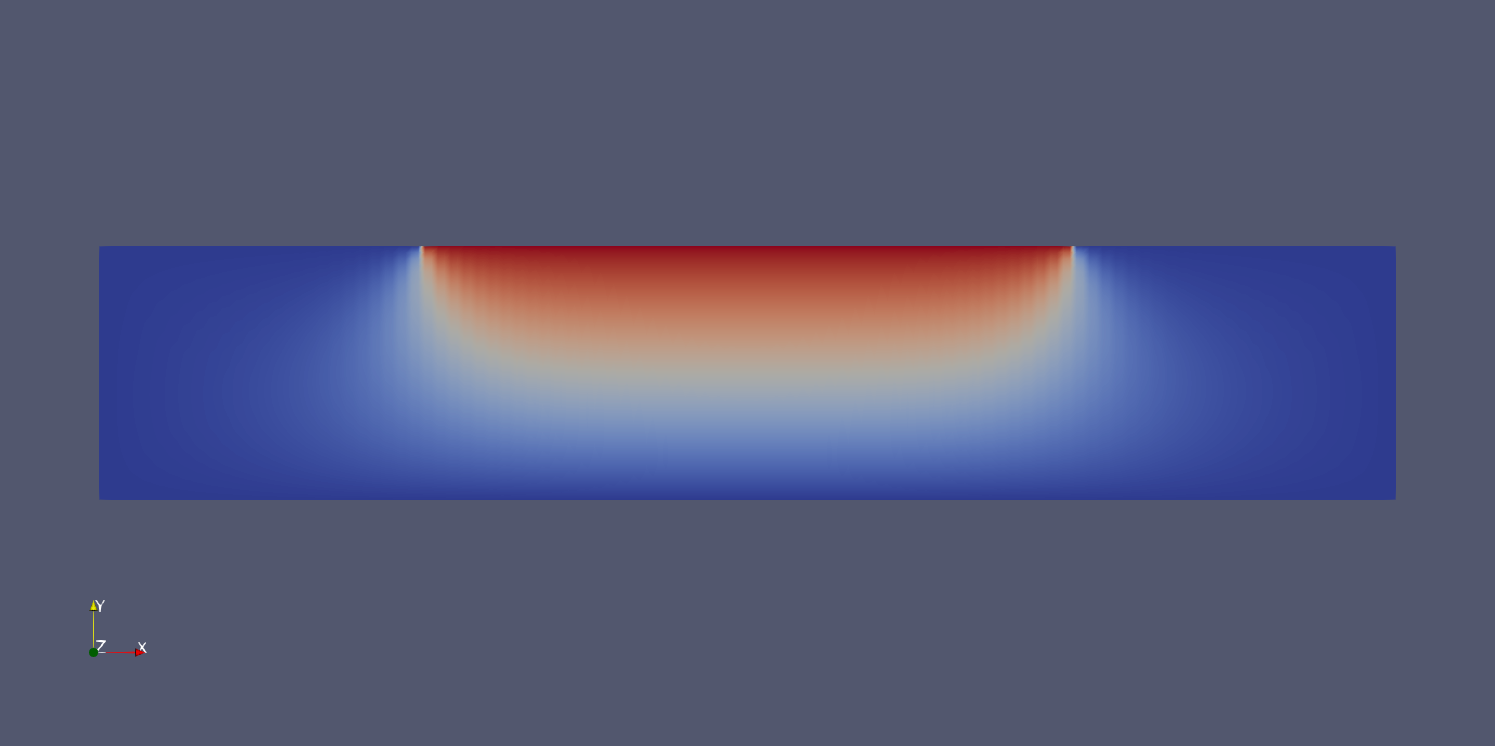
2D displacement magnitude on a solid system using force tuning. Obtained field is in accordance with finite element methods results.

Force tuning has recently proven its efficiency with a maximum error of 5% in comparison with standard finite element solvers in mechanics. Accurate validation of results can also be a tedious task since these methods are very different, common issues are:

- Meshes or lattice discretization
- Location of computed fields at elements or nodes
- Hidden information in software used for finite element analysis comparison
- Non-linear materials
- Steady state convergence for LBMS

== See also ==
- Finite element method
- Lattice Boltzmann methods
- Meshfree methods
