= Michel Hénon =

French mathematician and astronomer (1931–2013)

- Born: Michel Hénon; 23 July 1931; Paris
- Died: 7 April 2013 (aged 81); Nice
- Known for: Hénon map Hénon–Heiles system Broucke–Henon–Hadjidemetriou periodic orbits
- Awards: Brouwer Award (1983); Prix Jean Ricard (1978)
- Scientific career
- Workplaces: CNRS; University of Arizona

Michel Hénon (French: [enɔ̃]; 23 July 1931, Paris – 7 April 2013, Nice) was a French mathematician and astronomer. He worked for a long time at the Nice Observatory.

In astronomy, Hénon is well known for his contributions to stellar dynamics. In the late 1960s and early 1970s he made important contributions on the dynamical evolution of star clusters, in particular globular clusters. He developed a numerical technique using Monte Carlo methods to follow the dynamical evolution of a spherical star cluster much faster than the so-called n-body methods.

In mathematics, he is well known for the Hénon map, a simple discrete dynamical system that exhibits chaotic behavior. He published a two-volume work on the restricted three-body problem.

In 1978 he was awarded the Prix Jean Ricard.

The European Space Agency's HENON spacecraft is named after him and will use a type of orbit he developed.

== See also ==
- N-body units
