= Brosl Hasslacher =

American theoretical physicist (1941–2005)

Brosl Hasslacher (May 13, 1941 – November 11, 2005) was an American theoretical physicist.

Brosl Hasslacher was born in New York City in 1941 and obtained a bachelor's in physics from Harvard University in 1962. He did his Ph.D. with D.Z. Freeman and C.N. Yang at the State University of New York at Stony Brook. After having several postdoctoral and research positions at Institute for Advanced Study in Princeton, New Jersey, Caltech, ENS in Paris, and CERN, he settled for more than twenty years at the Theoretical Division of the Los Alamos National Laboratory. There he was involved in theoretical, experimental, and numerical work in theoretical physics, high-energy physics, nonlinear dynamics, fluid dynamics, nanotechnology, and robotics.

In the 1970s, he worked on the extended hadron model, collaborating with A. Neveu.

During the 1980s, Hasslacher pioneered with Uriel Frisch and Yves Pomeau the lattice-gas method for discrete simulation of fluid flow.

As part of the Los Alamos National Laboratory's Center for Nonlinear Studies, Hasslacher worked with Mitchell Feigenbaum and contributed ideas to chaos theory.

In the 1990s, Hasslacher worked with Mark Tilden on several papers concerning Biomorphic engineering. He is largely credited for using nonlinear dynamics to describe and design Tilden's BEAM robotics.

In 1994, Hasslacher's UNIX account (bhass) at Los Alamos National Laboratory was used by hacker Kevin Mitnick to break into computer security expert Tsutomu Shimomura's computers.

He retired from Los Alamos National Laboratory in 2003.

== Notable papers ==
- B. Hasslacher, A. Neveu, "Dynamic charges in field theories", Nuclear Physics (1979).
- B. Hasslacher, M.J. Perry, "Spin networks are simplicial quantum gravity", Physics Letters (1981).
- Frisch, U., B. Hasslacher, and Y. Pomeau, "Lattice gas Automata for the Navier Stokes Equation"' Phys. Rev. Lett. (1986).
- B. Hasslacher, "Spontaneous curvature in a class of lattice field theories" Physica D(1991).
- B. Hasslacher, M.W. Tilden, "Living machines", Robotics and Autonomous Systems (1995).
- B. Hasslacher, DA Meyer, "Modeling dynamical geometry with lattice gas automata", (1998).
- Dashen, RF; Hasslacher, B; Neveu, "A Particle spectrum in model field theories from semiclassical functional integral techniques" Physical Review D (Particles and Fields); (1975)
- Frisch, U.; d'Humieres, D.; Hasslacher, B.; Lallemand, P.; Pomeau, Y.; Rivet, JP "Lattice gas hydrodynamics in two and three dimensions. " Complex Systems; (1987)
- Dashen, RF; Hasslacher, B; Neveu, A "Semiclassical bound states in an asymptotically free theory" Physical Review D (Particles and Fields); 1975;
- Christ, N.; Hasslacher, B.; Mueller, AH Light-cone behavior of perturbation theory. Physical Review D (Particles and Fields); 15 Dec. 1972; vol.6, no.12, p. 3543-62
- Corrigan, E; Hasslacher, B "Functional-Equation for Exponential Loop Integrals In Gauge Theories" Physics Letters B; 1979; v.81, no.2, p. 181-184
- Feigenbaum, MJ; Hasslacher, B, "Irrational decimations and path integrals for external noise" Physical Review Letters; 30 Aug. 1982; vol.49, no.9, p. 605-9
- Hasslacher, B; Mottola, E Gauge "Field Model of Induced Classical Gravity" Physics Letters B; 1980; v.95, no.2, p. 237-240
- Hasslacher, B; Mottola, E, "Asymptotically Free Quantum-Gravity and Black-Holes" Physics Letters B; 1981; v.99, no.3, p. 221-224
- Hasslacher, B; Perry, MJ, "Spin Networks are Simplicial Quantum-Gravity" Physics Letters B; 1981; v.103, no.1, p. 21-24
- Hasslacher, B.; Kapral, R.; Lawniczak, A., "Molecular Turing structures in the biochemistry of the cell" Chaos; 1993; vol.3, no.1, p. 7-13
- Hasslacher, B.; Sinclair, DK; Cicuta, GM; Sugar, RL "Tower exchange in lambda phi {sup 3} theory" Physical Review Letters; (1970)
- Hasslacher, B.; Sinclair, DK "Feynman-parameter approach to N-tower exchange in phi {sup 3} theory" Physical Review D (Particles and Fields); 15 April 1971; vol.3, no.8, p. 1770–81
- Hasslacher, B.; Hsue, CS; Sinclair, DK "Dual-resonance model implications for two-particle spectra in inclusive reactions" Physical Review D (Particles and Fields); (1971)
- Hasslacher, B; Sinclair, DK, "Problems with currents in the dual-resonance model" Lettere al Nuovo Cimento; 12 Sept. 1970; vol.4, no.11, p. 515-19
- Imholt, TJ; Dyke, CA; Hasslacher, B; Perez, JM; Price, DW; Roberts, JA; Scott, JB; Wadhawan, A; Ye, Z; Tour, JM Nanotubes in Microwave Fields: Light Emission, Intense Heat, Outgassing, and Reconstruction Chemistry of Materials; 21 Oct. 2003; vol.15, no.21, p. 3969-70
- Hasslacher, B; Meyer, DA Modeling dynamical geometry with lattice-gas automata. International Journal of Modern Physics C; Dec. 1998; vol.9, no.8, p. 1597-605 Conference: 7th International Conference on the Discrete Simulation of Fluids, 14–18 July 1998, Oxford, UK
- Hasslacher, B; Meyer, DA Lattice gases and exactly solvable models. Journal of Statistical Physics; Aug. 1992; vol.68, no.3-4, p. 575-90
- Hasslacher, B PARALLEL BILLIARDS AND MONSTER SYSTEMS DAEDALUS; WIN 1992; v.121, no.1, p. 53-65
- HASSLACHER, B; MEYER, DA Knot invariants and cellular automata. Physica D; 2 Sept. 1990; vol.45, no.1-3, p. 328-44
- Hasslacher, B.; Mottola, E. Asymptotically free quantum gravity and black holes. Physics Letters B; 19 Feb. 1981; vol.99B, no.3, p. 221-4
- Hasslacher, B.; Mottola, E. Gauge field model of induced classical gravity. Physics Letters B; 22 Sept. 1980; vol.95B, no.2, p. 237-40
- Dashen, RF; Hasslacher, B.; Neveu, A. Nonperturbative methods and extended-hadron models in field theory. I. Semiclassical functional methods. Physical Review D (Particles and Fields); 15 Dec. 1974; vol.10, no.12, p. 4114-29
- Dashen, RF; Hasslacher, B.; Neveu, A. Nonperturbative methods and extended-hadron models in field theory. II. Two-dimensional models and extended hadrons. Physical Review D (Particles and Fields); 15 Dec. 1974; vol.10, no.12, p. 4130-8
- Dashen, RF; Hasslacher, B.; Neveu, A., Nonperturbative methods and extended-hadron models in field theory. III. Four-dimensional non-Abelian models. Physical Review D (Particles and Fields); 15 Dec. 1974; vol.10, no.12, p. 4138-42

== See also ==
- Lattice gas automaton
- Spin network
