= N-body units =

System of units used for N-body simulations

Quantity	Expression
Unit of length (R)	$\frac{1}{R} = \frac{1}{M^2} \sum_{i,j \ne i}^{N} \frac{m_i m_j}{\left| \vec{r_j}-\vec{r_i} \right| }$
Unit of mass (M)	$M = \sum_{i=1}^{N} m_i$

N-body units are a completely self-contained system of units used for N-body simulations of self-gravitating systems in astrophysics. In this system, the base physical units are chosen so that the total mass, M, the gravitational constant, G, and the virial radius, R, are normalized. The underlying assumption is that the system of N objects (stars) satisfies the virial theorem. The consequence of standard N-body units is that the velocity dispersion of the system, v, is $\scriptstyle \frac{1}{2}\sqrt{2}$ and that the dynamical or crossing time, t, is $\scriptstyle 2\sqrt{2}$. The use of standard N-body units was advocated by Michel Hénon in 1971. Early adopters of this system of units included H. Cohn in 1979 and D. Heggie and R. Mathieu in 1986. At the conference MODEST14 in 2014, D. Heggie proposed that the community abandon the name "N-body units" and replace it with the name "Hénon units" to commemorate the originator.
