= Intermittency =

Irregular alternation different types of dynamics

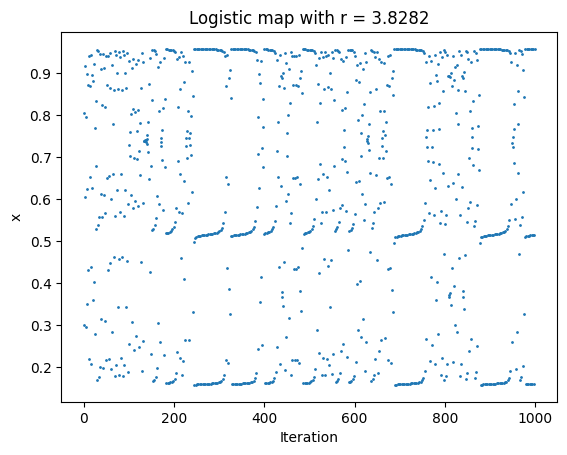
Intermittency in logistic map with $r = 3.8282$. The trajectory alternates between almost period-3 trajectories and chaotic trajectories. At $r = 1 + \sqrt 8 \approx 3.8284$ a stable period-3 trajectory emerges.

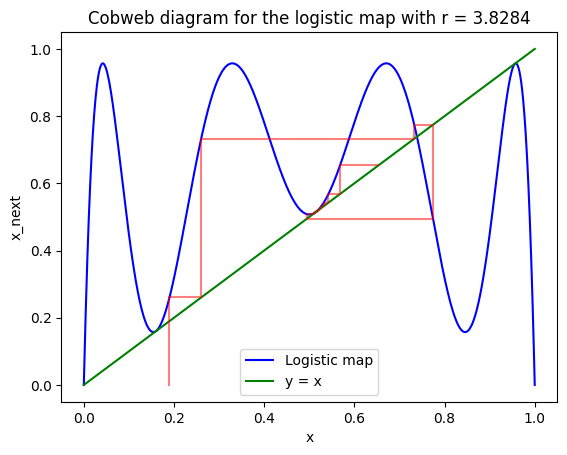
The intermittency in logistic map can be understood by looking at the cobweb diagram for logistic map (iterated three times). In the cobweb diagram, there are almost-tangencies where the trajectory can be trapped for a long time.

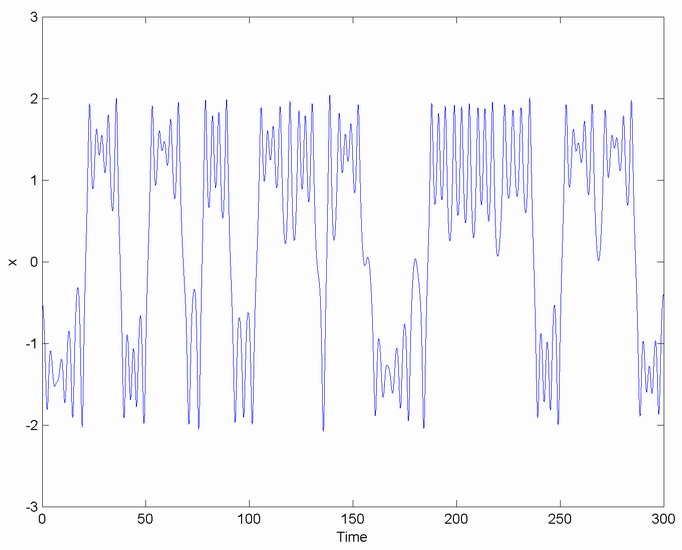
Intermittent jumping between two potential wells in the driven Duffing oscillator. This is an example of crisis-induced intermittency.

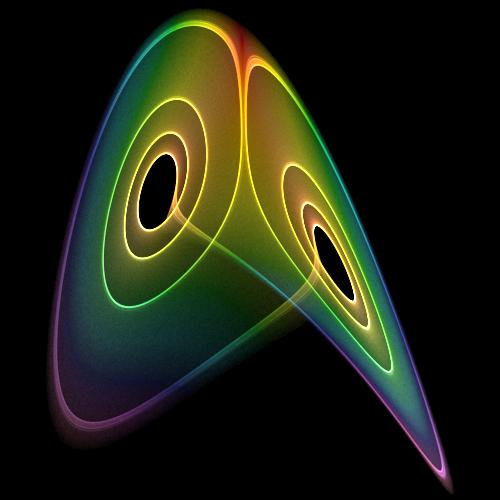
Lorenz attractor showing intermittency. The system spends long periods close to the bright periodic orbit, occasionally moving away for phases of chaotic dynamics that cover the rest of the attractor. This is an example of Pomeau–Manneville dynamics.

In dynamical systems, intermittency is the irregular alternation of phases of apparently periodic and chaotic dynamics (Pomeau–Manneville dynamics), or different forms of chaotic dynamics (crisis-induced intermittency).

Experimentally, intermittency appears as long periods of almost periodic behavior interrupted by chaotic behavior. As control variables change, the chaotic behavior become more frequent until the system is fully chaotic. This progression is known as the intermittency route to chaos.

Pomeau and Manneville described three routes to intermittency where a nearly periodic system shows irregularly spaced bursts of chaos. These (type I, II and III) correspond to the approach to a saddle-node bifurcation, a subcritical Hopf bifurcation, or an inverse period-doubling bifurcation. In the apparently periodic phases the behaviour is only nearly periodic, slowly drifting away from an unstable periodic orbit. Eventually the system gets far enough away from the periodic orbit to be affected by chaotic dynamics in the rest of the state space, until it gets close to the orbit again and returns to the nearly periodic behaviour. Since the time spent near the periodic orbit depends sensitively on how closely the system entered its vicinity (in turn determined by what happened during the chaotic period) the length of each phase is unpredictable.

Another kind, on-off intermittency, occurs when a previously transversally stable chaotic attractor with dimension less than the embedding space begins to lose stability. Near unstable orbits within the attractor orbits can escape into the surrounding space, producing a temporary burst before returning to the attractor.

In crisis-induced intermittency a chaotic attractor suffers a crisis, where two or more attractors cross the boundaries of each other's basin of attraction. As an orbit moves through the first attractor it can cross over the boundary and become attracted to the second attractor, where it will stay until its dynamics moves it across the boundary again.

Intermittent behaviour is commonly observed in fluid flows that are turbulent or near the transition to turbulence. In highly turbulent flows, intermittency is seen in the irregular dissipation of kinetic energy and the anomalous scaling of velocity increments. Understanding and modeling atmospheric flow and turbulence under such conditions are further complicated by “turbulence intermittency,” which manifests as periods of strong turbulent activity interspersed in a more quiescent airflow. It is also seen in the irregular alternation between turbulent and non-turbulent fluid that appear in turbulent jets and other turbulent free shear flows. In pipe flow and other wall bounded shear flows, there are intermittent puffs that are central to the process of transition from laminar to turbulent flow. Intermittent behavior has also been experimentally demonstrated in circuit oscillators and chemical reactions.

== See also ==
- Pomeau–Manneville scenario
- Crisis (dynamical systems)
- Turbulent flow
- Fluorescence intermittency (blinking) of organic molecules and colloidal quantum dots (nanocrystals)
