= Ikeda map =

Chaotic map with a strange attractor

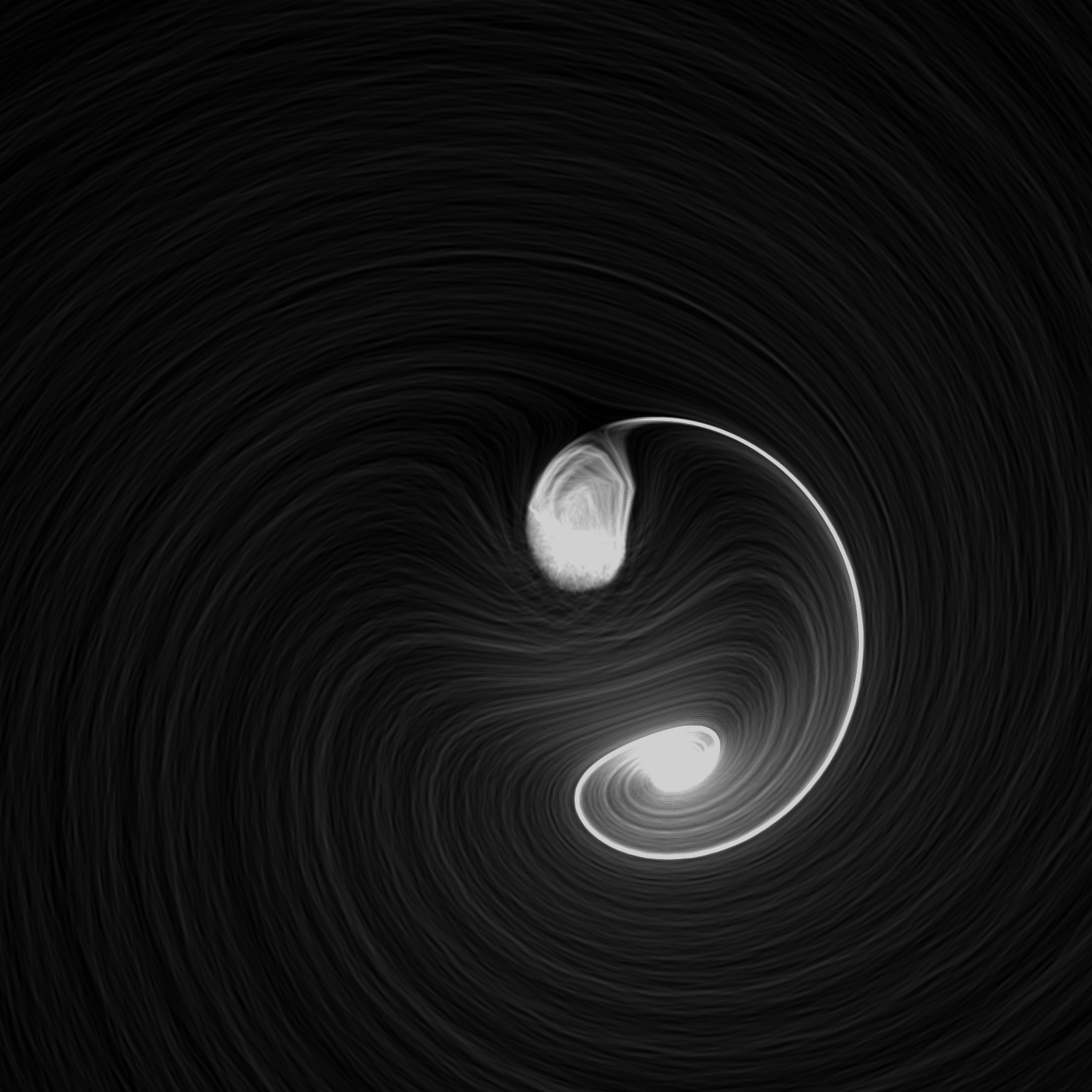
The trajectories of 2000 random points in an Ikeda map with u = 0.918.

In chaos theory, the Ikeda map is a discrete-time dynamical system that produces a strange attractor. It was introduced in 1979 by the physicist Kensuke Ikeda as a model for the behavior of light within a nonlinear optical resonator. The map demonstrates how a simple set of rules can lead to complex, chaotic behavior through a process of repeated rotation, scaling, and translation—a "stretch and fold" operation common in chaotic systems.

The map is defined by an iterative function on the complex plane. For a given complex number $z_n$, the next value is calculated as:
$$z_{n+1} = A + B z_n e^{i (|z_n|^2 + C)}$$
Here, $z_n$ represents the electric field in the resonator at step $n$. The parameters $A$ and $C$ relate to the external laser light and the phase of the system, while $B$ (where $B \leq 1$) is a dissipation parameter representing energy loss in the resonator.

A commonly studied real-valued version of the map is given by the two-dimensional equations:
$$x_{n+1} = 1 + u (x_n \cos t_n - y_n \sin t_n), \,$$
$$y_{n+1} = u (x_n \sin t_n + y_n \cos t_n),$$
where $u$ is a parameter and
$$t_n = 0.4 - \frac{6}{1+x_n^2+y_n^2}.$$
For values of the parameter $u \geq 0.6$, this system exhibits chaotic behavior, generating the characteristic fractal attractor shown in the article's images.

== Attractor ==
This animation shows how the attractor of the system changes as the parameter $u$ is varied from 0.0 to 1.0 in steps of 0.01. The Ikeda dynamical system is simulated for 500 steps, starting from 20,000 randomly placed starting points. The last 20 points of each trajectory are plotted to depict the attractor. Note the bifurcation of attractor points as $u$ is increased.

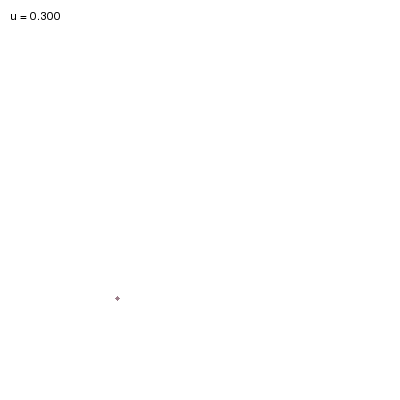
$u=0.3$

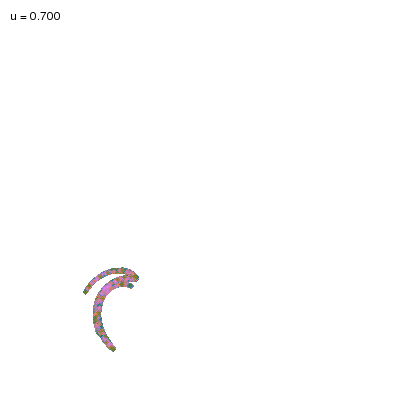
$u=0.7$

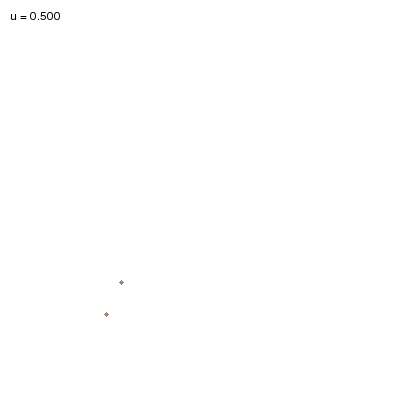
$u=0.5$

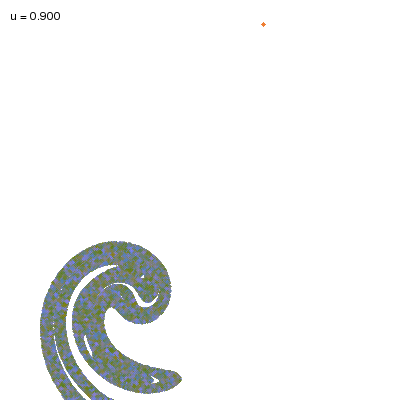
$u=0.9$

== Point trajectories ==
The plots below show trajectories of 200 random points for various values of $u$. The inset plot on the left shows an estimate of the attractor while the inset on the right shows a zoomed in view of the main trajectory plot.

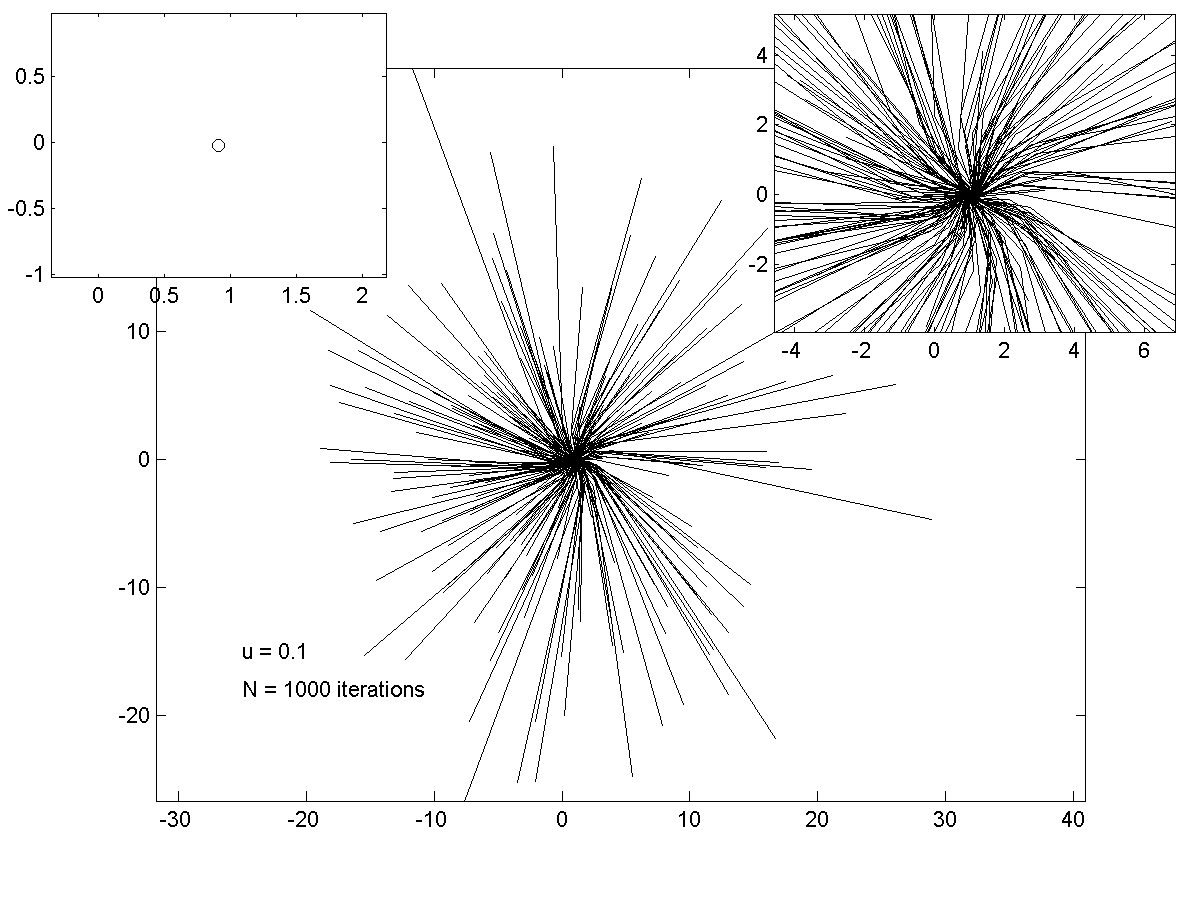
u = 0.1

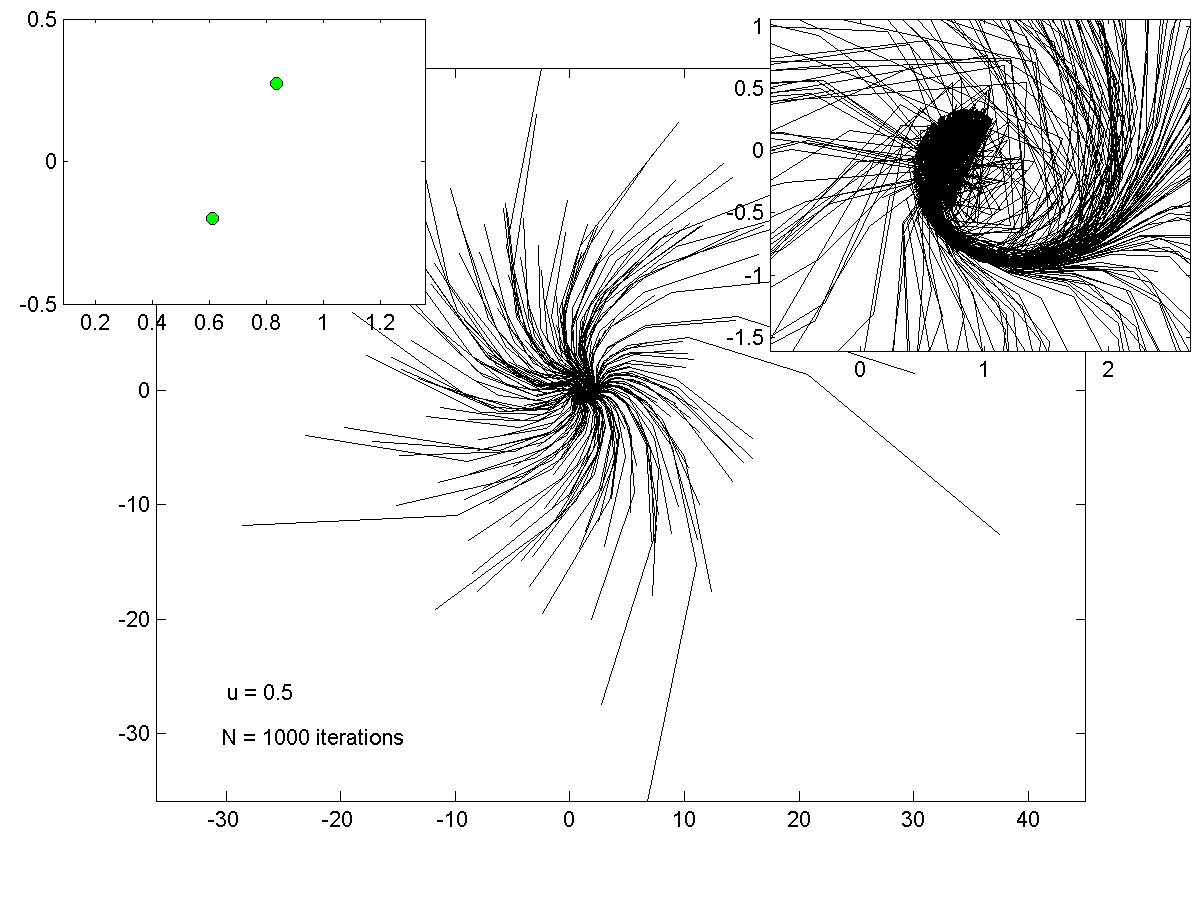
u = 0.5

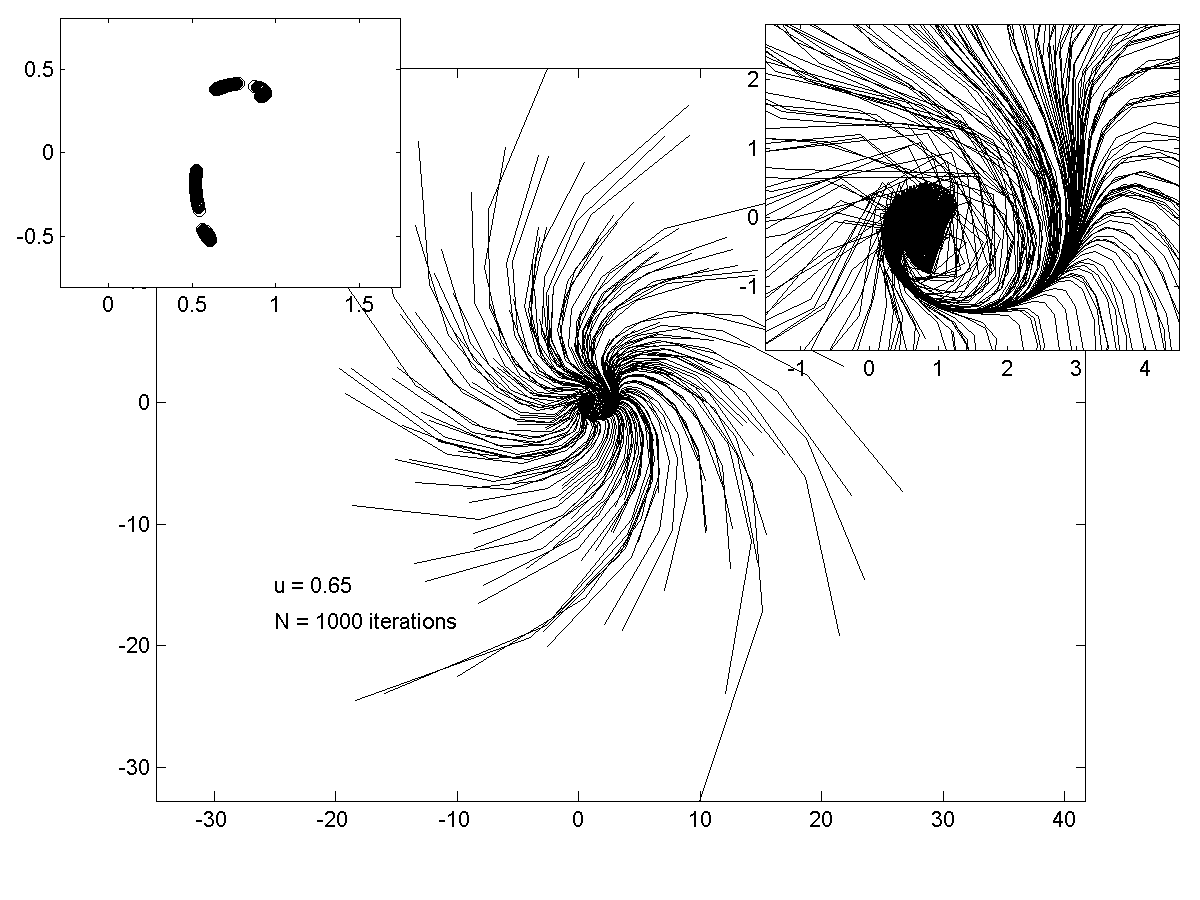
u = 0.65

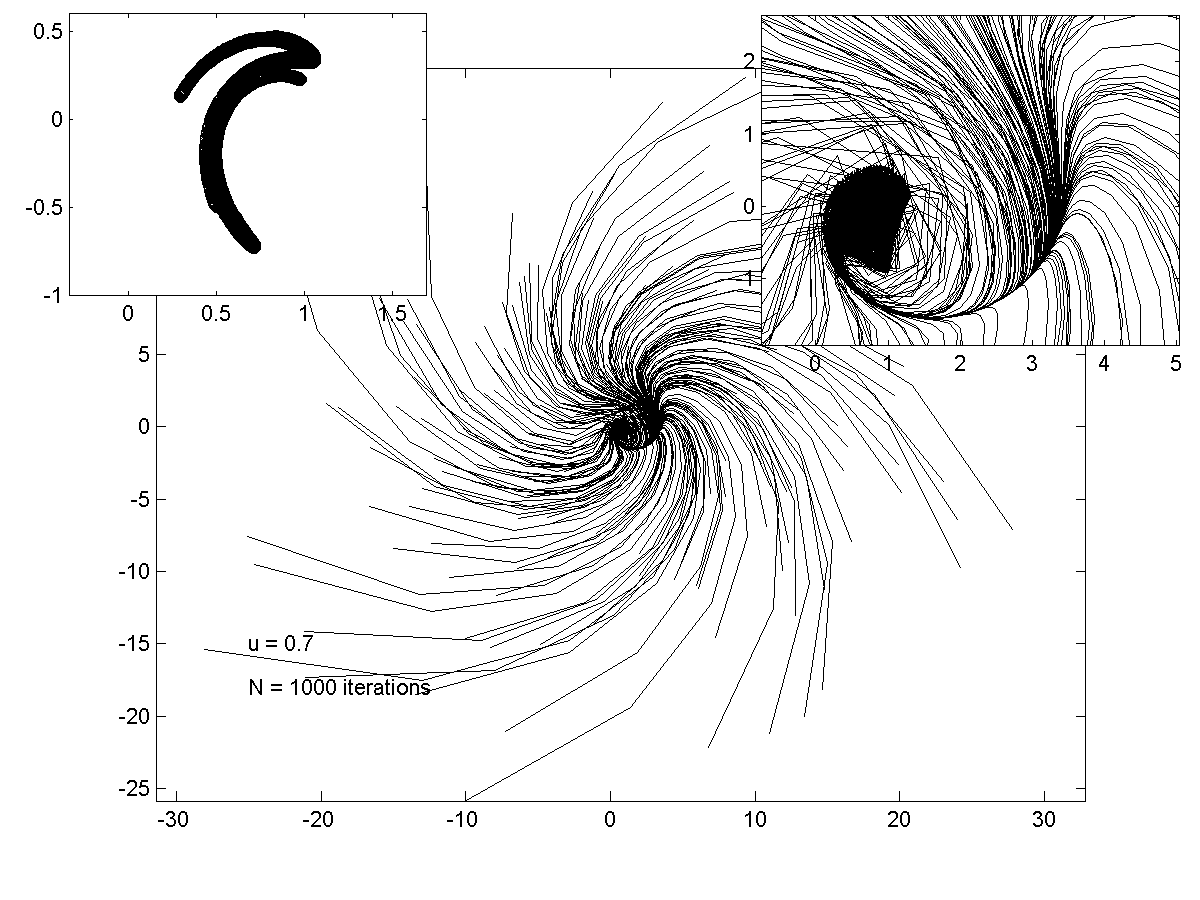
u = 0.7

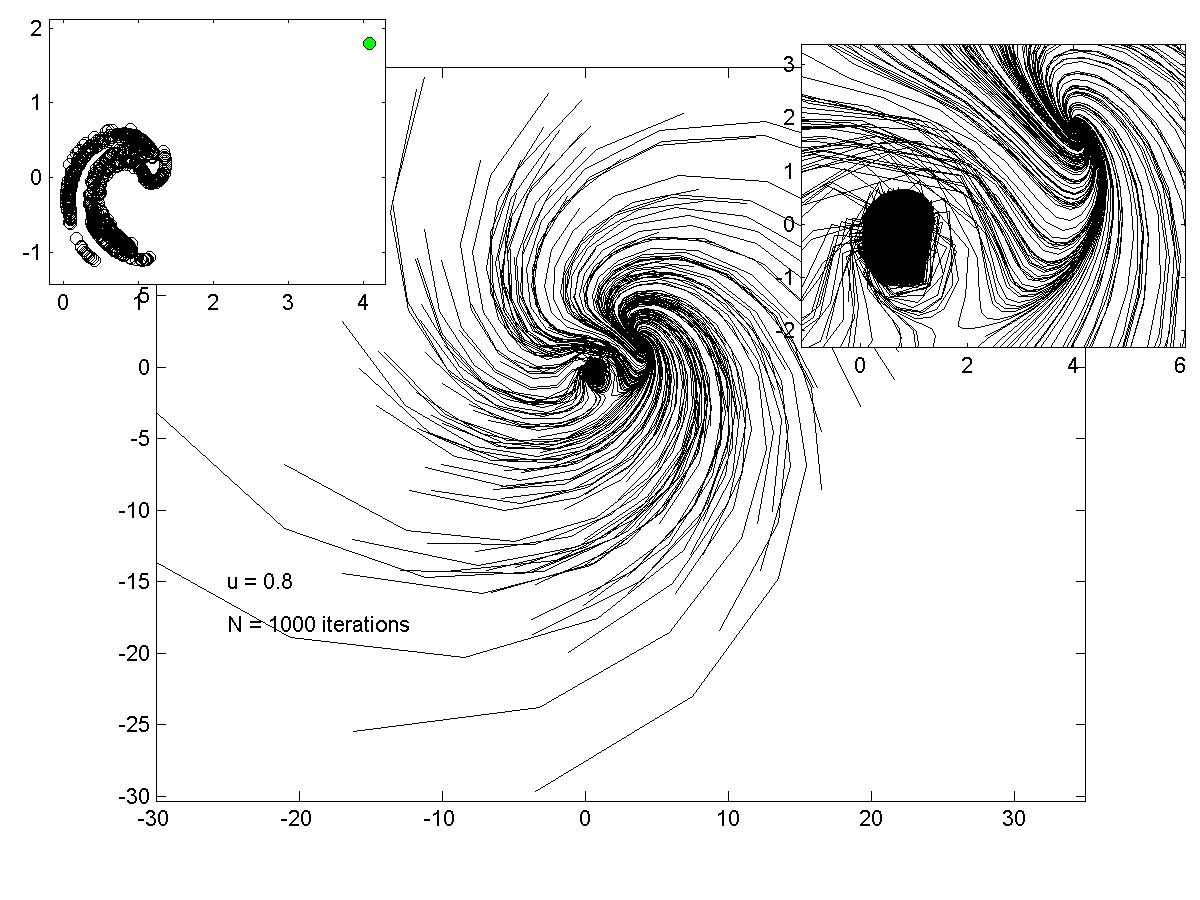
u = 0.8

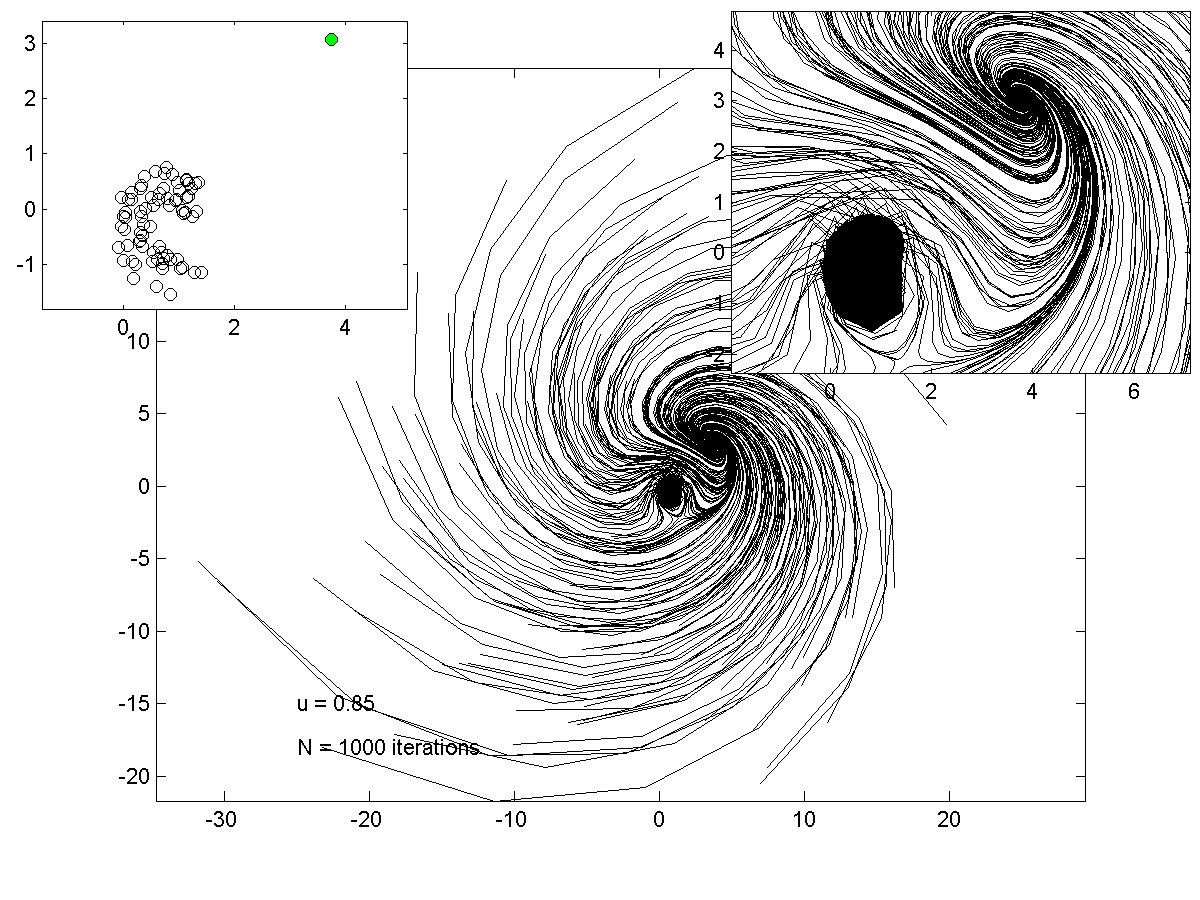
u = 0.85

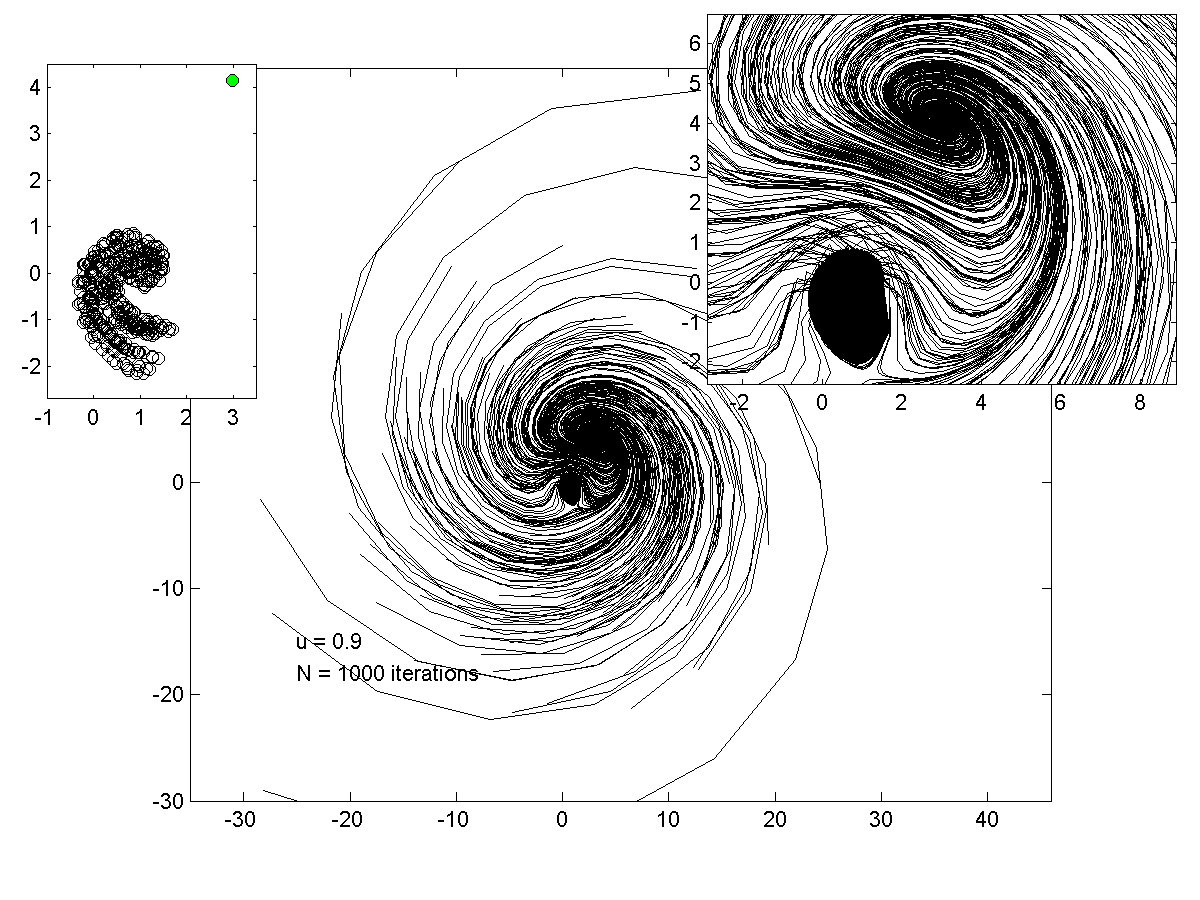
u = 0.9

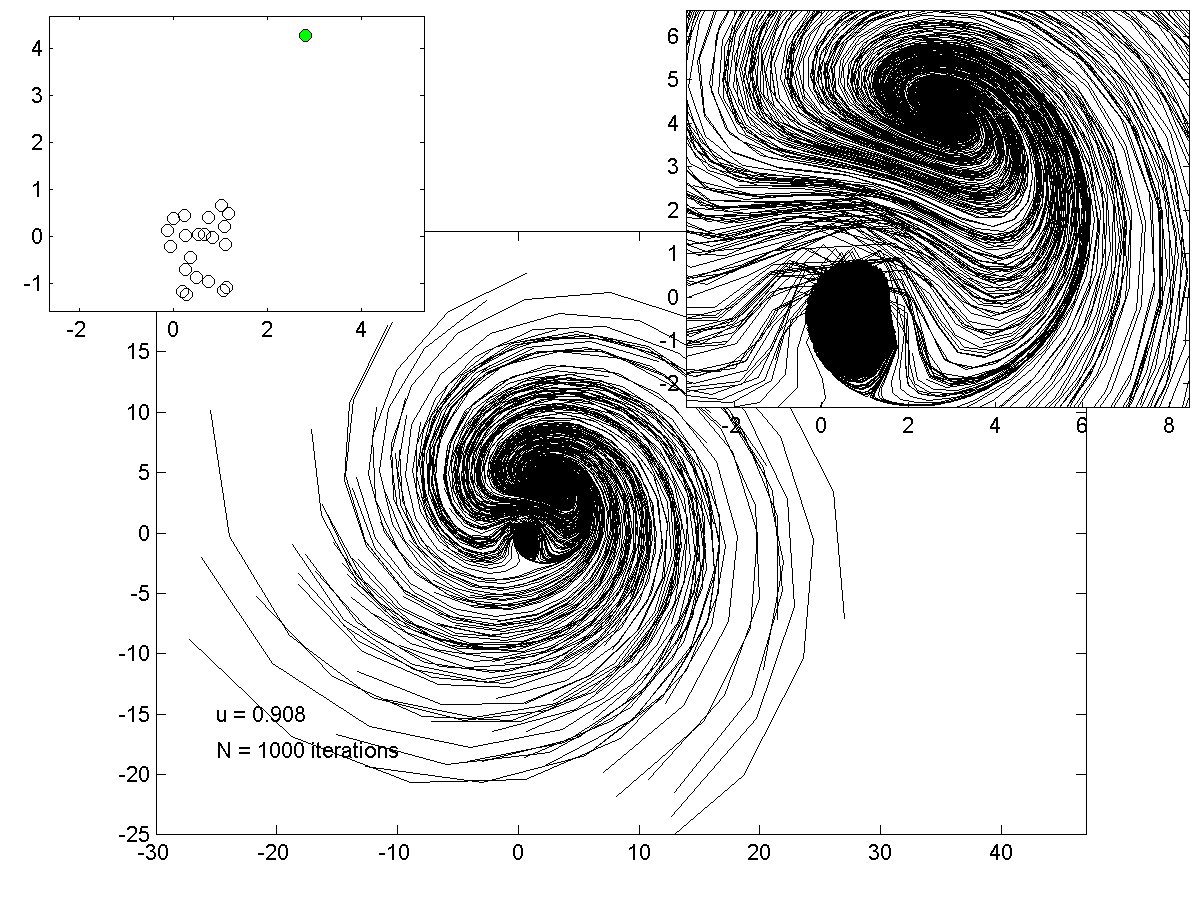
u = 0.908

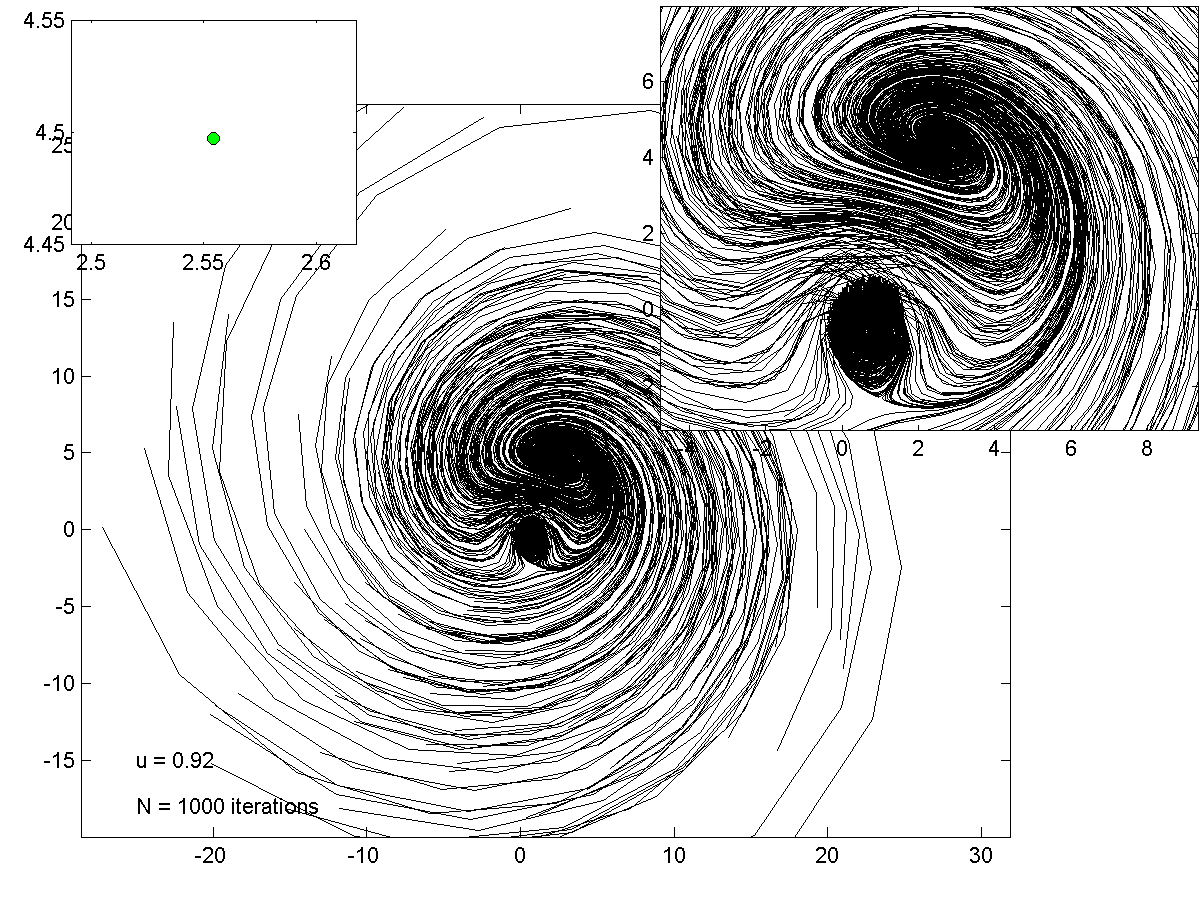
u = 0.92

=== Octave/MATLAB code for point trajectories ===
The Ikeda map is composed by a rotation (by a radius-dependent angle), a rescaling, and a shift. This "stretch and fold" process gives rise to the strange attractor.

The Octave/MATLAB code to generate these plots is given below:

% u = ikeda parameter
% option = what to plot
%  'trajectory' - plot trajectory of random starting points
%  'limit' - plot the last few iterations of random starting points
function ikeda(u, option)
P = 200; % how many starting points
N = 1000; % how many iterations
Nlimit = 20; % plot these many last points for 'limit' option
 
x = randn(1, P) * 10; % the random starting points
y = randn(1, P) * 10;
 
for n = 1:P,
    X = compute_ikeda_trajectory(u, x(n), y(n), N);
     
    switch option
        case 'trajectory' % plot the trajectories of a bunch of points
            plot_ikeda_trajectory(X); hold on;

        case 'limit'
            plot_limit(X, Nlimit); hold on;

        otherwise
            disp('Not implemented');
    end
end

axis tight; axis equal
text(- 25, - 15, ['u = ' num2str(u)]);
text(- 25, - 18, ['N = ' num2str(N) ' iterations']);
end

% Plot the last n points of the curve - to see end point or limit cycle
function plot_limit(X, n)
plot(X(end - n:end, 1), X(end - n:end, 2), 'ko');
end

% Plot the whole trajectory
function plot_ikeda_trajectory(X)
plot(X(:, 1), X(:, 2), 'k');
% hold on; plot(X(1,1), X(1,2), 'bo', 'markerfacecolor', 'g'); hold off
end

% u is the ikeda parameter
% x,y is the starting point
% N is the number of iterations
function [X] = compute_ikeda_trajectory(u, x, y, N)
X = zeros(N, 2);
X(1, :) = [x y];
 
for n = 2:N
     
    t = 0.4 - 6 / (1 + x ^ 2 + y ^ 2);
    x1 = 1 + u * (x * cos(t) - y * sin(t));
    y1 = u * (x * sin(t) + y * cos(t));
    x = x1;
    y = y1;

    X(n, :) = [x y];
end
end

=== Python code for point trajectories ===
import math

import matplotlib.pyplot as plt
import numpy as np

def main(u: float, points=200, iterations=1000, nlim=20, limit=False, title=True):
    """
    Args:
        u:float
            ikeda parameter
        points:int
            number of starting points
        iterations:int
            number of iterations
        nlim:int
            plot these many last points for 'limit' option. Will plot all points if set to zero
        limit:bool
            plot the last few iterations of random starting points if True. Else Plot trajectories.
        title:[str, NoneType]
            display the name of the plot if the value is affirmative
    """
    
    x = 10 * np.random.randn(points, 1)
    y = 10 * np.random.randn(points, 1)
    
    for n in range(points):
        X = compute_ikeda_trajectory(u, x[n][0], y[n][0], iterations)
        
        if limit:
            plot_limit(X, nlim)
            tx, ty = 2.5, -1.8
            
        else:
            plot_ikeda_trajectory(X)
            tx, ty = -30, -26
    
    plt.title(f"Ikeda Map ({u=:.2g}, {iterations=})") if title else None
    return plt

def compute_ikeda_trajectory(u: float, x: float, y: float, N: int):
    """Calculate a full trajectory

    Args:
        u - is the ikeda parameter
        x, y - coordinates of the starting point
        N - the number of iterations

    Returns:
        An array.
    """
    X = np.zeros((N, 2))
    
    for n in range(N):
        X[n] = np.array((x, y))
        
        t = 0.4 - 6 / (1 + x ** 2 + y ** 2)
        x1 = 1 + u * (x * math.cos(t) - y * math.sin(t))
        y1 = u * (x * math.sin(t) + y * math.cos(t))
        
        x = x1
        y = y1   
        
    return X

def plot_limit(X, n: int) -> None:
    """
    Plot the last n points of the curve - to see end point or limit cycle

    Args:
        X: np.array
            trajectory of an associated starting-point
        n: int
            number of "last" points to plot
    """
    plt.plot(X[-n:, 0], X[-n:, 1], 'ko')

def plot_ikeda_trajectory(X) -> None:
    """
    Plot the whole trajectory

    Args:
        X: np.array
            trajectory of an associated starting-point
    """
    plt.plot(X[:,0], X[:, 1], "k")

if __name__ == "__main__":
    main(0.9, limit=True, nlim=0).show()
