= Laura A. Schaefer =

American mechanical engineer

Laura Atkinson Schaefer is an American mechanical engineer whose research concerns the computational modeling of heat and fluid flow, with applications focusing on energy systems including the heat and energy management of buildings and the design of fuel cells. She is Burton J. and Ann McMurtry Chair and Professor of Mechanical Engineering at Rice University, where she chairs the Department of Mechanical Engineering.

== Education and career ==
Schaefer graduated from Rice University in 1995, with a double major in English and mechanical engineering. She went to Georgia Tech for graduate study in mechanical engineering, minoring in operations research, under the supervision of Samuel V. Shelton. She earned a master's degree in 1997 and completed her Ph.D. in 2000; her doctoral dissertation was Single Pressure Absorption Heat Pump Analysis.

She joined the Mechanical Engineering and Materials Science Department of the University of Pittsburgh as an assistant professor in 2000, became Bicentennial Board of Visitors Faculty Fellow in 2005, and was promoted to associate professor in 2006 and full professor in 2013. In 2015 she returned to Rice University, taking her present position as Burton J. and Ann McMurtry Chair and Professor of Mechanical Engineering and as chair of the Department of Mechanical Engineering.

== Recognition ==
Schaefer was elected as a Fellow of the American Society of Mechanical Engineers in 2011.

== Personal life ==
Schaefer is married to Andrew J. Schaefer, a professor of computational and applied mathematics at Rice University who is also a Rice University alumnus.
