= René Pomeau =

René Pomeau (20 February 1917 in Beautiran – 26 February 2000 in Clamart) was an eminent French scholar of eighteenth-century French literature generally recognised as one of the most expert authorities on Voltaire by the time of his death in 2000. His son is Yves Pomeau.

== Biography ==
René Pomeau was professor at the Sorbonne, member of the Académie des Sciences Morales et Politiques, Institut de France and ultimately president of the Société Littéraire de la France. His greatest achievements were the five large volumes, Voltaire en son temps, published by the Voltaire Foundation between 1985 and 1994.

== Works ==
- Voltaire en son temps, 1995, Voltaire Foundation
- La religion de Voltaire
- L'Âge classique
- L'Europe des Lumières, cosmopolitisme et unité européenne au XVIIIe
- Laclos ou le paradoxe
- Avec Madame du Châtelet
- Beaumarchais ou la bizarre Destinée
