= Maurice Lévy (physicist) =

French theoretical physicist (1922–2022)

4th president of the French Space Agency
- In office 1973–1976
- Preceded by: Jean-François Denisse
- Succeeded by: Hubert Curien

Personal details
- Born: 7 September 1922 Tlemcen, French Algeria
- Died: 13 April 2022 (aged 99) France
- Scientific career
- Education: University of Algiers; University of Paris
- Known for: Sigma model
- Workplaces: École normale supérieure Pierre and Marie Curie University
- Doctoral students: Loup Verlet; André Martin

Maurice Marc Lévy (7 September 1922 – 13 April 2022) was a French theoretical physicist known for his work on the Sigma model in particle physics. He was president of the CNES from 1973 to 1976.

== Education ==
Lévy was born in Tlemcen of the French Algeria. He obtained his baccalauréat at the Lycée Bugeaud in Algiers and then graduated in mathematics and physics from the University of Algiers. He then obtained a graduate degree in optics and entered the CNRS in 1945. He left Algeria for France and joined the Physical Research Laboratory of the Sorbonne (LRPS), directed by Jean Cabannes. After a brief stay at the University of Leiden, he defended his thesis in 1949 under the supervision of Jean Cabannes. Louis de Broglie participated in his thesis examination.

== Career ==
In 1949, Lévy visited the University of Manchester to work under the direction of Léon Rosenfeld. In 1950, he joined the Institute for Advanced Study in Princeton, directed by J. Robert Oppenheimer.

Lévy returned to France in 1952, became senior researcher at the CNRS and worked in the physics department of the École normale supérieure (ENS), directed by Yves Rocard. He taught quantum mechanics for twelve years to first-year students at the ENS. He was appointed professor at the Bordeaux Faculty of Science in 1953, then at the Paris Faculty of Science in 1954. He participated with Yves Rocard in the creation of the Linear Accelerator Laboratory (LAL). In 1960, he established the physics summer school of Cargèse in Corsica; eventually, the program grew to the Institut d'Études Scientifiques de Cargèse.

Lévy was a professor at the Pierre and Marie Curie University right from its foundation in 1971, and a researcher at the Laboratory of Theoretical and High Energy Physics (LPTHE), collaborating in particular with Jean-Louis Basdevant and with John Iliopoulos.

== Notable research and recognition ==
In 1960, he co-authored with Murray Gell-Mann a seminal paper on the Sigma model, which served as a cynosure for particle physics in the following decades, providing the modern framework for understanding the weak interactions and their interplay with chiral symmetry breaking by the strong interactions.

He was made Commandeur of the Légion d'honneur on 13 July 1993.
