= Prix Félix-Robin =

The Prix Félix-Robin is a prize awarded by the Société française de physique to reward a physicist for a career’s work.

The prize originated from the will of the engineer Félix Robin. He donated money aimed at rewarding remarkable scientific work carried out by a Frenchman in France. The prize was first awarded in 1922.

== Laureates ==
- Institut d'optique (1917)
- Maurice de Broglie (1922)
- Jean Cabannes (1924)
- F. Croze (1926)
- Antonin Andant (1928)
- D. Chalonge (1930)
- Étienne Hirsch (1931)
- G. Foex (1932)
- A. Dauvillier (1934)
- Henri Adolphe Gondet (1936)
- Louis Néel (1938)
- Jean-Paul Mathieu (1940)
- Louis Leprince-Ringuet (1942)
- Albert Arnulf (1944)
- Alfred Kastler (1946)
- Gaston Dupouy (1948)
- Henri Bizette (1950)
- Jacques Yvon (1952)
- Jean Brossel (1954)
- Georges-Albert Boutry (1956)
- Pierre Biquard (1958)
- Maurice Lévy (1959)
- Pierre Dufieux (1960)
- Serge Nikitine (1961)
- Maurice Françon (1962)
- Jacques Friedel (1963)
- L. Weill (1964)
- Raimond Castaing (1965)
- Michel Soutif (1966)
- Jacques Thirion (1967)
- Claude Bloch (1968)
- Ionel Solomon (1969)
- André Herpin (1970)
- Evry Schatzman (1971)
- Vittorio Luzzati (1972)
- Charles Peyrou (1973)
- Pierre Aigrain (1974)
- Louis Michel (1975)
- Jacques Prentki (1976)
- Bernard Cagnac (1977)
- Henri Benoit (1978)
- Jean-Louis Steinberg (1979)
- Bernard Jacrot (1980)
- Marianne Lambert (1981)
- Marc Lefort (1982)
- Pierre Marin (1983)
- Jacques des Cloizeaux (1984)
- James Lequeux (1985)
- Claude Mercier (1986)
- Gérard Mainfray (1987)
- Claude Itzykson (1988)
- Sidney Leach (1989)
- Bernard Jancovici (1990)
- Claude Benoit à la Guillaume (1991)
- André Samain (1992)
- Georges Amsel (1993)
- Yves Petroff (1994)
- Pierre Bareyre (1995)
- Jean-Michel Besson (1996)
- Alain Omont (1997)
- Anne-Marie Levelut (1998)
- Michel Spiro (1999)
- François Ducastelle (2000)
- Jacques Haissinsky (2001)
- Jacques Bauche (2002)
- Dominique Levesque (2003)
- Liliane Léger (2004)
- Michel Lannoo (2005)
- Claude Boccara (2006)
- Jean-Eudes Augustin (2007)
- Rémi Jullien (2008)
- Mikhail Dyakonov (2009)
- Élisabeth Giacobino (2010)
- Henri Godfrin (2011)
- Jean-Pierre Lasota (2012)
- Jean-Pierre Gauyacq (2013)
- Sydney Galès (2014)
- Pawel Pieranski (2015)
- Danielle Dowek (2017)
- François Nez (2019)
- Équipe « Mottronics » de l'Institut des matériaux de Nantes (2023)
- Magali Deleuil (2025)
