= Verlet =

Verlet may refer to:

- Alice Verlet (1873–1934), Belgian-born operatic coloratura soprano
- Blandine Verlet (1942–2018), French harpsichordist
- Loup Verlet (born 1931), French physicist
- Raoul Verlet (1857–1923), French sculptor
- Verlet integration, a technique for computer simulation of molecular dynamics developed by Loup Verlet
- Verlet list, a data structure useful in computer simulations of systems of particles
