= Jean-Loup Delcroix =

French physicist

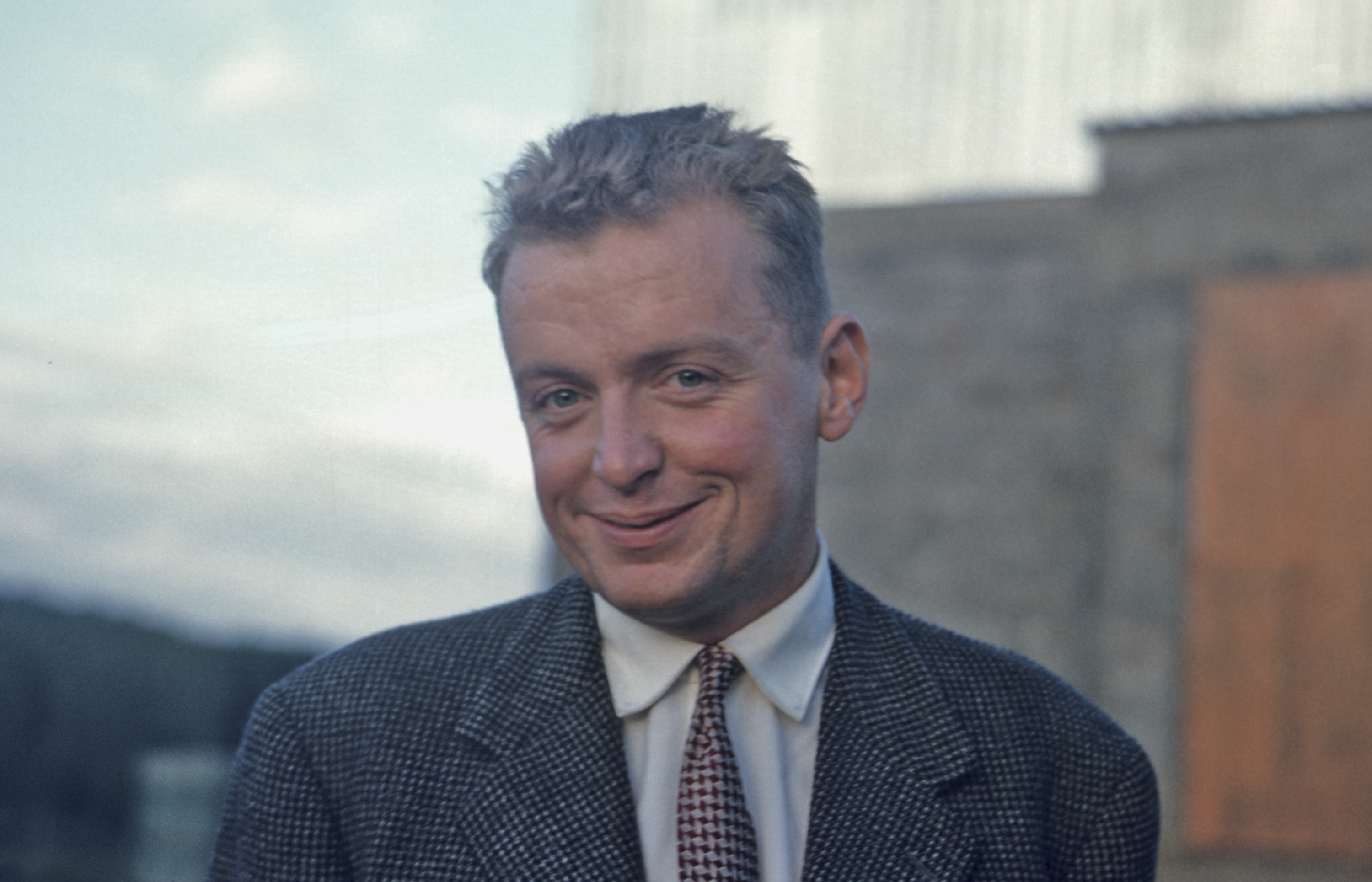
- at the Orsay accelerator, 1957
- Born: July 15, 1924; Voiron
- Died: May 22, 2003 (aged 78); Arpajon
- Citizenship: France
- Education: ENS Paris; University of Paris
- Scientific career
- Fields: physics
- Workplaces: Paris-Sud University;

Jean-Loup Delcroix (1924–2003) was a French physicist, specializing in the physics of gases and plasmas.

== Biography ==
Jean-Loup Delcroix received secondary education at Lycée Janson-de-Sailly in Paris and Lycée Champollion in Grenoble. He matriculated in 1944 at ENS Paris and graduated there in 1948 with outstanding rank in the agrégation in physics. He graduated in 1953 with a doctorate from the University of Paris. His thesis is entitled Étude des propriétés statiques des charges d'espace du type magnétron. Under the supervision of Yves Rocard, he participated in the construction and start-up of the linear accelerator at Orsay from 1952 until 1960. At Paris-Sud University he was a maître de conférences (MCF) from 1960 to 1965 and a professor from 1965 to 1990, when he retired as professor emeritus. In 1960 Delcroix formed Paris-Sud University's Laboratoire de Physique des Gaz et des Plasmas (LPGP), in association with the CNRS. He was the laboratory's director from 1960 to 1984. He made important contributions to the physics of gas discharges and low-temperature plasmas. During the early 1970s he led a research group on gas discharges with applications to gas laser physics.

At Paris-Sud University, Delcroix created in 1960 a graduate curriculum in plasma physics at the level of the diplôme d’études approfondies (DEA). His curriculum became a model at other French universities. His lectures on plasma physics formed the basis of three monographs originally published from 1959 to 1966. In 1961 with Jean-François Denisse, he published an important monograph on waves in plasmas. Delcroix, in collaboration with Abraham Bers (1930–2015), wrote a two-volume textbook entitled Physique des Plasmas, published in 1994.

From 1965 to 1976 Delcroix was the director of scientific research for the Direction des Recherches et Moyens d’Essai (D.R.M.E.), France's agency for development and coordination of military research. The D.R.M.E. was created in 1961 by Lucien Malavard (1910–1990). From 1978 to 1989 Delcroix was the Director General of the École supérieure d'électricité (Supélec). Under his directorship, Supélec expanded to three campuses and modernized its curriculum. From 1982 to 2003 he was France's representative to the Committee on Data of the International Science Council (CODATA). Beginning in 1975, Delacroix with several colleagues created and maintained GAPHYOR (GAz PHysique ORsay), a database and computerized retrieval system for atomic and molecular physics.

The French government appointed him Chevalier des Palmes académiques (1966), Chevalier de la Légion d'honneur (1969), Commandeur de l'ordre national du Mérite (1984), and Officier de la Legion d'honneur (1989).

He and his first wife had a son and two daughters. After divorce from his first wife, J.-L. Delcroix remarried and became the stepfather of one child. He was predeceased by his second wife.

=== Articles ===
- Bayet, Michel; Delcroix, Jean-Loup; Denisse, Jean-François (1954). "Théorie cinétique des plasmas homogènes faiblement ionisés. I" (PDF). Journal de Physique et le Radium. 15 (12): 795–803. doi:10.1051/jphysrad:019540015012079501.
- Bayet, Michel; Delcroix, Jean-Loup; Denisse, Jean-François (1955). "Théorie cinétique des plasmas homogènes faiblement ionisés. II". Journal de Physique et le Radium. 16 (4): 274–280. doi:10.1051/jphysrad:01955001604027400.
- Bayet, Michel; Delcroix, Jean-Loup; Denisse, Jean-François (1956). "Théorie cinétique des plasmas homogènes faiblement ionisés - III. l'Opérateur de collision dans le cas du gaz de Lorentz imparfait". Journal de Physique et le Radium. 17 (11): 923–930. doi:10.1051/jphysrad:019560017011092300.
- Bayet, Michel; Delcroix, Jean-Loup; Denisse, Jean-François (1956). "Théorie cinétique des plasmas homogènes faiblement ionisés - IV. Étude de l'évolution de la partie isotrope de la fonction de distribution". Journal de Physique et le Radium. 17 (12): 1005–1009. doi:10.1051/jphysrad:0195600170120100500.
- Bayet, Michel; Delcroix, Jean-Loup; Denisse, Jean-François (1956). "Théorie cinétique des plasmas homogènes faiblement ionisés - IV. Étude de l'évolution de la partie isotrope de la fonction de distribution". Journal de Physique et le Radium. 17 (12): 1005–1009. doi:10.1051/jphysrad:0195600170120100500.
- Delcroix, J. L.; Minoo, H.; Trindade, A. R. (1969). "Gas Fed Multichannel Hollow Cathode Arcs". Review of Scientific Instruments. 40 (12): 1555–1562. Bibcode:1969RScI...40.1555D. doi:10.1063/1.1683861.
- Delcroix, Jean-Loup; Trindade, Armando Rocha (1974). Hollow Cathode Arcs. Advances in Electronics and Electron Physics. Vol. 35. pp. 87–190. doi:10.1016/S0065-2539(08)60281-4. ISBN 9780120145355.
- Delcroix, J.-L.; Matos-Ferreira, C.; Ricard, A. (1975). "Metastable atoms and molecules in ionized gases".
- Ferreira, C. M.; Delcroix, J. L. (1978). "Theory of the hollow cathode arc". Journal of Applied Physics. 49 (4): 2380–2395. Bibcode:1978JAP....49.2380F. doi:10.1063/1.325126.

=== Books ===
- Delcroix, J.-L. (1959). "Introduction à la théorie des gaz ionisés". Il Nuovo Cimento. 13 (3): 671. Bibcode:1959NCim...13..671B. doi:10.1007/BF02732784.; translated into English: Introduction to the theory of ionized gases. Interscience Publishers. 1960. ASIN B0000CL0JM
- Denisse, J.-F.; Delcroix, J.-L. (1961). Théorie des Ondes dans les Plasmas. Paris: Dunod.
- Delcroix, J.-L. (1963). Physique des plasmas, Tome I.; translated into English: Plasma Physics. Wiley. 1965.
- Delcroix, J.-L. (1966). Physique des plasmas, Tome II.; translated into English: Plasma Physics. Vol. II. Wiley. 1969.
- with Abraham Bers: Physique des plasmas, EDP Sciences, 1994; Delcroix, Jean-Loup; Bers, Abraham (1994). tome 1. EDP Sciences. ISBN 2868833683. Delcroix, Jean-Loup; Bers, Abraham (1994). tome 2. EDP Sciences. ISBN 2868833691.
