= Chiuni =

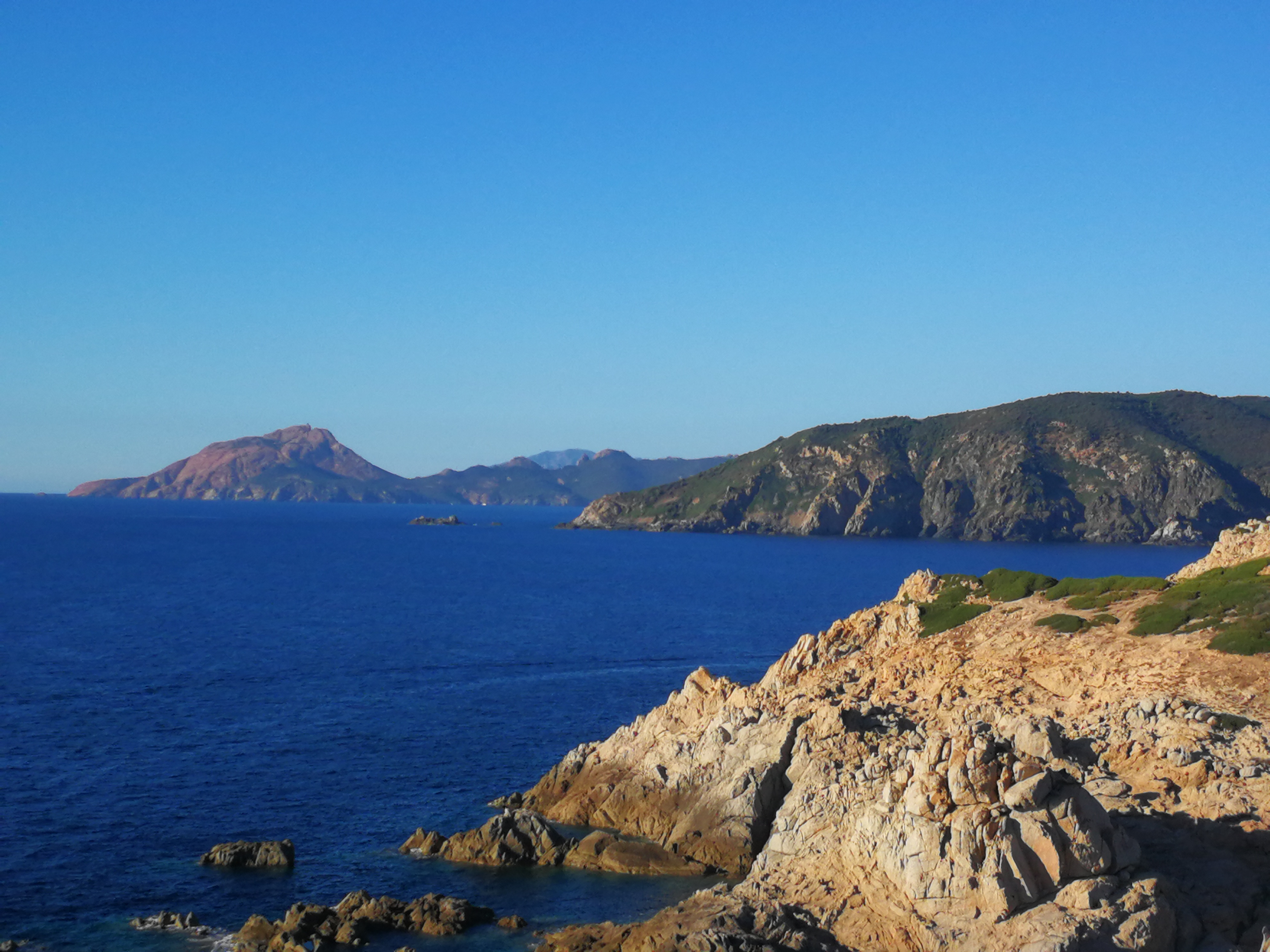
- Anse de Chiuni (bay)

- Location within Corsica Location within France
- Native name: Rivière Chiuni (French)

Location
- Country: France
- Region: Corsica
- Department: Corse-du-Sud

Physical characteristics
- Mouth: Mediterranean Sea
  - coordinates: 42.1713°N 8.5871°E
- Length: 16.06 kilometres (9.98 mi)

The Chiuni (French: Rivière Chiuni) is a coastal river in the west of the department of Corse-du-Sud, Corsica, France.

== Course ==
The Chiuni is 16.06 kilometres (9.98 mi) long. It crosses the communes of Cargèse, Marignana and Piana. The Chiuni rises in the commune of Marignana to the west of the 1,226 metres (4,022 ft) Capu a é Macenule. The source is at an altitude of 1,123 metres (3,684 ft). It flows in a generally east-southeast direction to enter the sea in the Golfe de Chiuni. There is a beach, the Plage de Chiuni, at the mouth of the river. From the beach there is a view of Capu d'Orchinu and its Genoese tower, the Torra d'Orchinu.

== Tributaries ==
The following streams (ruisseaux) are tributaries of the Chiuni (ordered by length) and sub-tributaries:

- Fornellu: 7 km (4.3 mi)
- Forcu a e Teghie: 7 km (4.3 mi)
  - Ruscia: 3 km (1.9 mi)
    - Malo: 3 km (1.9 mi)
- Chesaccia: 4 km (2.5 mi)
  - Aculone: 2 km (1.2 mi)
  - Pascianu: 1 km (0.62 mi)
- Persicu: 3 km (1.9 mi)
  - Truscielli: 2 km (1.2 mi)
- Milari: 3 km (1.9 mi)
- Ambione: 2 km (1.2 mi)
- Cario: 2 km (1.2 mi)
- Finucchiaghia: 2 km (1.2 mi)

== Sources ==
- "Plage de Chiuni", iflyer.corsica (in French), August Marine
- "Relation: Rivière Chiuni (8832465)", OpenStreetMap
- "Rivière Chiuni", Sandre (in French)
