= Jean-François Denisse =

French astronomer (1915–2014)

3rd President of the French Space Agency
- In office 1967–1973
- Preceded by: Jean Coulomb
- Succeeded by: Maurice Lévy

Personal details
- Born: May 16, 1915 San Quentin
- Died: November 17, 2014 (aged 99) 9^{e} arrondissement de Paris
- Scientific career
- Awards: Prix Holweck (1962); Prix Jules Janssen (1965); Prix des trois physiciens (1968)
- Fields: astronomy, astrophysics
- Workplaces: Paris Observatory; CNES
- Doctoral advisor: Yves Rocard

Notes
- The artist Julien Denisse (1866–1943) was the father of Jean-François Denisse.

Jean-François Denisse (1915–2014) was a French astronomer and one of the leading pioneers of radio astronomy in France.

== Education and career ==
Jean-François Denisse matriculated in 1936 at the École Normale Supérieure (ENS Paris) and in 1941 passed the agrégation in physical sciences. He then became a physics teacher at Dakar's lycée (high school). Upon his return to France in 1946, he became a graduate student studying radio astronomy in the physics laboratory of ENS Paris. From 1948 to 1949 he studied the science and technology of antennas and receivers at the National Bureau of Standards in Washington, DC. He received his doctorate in 1950. His thesis, supervised by Yves Rocard, dealt with solar activity involving the propagation of waves in plasmas.

In 1947 at ENS Paris, Rocard founded a group for the study of radio astronomy. The first two to join Rocard's group were Denisse and Jean-Louis Steinberg, followed shortly afterward by Émile-Jacques Blum. From 1951 to 1953 as an intermittent visiting scientist at Dakar's École des Hautes Études (now part of Cheikh Anta Diop University), Denisse led members of his group as they made African solar observations, particularly during partial eclipses. In 1953 the group on radio astronomy moved to the Paris Observatory in Meudon, and Denisse became the head of the group. He was from 1954 to 1968 employed at the Paris Observatory and was from 1963 to 1968 the observatory's director, as the successor to André-Louis Danjon. Denisse was from 1955 to 1961 the president of the IAU Commission 40 for Radio Astronomy. He supervised the creation of the Paris Observatory's Station de Radioastronomie de Nançay. The station's first large instrument, a solar internee rometer, was completed in 1956. Denisse directed the construction of the station's large radio telescope, which was completed in 1967. This radio telescope, one of the world's largest, is still in operation.

In the later part of his career, Denisse's focus was more on administrative work. He made fundamental contribution to the development of French and European astronomy, both ground-based and space-based. From 1968 to 1971 he was the founder of the Institut national d'astronomie et de géophysique (INAG), which became the Institut national des sciences de l'univers (INSU). He was the president from 1967 to 1973 of Centre national d'études spatiales (CNES), from 1974 to 1975 of the Bureau des longitudes, and from 1978 to 1982 of the Committee on Space Research (COSPAR).

== Honors and awards ==
Denisse was elected in 1967 a member of the Académie des sciences in 1967 a corresponding member of the International Academy of Astronautics, and in 1993 a member of Academia Europaea. He received numerous prestigious awards and honours. This includes the Prix Jules Janssen awarded to him by the Société astronomique de France in 1965. He was appointed Commandeur de la Légion d'honneur and Officier des palmes académiques.

== Selected publications ==
- Denisse, J. F. (1949). "Microwave solar noise and sunspot". The Astronomical Journal. 54: 183. Bibcode:1949AJ.....54Q.183D. doi:10.1086/106280.
- Denisse, J.-F.; Blum, E. J.; Steinberg, J.-L. (1952). "Radio Observations of the Solar Eclipses of September 1, 1951, and February 25, 1952". Nature. 170 (4318): 191–192. Bibcode:1952Natur.170..191D. doi:10.1038/170191a0. S2CID 4144483.
- Denisse, J. -F. (1956). "La radio astronomie et l'activité solaire". Ciel et Terre. 72: 205. Bibcode:1956C&T....72..205D.
- Kundu, M.R.; Denisse, J.-F. (1958). "Solar radiation on decimeter waves as an index for ionospheric studies". Journal of Atmospheric and Terrestrial Physics. 13 (1–2): 176–178. Bibcode:1958JATP...13..176K. doi:10.1016/0021-9169(58)90042-4.
- Blum, E.; Denisse, J.; Steinberg, J. (1958). "Radio Astronomy at the Meudon Observatory". Proceedings of the IRE. 46: 39–43. doi:10.1109/JRPROC.1958.286708. S2CID 51638674.
- Denisse, J. F. (1961). Solar Radio Phenomena and Their Physical Interpretation. translated from the original French by Samuel Katzoff
- Denisse, J.-F.; Delcroix, Jean-Loup (1961). Théorie des Ondes dans les Plasmas. Paris: Dunod.
- Sullivan, W. T., ed. (1984). "The early years of radio astronomy in France by J.-F. Denisse". The Early Years of Radio Astronomy: Reflections Fifty Years after Jansky's Discovery. Cambridge University Press. pp. 303–316.
  - Sullivan, W. T., ed. (2004). "The early years of radio astronomy in France by J.-F. Denisse". The Early Years of Radio Astronomy: Reflections Fifty Years After Jansky's Discovery. Cambridge University Press. pp. 303–316. ISBN 9780521616027. pbk reprint
