= André Martin (physicist) =

French particle physicist (1929–2020)

André Jean Martin (20 September 1929 in Paris – 11 November 2020 in Geneva) was a French particle physicist who worked at CNRS and CERN.

== Biography ==
After studying at the École normale supérieure (class of 1949), he began his career as a CNRS researcher under the direction of Maurice Lévy at the physics laboratory of the École Normale. He joined CERN in 1959 as a fellow in the Theory Division and became a permanent theoretical physicist in 1964.

In 1958 he helped found the Institut d'Études Scientifiques de Cargèse (Corsica).

In 1959 he married Alice-Anne Schubert, known as Schu, who died in 2016, and had two sons, Philippe and Thierry.

In 1994, he received the status of Physicist Emeritus, a status which has been renewed to this day. André Martin had scientific contacts all over the world: Europe, Asia, North America. He has made numerous visits to the United States, including two one-year visits to the Institute for Advanced Study at the invitation of J.R. Oppenheimer and to New York University, Stony Brook, at the invitation of C.N. Yang.

== Scientific work ==
The most interesting results of Maurice Lévy's thesis are the reconstruction of a separable interaction from a phase shift and an original demonstration of Levinson's theorem. At CERN he first worked on the analytical properties of the amplitude of scattering by a potential: on the one hand a demonstration of the Mandelstam representation for a Yukawa potential, on the other hand a new method for studying partial waves using the Laplace transform.

After the proof, due to Froissart, that the total effective cross section cannot grow faster than the logarithm squared of the energy, using the Mandelstam representation, he becomes interested in the amplitude of high-energy scattering. He demonstrates that Froissart's result for fixed-angle scattering can be improved. Finally, in 1966, he succeeded in demonstrating the validity of the Froissart bound using local field theory, without postulating the Mandelstam representation. In the meantime, in 1964, he obtains an absolute bound on the pion-pion scattering amplitude, this bound was considerably improved later.

He also proved the convergence of Padé's approximates for the levels of the anharmonic oscillator. He treated the relativistic effects on the instability of boson stars.

In 1977, stimulated by experimental results on quarkonium, formed from a heavy quark and antiquark, he began to study the order of energy levels in potentials, but it was not until 1984 that the best criterion, the Laplacian sign of potential, was found. At the same time, in 1981, he proposed a naïve model of potential to reproduce the levels of quarkonium, whose predictive power is extraordinary. This model was also applied to baryons formed from 3 quarks with great success by Jean Marc Richard. An overview of these results can be found in the book written with H.Grosse and a more recent unpublished review can be found in ArXives.

He invented a geometrical method to study the stability of 3-body charged particle systems.

André Martin has also studied low-energy scattering in the case of two dimensions of space as well as the counting of related states.

Recent work (after 2008) includes a lower bound on the inelastic rms cross-section, the sign of the real part of the forward scattering amplitud and a lower bound on the wide-angle scattering amplitude.

== Books ==
- F. Cheung and A. Martin: Analyticity Properties and Bounds on Scattering Amplitudes, Gordon nd Breach 1970
- A.Martin: Scattering Theory: Unitarity, Analyticity and Crossing, Notes byR Schrader, Springer-Verlag 1969
- (en) Harald Grosse (de) and A. Martin, Particle Physics and the Schrödinger Equation, Cambridge University Press, 1998 (ISBN 0-521-44425-X, read online [archive]).

== Awards ==
- Doctor honoris Causa of the University of Lausanne, 1972.
- Corresponding member of the French Academy of sciences, 1980–2007.
- Chevalier of the Légion d'Honneur, 1992
- Foreign Associate of the Indian Academy of Sciences
- Foreign Associate of the Tata Institute (Bombay)
- Gian-Carlo Wick Gold Medal, 2007
- Pomeranchuk Prize, Moscow 2010.
