= Jean-Louis Steinberg =

French astrophysicist (1922–2016)

- Born: Jean-Louis Émile David Steinberg; June 7, 1922; 5th arrondissement of Paris
- Died: January 21, 2016 (aged 93); 15th arrondissement of Paris
- Citizenship: France
- Education: ENS Paris
- Awards: Prix Félix-Robin (1979); Prix des trois physiciens (1993)
- Scientific career
- Fields: astronomy and astrophysics
- Workplaces: Paris Observatory

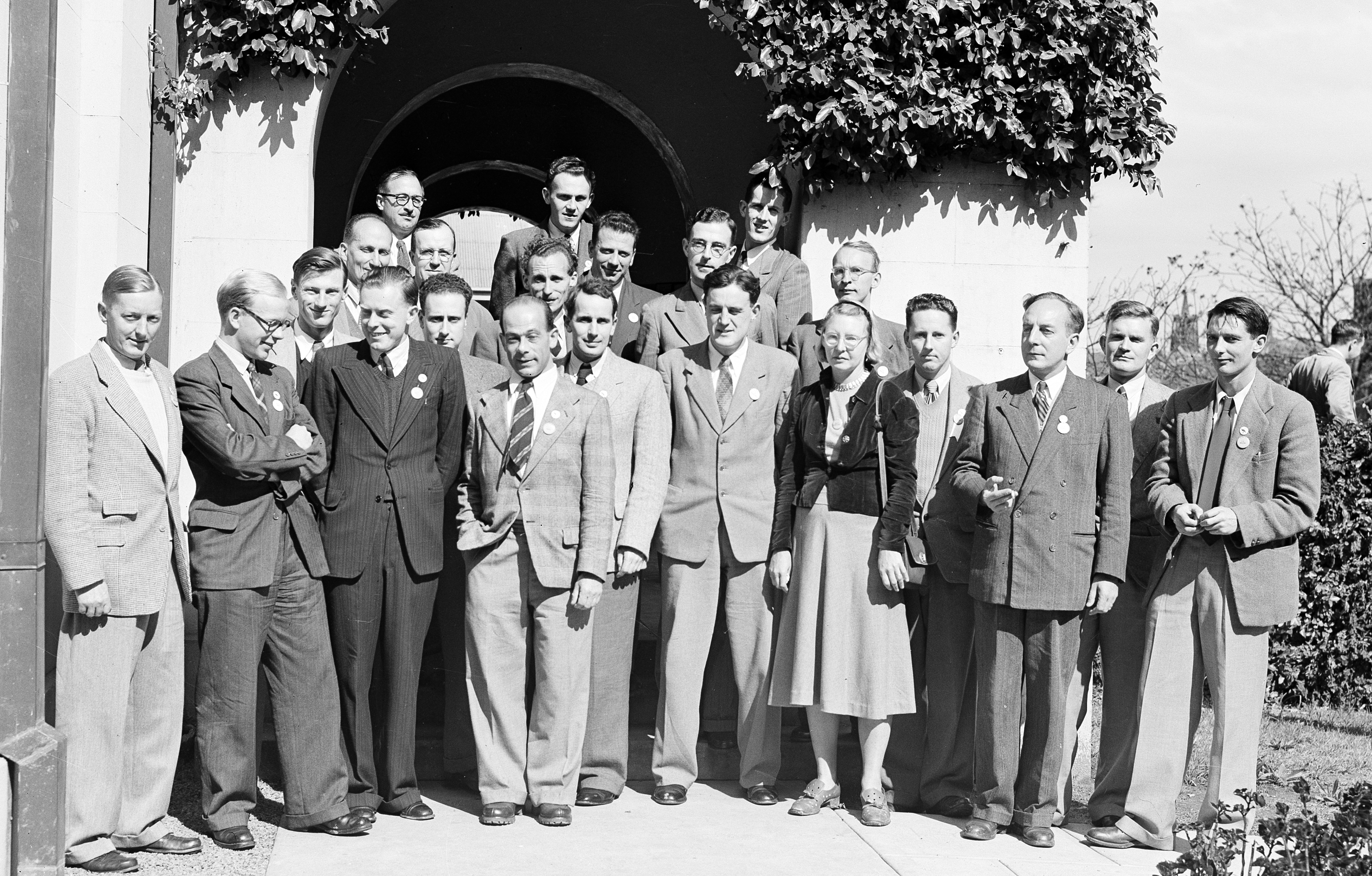
Steinberg (2nd row, 2nd from left) at conference of the International Union of Radio Science, Sydney 1952

Jean-Louis Steinberg (1922–2016) was one of the main pioneers of radio astronomy in France. In 1953 he was a co-founder of the project to create the Station de Radioastronomie de Nançay (which opened in 1956).

== Biography ==
Jean-Louis Steinberg had a 3 years older brother, a 13 years younger brother, and a sister who died shortly after birth. In World War I, their father was wounded at the Battle of Verdun and awarded the Croix de Guerre. Until he was 14 years old, J.-L. Steinberg attended the École alsacienne. In 1937 he began studying at the Lycée Saint-Louis. After passing a qualifying examination, he enrolled at Sorbonne University. There in 1941 he joined the French Communist Party and the Resistance. In 1943 his younger brother was taken in as a lodger by a farming family in Normandy. In 1944 J.-L. Steinberg graduated with a doctorate in engineering from the ENS Paris college of Sorbonne University. In June 1944, he, his parents, and his older brother were all rounded up because of their Jewish ethnicity. On July 4th, the family arrived in Auschwitz-Birkenau. Of the 4 family members, J.-L. Steinberg was the only survivor seven months later. J.-L. Steinberg's younger brother was never deported to a concentration camp and also survived. J.-L. Steinberg married Madeleine White in 1946. They adopted his younger brother and had a son, Alain, in 1948.

At his return in France in 1945, Steinberg, working with Jean-François Denisse under the influence of Yves Rocard, developed radio astronomy in France. Steinberg and Denisse were the co-founders in 1953 of the Paris Observatory's radio astronomy station in Nançay. Steinberg played a major part in the construction of the large decimeter radio telescope, which was officially inaugurated in May 1965 by Charles de Gaulle but became fully operational only in 1967.

In 1963 Steinberg founded in 1963 the Paris Observatory's Service d’Astronomie Spatiale (service of space astronomy) in Meudon. The service launched, in 1965 and 1967, two French Rubis rockets with low-frequency receivers and with deployment of very long dipole antennas for detection in space of radio waves with frequency less than 3 MHz. He was the originator of the Stereo-1 experiment on board the Soviet Mars 3 mission launched in 1971. The experiment successfully showed for the first time the directivity of solar radio bursts of Types I and III. A similar experiment for detection at lower frequencies was launched in 1973 on board the Soviet Mars 7 mission.

From 1962 to 1969, J.-L. Steinberg was the editor-in-chief of the journal Annales d’Astrophysique. His editorial work was assisted by his wife Madeleine, who spoke English and Russian fluently. In April 1968 astronomers and astrophysicists from several European countries agreed to merge their various astronomical and astrophysical journals into a single European astronomical journal. J.-L. Steinberg, Jean-François Denisse, Jean-Claude Pecker, Jan Oort, Anders Reiz, and Stuart Pottasch played important roles in the founding of the journal. The first edition of the resulting journal, Astronomy & Astrophysics, was published in 1969 with Steinberg and Pottasch as the two co-editors-in-chief. The journal Astronomy and Astrophysics merged five scientific journals as of January 1969, with a sixth (the Swedish journal Arkiv för Astronomi) merged somewhat later. Steinberg was a co-editor-in-chief from 1969 to 1973, when he resigned in favor of Jean Heidmann (1923–2000).

Jean-Louis Steinberg wrote a 12-page, English-language autobiography, published in 2001, and coauthored several papers on French radio astronomy published in the Journal of Astronomical History and Heritage from 2007 to 2011.

In 1979 the Société Française de Physique (SFP) awarded him the Prix Félix-Robin. In November 2017 a workshop was held as a memorial to him, and, on the Paris Observatory's Meudon campus, a building was named after him. The asteroid 13499 Steinberg is named in his honour.

== Selected publications ==
=== Articles ===
- Blum, E.; Denisse, J.; Steinberg, J. (1958). "Radio Astronomy at the Meudon Observatory". Proceedings of the IRE. 46: 39–43. doi:10.1109/JRPROC.1958.286708. S2CID 51638674.
- Tanaka, H.; Steinberg, J. -L. (1964). "The bipolar structure of the polarized radio sources above a bipolar sunspot". Annales d'Astrophysique. 27: 29. Bibcode:1964AnAp...27...29T.
- Steinberg, J. L.; Aubier-Giraud, M.; Leblanc, Y.; Boischot, A. (1971). "Coronal Scattering, Absorption and Refraction of Solar Radiobursts". Astronomy and Astrophysics. 10: 362. Bibcode:1971A&A....10..362S.
- Cane, H. V.; Stone, R. G.; Fainberg, J.; Steinberg, J. L.; Hoang, S. (1982). "Type II solar radio events observed in the interplanetary medium". Solar Physics. 78: 187–198. doi:10.1007/BF00151153. S2CID 119963017.
- Steinberg, J. L.; Hoang, S.; Lecacheux, A.; Aubier, M. G.; Dulk, G. A. (1984). "Type III radio bursts in the interplanetary medium - the role of propagation". Astronomy and Astrophysics. 140 (1): 39. Bibcode:1984A&A...140...39S.
- Dulk, G. A.; Goldman, M. V.; Steinberg, J. L.; Hoang, S. (1987). "The speeds of electrons that excite solar radio bursts of type III". Astronomy and Astrophysics. 173 (2): 366. Bibcode:1987A&A...173..366D.
- Lecacheux, A.; Steinberg, J. -L.; Hoang, S.; Dulk, G. A. (1989). "Characteristics of type III bursts in the solar wind from simultaneous observations on board ISEE-3 and Voyager". Astronomy and Astrophysics. 217 (1–2): 237. Bibcode:1989A&A...217..237L.
- Orchiston, Wayne; Steinberg, Jean-Louis (March 2007). "Highlighting the history of French radio astronomy. 2: The solar eclipse observations of 1949-1954". Journal of Astronomical History and Heritage. 10: 11–19. doi:10.3724/SP.J.1440-2807.2007.01.02. S2CID 53595342.
- Orchiston, Wayne; Lequeux, James; Steinberg, Jean-Louis; Delannoy, Jean (2007). "Highlighting the history of French radio astronomy. 3: The Würzburg antennas at Marcoussis, Meudon and Nançay". Journal of Astronomical History and Heritage. 10 (3): 221. Bibcode:2007JAHH...10..221O. doi:10.3724/SP.J.1440-2807.2007.03.12. S2CID 129489453.
- Orchiston, Wayne; Steinberg, Jean-Louis; Kundu, Mukul; Arsac, Jacques; Blum, Emile-Jacques; Boischot, Andre (2009). "Highlighting the History of French Radio Astronomy. 4. Early Solar Research at the École Normale Supérieure, Marcoussis and Nançay". Journal of Astronomical History and Heritage. 12: 175–188. doi:10.3724/SP.J.1440-2807.2009.03.01. S2CID 118773903.
- Lequeux, James; Steinberg, Jean-Louis; Orchiston, Wayne (2010). "Highlighting the history of French Radio Astronomy. 5: The Nançay Large Radio Telescope". Journal of Astronomical History and Heritage. 13 (1): 29. Bibcode:2010JAHH...13...29L. doi:10.3724/SP.J.1440-2807.2010.01.03. S2CID 115302895.
- Pick, Monique; Steinberg, Jean-Louis; Orchiston, Wayne; Boischot, Andre (2011). "Highlighting the History of French Radio Astronomy. 6: The Multi-element Grating Arrays". Journal of Astronomical History and Heritage. 14 (1): 57. Bibcode:2011JAHH...14...57P. doi:10.3724/SP.J.1440-2807.2011.01.05. S2CID 124632268.

=== Books ===
- Steinberg, Jean-Louis; Lequeux, James (1960). Radioastronomie: Les méthodes radioélectriques au service de l'Astrophysique. Paris: Dunod. LCCN 73002837.
  - Steinberg, Jean-Louis; Lequeux, James (1963). Radio astronomy. McGraw-Hill. Bibcode:1963raas.book.....S. LCCN 62021905; translated by Ronald N. Bracewell
- Steinberg, J.-L., ed. (1965). Astronomical observations from space vehicles. Symposium no. 23 held in Liège, Belgium, 17 to 20 August 1964, under the joint sponsorship of the IAU and COSPAR. Lille: Printed for the International Committee of Scientific Unions by Impr. Taffin-Lefort. LCCN 73002837.
- Steinberg, J.-L. (2012). Vivre d'Amour et de Mémoire. Éditions La Bruyère. ISBN 978-2750007959.
