= Jean Cabannes =

French physicist (1885–1959)

- Born: 12 August 1885; Marseille, France
- Died: 31 October 1959 (aged 74); Saint-Cyr-sur-Mer, France
- Education: École Normale Supérieure; Aix-Marseille University
- Awards: Prix Félix-Robin; Prix des Trois Physiciens
- Scientific career
- Institutions: University of Montpellier; University of Paris
- Doctoral advisor: Charles Fabry
- Doctoral students: Jean Dufay

Jean Cabannes (French pronunciation: [ʒɑ̃ kaban]; 12 August 1885 – 31 October 1959) was a French physicist specialising in optics.

== Education and career ==
Cabannes studied at the Lycée de Nice and entered the École Normale Supérieure in 1906. From 1910 to 1914, Cabannes worked in the laboratory of Charles Fabry at Aix-Marseille University on the topic launched by Lord Rayleigh at the end of the 19th century of how gas molecules diffused light. In 1914, he showed that pure gases could scatter light. This was published in Comptes Rendus in 1915. His career was then interrupted for five years by World War I.

In 1919, Cabannes returned to Fabry's laboratory to complete his thesis, after which he moved to University of Montpellier, and later on to University of Paris. In 1925 he and Jean Dufay calculated the height of the ozone layer. Cabannes along with Pierre Daure and Yves Rocard were among the scientists who, in 1928, discovered that gases diffusing monochromatic light could also change their wavelength (the Cabannes-Daure effect).

This was identified independently by C. V. Raman and K. S. Krishnan in liquids, and by G. S. Landsberg and L. I. Mandelstam in crystals. Cabannes was among the candidates for the Nobel Prize in Physics of 1929 (proposed by Charles Fabry), which was awarded to de Broglie and the 1930 prize went to C. V. Raman.

== Honors and awards ==
In 1949, he was elected a member of l'Académie des Sciences. In 1924, he received the Prix Félix-Robin and in 1951 the first ever awarded Prix des Trois Physiciens from the Fondation de France.

Cabannes was the President of the Société astronomique de France (SAF) (French astronomical society), from 1951 to 1953.

The lunar crater Cabannes was named after him in 1970.

== Personal life ==
He was married to a daughter of Eugène Fabry (1856–1944), brother of Charles Fabry, and was the father of four children, among whom was the mathematician Henri Cabannes.
