= Tour de Cargèse =

Genoese coastal defence tower in Corsica

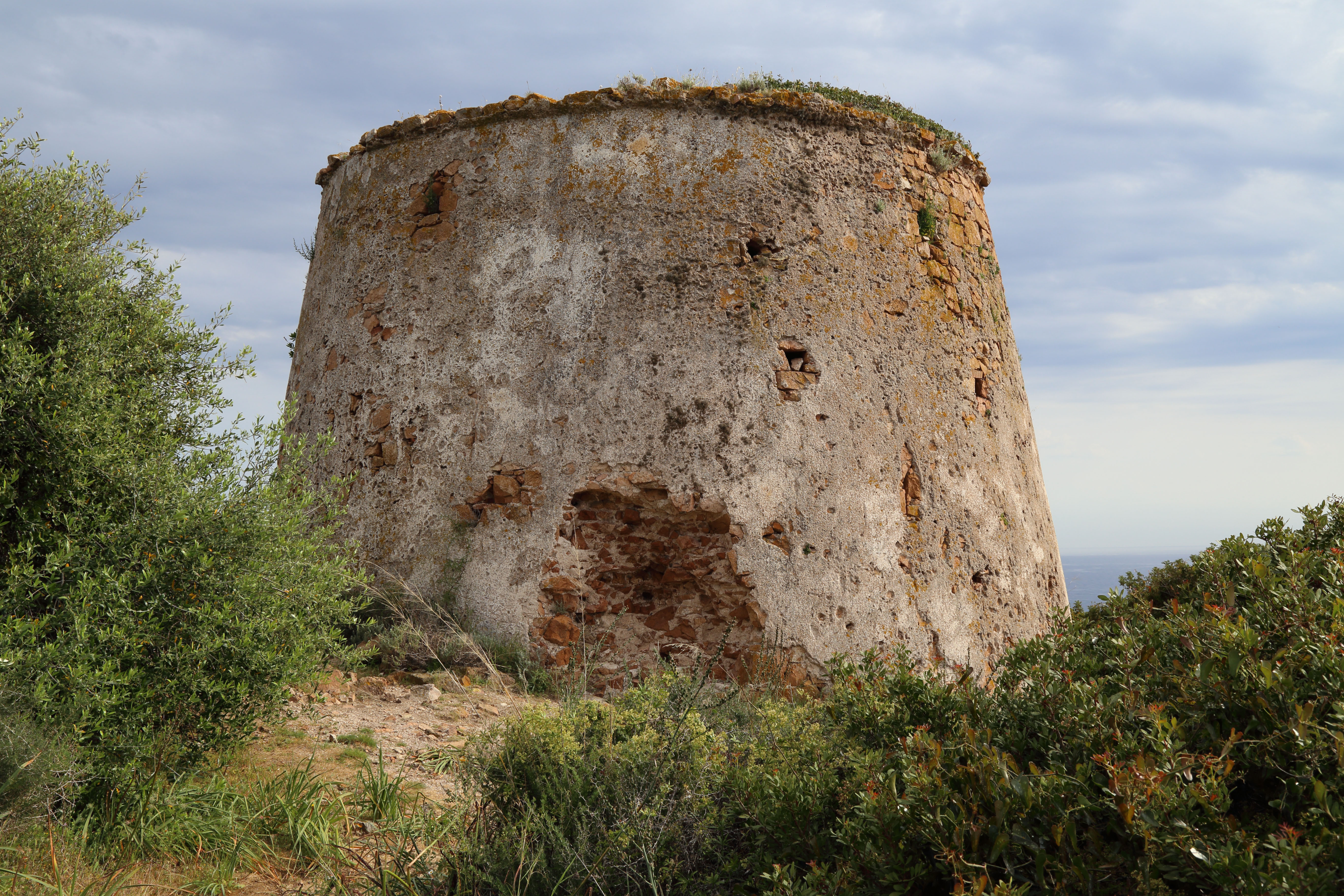

- Location within Corsica
- 42°7′59″N 8°35′22″E

History
- Built: 1605–1606

Site notes
- Architect: Giacomo della Piana

The Tour de Cargèse (Corsican: Torra di Carghjese) is a ruined Genoese tower located in the commune of Cargèse on the French island of Corsica. It sits on the highest point of the Puntiglione headland at an elevation of 157 metres (515 ft) above the sea. Only the base of the tower has survived.

The Tour de Cargèse was built between 1605 and 1606 under the direction of Giacomo della Piana. It was one of a series of coastal defences constructed by the Republic of Genoa between 1530 and 1620 to stem the attacks by Barbary pirates.

Parts of the Puntiglione headland and the adjacent coastline covering an area of 174 hectares (430 acres) are owned by the Conservatoire du littoral, an agency of the French state.

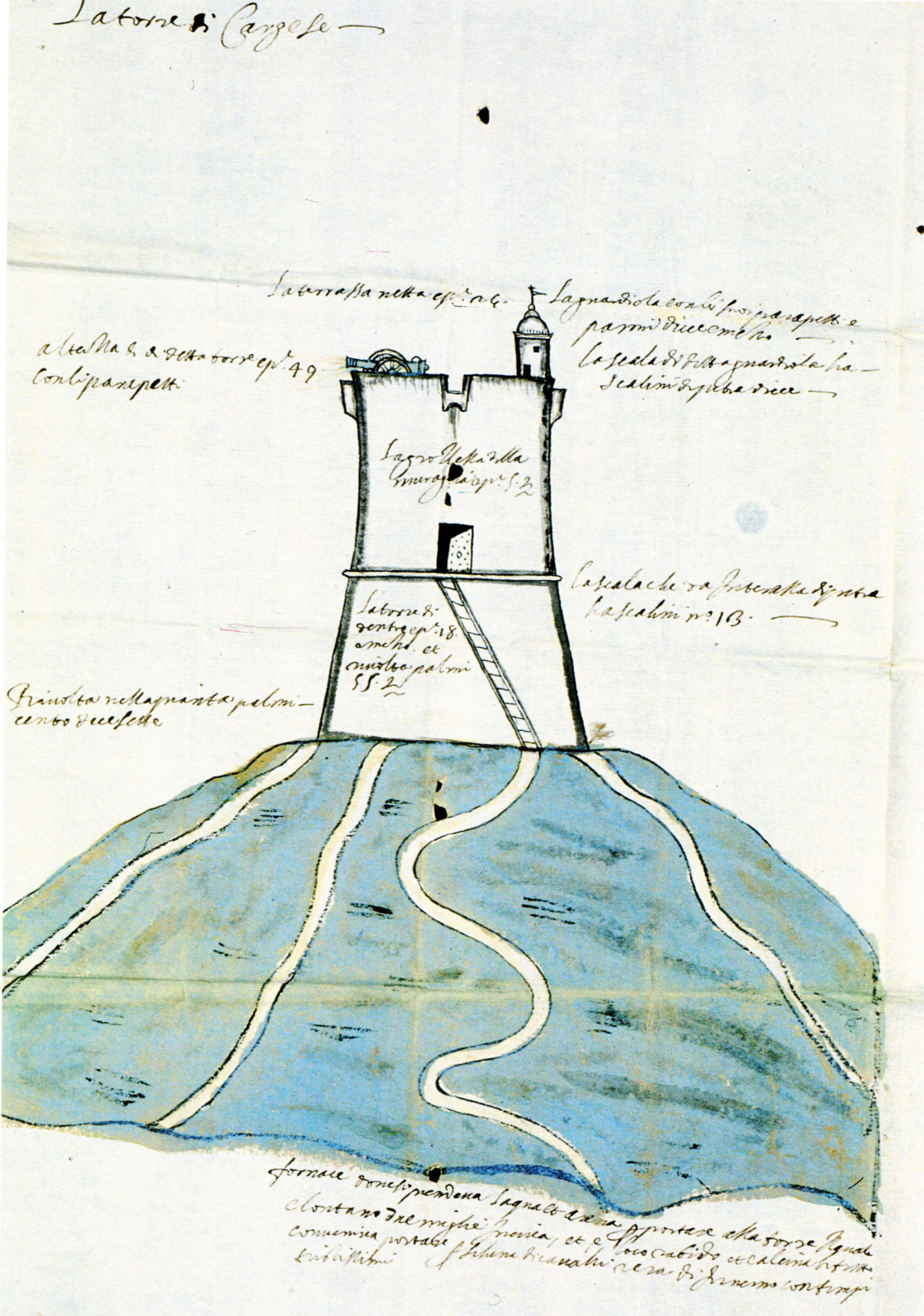
Drawing from the Genoese archives showing the tower immediately after construction.

== See also ==
- List of Genoese towers in Corsica
