= Anne-Marie Levelut =

French physicist

Anne-Marie Levelut (c. 1937 – September 2023) was a French condensed matter physicist known for her pioneering use of low-angle X-ray diffraction to study soft matter, and for her research connecting the molecular structure of liquid crystals with their phases.

== Education and career ==
Levelut is an alumna of ESPCI Paris. She became a researcher for the French National Centre for Scientific Research (CNRS) in 1961, working under the direction of André Guinier in the Laboratoire de Physique des Solides, a joint research center of CNRS and the Orsay campus of the University of Paris (now Paris-Saclay University). Through this work she received a doctorat d'état through the University of Paris, with a 1968 thesis. After becoming a director of research for the CNRS, she retired in 2001.

== Research ==
Levelut's initial research, in the 1960s, involved low-angle X-ray diffraction studies of crystallographic defects. In the 1970s her interests shifted, under the influence of Pierre-Gilles de Gennes, to soft matter and liquid crystals. Through her use of X-ray diffraction and inelastic neutron scattering, she became the first to characterize and investigate the dynamics of smectic phases of liquid crystals. In the 1980s her main focuses became the connection between the molecular structure and phase structure of liquid crystals, and the extension of this work to liquid crystal phases of biomolecules including DNA. In the 1990s, additional topics became prominent in her research: the crystalline structure of certain physical interfaces between different materials, and the use of anomalous X-ray scattering at the National Synchrotron Light Source of the Brookhaven National Laboratory in the US to elucidate liquid crystal structures.

After retiring, Levelut coauthored a book, La diffraction des rayons X par les cristaux liquides (with Patrick Davidson and Alan Braslau, EDP Sciences, 2023).

== Recognition ==
Levelut was the 1998 recipient of the Prix Félix-Robin of the Société Française de Physique.
