= Magali Deleuil =

French astrophysicist

Magali A.-M. Deleuil is a French astrophysicist. She is a professor (exceptional class) at Aix-Marseille University, and a researcher in the Laboratoire d'astrophysique de Marseille (LAM).

== Research ==
After training in plasma and radiation, and initial research on stellar atmospheres in late stages of stellar evolution, Deleuil's interests turned to circumstellar discs and their role in the formation of stars and planetary systems, and from there to the discovery of exoplanets, and the use of stellar properties in determining the characteristics of exoplanets.

She was scientific lead for the CoRoT space telescope, French lead for the CHEOPS space telescope, and is a member of the scientific advisory committee for the PLATO space telescope.

Her discoveries include the first application of the transit method to detect an exoplanet, CoRoT-7b, which was the first potential extrasolar terrestrial planet to be found. She led a team whose discovery of CoRoT-3b, a body intermediate between a gas giant exoplanet or brown dwarf failed star, called into question the classification of exoplanets.

== Education ==
Deleuil received her Ph.D. from the University of Provence (Aix-Marseille I) in 1991. Her thesis, Etudes spectroscopiques d'objets stellaires présentant un fort excès de rayonnement dans l'ultraviolet (Spectroscopic studies of stellar objects with strong ultraviolet excess) was directed by Vincent-Paul Kaftandjian.

== Recognition ==
Deleuil was named as a senior member of the Institut Universitaire de France in the 2009 and 2016 five-year cohorts. She was the 2023 recipient of the CNES Astrophysics & Space Sciences award of the Institut de France, and the 2025 recipient of the Prix Félix-Robin of the Société Française de Physique.
