= Marianne Lambert =

French crystallographer

Marianne Lambert is a French crystallographer, and a past president of the Société Française de Physique.

== Education and career ==
Lambert sustained her doctorate at the University of Paris in 1958, and published her thesis, Etude des imperfections de structure du fluorure de lithium irradié (neutrons thermiques), in 1959.

In the late 1960s she was a maître de conférences in the Paris-Saclay Faculty of Sciences. In the late 1970s, she and Daniel Cribier became founding co-directors of the Orphée nuclear reactor of CEA Paris-Saclay. By 2003 she was listed as an honorary professor of Paris-Sud University.

She was president of the Société Française de Physique for the 1995–1996 term.

== Recognition ==
She received the CNRS Silver Medal in 1968, In 1981, she received the Prix Félix-Robin of the Société Française de Physique, for her work on defects in ionic crystals, diffuse X-ray scattering, and liquid crystals.
