= Torra d'Omigna =

Genoese tower in Corsica

Tower of Omigna
- Torra d'Omigna (Corsican)
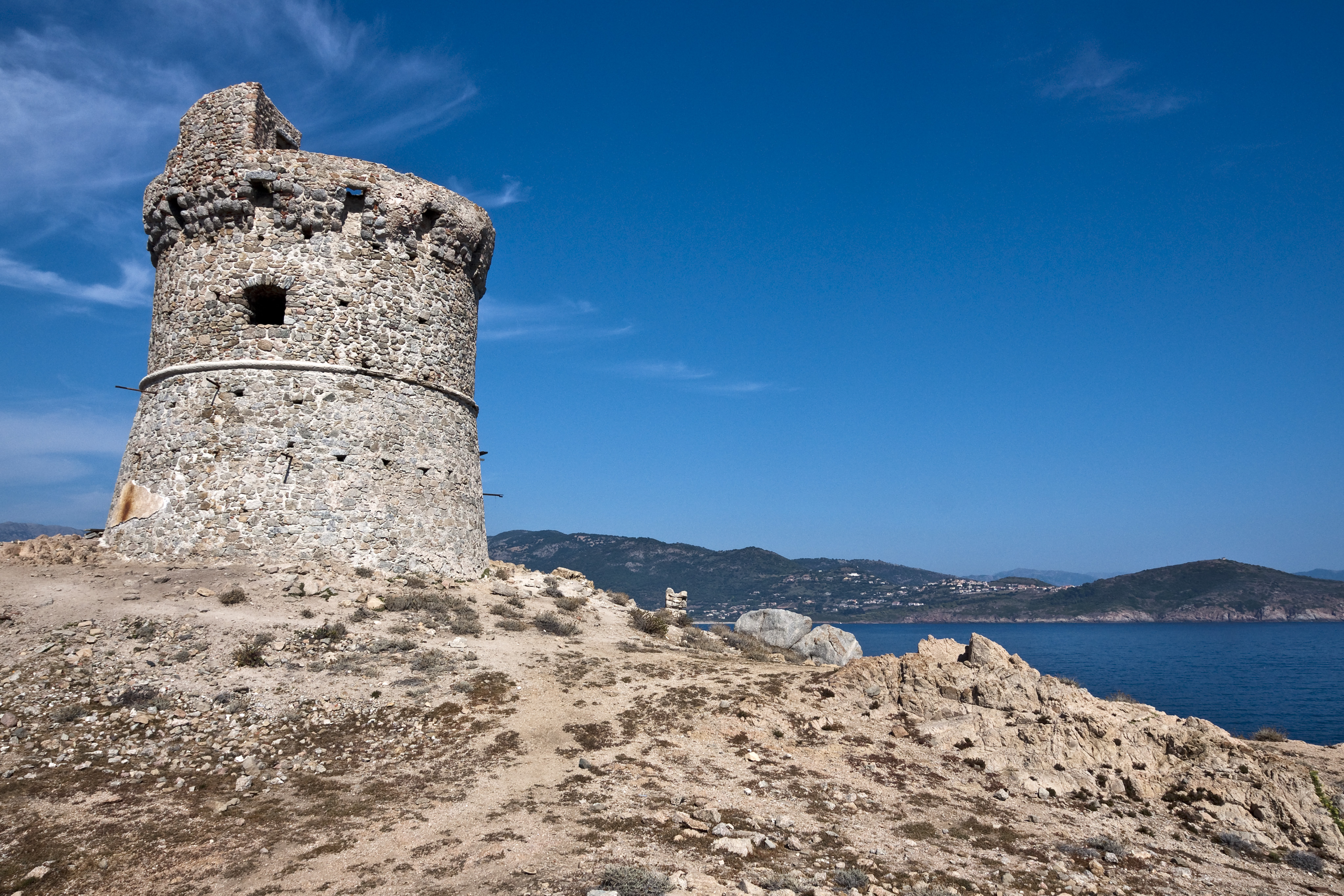

- Location within Corsica
- 42°8′47″N 8°33′36″E

History
- Built: 1605–1606

Site notes
- Architect: Giacomo della Piana
- Restored: 2009

Monument historique
- Designated: 8 March 1991
- Reference no.: PA00099136

The Tower of Omigna (Corsican: torra d'Omigna, French: tour d'Omigna) is a ruined Genoese tower located in the commune of Cargèse on the French island of Corsica.

The tower was built between 1605 and 1606 under the direction of Giacomo della Piana. It was one of a series of coastal defences built by the Republic of Genoa between 1530 and 1620 to stem the attacks by Barbary pirates. In 1991 it was listed as one of the official Historical Monuments of France.

Since 1977 the tower has been owned by a French government agency, the Conservatoire du littoral. The agency has announced that it plans to purchase 212 hectares (520 acres) of the headland and as of 2011 had acquired 121 hectares (300 acres). The tower was restored in 2009 and visitors can climb up onto the roof terrace.

An area of 255 hectares (630 acres) that includes the headland and portions of the adjacent coastline is owned by an agency of the French state, the Conservatoire du littoral.

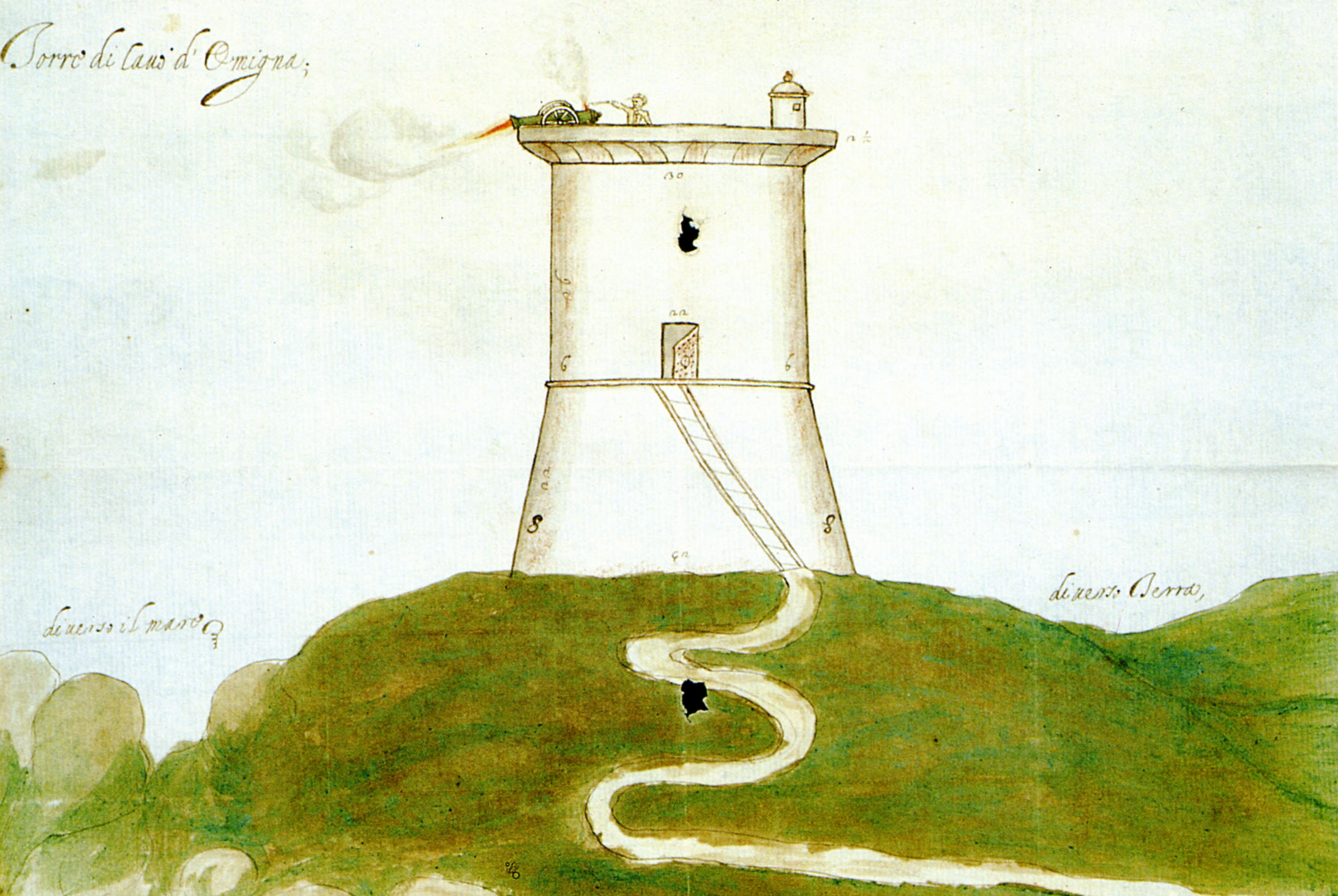
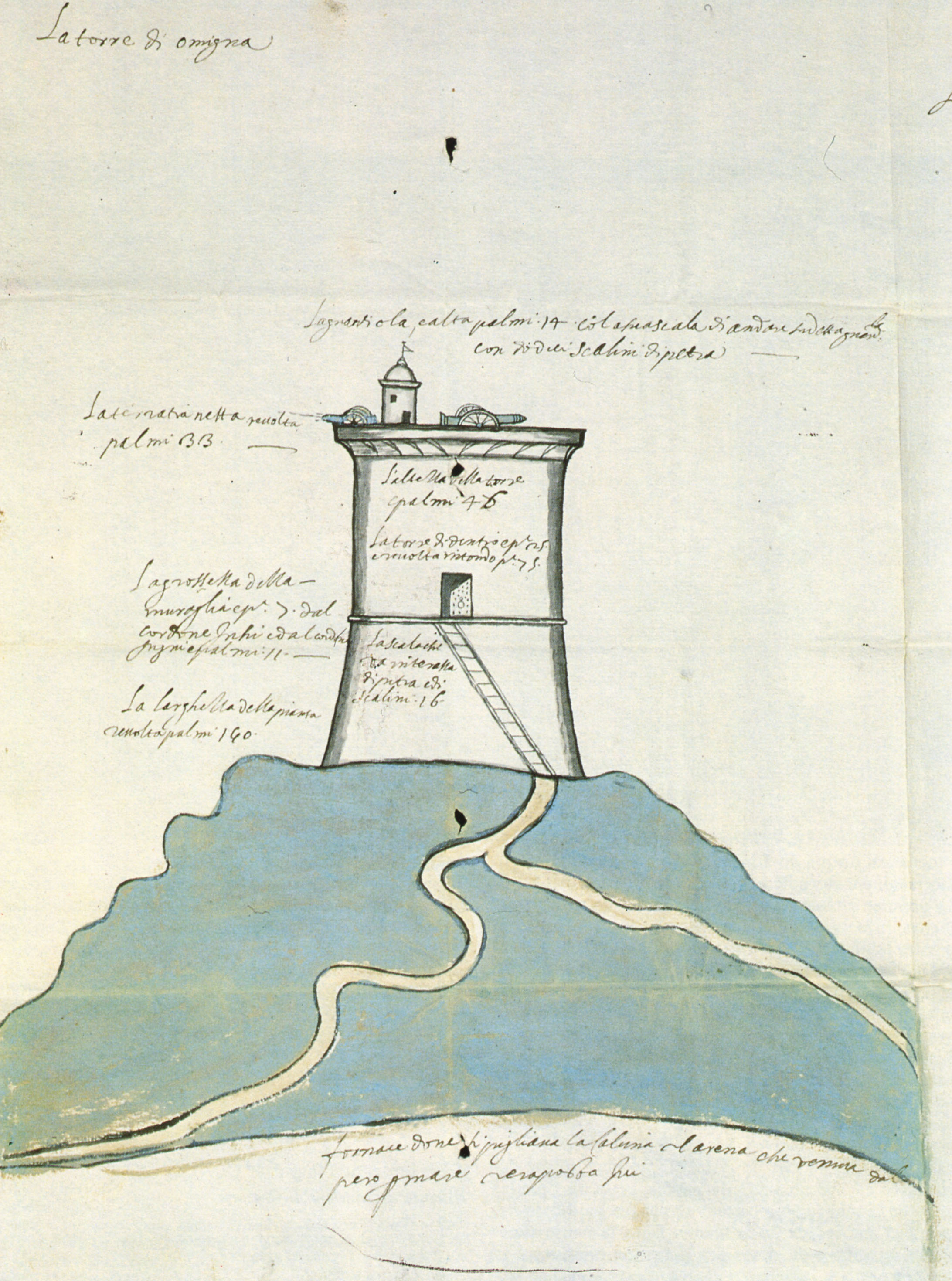
Drawings from the Genoese archives dating from the time of the tower's construction.

== The 1729 siege of the Tower of Omigna ==
In 1729, the Greek inhabitants of Paomia, pursued by the Corsicans of Vico and Niolo who wished to drive them from their lands, took refuge in the Tower of Omigna. Boats from Ajaccio came to recover the women and children to transport them by sea to Ajaccio, while the men resisted to the siege. Once the women and children were safe, the men left the tower, crossed the enemy lines and were able to reach Ajaccio by land.

== See also ==
- List of Genoese towers in Corsica
