= Loup Verlet =

French computational physicist (1931–2019)

- Born: Jean-Loup Gaston Emmanuel Verlet; May 24, 1931; Paris, France
- Died: June 13, 2019 (aged 88); Gometz-le-Châtel, France
- Education: University of Paris
- Known for: Verlet integration Verlet list
- Scientific career
- Thesis: Contribution à l'étude du modèle optique du noyau (1957)
- Doctoral advisor: Maurice Lévy
- Doctoral students: Jean-Pierre Hansen

Loup Verlet (French pronunciation: [lu vɛʁˈlɛ]; 24 May 1931 – 13 June 2019) was a French computational physicist who pioneered the computer simulation of molecular dynamics models. In a famous 1967 paper he used what is now known as Verlet integration (a method for the numerical integration of equations of motion) and the Verlet list (a data structure that keeps track of each molecule's immediate neighbors in order to speed computer calculations of molecule-to-molecule interactions).

== Education and career ==
Verlet received his PhD in 1957; his PhD work was initially conducted in the group of Victor Weisskopf at the Massachusetts Institute of Technology and concluded under the guidance of Maurice Lévy at the École normale supérieure in Paris. From 1957 to 1993 he worked mostly on the physics of the liquid state.

He also wrote about the history of science. In his book "La Malle de Newton" (1993) he argued that Isaac Newton was an important transition figure between the medieval, mainly religious, world of ideas and the modern scientific way of analyzing physical problems. Newton had a foot in both worlds, as shown by the fact that his writings are not only concerned with mathematics and physics, but also theology and alchemy, a combination that might seem bizarre by modern standards. The publication of Newton's Principia in 1687 and the Glorious Revolution of 1688 (with the king's powers limited by an elected Parliament) were the key events that brought the old era to a close and ushered in the modern one.

His last book was 'Chimères et Paradoxes' (Ed. Cerf, 2007), an extended essay that touches on the philosophy of science as well as the history of science. Among other things, it considers how three great thinkers (Descartes, Newton and Freud) changed our world view.

== Bibliography ==
=== Books ===
- Verlet, Loup (1961). Mécanique statistique (in French). Office national des universités et écoles françaises.
- Verlet, Loup (1993). La malle de Newton. Bibliothèque des sciences humaines (in French). Paris: Gallimard. ISBN 978-2-07-073058-2.
- Verlet, Loup (2007). Chimères et paradoxes: comment penser le monde où nous vivons?. Passages (in French). Paris: Éditions du Cerf. ISBN 978-2-204-08207-5.

=== Selected publications ===
- Verlet, Loup (1967). "Computer "Experiments" on Classical Fluids. I. Thermodynamical Properties of Lennard-Jones Molecules". Physical Review. 159 (1): 98–103. doi:10.1103/PhysRev.159.98. ISSN 0031-899X.
- Verlet, Loup (1968). "Computer "Experiments" on Classical Fluids. II. Equilibrium Correlation Functions". Physical Review. 165 (1): 201–214. doi:10.1103/PhysRev.165.201. ISSN 0031-899X.
- Levesque, Dominique; Verlet, Loup (1970). "Computer "Experiments" on Classical Fluids. III. Time-Dependent Self-Correlation Functions". Physical Review A. 2 (6): 2514–2528. doi:10.1103/PhysRevA.2.2514. ISSN 0556-2791.
- Levesque, D.; Verlet, L.; Kürkijarvi, Juhani (1973). "Computer "Experiments" on Classical Fluids. IV. Transport Properties and Time-Correlation Functions of the Lennard-Jones Liquid near Its Triple Point". Physical Review A. 7 (5): 1690–1700. doi:10.1103/PhysRevA.7.1690. ISSN 0556-2791.
- Hansen, Jean-Pierre; Verlet, Loup (1969). "Phase Transitions of the Lennard-Jones System". Physical Review. 184 (1): 151–161. doi:10.1103/PhysRev.184.151. ISSN 0031-899X.
- Verlet, Loup; Weis, Jean-Jacques (1972). "Equilibrium Theory of Simple Liquids". Physical Review A. 5 (2): 939–952. doi:10.1103/PhysRevA.5.939. ISSN 0556-2791.
- Levesque, D.; Verlet, L. (1993). "Molecular dynamics and time reversibility". Journal of Statistical Physics. 72 (3–4): 519–537. doi:10.1007/BF01048022. ISSN 0022-4715..
