= Stephen Wilson (historian) =

English historian (born 1941)

Stephen Wilson (born 1941) is an English historian. He was Reader in European History at the University of East Anglia, Norwich. His 1995 book Feuding, Conflict and Banditry in Nineteenth-Century Corsica was awarded the Prix du Livre Corse in 1996.

Wilson earned his doctorate from the University of Cambridge in 1967 for his thesis The Historians of the Action Française". He authored articles in history, historiography and religion.

== Books ==
- (with B.C. Southam) The Magical Universe: Everyday Ritual and Magic in Pre-Modern Europe, First edition: Hambledon and London, 2000, ISBN 1852852518
- The Means Of Naming: A Social and Cultural History of Naming in Western Europe First edition: 1998, ISBN 1857282450 - The book gives a background of European naming, with major attention to pre-1500s period.
- Feuding, Conflict and Banditry in Nineteenth-Century Corsica, Cambridge University Press, 2003, ISBN 0521522641
  - (French language) Vendetta et banditisme en Corse au dix-neuvième siècle, 1995, 2002
- Ideology and Experience: Antisemitism in France at the Time of the Dreyfus Affair, 2007, ISBN 1904113591 (first edition: 1982 by Rutherford, London and Toronto)—The 1982 book was influential for the recognition of the effect of the undercurrent of antisemitism in French society on the Dreyfus Affair among the historians.
