= Liliane Léger =

French physicist

Liliane Léger-Quercy
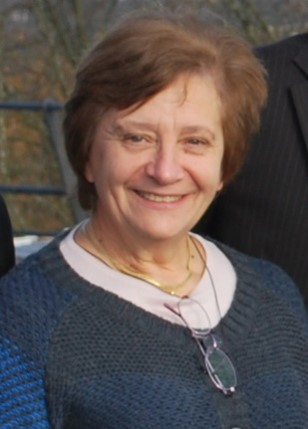
- Born: August 24, 1944 (age 82); Charenton-le-Pont
- Education: Université Paris-Sud
- Scientific career
- Thesis: Étude expérimentale des propriétés élastiques et dynamiques de certaines phases mésomorphes

Liliane Léger née Quercy (French pronunciation: [liljan leʒe]; born August 22, 1944) is a French physicist. Her research considers polymers and the molecular mechanisms of adhesion. She was awarded the Groupe Français d’Études et d’Applications des Polymères Prix d’Honneur in 2021.

== Early life and education ==
Léger was born in Charenton-le-Pont. She was a student at Lycée Pasteur. After completing high school, Leger joined the University of Paris, where she worked toward a bachelor's degree in Atomic and Molecular Physics. She moved to the Laboratoire de Physique des Solides in 1967, where she was trained in solid state physics. She remained in Orsay for her doctoral research, working in the laboratory of Georges Durand and Madeleine Veyssié. Her doctoral research considered the thermal fluctuations of nematic liquid crystals. She defended her thesis on the elastic and dynamic properties of mesomorphic phases under the supervision of P.-G. de Gennes in 1975.

== Research and career ==
Léger joined the polymer group at the Collège de France in 1977 and was appointed head of group just over ten years later. In 1985, she became head of the Polymers team at the Collège de France. She was appointed professor at the University of Paris-Sud in 1988. She returned to the Laboratoire de Physique des Solides Adhesion, Friction and Polymer group. She was made an emeritus professor in 2009.

In 2016 the French National Centre for Scientific Research held a conference in Léger's honour.

== Awards and honours ==
- 1990 Senior member of the Institut Universitaire de France
- 2004 French Physical Society Prix Félix Robin
- 2005 Elected to the Legion of Honour
- 2015 Elected Fellow of the American Physical Society
- 2021 Groupe Français d’Études et d’Applications des Polymères Prix d’Honneur

== Selected publications ==
- Pit R; Hervet H; Leger L (1 July 2000). "Direct experimental evidence of slip in hexadecane: solid interfaces". Physical Review Letters. 85 (5): 980–983. doi:10.1103/physrevlett.85.980. ISSN 0031-9007. PMID 10991454. Wikidata Q74325087.
- Kalman B Migler; Hervet H; Leger L (1 January 1993). "Slip transition of a polymer melt under shear stress". Physical Review Letters. 70 (3): 287–290. doi:10.1103/physrevlett.70.287. ISSN 0031-9007. PMID 10054074. Wikidata Q74536858.
- Auroy P; Auvray L; Léger L (1 February 1991). "Characterization of the brush regime for grafted polymer layers at the solid-liquid interface". Physical Review Letters. 66 (6): 719–722. doi:10.1103/physrevlett.66.719. ISSN 0031-9007. PMID 10043883. Wikidata Q74508618.
