= Cargèse =

Commune in Corsica, France

Cargèse Carghjese (Corsican)
- Commune
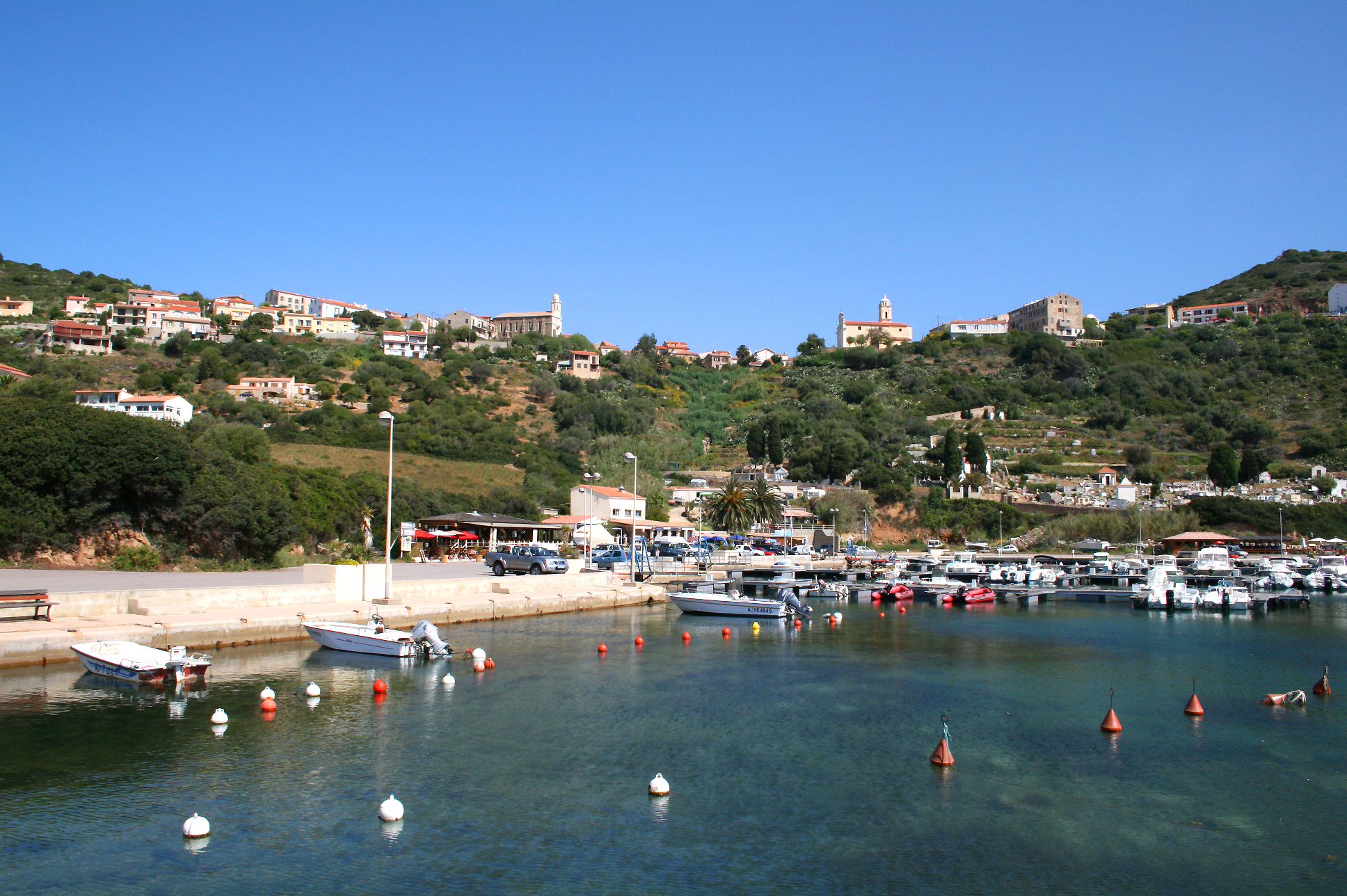
- The village and the harbour

- Flag Coat of arms
- Location of Cargèse
- Location within France Location within Corsica
- Coordinates: 42°08′10″N 8°35′42″E
- Country: France
- Region: Corsica
- Department: Corse-du-Sud
- Arrondissement: Ajaccio
- Canton: Sevi-Sorru-Cinarca

Government
  - Mayor (2020–2026): François Garidacci
- Area^{1}: 45.99 km^{2} (17.76 sq mi)
- Elevation: 60 m (200 ft)
- Highest elevation: 705 m (2,313 ft)
- Lowest elevation: 0 m (0 ft)
- Population (2023): 1,150
  - Density: 25.0/km^{2} (64.8/sq mi)
- Time zone: UTC+01:00 (CET)
  - Summer (DST): UTC+02:00 (CEST)
- INSEE/Postal code: 2A065 /20130
- ^{1} French Land Register data, which excludes lakes, ponds, glaciers > 1 km^{2} (0.386 sq mi or 247 acres) and river estuaries.

Cargèse (French: [kaʁʒɛz]; Corsican: Carghjese [karˈɟɛzɛ] or Carghjesi [karˈɟɛzi]; Italian: Cargese [karˈdʒeːze, eːse]; Greek: Καργκέζε, romanized: Kargkéze) is a village and commune in the Corse-du-Sud department of France on the west coast of the island of Corsica, 27 km north of Ajaccio.

The village was established at the end of the 18th century by the descendants of a group of immigrants from the Mani Peninsula of the Greek Peloponnese who had first settled in Corsica a hundred years earlier. The economy of the village is now based around tourism. Cargèse is noted for having two 19th-century churches that face one another across a small valley overlooking the harbour and the sea. One was built by the descendants of the Greek immigrants and the other by native Corsicans.

== History ==
=== Paomia 1676 to 1731 ===
In the second half of the 17th century there was a substantial emigration from the Mani Peninsula of the Greek Peloponnese. This was mainly driven by the wish to escape from the control of the Ottoman Turks but was also prompted by the lack of arable land and by the intense feuding between different clans.

In 1669 the Ottomans captured Crete, and then a year later in 1670, as part of a strategy to strengthen their control over the Inner Mani, they built the fortress of Kelefa on the west side of the Mani peninsula. (Note: In 1684, only 9 years after the departure of the colonists from Oitylo, the Venetian Republic regained control of the Mani in the Morean War of 1684-1699. However their presence was short-lived and the Ottomans recaptured the area in 1715.) A number of the inhabitants of the small town of Oitylo (or Vitylo), which lay just 1.5 km west of the fortress, wished to emigrate to avoid the taxation imposed by the Ottomans and negotiated with the Republic of Genoa, which then controlled Corsica, for permission to settle on the island. The Republic offered them a choice of three locations in the Province of Vico and in October 1675 a group of 730 colonists departed from Oitylo and after a short stay in Genoa arrived in Corsica on 14 March 1676. They settled in Paomia, the site of several abandoned hamlets, (Note: In the 16th century many settlements near the coast of Corsica were abandoned because of the threat from Barbary pirates. In 1539 Paomia was attacked by a large force of pirates in seven galleys and fustas. They captured a tower and carried off the inhabitants who were hiding inside.) which is situated 4 km east of the present village of Cargèse at around 450 m in altitude on a hillside overlooking the Gulf of Sagone. The location has similarities to that of Oitylo which also overlooks the sea. The settlers agreed to pledge loyalty to Genoa and to recognise the spiritual authority of the Pope but were allowed to retain the Byzantine Rite as prescribed by the Holy See in Rome.

The colonists prospered and reestablished the five hamlets of Pancone, Corone, Rondolino, Salici and Monte-Rosso, all within a kilometre of one another. (Note: The 2004 IGN 1:25000 map marks Rondulinu, Pancone, Curona and "u conventu") They built (or restored) seven small churches in the different hamlets and a monastery lower down the hillside at Salici next to an abandoned church dedicated to Saint Martin. The main church in Rondolino was dedicated to Our Lady of the Assumption. The large number of churches is probably a reflection of the high proportion of clerics among the colonists. Of the 520 inhabitants listed in July 1676, there were 11 monks, 5 priests, several nuns and a bishop.

The local Corsicans resented the Greek colonists occupying land that they considered to be rightfully theirs and this led to disputes between the two communities. In 1715 an armed gang from Vico attacked the colonists but was eventually beaten off. In 1729, in the island-wide uprising of the Corsicans against the Genoese Republic, the Greeks remained loyal to the Genoese cause and as a result, their hamlets were repeatedly attacked. Finally in April 1731, 55 years after their arrival, the Greek colonists were forced to abandon Paomia and seek refuge in Ajaccio.

=== Ajaccio 1731 to 1775 ===
The 700 Greeks who took refuge in Ajaccio formed around 20% of the inhabitants of the town (3200 in 1731). They were offered the use of the church of La Madonna del Carmine which is still known as the Chapelle des Grecs. The Genoese employed 200 of the Greek men as guards to defend the town. The colonists were far less isolated than they had been in Paomia and there was some intermarriage and many of the men learnt to speak Corsican. Nevertheless, there was ongoing violence between the two communities and the Greeks found it expedient to abandon their traditional dress. The Genoese Republic had increasing financial problems and had difficulty maintaining law and order on the island. The Greek guards were no longer paid after 1744 and in 1752 the companies were disbanded. The lack of Genoese protection made life very difficult for the colonists, particularly after 1745, and a number of groups chose to emigrate to Sardinia, Menorca and Florida (New Smyrna). In 1746 about fifty Greek families residing in Cargèse emigrated to Montresta, Sardinia, where they obtained from Carlo Emanuele III territories in the area of the Villa of San Cristoforo di Montresta to establish their new settlement. Many of the inhabitants of the today Montresta are of Greek Maniot descent. The census of 1773 showed that the Greek population of the town had dropped to 428. The situation changed with the Treaty of Versaille in 1768 when the French gained control of the island and the governor, the Comte de Marbeuf, took a personal interest in the Greek colonists.

=== Cargèse 1775 to the present day ===
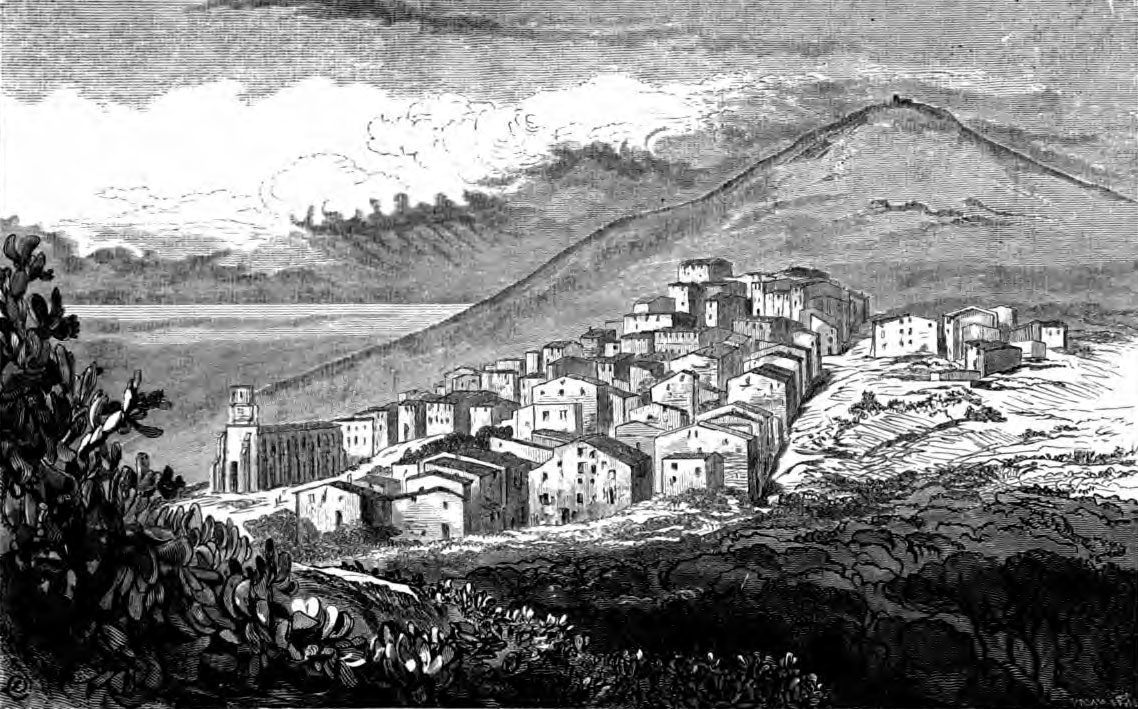
A view of Cargèse in 1868 from Edward Lear's Journal of a landscape painter in Corsica.

Marbeuf arranged for the construction of the village of Cargèse (Note: The origin of the toponym is unknown, but it certainly predates the arrival of the colonists in Corsica. It was also written as Calgese.) on the Puntiglione headland that separates the Gulf of Sagone from the smaller Gulf of Peru. Around 120 terraced houses were built, all paid for by the French crown. In 1775, under the leadership of George-Marie Stephanopoli, most of the Greek colonists moved from Ajaccio to the new village so that by 1784 there were 386 Greeks in Cargèse. Marbeuf had a large house with a garden built for himself on the west side of the village.

In 1789 and in 1791, with the breakdown in civil order resulting from the French Revolution, Cargèse was subject to a series of attacks by the inhabitants of the neighbouring villages. On each occasion the attackers were driven off but a number of families chose to return to Ajaccio to escape the violence. By 1792 24 families had moved back to Ajaccio, selling their properties in Cargèse to Corsicans. Thus, from early in its history there were both Greek and Corsican communities in the village.

Britain took control of Corsica in 1794 with Gilbert Elliot acting as viceroy during the short-lived Anglo-Corsican Kingdom. Elliot visited Cargèse in 1795 and recorded his experiences in his journal. At the time the village had population of around 500 people divided into 114 families. The British withdrew from the island in the October of the following year, and almost immediately the inhabitants of Vico, Appriciani, Balogna, Letia and Renno attacked Cargèse. Much of the village was destroyed including Marbeuf's own house. The inhabitants were forced to flee to Ajaccio where they stayed for three months before returning when French forces had reestablished order.

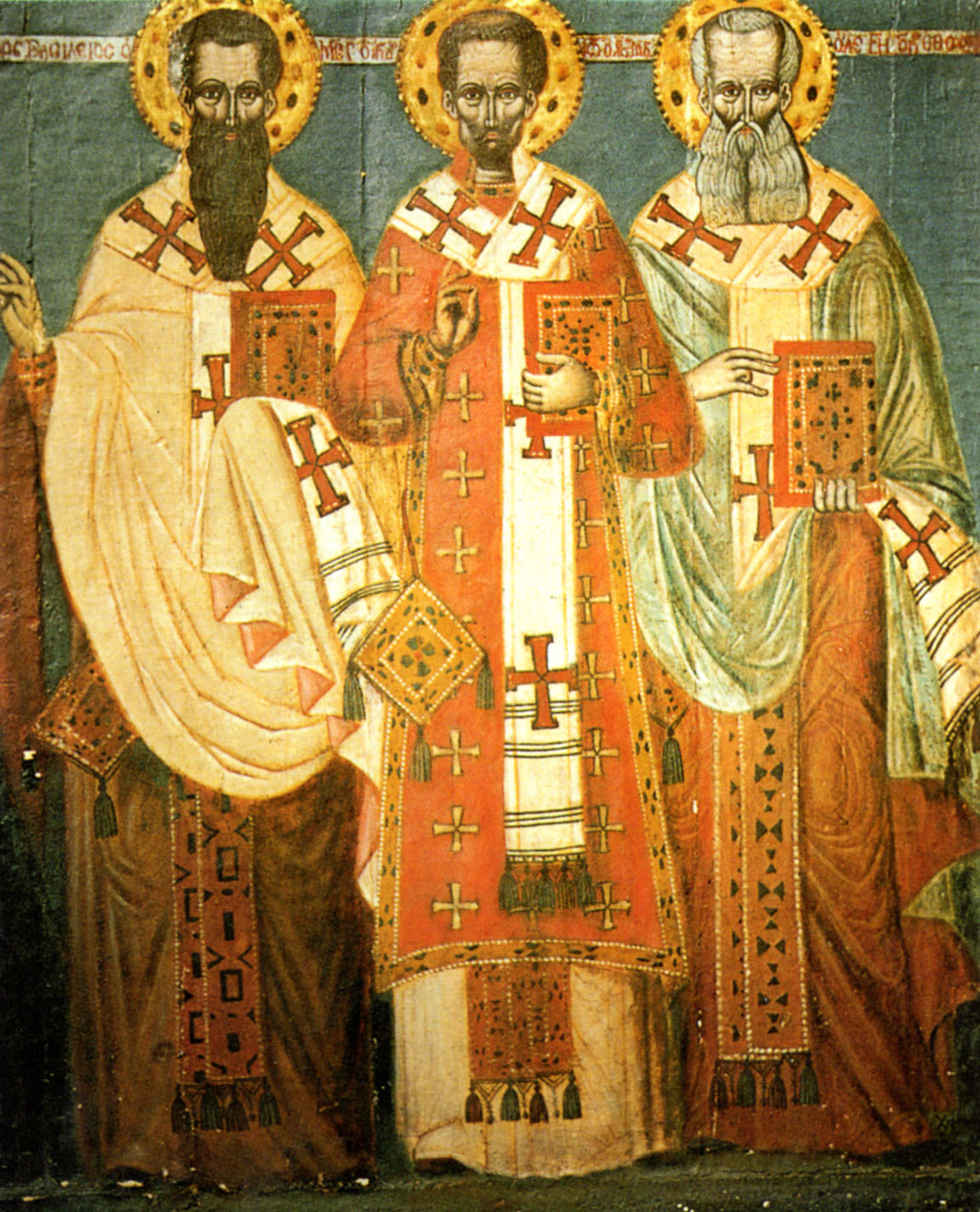
The Three Hierarchs, one of the paintings brought to Corsica by the Greek colonists in 1676.

The village was threatened on two further occasions. In 1814, with the collapse of the First French Empire, the threat of violence forced the inhabitants of Cargèse to surrender some of their farmland to the surrounding hamlets. The final incident occurred in 1830 at the time of the overthrow of Charles X and the Bourbon monarchy in the July Revolution. Neighbouring villagers again threatened to attack Cargèse but the arrival of a detachment of soldiers from Ajaccio prevented serious bloodshed.

A substantial proportion of the Greek speaking inhabitants of the village emigrated to Sidi Merouane in Algeria between 1874 and 1876. Of the total population of 1078 in 1872, it is estimated that 235 emigrated, all of them Greek speakers. The large drop in the Greek population was compensated by an influx of Corsicans making the remaining Greek speakers very much a minority.

In the 20th century the number of Greek speakers rapidly declined and by 1934 there were only 20 Greek speakers in the village. The last native speaker died in 1976, 300 years after the colonists had first arrived on the island. The historian Nick Nicholas has argued that the exceptionally long time that the colonists took to assimilate was a result of several factors including the substantial size of the colony, the large religious presence and the strong antagonism felt between the Corsicans and the settlers.

The census of 1896 recorded 1216 inhabitants but in the first half of the 20th century many young people left the village to find employment in continental France. By 1962 the population had dropped to 665. Since then the expansion of tourism has provided more employment and the population has increased reaching 1,150 in 2023.

The large scale emigration from rural communities was a general phenomenon for most of Corsica in the 20th century. For villages away from the coast that have not witnessed the development of tourism, the effects were severe. For example, Évisa (situated 21 km NE of Cargese as the crow flies) had a population of 1089 in 1886, 401 in 1962 and 196 in 1999.

== Population ==
Historical population

| Year | Pop. | ±% p.a. |
|---|---|---|
| 1800 | 527 | — |
| 1806 | 399 | −4.53% |
| 1821 | 645 | +3.25% |
| 1831 | 697 | +0.78% |
| 1836 | 806 | +2.95% |
| 1841 | 917 | +2.61% |
| 1846 | 999 | +1.73% |
| 1851 | 1,118 | +2.28% |
| 1861 | 1,063 | −0.50% |
| 1872 | 1,078 | +0.13% |
| 1896 | 1,216 | +0.50% |
| 1901 | 1,138 | −1.32% |
| 1911 | 1,020 | −1.09% |

| Year | Pop. | ±% p.a. |
|---|---|---|
| 1921 | 867 | −1.61% |
| 1931 | 769 | −1.19% |
| 1962 | 665 | −0.47% |
| 1968 | 753 | +2.09% |
| 1975 | 889 | +2.40% |
| 1982 | 898 | +0.14% |
| 1990 | 915 | +0.23% |
| 1999 | 982 | +0.79% |
| 2007 | 1,137 | +1.85% |
| 2012 | 1,263 | +2.12% |
| 2017 | 1,325 | +0.96% |
| 2023 | 1,150 | −2.33% |

Source: Insee and Cassini

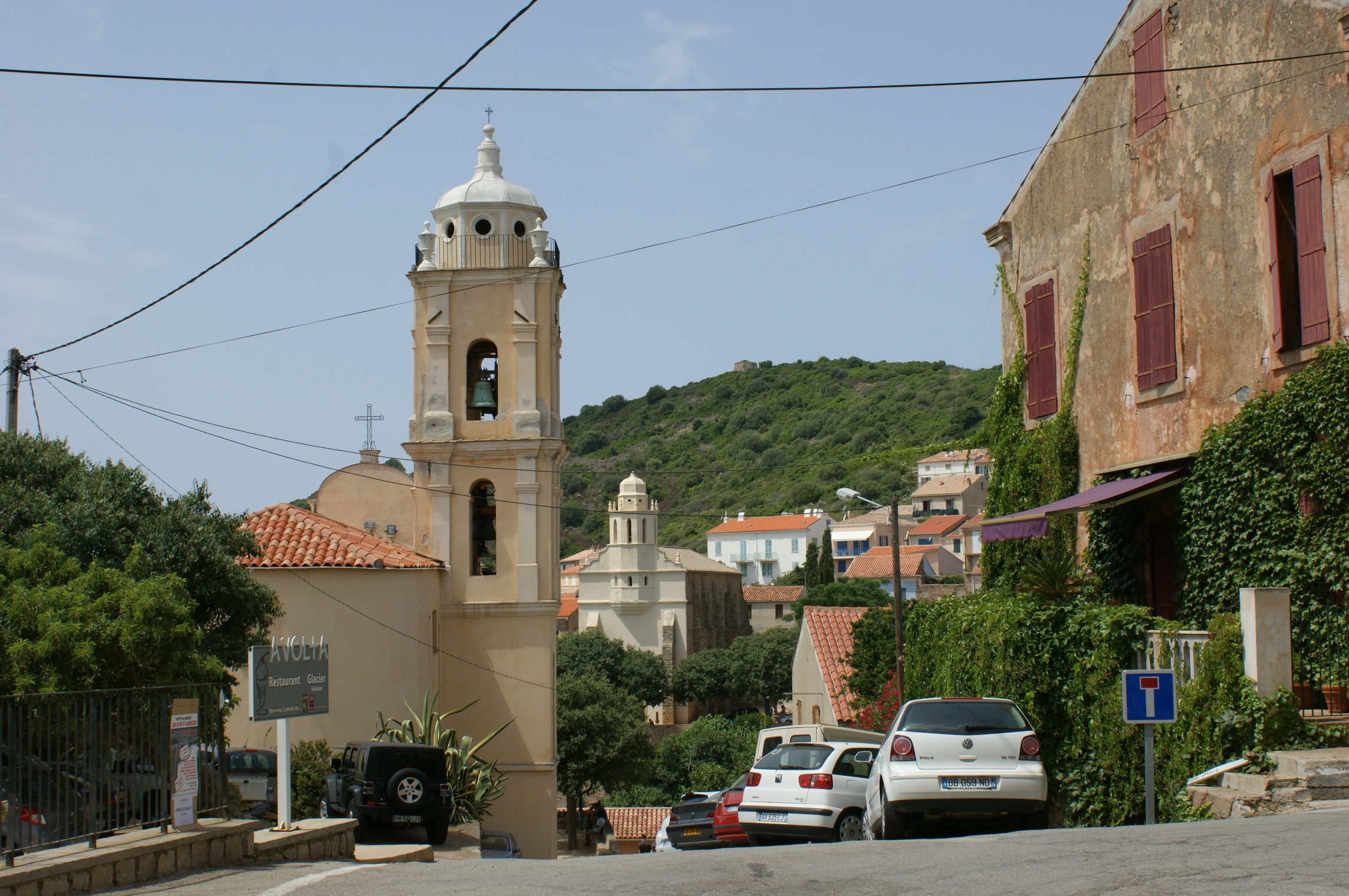
The Latin church (foreground) facing the Greek church (background).

== Churches ==
The village contains two 19th-century Catholic churches that face one another across a small valley overlooking the sea. The church on the east side was built by native Corsicans and descendants of the Greek colonists who had adopted the Latin liturgical rites. The church on the west side, the Greek church, was built by the descendants of the Greek colonists who had retained the use of the Byzantine Rite. From 1964 until 2005, Monseigneur Florent Marchiano conducted services in the two churches on alternate Sundays. On his retirement he was not replaced and instead each Sunday a priest from Vico comes to the village to conduct mass in the Latin church. A priest based in Athens, Archimandrite Armaos Athanasios, visits Cargèse several times a year to conduct services in the Greek church. As of September 2021, Archimandrite Antoine Forget was transferred from the Greek Melkite Catholic parish in Marseille to be pastor of both the Greek and Latin churches in Cargese, allowing weekly liturgies in both churches.

=== Latin church of the Assumption ===
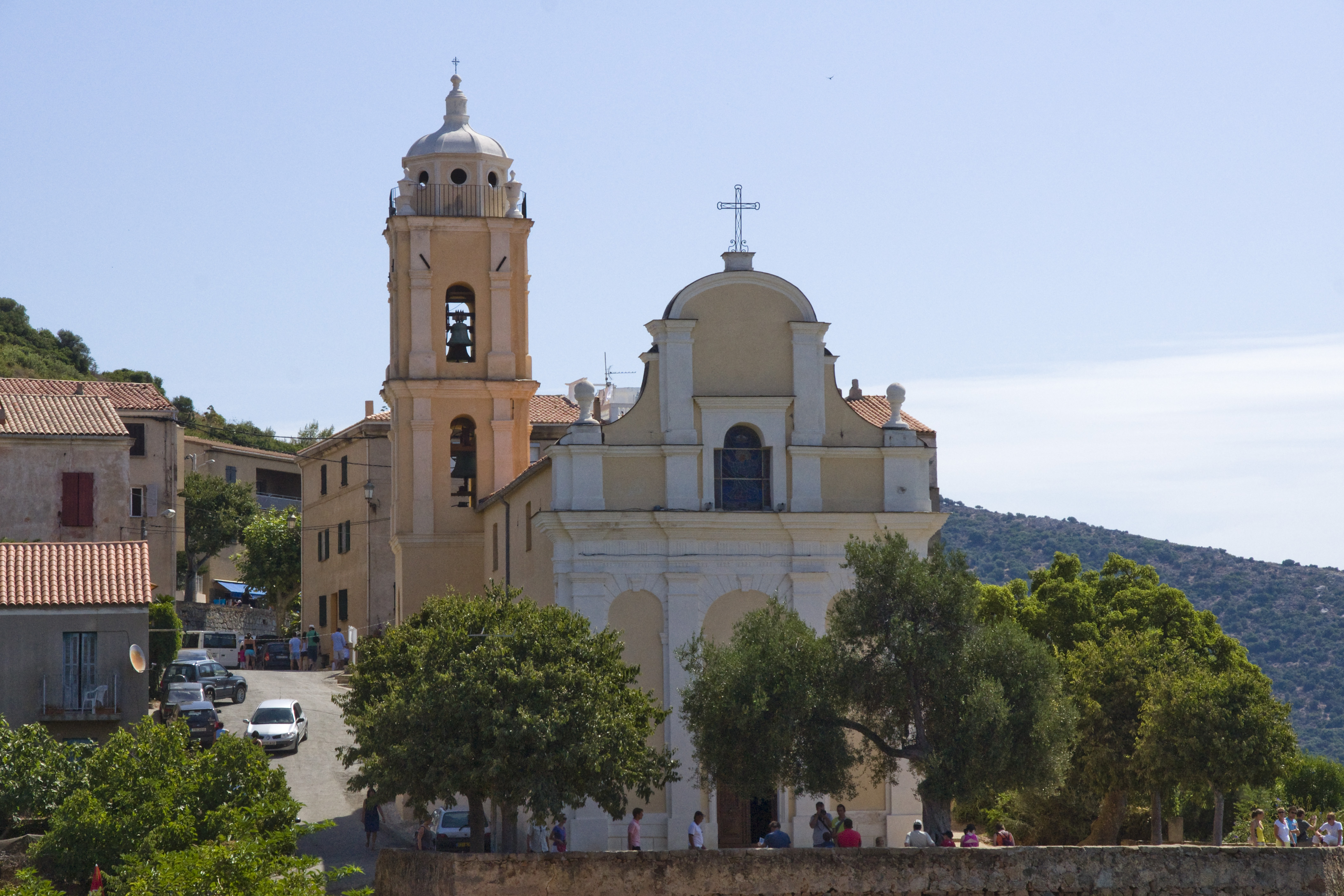
The Latin church

The Latin church was the first to be built. Construction began in 1825 but was held up because of the lack of finance. A total of 14 requests were made to the French government for assistance before the church was completed 1850. The trompe-l'œil decoration was executed in 1928-1930 by the Russian painter Nicolas Ivanoff, a resident of Cargèse. The nave was decorated by Edmond Rocchiccioli between 1970 and 1975 while the choir was decorated between 1992 and 1997 by Russian artists Anastassiya Sokolova and Valeri Tchernoritski.

In 1999-2000 the church was completely restored in a project jointly financed by the Assemblée Régionale Corse, the Conseil Général de la Corse du Sud and the Commune of Cargèse.

The building consists of a barrel-vaulted nave with two semicircular side chapels. The choir is separated from the nave by steps and the communion table. The square bell tower on the north side of the church is capped by an octagonal lantern. The three bells date from 1887.

Above the entrance door is a 17th-century painting attributed to the School of Bologna. This work originally formed part of the collection of Cardinal Fesch and is one of four paintings given to Cargèse by the town of Ajaccio in 1865. Each of the churches now houses two of the paintings. The stained-glass window above the main entrance representing the Immaculate Conception was installed in 2000.

=== Greek Catholic church of Saint Spyridon ===
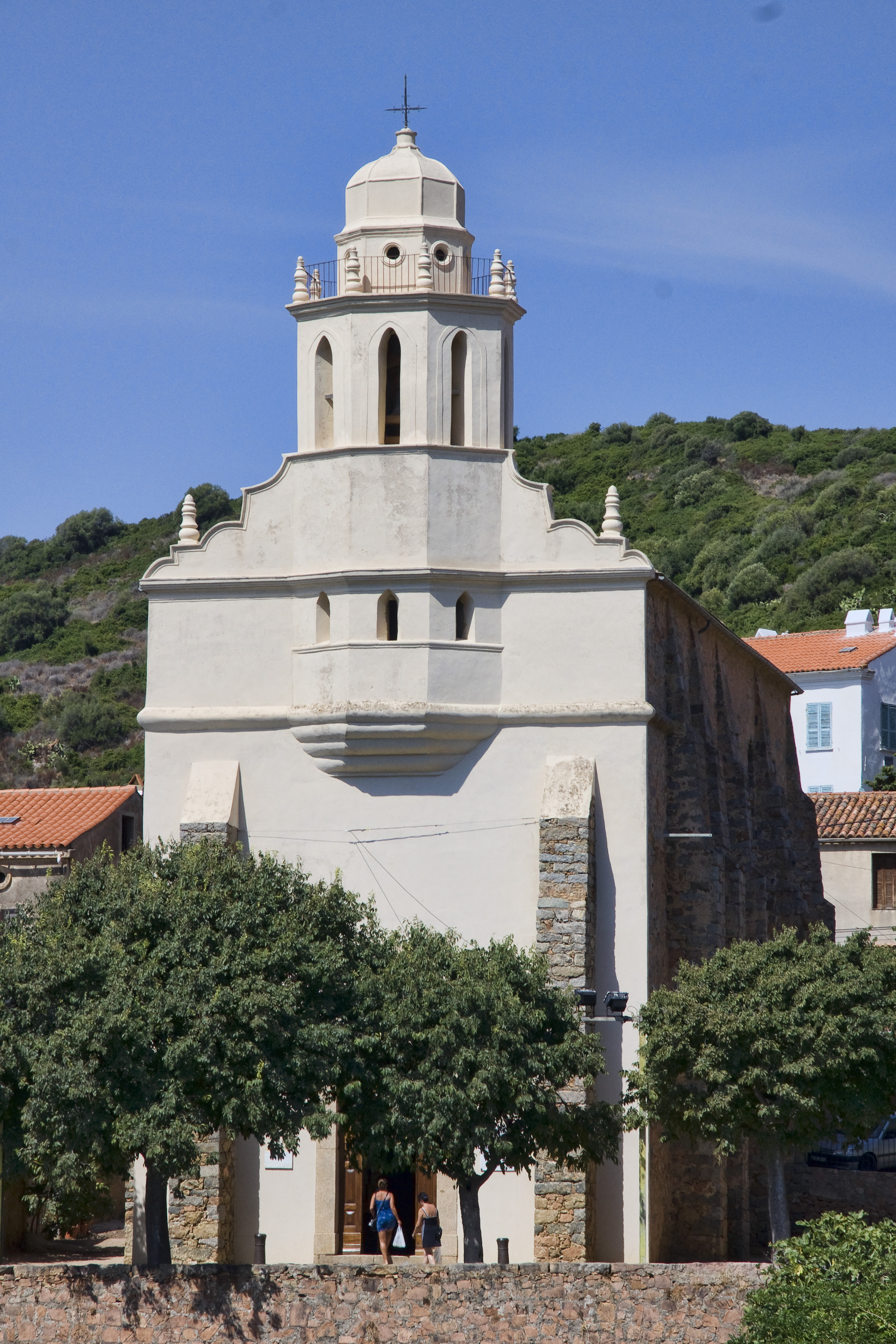
The Greek church

The Greek Catholic church is on the west side of the little valley of Murgana. Construction of the church began in 1852 but progress was slow. The English artist and poet Edward Lear visited Cargèse in 1868 and noted "the large building which is so conspicuous in all the views of Carghèsè, and which they tell me is the new Greek church; it is a mere shell, standing unfinished for lack of funds". The church was finally completed in 1876. The iconostasis, the wooden partition separating the nave from the sanctuary, had been designed in 1881 for the Basilian monastery of Santa Maria in Grottaferrata near Rome but a liturgical argument prevented it from being installed and in 1886 it was offered instead to the Greek church in Cargèse.

As in the Latin church, the trompe-l'œil decoration was executed in 1928-1930 by the Russian painter Nicolas Ivanoff. The frescos were the result of an initiative of Florent Marchiano, who served as the priest of the two churches from 1964 till his retirement in 2005. They were painted by a number of different artists beginning in 1987. The final four were completed in 2001: the Last Judgement on the right of the entrance, the prophet Isaiah on the left of the entrance, three recent priests (Marchiano, Chappet, and Coti) climbing stairs, and finally a large fresco at the back of the church symbolising the history of the colony (the departure from Vitylo in 1675, seeking refuge in Ajaccio in 1731 and arriving in Cargèse in 1775).

The church contains four icons that were brought to Corsica with the colonists in 1676.

1. hanging high up on the right hand side of the church near the iconostasis is the icon of the Three Holy Hierarchs: Basil of Caesarea, Gregory of Nazianzus and John Chrysostom. The painting is in egg tempera on a wooden panel. It dates from the last quarter of the 17th century.
2. high on the left hand side is an icon of John the Baptist with the wings of an angel. He is dressed in animal skins and has a cross and a scroll in his right hand. The haloed head at his feet foreshadows his beheading. The painting dates from the last quarter of the 17th century and is in egg tempera on a wooden panel. An inscription in Greek gives the artist as Simeon Palaiologos, a monk from Mount Athos.
3. above the entrance door hangs an Epitaphios, a picture of Christ being placed in his tomb, shown in bas-relief on painted wood. The three figures are Christ's mother Mary, Nicodemus and Joseph of Arimathea.
4. behind the iconostasis is an icon of the Virgin Mary with the infant Jesus in her arms surrounded by golden clouds with angels and cherubs. At the bottom of the picture are Saint Spyridion and Saint Nicholas. This fourth icon is paraded through the village on feast days.

== Geography ==
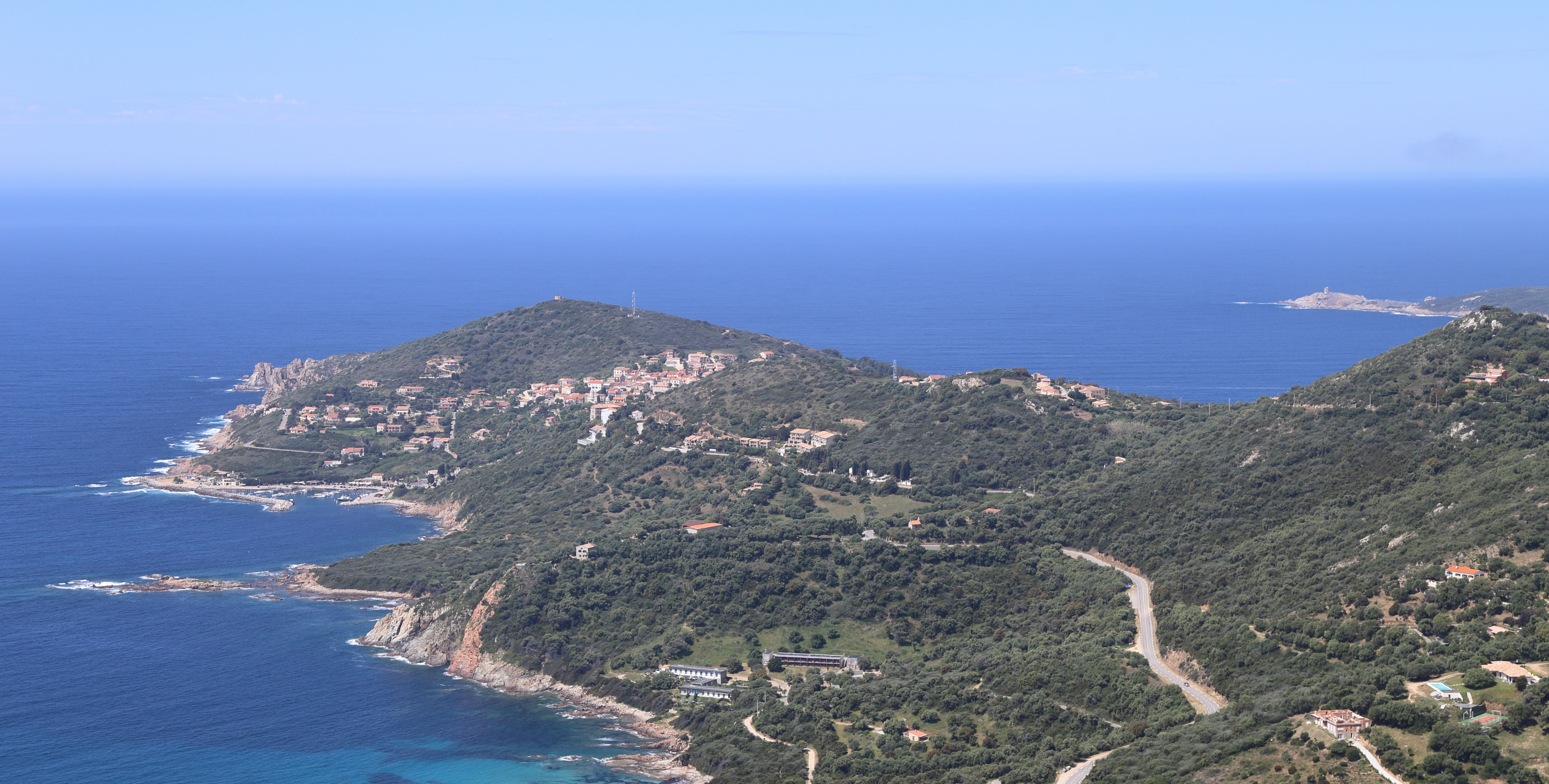
View showing the village perched on the headland

The commune of Cargèse is on the west coast of Corsica, 25 km 'as the crow flies' north of Ajaccio but 50 km by road. The countryside consists of small mountains whose highest peak is Capu di Bagliu (701 m). There are two plains that are each crossed by a small river, the Esigna and the Chiuni. To the north east is a wooded area, the forest of Esigna. The ragged coastline has three granite headlands each dominated by a Genoese tower: the Punta d’Orchinu, the Punta d’Ormigna and the Punta di Cargèse (sometimes referred to as the Punta di u Puntiglione).

The coast has five beaches that are from north to south:

- Chiuni beach is 7 km by road from the village and the former site of the Club Méditerranée holiday resort. The beach is bounded on the northern end by mouth of the Chiesaccia and Chiuni rivers. A small tributary of the Chiuni river, the Truscielli, marks part of the boundary of the commune of Cargèse with that of Piana.
- Peru beach lies just to the north of the village. At the northern end of the beach is the mouth of the Esigna, a small river that flows during the winter months. The central section of the beach is patrolled by life-guards during the summer tourist season.
- Menasina beach is 3 km east of the village.
- Capizollu beach is between the Punta di Molendinu and the Pointe des Moines. This is believed to be where the Greek colonists came ashore in 1676 on their way to Paomia.
- Stagnoli beach is 6.8 km by road south of the village and the site of a UCPA water-sports centre. The small Bubia river flows into the sea at this point and marks the boundary of the commune of Cargèse with that of Vico.

The village of Cargèse is located on the Punta di Cargèse, a promontory that forms the northern limit of the Gulf of Sagone. The village sits nearly 100 m above the sea and has impressive views. The commune includes the hamlets of Frimicaghiola, Marchese, Menasina, Lozzi and Chiuni. Apart from the village with its old houses, the coastline is dotted with recent buildings which are used for summer tourism (summer camp and rental accommodation). The headlands and the adjacent coastline are protected as the land has been purchased by an agency of the French state, the Conservatoire du littoral.

Cargèse is served by the road (D81) that connects Mezzavia (Ajaccio) to Calvi. The nearest villages along this road are Piana (19 km) to the north and Sagone (13 km) to the south. There is also a small road (D181) from the village that passes through Paomia and joins the main road linking Sagone with Vico (D70).

Autocars Ile de Beauté (S.A.S.A.I.B.) operate a bus service running between Ajaccio and Ota that stops in Cargèse. Each day there are two buses in each direction except on Sundays and bank holidays when no buses operate. The journey from Cargèse to Ajaccio takes around one hour.

== Climate ==
The climate is typically Mediterranean with warm dry summers and cool wet winters. August is the hottest month with an average maximum temperature of 29 °C and minimum of 18 °C. January is the coldest month with average maximum of 14 °C and minimum of 4 °C. The wettest months are October and November. Very little rainfall occurs in June, July and August.

== Economy ==
Many people in the commune derive their income from tourism especially during the summer months. In 2020 there were 8 small hotels with a total of 116 bedrooms. Of the hotels, one was classified as providing three-star accommodation (Les Lentisques), 5 had two stars, one had one star and one was unclassified. There is also a campsite (Camping Torraccia) 4 km north of the village with 120 pitches. Many tourists rent accommodation. In 2017 there were 1,887 dwellings of which 625 were main residences while 1,262 were second homes or holiday accommodation. There has been a very substantial increase in all types of housing in the commune – the census of 1968 recorded 254 main residences and only 12 second homes or holiday homes.

Only a few people in the commune earn a living from agriculture. At the end of 2015 there were 9 establishments in the primary sector (agriculture, forestry and fishery), with no paid employees. Only 15 ha was used for vines, fruit and olives. The remaining 1137 ha was used for grazing, mostly cattle, with smaller numbers of sheep and goats. The transhumance is still practised: animals are moved up to the mountains in May to graze at high altitude during the dry summer months and brought back in October to pastures near the village where they spend the winter. While in the past the animals would have walked they are now taken by truck.

There are half a dozen small fishing boats that operate from Cargèse. Each boat has a crew of two or three and is equipped with a motor-driven wheel, usually at the bow, for hauling in the trammel nets. An important target species is the red spiny lobster (Palinurus elephas, langouste in French) which can only be legally fished between 1 March and 30 September. In the past lobster pots were used but these have generally been superseded by nets. The catch is generally small and most is sold locally.

A scientific conference centre, the Institut d'Études Scientifiques de Cargèse, is located near the coast about 1.5 km east of the village. It was established in 1975 and initially hosted conferences on theoretical physics. Since 1996 it has been run by the CNRS, the government financed scientific research organization. The centre hosts around 30 week-long conferences each year on a wide range of topics. The centre has a maximum capacity of 100 people, but as there is only limited accommodation within the conference complex, most attendees rent rooms or stay in hotels in the village.

There is a combined nursery and primary school in the village for children between the ages 3 and 11 (Groupe Scolaire, Rue du Colonel Fieschi). In 2012-2013 there were 72 children. Older children are bussed to the Collège Camille Borossi in Vico, a distance of 27 km.

== Marina ==
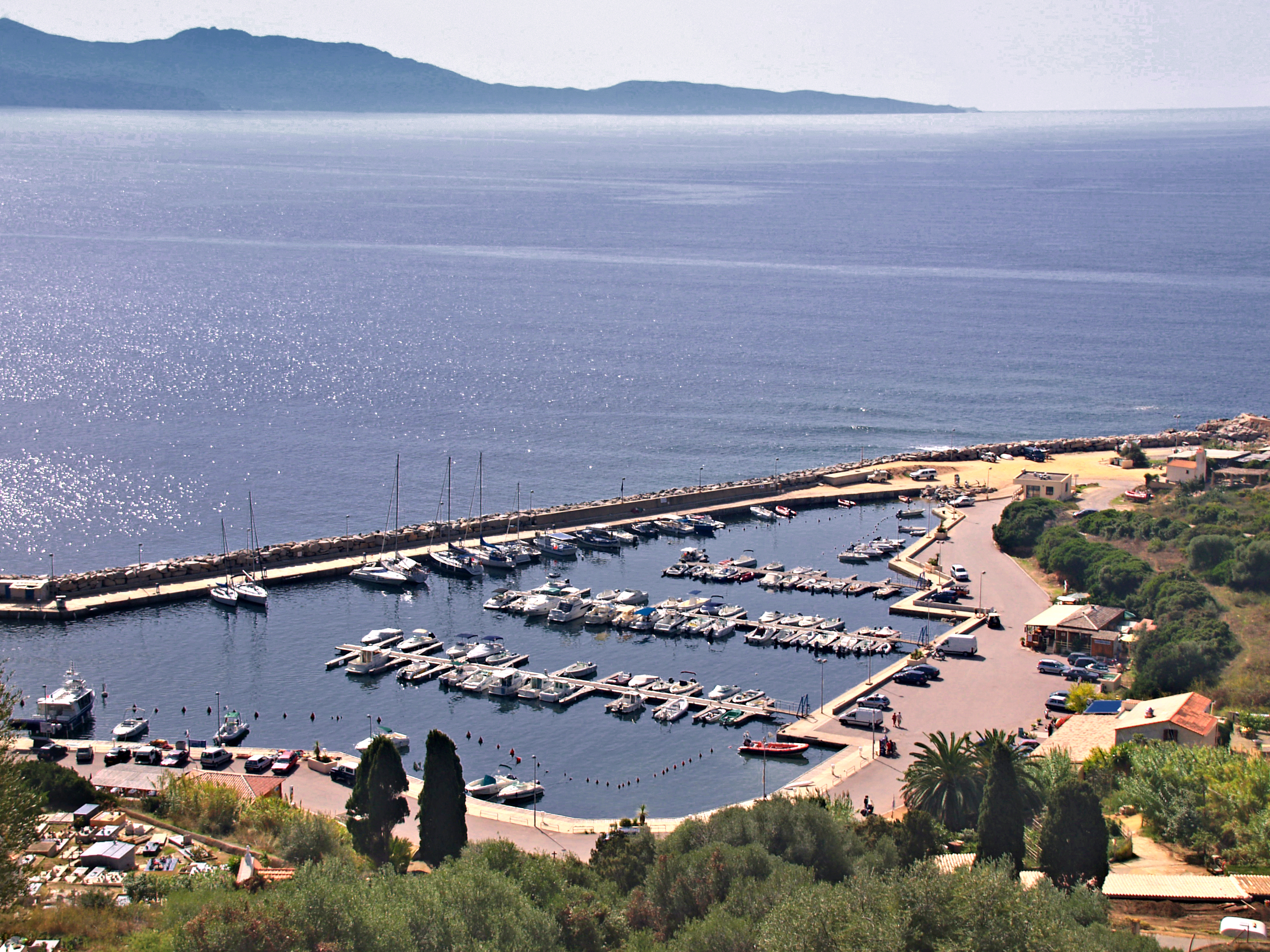
The marina of Cargèse

Until the 1970s fishing boats would moor off a small protected beach to the south of the village. In the winter the boats would be hauled up onto the beach with a windlass. The whole area has now been developed into a marina.

The marina is accessible either by road or by a steep path that runs between the two churches and then alongside the cemetery. The harbour is protected by a jetty running 200 m in a north-easterly direction and can accommodate 235 boats with a maximum length of 16 m. There are 35 places allocated for visitors. The depth at the entrance is 5 m but this reduces to only 2.5 m within the harbour. Fuel, fresh water and mains power are available. There are three restaurants on the quayside but no shops. Provisions are available from a supermarket near the Place Saint-Jean 100 m above the port at the top of the village. In good weather vessels can anchor east of the harbour entrance in water with a minimum depth of 6 m.

== Three towers ==
The three Genoese towers in the commune were built between 1605 and 1606:

- Tour de Cargèse, near the village, on the Punta di Cargèse
- Tour d'Omigna, to the north of the village, on the Punta d'Omigna
- Tour d'Orchinu, to the north of the village, on the Punta d'Orchinu

== Sources ==
- Coppolani, J. (1949), "Cargèse. Essai sur la géographie humaine d'un village corse", Revue de Géographie Alpine (in French), 37 (1): 71–108, doi:10.3406/rga.1949.5457.
- Elliot, Gilbert (1874), Life and Letters of Sir Gilbert Elliot, First Earl of Minto, from 1751 to 1806. Volume II, London: Longmans, Green and Co., pp. 307–310.
- Galletti, Jean-Ange (1863), Histoire illustrée de la Corse (in French), Paris: Pillet fils ainé, pp. 131–136.
- Goury de Champgrand, Jean François (1749), Histoire de l'isle de Corse: contenant en abrégé les principaux événemens de ce pays (in French), Nancy, France: A.D. Cusson, pp. 274–296.
- Graziani, Antoine-Marie (1992), Les Tours Littorales (in French and Italian), Ajaccio, France: Alain Piazzola, ISBN 978-2-907161-06-0.
- Graziani, Antoine-Marie (2000), "Les ouvrages de défense en Corse contre les Turcs (1530–1650)", in Vergé-Franceschi, Michel; Graziani, Antoine-Marie (eds.), La guerre de course en Méditerranée (1515-1830) (in French), Paris: Presses de l'Université Paris IV-Sorbonne, pp. 73–144, ISBN 978-2-84050-167-1.
- Lear, Edward (1870), Journal of a landscape painter in Corsica, London: R.J. Bush.
- Marchment, John (2007), Corsica and North Sardinia, St. Ives, UK: Imray Laurie Norie & Wilson, ISBN 978-0-85288-914-5.
- Nicholas, Nick (2005), "A history of the Greek colony of Corsica", Journal of the Hellenic Diaspora, 31 (1), New York: 33–78.
- Nicholas, Nick (2006), "Negotiating a Greco-Corsican identity" (PDF), Journal of Modern Greek Studies, 24: 91–133, doi:10.1353/mgs.2006.0009, S2CID 145285702, archived from the original (PDF) on 13 June 2010.
- Stephanopoli de Comnène, Nicolaos (1826), Histoire de la colonie grecque établie en Corse (in French), Paris: A. Thoisnier-Desplaces.
- Stephanopoli de Comnène, Michel (2002), Histoire des Grecs–Maniotes en Corse: III. Cargèse 1776-1894 (in French), Athens: Études Laconiennes, ISBN 978-960-86254-3-3.
- Wilson, Stephen (2002), Feuding, Conflict and Banditry in Nineteenth-Century Corsica, Cambridge: Cambridge University Press, ISBN 978-0-521-52264-9. First published in 1988.
