= Torra d'Orchinu =

Genoese coastal defence tower in Corsica

Tower of Orchinu
- Torra d'Orchinu (Corsican)
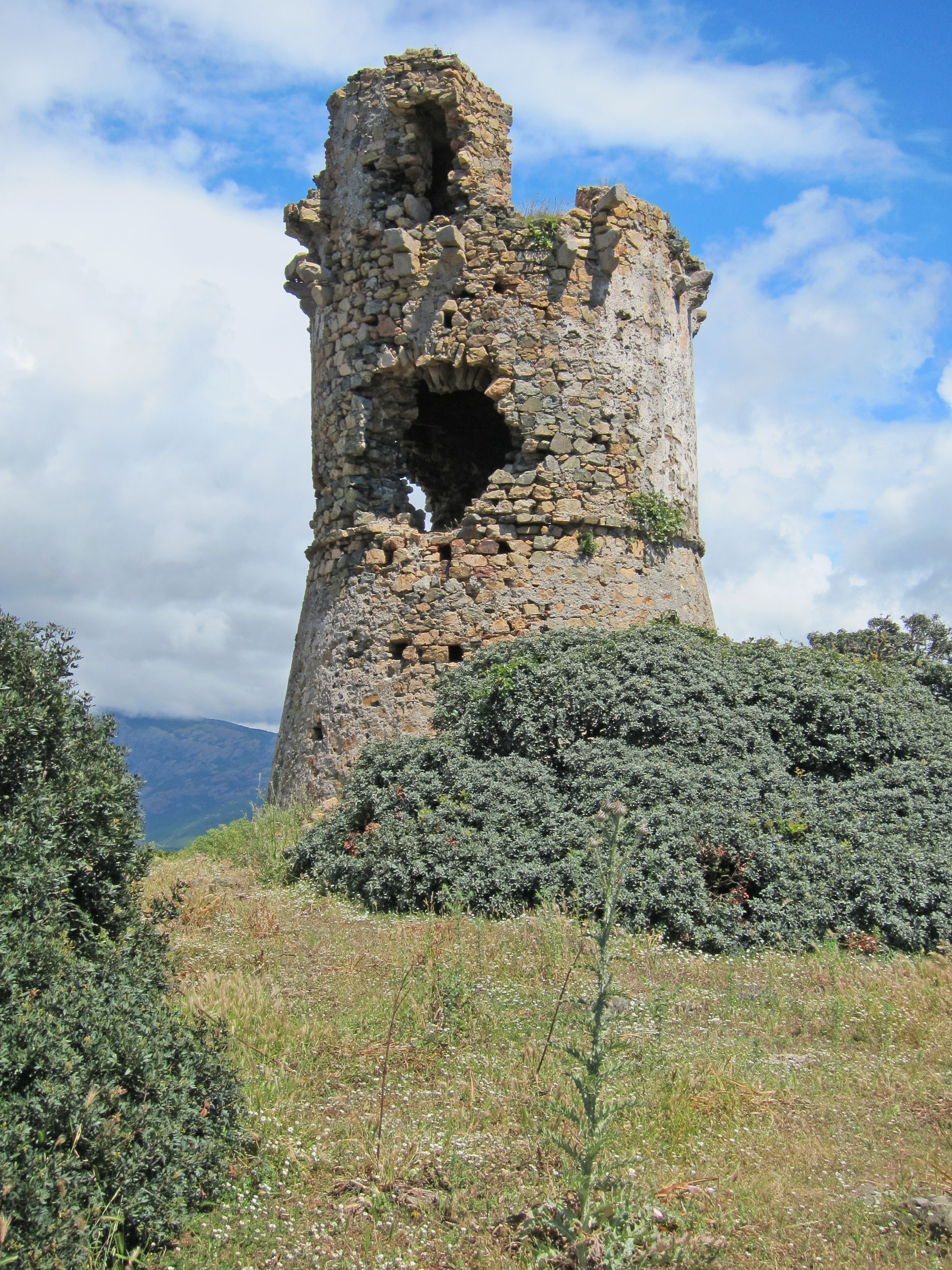

- Location within Corsica
- 42°10′32″N 8°34′36″E

History
- Built: 1605–1606

Site notes
- Architect: Giacomo della Piana

The Tower of Orchinu (Corsican: Torra d'Orchinu) is a ruined Genoese tower located in the commune of Cargèse on the Corsica. It sits at an elevation of 172 metres (564 ft) on the Punta d'Orchinu headland.

The tower was one of a series of coastal defences constructed by the Republic of Genoa between 1530 and 1620 to stem the attacks by Barbary pirates. The Tour d'Orchinu tower was built between 1605 and 1606 under the direction of Giacomo della Piana.

Portions of the headland and the adjacent coastline covering an area of 190 hectares (470 acres) are owned by an agency of the French state, the Conservatoire du littoral.

== See also ==
- List of Genoese towers in Corsica
