= Yves Rocard =

French physicist

- Born: Yves-André Rocard; 22 May 1903; Vannes, France
- Died: 16 March 1992 (aged 88); 5th arrondissement of Paris, France
- Education: Lycée Louis-le-Grand
- Alma mater: École normale supérieure University of Paris
- Known for: Atomic bomb
- Children: Michel Rocard
- Awards: Holweck Medal (1948)
- Scientific career
- Fields: Physics
- Workplaces: École Normale Supérieure
- Thesis: L'hydrodynamique et la théorie cinétique des gaz

Yves-André Rocard (French pronunciation: [iv ʁɔkaʁ]; 22 May 1903 – 16 March 1992) was a French physicist who helped develop the atomic bomb for France.

== Biography ==
Rocard was born in Vannes. After obtaining a double doctorate in mathematics (1927) and physics (1928) he was awarded a professorship in electronic physics at the École normale supérieure in Paris.

As a member of a Resistance group during the Second World War he flew to the UK in a small plane as part of a dangerous mission and was able to provide British intelligence with invaluable information about German radar. There he met up with Charles de Gaulle who named him Director of Research in the Forces navales françaises libres (the Navy of Free France). He became particularly interested in the detection of solar radio emissions by British Radar, which were causing military problems by jamming detection during periods of high emission, and was able to create a new radio navigational beam station.

As research director, Rocard followed the French troops entering Germany. He succeeded in finding German specialists, e.g. in infrared and wireless Pathfinding and engaged them to serve in France. With the group of nuclear physicists around Werner Heisenberg and Otto Hahn he did not succeed because Samuel Abraham Goudsmit arrived at Hechingen earlier. At Freiburg (then also in the French zone) Rocard protected the solar observatory and founded a French navy-owned ionospheric prediction service with Karl Rawer as scientific director.

Returning to France after the war, Rocard took up his position as the head of the physics department at the ENS. Whilst there, he founded a radio observatory, having obtained two German "Wurzburg" Radar mirrors from the war.

From 1947 he became a scientific advisor to the French military on the subject of atomic energy, eventually taking over from Frédéric Joliot-Curie after the latter was dismissed for political reasons. In 1951, Rocard became the scientific head of the French nuclear arms programme, and he is often known as the father of the French A-Bomb and H-bomb.

Later in his career, he studied subjects ranging from semiconductors to seismology. His professional reputation eventually became tarnished by his increased focus on less conventional subjects such as biomagnetism, dowsing and UFOs.

He was the father of Michel Rocard, Prime Minister of France between 1988 and 1991.

On his death in Paris in 1992, Yves Rocard was interred in the Montparnasse Cemetery.

== Awards and honors ==
He was awarded the British CBE (1946), and the French Legion of Honour and National Order of Merit.

== Works ==
- Cabannes (Jean) - La diffusion moléculaire de la lumière - in participation with Yves Rocard, PUF, 1931.
- L'hydrodynamique et la théorie cinétique des gaz. Paris: Gauthier-Villars, 1932.
- Diffusion de la lumière et visibilité, projecteurs, feux, instruments d'observation. Paris, 1935.
- Propagation et absorption du son. Paris: Hermann, 1935.
- La stabilité de route des locomotives. Paris: Hermann, 1935.
- Les phénomènes d'auto-oscillation dans les installations hydrauliques. Paris: Hermann, 1937.
- Les Sourciers (Que sais-je, n° 1939, ISBN 2-13-043539-4).
- Théorie des oscillateurs. Paris, 1941.
- Dynamique générale des vibrations. Paris: Masson, 1951.
  - translation: General dynamics of vibrations, 1960. ISBN 1124158839 LCCN 60-51871
- L'instabilité en mécanique; automobiles, avions, ponts suspendus. Paris: Masson, 1954.
  - translation by M. L. Meyer: Dynamic instability: automobiles, aircraft, suspension bridges, 1957. LCCN 58-2448
- Le signal du sourcier (Dunod 1962).
- Electricité. Paris: Masson, 1966.
- Thermodynamique. Paris: Masson, 1967
- Mémoires sans concessions. Paris: Grasset, 1988. ISBN 2246411211
- La science et les sourciers; baguettes, pendules, biomagnétisme. Paris: (Dunod 1989, ISBN 2-10-002996-7)
