= Institute of Theoretical Physics, Saclay =

Research institute in Saclay, France

The Institute of Theoretical Physics ("Institut de physique théorique") (IPhT) is a research institute of the Direction of Fundamental Research (DRF) of the French Alternative Energies and Atomic Energy Commission (CEA). The Institute is also a joint research unit of the Institute of Physics (INP), a subsidiary of the French National Center for Scientific Research (CNRS). It is associated to the Paris-Saclay University. IPhT is situated on the Saclay Plateau South of Paris.

== History ==
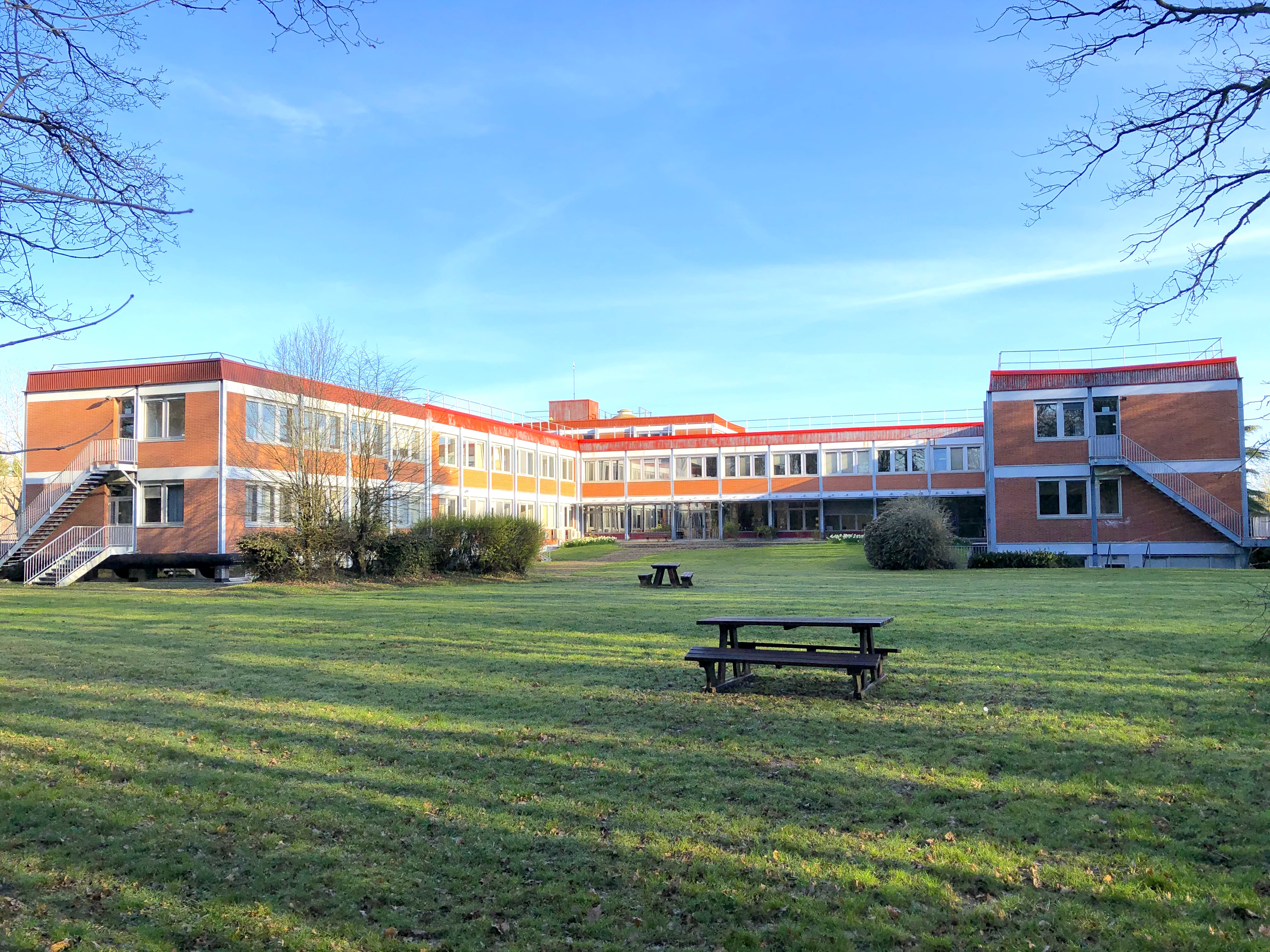
South view of IPhT.

The IPhT was created in 1963 as the "Service de Physique Théorique" (SPhT), in succession of the "Service de Physique Mathématique" (SPM) of CEA. It became an Institute (and took the name IPhT) in 2008. It was initially devoted to nuclear physics and superconductivity. Particle physics quickly became an important theme. After its move in 1968 from the main CEA-Saclay site to the present site of Orme des Merisiers, quantum field theory became a major research topic, together with statistical physics. Subsequently, new topics such as conformal theories and matrix models, cosmology and string theory, condensed matter physics and out-of-equilibrium statistical physics, quantum information, found their place there. IPhT is usually considered one of the top theoretical physics research institute in Europe.

== Present research themes ==
Research at IPhT covers most areas of theoretical physics:

- Cosmology and astroparticule physics
- Particle Physics : quantum chromodynamics, hadron physics, Collider physics, scattering amplitudes, physics beyond the standard model
- Quantum Gravity, String theory
- Mathematical Physics : Quantum field theory, conformal field theory, integrable systems, topological recursion, combinatorics, random geometries
- Condensed matter physics
- Statistical Physics: out of equilibrium systems, complex systems, network theory, biophysics
- Quantum information science

IPhT organizes each spring the "Itzykson Conference", an international meeting centered on theme which is different every year. Its name is a tribute to Claude Itzykson, former IPhT researcher.

== Teaching ==
IPhT is not part of a teaching department, but graduate and postgraduate courses of theoretical physics are organized at IPhT. They are aimed at graduate students and researchers of Paris area. The lecturers are researchers from IPhT or other Paris Area labs, and senior visitors of IPhT. Most courses are part of the courses of the Ecole Doctorale Physique en Ile de France (EDPIF).

IPhT hosts numerous master and graduate students, as well as postdoctoral researchers.

== Research dissemination and outreach ==
Talks and conferences of IPhT are usually available by live streaming and are available for replay on the IPhT YouTube channel.

Outreach talks and presentations for the general public are also available there.

Many scientific books are being published by researchers from IPhT, aiming at students and researchers as well as at the general public.

== Researchers of IPhT ==
Some researchers who held permanent positions at SPM/SPhT/IPhT:

Claude Bloch, Édouard Brézin, Gilles Cohen-Tannoudji, Cirano de Dominicis, Bernard Derrida, Michel Gaudin, Claude Itzykson, Stanislas Leibler, Madan Lal Mehta, Albert Messiah, Stéphane Nonnenmacher, Yves Pomeau, Volker Schomerus, Raymond Stora, Lenka Zdeborová, Jean Zinn-Justin, Jean-Bernard Zuber

Some researchers who are presently members of IPhT:(2023)

Roger Balian, Marc Barthelemy, Jean-Paul Blaizot, François David, Philippe Di Francesco, David Kosower, Vincent Pasquier, Mannque Rho, Hubert Saleur, Pierre Vanhove, André Voros

== Directors of IPhT ==
- Claude Bloch: 1963–1971
- Cirano de Dominicis: 1971–1979
- Roger Balian: 1979–1987
- André Morel: 1987–1992
- Jean Zinn–Justin: 1993–1998
- Jean–Paul Blaizot: 1998–2004
- Henri Orland: 2004–2011
- Michel Bauer: 2011–2016
- François David: 2017–2021
- Catherine Pépin: 2022–

== Campus ==
The IPhT is located on the Plateau de Saclay, about 20 km southwest of Paris, on the Orme des Merisiers site, which is an annex of the main CEA-Saclay center.
