= Prix Jean Ricard =

French science award

The Prix Jean-Ricard is a prize awarded by the Société française de physique (SFP) to a French physicist for remarkable and original work. Jean Ricard, alumnus of École Polytechnique, engineer École supérieure d'électricité (E.S.E), and member of the SFP since 1925, donated to the SFP in April 1970 a portfolio of securities amounting to around four million francs to found the prize. The prize has been awarded each year since 1971.

== List of laureates ==
- 1971 Claude Cohen-Tannoudji
- 1972 Claude Bloch
- 1973 Georges Charpak
- 1974 Jacques Winter
- 1975 Paul Musset
- 1976 Georges Slodzian
- 1977 Roger Balian
- 1978 Michel Hénon
- 1979 Albert Libchaber
- 1980 Maurice Kléman
- 1981 Paul Henri Rebut
- 1982 Étienne Guyon
- 1983 Serge Haroche
- 1984 Jean Iliopoulos
- 1985 Jacques Villain
- 1986 Yves Pomeau
- 1987 Cirano de Dominicis
- 1988 Joseph Rémilleux
- 1989 Jean-Loup Puget
- 1990 Marcel Banner
- 1991 Dominique Vautherin
- 1992 Raymond Stora
- 1993 Guy Laval
- 1994 Albert Fert
- 1995 Jacques Prost
- 1996 Gilbert Grynberg
- 1997 Jean-Paul Blaizot
- 1998 Françoise Brochard-Wyart
- 1999 Denis Gratias
- 2000 Jean Dalibard
- 2001 Yves Declay
- 2002 Jacques Meunier
- 2003 Alain Benoit
- 2004 Alain Blondel
- 2005 Yannick Mellier
- 2006 Élisabeth Charlaix
- 2007 Jean-Michel Raimond
- 2008 Philippe Grangier
- 2009 Patrick Bruno
- 2010 Gilles Chabrier
- 2011 Daniel Fournier
- 2012 Sébastien Balibar
- 2013 Daniel Esteve
- 2014 Guillaume Unal
- 2015 Jacqueline Bloch
- 2016 Jean-Yves Bigot
- 2017 Anne-Marie Lagrange
- 2018 Hubert Saleur
- 2019 Xavier Marie
- 2020 Luc Blanchet
- 2021 Aleksandra Walczak
- 2022 Jacky Even
- 2023 Pascale Senellart
- 2024 Marc Barthelemy
