= Claude Itzykson =

French theoretical physicist (1938–1995)

Claude Georges Itzykson
- Born: 11 April 1938; Paris, France
- Died: 22 May 1995 (aged 57); Paris, France
- Education: Lycée Condorcet
- Alma mater: École Polytechnique
- Known for: Quantum field theory
- Awards: Prix Paul-Langevin (1972); Prix Félix-Robin (1988); Ampère Prize (1995)
- Scientific career
- Fields: Physics
- Workplaces: Saclay Nuclear Research Centre

Claude Georges Itzykson (11 April 1938 – 22 May 1995) was a French theoretical physicist who worked in quantum field theory and statistical mechanics.

== Biography ==
Separated from his parents by World War II, his father was taken to a Nazi concentration camp and Itzykson is raised in a Jewish orphanage in Maisons-Laffitte. After studying at the Lycée Condorcet Itzykson graduated from the Ecole Polytechnique in 1959. He joined the Theoretical Physics Department of the CEA in Saclay in 1962, then headed by Claude Bloch. He spent most of his career at Saclay, except for numerous visiting positions he held throughout his working life, such as at the Institute for Advanced Study, Princeton.

== Works ==
He was a specialist in quantum field theory and applications of group theory in physics. In particular, he worked on the symmetries of the hydrogen atom, the discretization of network gauge theories, the integrals on large matrices and their applications to problems of combinatorics and physics of random surfaces, and conformal field theories and their classification.

His first works were done in collaboration with Maurice Jacob and Raymond Stora. In 1980 he published a treatise on quantum field theory with Jean-Bernard Zuber that became a staple textbook on the subject.

== Awards ==
In 1995 Itzykson received the Ampère Prize of the French Academy of Sciences.

== Bibliography ==
=== Textbooks ===
- Itzykson, C.; Zuber, J.-B. (1980). Quantum Field Theory (2005 ed.). Mineola, New York: Dover Publications. ISBN 978-0-486-44568-7. LCCN 2005053026. OCLC 61200849.
- Itzykson, C.; Drouffe, J.-M. (1989a). Statistical Field Theory Volume 1. From Brownian Motion to Renormalization and Lattice Gauge Theory. Cambridge: Cambridge University Press. ISBN 0-521-34058-6. LCCN 88030162. OCLC 852124007.
- Itzykson, C.; Drouffe, J.-M. (1989b). Statistical Field Theory Volume 2. Strong coupling, Monte Carlo Methods, Conformal Field Theory, and Random Systems. Cambridge: Cambridge University Press. ISBN 0-521-37012-4. LCCN 88030162. OCLC 852124007.

=== Selected publications ===
- Balian, R.; Drouffe, J. M.; Itzykson, C. (1974). "Gauge fields on a lattice. I. General outlook". Physical Review D. 10 (10): 3376–3395. Bibcode:1974PhRvD..10.3376B. doi:10.1103/PhysRevD.10.3376. ISSN 0556-2821.
- Balian, R.; Drouffe, J. M.; Itzykson, C. (1975). "Gauge fields on a lattice. II. Gauge-invariant Ising model". Physical Review D. 11 (8): 2098–2103. Bibcode:1975PhRvD..11.2098B. doi:10.1103/PhysRevD.11.2098. ISSN 0556-2821.
- Bander, M.; Itzykson, C. (1966). "Group Theory and the Hydrogen Atom (I)" (PDF). Reviews of Modern Physics. 38 (2): 330–345. Bibcode:1966RvMP...38..330B. doi:10.1103/RevModPhys.38.330. ISSN 0034-6861.
- Bauer, M.; Di Francesco, Ph.; Itzykson, C.; Zuber, J.-B. (1991). "Covariant differential equations and singular vectors in virasoro representations" (PDF). Nuclear Physics B. 362 (3): 515–562. Bibcode:1991NuPhB.362..515B. doi:10.1016/0550-3213(91)90541-5. ISSN 0550-3213.
- Bessis, D; Itzykson, C; Zuber, J.B (1980). "Quantum field theory techniques in graphical enumeration". Advances in Applied Mathematics. 1 (2): 109–157. doi:10.1016/0196-8858(80)90008-1. ISSN 0196-8858. S2CID 31392310.
- Brezin, E.; Itzykson, C. (1970). "Pair Production in Vacuum by an Alternating Field". Physical Review D. 2 (7): 1191–1199. Bibcode:1970PhRvD...2.1191B. doi:10.1103/PhysRevD.2.1191. ISSN 0556-2821.
- Brézin, E.; Itzykson, C.; Zinn-Justin, J.; Zuber, J.-B. (1979). "Remarks about the existence of non-local charges in two-dimensional models" (PDF). Physics Letters B. 82 (3–4): 442–444. Bibcode:1979PhLB...82..442B. doi:10.1016/0370-2693(79)90263-6. ISSN 0370-2693.
- Brézin, E.; Gross, David J.; Itzykson, C. (1984). "Density of states in the presence of a strong magnetic field and random impurities". Nuclear Physics B. 235 (1): 24–44. Bibcode:1984NuPhB.235...24B. doi:10.1016/0550-3213(84)90146-9. ISSN 0550-3213.
- Brézin, E.; Itzykson, C.; Parisi, G.; Zuber, J. B. (1993). "Planar Diagrams". The Large N Expansion in Quantum Field Theory and Statistical Physics. pp. 567–583. doi:10.1142/9789814365802_0036. ISBN 978-981-02-0455-6.
- Derrida, B.; De Seze, L.; Itzykson, C. (1983). "Fractal structure of zeros in hierarchical models" (PDF). Journal of Statistical Physics. 33 (3): 559–569. Bibcode:1983JSP....33..559D. doi:10.1007/BF01018834. ISSN 0022-4715. S2CID 122632661.
- Drouffe, J. M.; Itzykson, C. (1978). Facts and Prospects of Gauge Theories. pp. 203–204. doi:10.1007/978-3-7091-8538-4_5. ISBN 978-3-7091-8540-7.
- Drouffe, J. M.; Itzykson, C. (1984). "Random geometry and the statistics of two-dimensional cells". Nuclear Physics B. 235 (1): 45–53. Bibcode:1984NuPhB.235...45D. doi:10.1016/0550-3213(84)90147-0. ISSN 0550-3213.
- Itzykson, C.; Zuber, J.-B. (1980b). "The planar approximation. II" (PDF). Journal of Mathematical Physics. 21 (3): 411–421. Bibcode:1980JMP....21..411I. doi:10.1063/1.524438. ISSN 0022-2488.
- Itzykson, C.; Pearson, R.B.; Zuber, J.B. (1983). "Distribution of zeros in Ising and gauge models" (PDF). Nuclear Physics B. 220 (4): 415–433. Bibcode:1983NuPhB.220..415I. doi:10.1016/0550-3213(83)90499-6. ISSN 0550-3213.
- Itzykson, C. (1982a). "Ising fermions (I). Two dimensions". Nuclear Physics B. 210 (4): 448–476. Bibcode:1982NuPhB.210..448I. doi:10.1016/0550-3213(82)90173-0. ISSN 0550-3213.
- Itzykson, C. (1982b). "Ising fermions (II). Three dimensions". Nuclear Physics B. 210 (4): 477–498. Bibcode:1982NuPhB.210..477I. doi:10.1016/0550-3213(82)90174-2. ISSN 0550-3213.
- Itzykson, C. (1995). "Counting Rational Curves on Rational Surfaces" (PDF). Perspectives on Solvable Models. pp. 255–276. doi:10.1142/9789812831279_0017. ISBN 978-981-02-2107-2.
