= Jean-Loup Puget =

French astrophysicist (born 1947)

Jean-Loup Puget (born 7 March 1947) is a French astrophysicist. His current research interests lie in the Cosmic Microwave Background. Jean-Loup Puget and his collaborators reported the first identification of the Cosmic infrared background using COBE data. He is also, along with Alain Léger, credited with the origin of the hypothesis that the series of infrared lines observed in numerous astrophysical objects are caused by emission from polycyclic aromatic hydrocarbons. He is currently principal investigator of the HFI module of the Planck space mission.

He served two terms as director of the Institut d'astrophysique spatiale from 1998 to 2005.

He has been a member of the Académie des sciences (France) since 2002 and was awarded the Prix Jean Ricard in 1989. He received the COSPAR Space Science Award in 2014.

Jean-Loup Puget, Nazzareno Mandolesi and ESA Planck team were awarded 2018 Gruber Prize in Cosmology for their definitive measurements of the properties of our expanding universe. In 2018 he received the Shaw Prize in Astronomy.

== Bibliography ==
- Aspect, Alain; Balibar, Sébastien; Balian, Roger; Bastard, Gérald; Bouchaud, Jean-Philippe; Brézin, Édouard; Cabane, Bernard; Combes, Françoise; Encrenaz, Thérèse; Fauve, Stephan; Fert, Albert; Fink, Mathias; Georges, Antoine; Joanny, Jean-François; Kaplan, Daniel; Le Bihan, Daniel; Léna, Pierre; Le Treut, Hervé; Poirier, Jean-Paul; Prost, Jacques; Puget, Jean-Loup (2009) [1st. Pub. 2004]. Demain, la physique. Odile Jacob. ISBN 9782738123053.
