= Three Physicists Prize =

- Awarded for: Major contributions in physics
- Country: France
- Presented by: École Normale Supérieure (ENS Paris)
- First award: 1951
- Final award: 2019
- Website: https://www.phys.ens.psl.eu/fr/article/prix-des-trois-physiciens

The Three Physicists Prize (French: Prix des trois physiciens, pronounced [pʁi de tʁwa fizisjɛ̃]) is a physics prize awarded by the École Normale Supérieure (ENS) in Paris and the Eugène Bloch Foundation. It is named in honour of the physicists Henri Abraham, Eugene Bloch and Georges Bruhat, who were successive directors of the physics laboratory at the ENS and all of whom were murdered in Nazi concentration camps between 1943 and 1945. The prize was established by Bloch's widow.

== Winners ==
- 1951 Jean Cabannes
- 1952 Maurice Bayen
- 1953 Gustave Ribaud
- 1954 Maurice Ponte
- 1955 not awarded
- 1956 Nevill Francis Mott
- 1957 H. B. G. Casimir
- 1958 J. Robert Oppenheimer
- 1959 André Danjon
- 1960 Gaston Dupouy
- 1961 Max Morand
- 1962 Jean Weigle
- 1963 Louis Néel
- 1964 André Lallemand
- 1965 Alfred Kastler
- 1966 Francis Perrin
- 1967 Pierre Auger
- 1968 Jean-François Denisse
- 1969 Jean-Claude Pecker
- 1970 Albert Kirrmann
- 1971 Jean Coulomb
- 1972 André Guinier
- 1973 Pierre Grivet
- 1974 Jean Rösch
- 1975 Jean Brossel
- 1976 Pierre Jacquinot
- 1977 André Maréchal
- 1978 Marcel Rouault
- 1979 Michel Soutif
- 1980 Robert Klapisch
- 1981 Evry Schatzman
- 1982 Philippe Nozières
- 1983 Bernard Cagnac
- 1984 Raimond Castaing
- 1985 Sylvain Liberman
- 1986 Claude Cohen-Tannoudji
- 1987 Jacques Friedel
- 1988 Philippe Meyer
- 1989 Édouard Brézin
- 1990 Claude Bouchiat
- 1991 Julien Bok
- 1992 Michel Davier
- 1993 Jean-Louis Steinberg
- 1994 Jacques Dupont-Roc
- 1995 Bernard Jancovici
- 1996 Jean-Claude Le Guillou
- 1997 Claire Lhuillier
- 1998 Albert Libchaber
- 1999 Claudette Rigaux
- 2000 Franck Laloë
- 2001 Gérald Bastard
- 2002 Walter Kohn
- 2003 Pierre Encrenaz
- 2004 Christophe Salomon
- 2005 André Neveu
- 2006 Yves Couder
- 2007 Sébastien Balibar
- 2008 Stéphan Fauve
- 2009 Jean-Loup Puget
- 2010 Jean Dalibard
- 2011 Giorgio Parisi
- 2012 Françoise Combes
- 2013 Jean Iliopoulos
- 2014 François Biraben
- 2015 Bernard Derrida
- 2016 Vincent Croquette
- 2017 Michel Brune
- 2018 Edith Falgarone
- 2019 Vincent Hakim
- 2020 Bernard Placais
- 2021 Marc Mézard
- 2022 Frédéric Chevy
- 2023 Yves Pomeau
- 2024 Martine Ben Amar
- 2025 Pierre Le Doussal

== See also ==
- List of physics awards
