= Balian =

Balian or Balyan may refer to:

== People ==
- Balian of Ibelin (disambiguation), a name shared by several members of the Ibelin family from the crusader kingdoms of Jerusalem and Cyprus
- Balian Buschbaum (born 1980), German pole vaulter
- Roger Balian, 20th-century French physicist; co-creator of the Balian–Low theorem
- Balyan family, Ottoman Armenian family of court architects, 18th–19th century

== Southeast Asia ==
- Balian, another term for the babaylan shamans of the Philippines
- Balian, Balinese language term for a traditional healer

== Other uses ==
- Balian–Low theorem
