= Michel Gaudin =

Michel Gaudin may refer to:

- Martin-Michel-Charles Gaudin (1756–1841), French statesman
- Michel Gaudin (physicist) (1931–2023), French physicist
