= Philippe Di Francesco =

French-American mathematician

Philippe Di Francesco is a French-American mathematician, focusing in mathematical physics, physical combinatorics and integrable systems. He is senior researcher (Directeur de Recherche) at the Institute of Theoretical Physics, Saclay in France, and is currently the Morris and Gertrude Fine Distinguished Professor of Mathematics at University of Illinois Urbana-Champaign. He is also author of the book 'Conformal Field Theory'. He received his PhD in 1989, under Jean-Claude Le Guillou and Jean-Bernard Zuber, at the Pierre and Marie Curie University.

Di Francesco was elected as member of French Academy of Sciences in 2025.
