= IPHT =

IPHT or IPhT may refer to:

- IPHT Jena, Leibniz Institute of Photonic Technology in Germany
- IPhT Saclay, Institute of Theoretical Physics, Saclay in France
- Institute of Post‐Harvest Technology, a subsidiary of the Ministry of Agriculture (Sri Lanka)
