= Sylvain Liberman =

French physicist

Sylvain Liberman (1934 – 5 August 1988) was a French physicist, specializing in atomic physics and laser spectroscopy. He is known as the leader of the scientific team that made the first measurements of the optical spectrum of francium.

== Education and career ==
Sylvain Liberman received his doctorate in 1971 from Orsay's Paris-Sud University (Paris XI), which in 2020 was replaced by Paris-Saclay University. His dissertation is entitled Études de structures hyperfines et d'effets isotopiques dans les raies laser infrarouges de gaz rares (Studies of hyperfine structures and of isotopic effects generated by infrared lasers in spectrographic lines of noble gases). From 1971 until his death in 1988 he did research for the CNRS in Orsay and at the Laboratoire Aimé-Cotton (LAC). From 1981 until his death he was director of the Laboratoire Aimé-Cotton (which was jointly operated by the CNRS and the Paris-Sud University).

Liberman was involved in the development of a single-mode pulsed laser with excellent pointing stability. (Pointing stability is a measure (usually in mr or μr) of how much the laser beam position drifts from the target over time.) He and his colleagues developed an ultra-sensitive method for measuring optical resonances using either resonance ionization or deflections of atomic jets extracted from a magneto-optical trap. He also made contributions to the understanding of Rydberg states, spontaneous collective decays (superradiance, subradiance) and the hyperfine interaction of radioactive atoms, which he and his colleagues investigated at CERN using the ISOLDE facility. He and his colleagues found significant differences in nuclear properties from the study of hyperfine structure when studying isotopic families (such as cesium in the mass range 118 to 145 and potassium in the mass range 38 to 47). At CERN, he led the team credited with the first recording of a line of the optical spectrum of francium. Before that, francium was the only element with an atomic number below 100 for which no optical transition had been observed.

In 1985 he received the Prix des trois physiciens.

== Selected publications ==
=== Articles ===
- Liberman, Sylvain (1969). "Étude théorique des configurations 5p5(6s + 5d) et 5p 5(6p + 7p) du xénon I et de leur structure hyperfine". Journal de Physique. 30: 53–62. doi:10.1051/jphys:0196900300105300.
- Tuan, Duong Hong; Liberman, Sylvain; Pinard, Jacques (1976). "Detection and study of Rb I Rydberg states". Optics Communications. 18 (4): 533–535. Bibcode:1976OptCo..18..533T. doi:10.1016/0030-4018(76)90313-8.
- Liberman, S.; Pinard, J.; Taleb, A. (1983). "Experimental Study of Stimulated Radiative Corrections on an Atomic Rydberg State". Physical Review Letters. 50 (12): 888–891. Bibcode:1983PhRvL..50..888L. doi:10.1103/PhysRevLett.50.888.
- Pavolini, D.; Crubellier, A.; Pillet, P.; Cabaret, L.; Liberman, S. (1985). "Experimental Evidence for Subradiance". Physical Review Letters. 54 (17): 1917–1920. Bibcode:1985PhRvL..54.1917P. doi:10.1103/PhysRevLett.54.1917. PMID 10031175. 1985
- Crubellier, A.; Liberman, S.; Pavolini, D.; Pillet, P. (1985). "Superradiance and subradiance. I. Interatomic interference and symmetry properties in three-level systems". Journal of Physics B: Atomic and Molecular Physics. 18 (18): 3811–3833. Bibcode:1985JPhB...18.3811C. doi:10.1088/0022-3700/18/18/022. 1985
- Liberman, Sylvain (1986). "Study of Isotopes Far from the Stability Line by Sylvain Liberman". In Briand, Jean Pierre (ed.). Atoms in Unusual Situations. Nato ASI Series. Vol. 143. pp. 37–53. doi:10.1007/978-1-4757-9337-6_3. ISBN 978-1-4757-9339-0.

=== Books ===
- Balian, Roger; Haroche, Serge; Liberman, Sylvain, eds. (1977). Aux frontières de la spectroscopie laser= Frontiers in laser spectroscopy. Les Houches, session XXVII, 30 juin-26 juillet 1975. (lectures in English at the physics summer school in Les Houches)
