= Ampère Prize =

Annual prize awarded by the French Academy of Sciences

The Prix Ampère de l’Électricité de France is a scientific prize awarded annually by the French Academy of Sciences.

Founded in 1974 in honor of André-Marie Ampère to celebrate his 200th birthday in 1975, the award is granted to one or more French scientists for outstanding research work in mathematics or physics. The monetary award is 50,000 euro, funded by Électricité de France.

== Winners ==
- 2025 : Hubert Saleur and Jesper Jacobsen
- 2024 : Xavier Pennec
- 2023 : Philippe Grangier
- 2022 : Yann Brenier
- 2021 : Equipe géodynamo d'ISTerre
- 2020 : Guy David
- 2019 : Jacqueline Bloch
- 2018 : Frank Merle
- 2017 : Jean-François Joanny
- 2016 : Alain Brillet
- 2015 : Michel Fliess
- 2014 : Gilles Chabrier
- 2013 : Arnaud Beauville
- 2012 : Jean-Marc Chomaz
- 2011 : Daniel Maystre
- 2010 : Nicolas Nikolski
- 2009 : Ian Campbell
- 2008 : Gérard Iooss
- 2007 : Alfred Vidal-Madjar
- 2004, 2005, 2006 : Prize not awarded.
- 2003 : Gilles Lebeau
- 2002 : Massimo Salvatores
- 2001 : Bernard Derrida
- 2000 : Pierre Suquet
- 1999 : Yves Colin de Verdière
- 1998 : Michel Brune and Jean-Michel Raimond
- 1997 : Michèle Vergne
- 1996 : Cirano de Dominicis and Marc Mézard
- 1995 : Claude Itzykson
- 1994 : François David
- 1993 : Christophe Soulé
- 1992 : Pierre-Louis Lions
- 1991 : Michel Devoret and Daniel Esteve
- 1990 : Jean-Michel Bismut
- 1989 : Adrien Douady
- 1988 : Jules Horowitz
- 1987 : Michel Raynaud
- 1986 : Georges Slodzian
- 1985 : Haïm Brezis
- 1984 : Daniel Kastler
- 1983 : Claude Bouchiat, Marie-Anne Bouchiat and Lionel Pottier
- 1982 : Paul-André Meyer
- 1981 : Édouard Brézin, Jean Zinn-Justin
- 1980 : Alain Connes
- 1979 : Claude Cohen-Tannoudji
- 1978 : Pierre Cartier
- 1977 : Pierre-Gilles de Gennes
- 1976 : Jacques Dixmier
- 1975 : André Lagarrigue
- 1974 : Jean Brossel

== See also ==
- List of mathematics awards
- List of physics awards
- List of prizes named after people
