= Gérard Iooss =

French mathematician

- Born: 14 June 1944 (age 81); Charbonnier-les-Mines, Puy-de-Dôme, France
- Education: École polytechnique
- Occupation: Mathematician

Gérard Iooss (born 14 June 1944 in Charbonnier-les-Mines, Puy-de-Dôme) is a French mathematician, specializing in dynamical systems and mathematical problems of hydrodynamics.

== Education and career ==
Iooss attended school in Clermont-Ferrand and studied at the École Polytechnique from 1964 to 1966. From 1967 to 1972 he was with the Office National d'Etudes et de Recherches Aérospatiales (ONERA). In 1971 he received his doctorate from the Pierre and Marie Curie University (Paris 6) with thesis Théorie non linéaire de la stabilit des écoulements laminaires under the supervision of Jean-Pierre Guireaud. Iooss was a professor from 1972 to 1974 at the University of Paris-Sud in Orsay, and from 1974 at the University of Nice Sophia-Antipolis, where he retired in 2007. From 1994 to 2004 he was at the Institut Universitaire de France. He is today at the Laboratoire J. A. Dieudonné of the University of Nice. (The Laboratoire J. A. Diedonné is a unité mixte de recherche (UMR) of the CNRS.)

He was also from 1970 to 1985 Maître de conférences at the École Polytechnique.

He was a visiting professor at the University of Minnesota (1977/78), at the University of California, Berkeley (1978), and at the University of Stuttgart (1990, 1995, 1997), where he collaborated with Klaus Kirchgässner on reversible dynamical systems.

Iooss's research deals with functional analysis of the Navier-Stokes equation, nonlinear hydrodynamic stability theory and water waves of different kinds, and general behavior (such as symmetry breaking and normal forms) of bifurcations (branching of solutions) in dynamic systems. In 1971, independently of David H. Sattinger, he treated the Hopf bifurcation in solutions of the Navier-Stokes equation as an infinite dimensional dynamical system. He studied in particular the Couette flow (Taylor-Couette) and discovered there theoretically several waveforms, which were later confirmed experimentally. He collaborated with Alain Chenciner on bifurcation of invariant tori. Iooss, with Pierre Coullet, classified the instabilities of spatially periodic patterns in translation-invariant and mirror-symmetric systems.

Iooss was elected in 1990 a corresponding member of the Académie des sciences. In 1993 he received the Max-Planck-Forschungspreis. He received in 2008 the Prix Ampère and in 1978 the Prix Henri de Partille of the Académie des sciences.

In 1998 he was Invited Speaker with talk Traveling water waves as a paradigm for bifurcations in reversible infinite dimensional dynamical systems at the International Congress of Mathematicians in Berlin.

== Selected publications ==
=== Articles ===
- 1979 A.Chenciner, G.Iooss. Bifurcations de tores invariants. Arch. Rat. Mech. Anal. 69, 2, 109-198. doi:10.1007/bf00281175
- 1987 C.Elphick, E.Tirapegui, M.Brachet, P.Coullet, G.Iooss. A simple global characterization for normal forms of singular vector fields. Physica 29D, 95-127. doi:10.1016/0167-2789(87)90049-2
- 1990 P.Coullet, G.Iooss. Instabilities of one-dimensional cellular patterns. Phys. Rev. Lett. 64, 8, 866-869 doi:10.1103/PhysRevLett.64.866
- 1993 G.Iooss., M.C.Pérouème. Perturbed homoclinic solutions in reversible 1:1 resonance vector fields. J.Diff. Equ. 102, 1, 62-88.
- 2000 G.Iooss., K.Kirchgässner. Travelling waves in a chain of coupled nonlinear oscillators. Com. Math. Phys. 211, 439-464. doi:10.1007/s002200050821
- 2003 F.Dias, G.Iooss. Water-waves as a spatial dynamical system. Handbook of Mathematical Fluid Dynamics, chapter 10, 443-499. S.Friedlander, D.Serre, eds., Elsevier.
- 2005 G.Iooss, P.Plotnikov, J.F.Toland . Standing waves on an infinitely deep perfect fluid under gravity. Arch. Rat. Mech. Anal. 177, 3, 367-478. doi:10.1007/s00205-005-0381-6
- 2005 G.Iooss, E.Lombardi. Polynomial normal forms with exponentially small remainder for analytical vector fields. J.Diff. Equ. 212, 1-61. doi:10.1016/j.jde.2004.10.015
- 2011 G.Iooss, P.Plotnikov. Asymmetrical three-dimensional travelling gravity waves. (91p.) Arch. Rat. Mech. Anal. 200, 3 (2011), 789-880. doi:10.1007/s00205-010-0372-0
- 2019 B.Braaksma, G.Iooss. Existence of bifurcating quasipatterns in steady Bénard-Rayleigh convection. Arch. Rat. Mech. Anal. 231, 3 (2019), 1917-1981. doi:10.1007/s00205-018-1313-6

=== Books ===
- Bifurcation of Maps and Applications, North Holland Math Studies 36, 1979
- Elementary Stability and Bifurcation Theory, with D. Joseph, Springer Verlag, Undergraduate Texts in Mathematics, 1980, 2nd edition 1990, 2013 pbk reprint
- The Couette-Taylor Problem, Applied Mathematics Series 102, with P. Chossat, Springer Verlag 1994. 2012 pbk reprint
- Topics in Bifurcation Theory and Applications, Advanced Series in Nonlinear Dynamics, with Moritz Adelmeyer, World Scientific 1992, 2nd edition 1999
- Local bifurcations, center manifolds, and normal forms in infinite dimensional dynamical systems, with M. Haragus, EDP Sciences/Springer Verlag 2011
