= Alain Brillet =

French physicist (1947–2026)

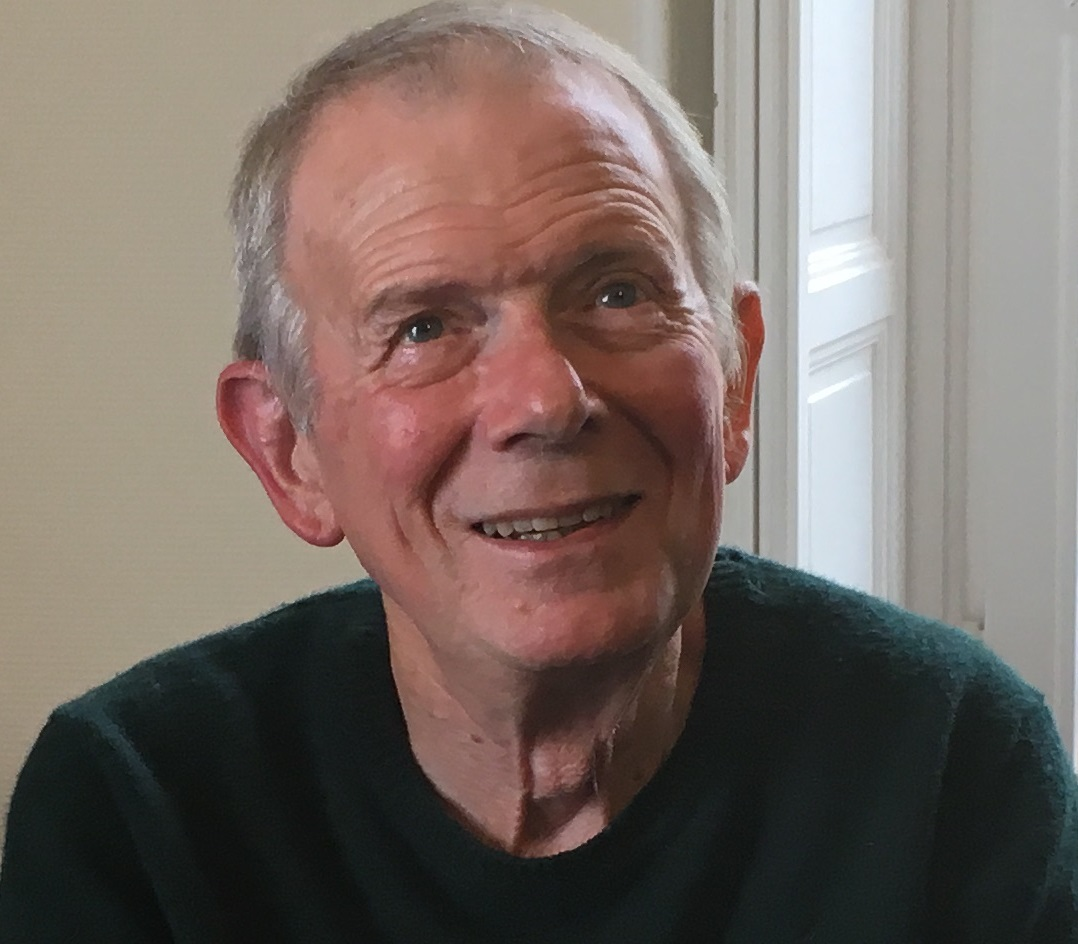
- Brillet in 2017
- Born: 30 March 1947; Saint-Germain-en-Laye, France
- Died: 20 March 2026 (aged 78); Nice, France
- Known for: Virgo interferometer
- Awards: Ampère Prize (2016); CNRS Gold Medal (2017)
- Scientific career
- Fields: Gravitational waves

Alain Brillet (French pronunciation: [alɛ̃ bʁijɛ]; 30 March 1947 – 20 March 2026) was a French physicist who specialised in gravitational wave detectors.

== Life and career ==
Alain Brillet was born on 30 March 1947. He graduated from the ESPCI Paris in 1970, following which he worked for the CNRS in Orsay during his Ph.D. thesis until 1976. He later worked in Boulder with John Hall, before returning to France in 1982. He was most famous for being one of the two fathers of the Virgo interferometer with Adalberto Giazotto, directing the consortium during its design and construction between 1989 and 2003.

He was awarded the Ampère Prize in 2016 and the CNRS Gold Medal in 2017 for his work on the Virgo detector.

Brillet died on 20 March 2026, at the age of 78.
