= Stéphan Fauve =

French physicist

- Born: 20 December 1955 (age 70); Paris
- Education: Paris-Panthéon-Assas University, Pierre and Marie Curie University
- Occupations: Physicist; university teacher; researcher
- Employers: École normale supérieure (1997–); École Normale Supérieure de Lyon (1987–1997)
- Awards: Lewis Fry Richardson Medal (2009); CNRS silver medal (2009); Three Physicists Prize
- Website: www.lps.ens.fr/recherche/physique-non-lineaire/Stephan.html

Stéphan Fauve (born 20 December 1955 in Paris) is a French physicist. He is a professor at the École normale supérieure (ENS) in Paris, a member of the ENS Physics Laboratory.

== Biography ==
Stéphan Fauve, is a graduate of the École normale supérieure de Saint-Cloud (1976–1980), agrégé de sciences physiques (1979) and docteur ès sciences (1984).

After defending his thesis in 1984 under the direction of Albert Libchaber as a preparatory associate at the École normale supérieure, Stephan Fauve was successively Professor at the École normale supérieure de Lyon (1987–1997), then at the ENS in Paris since 1997. He is a member of the French Academy of Sciences, Physics section.

== Scientific work ==
Stéphan Fauve's work has focused mainly on non-linear physics. His thesis work focused on the study of various scenarios of transition to chaos, in particular the measurement of critical exponents associated with the cascade of period doubling. He then carried out the first experiment to highlight the phenomenon of stochastic resonance. He was one of the founders of the physics laboratory of ENS-Lyon, initiating there the study of various research fields, such as dissipative structures generated by instability, granular media, sound propagation in complex media (effect of liquid-vapour transition on sound velocity and absorption in two-phase media), sound-vorticity interaction and its application to the detection of intermittent vortex structures in turbulence, the study of surface waves, which led to the first observation of a hydrodynamic quasi-crystalline pattern and wave turbulence. He initiated the VKS (von Karman Sodium) collaboration by proposing an experiment on the dynamo effect that led to the first laboratory observation of magnetic field reversal, with many similarities to the reversals of the Earth's magnetic field. He is currently interested in the statistical properties of large scales in turbulence and in modelling the quasi-biennial oscillation laboratory, i. e. the quasi-periodic wind reversals in the equatorial stratosphere.

== Distinctions ==
- Professor at the Institut Universitaire de France (junior) (1992–1997)
- IBM Physics Award (1993)
- "Batchelor lecturer" (Cambridge University (2004)
- Three Physicists Prize (2008)
- Lewis Fry Richardson Medal from the European Geosciences Union (2009)
- Silver medal from the CNRS (2009)
- CEA Prize, French Academy of Sciences (2009)
- Professor at the Institut Universitaire de France (senior) (2009)
- Member of the French Academy of Sciences (2011)
- Member of the Academia Europaea (2011)
