= Michel Soutif =

French physicist (1921-2016)

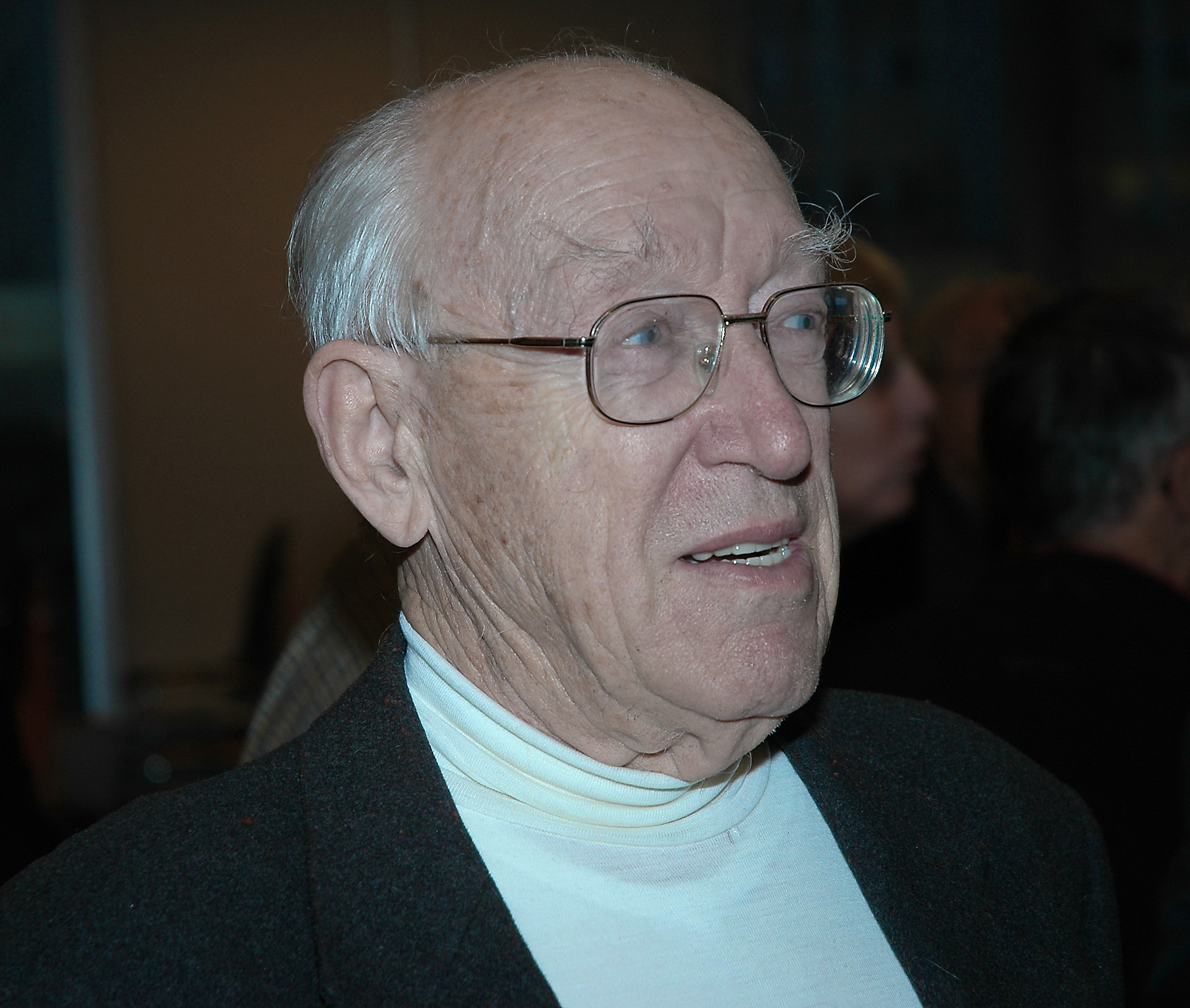
- Michel Soutif 2002 (photo S. Claisse, ILL)
- Born: Michel Soutif; 8 July 1921; Paris, France
- Died: 28 June 2016 (aged 94); Meylan, Isère, France.
- Education: Ecole Normale Supérieure, Paris
- Spouses: Jeanne Guicherd Ruth Haas (died 2015)
- Scientific career
- Fields: Physics

Michel Soutif (8 July 1921 – 28 June 2016), Officier de la Légion d’honneur, Grand Officier de l’ordre national du Mérite, Chevalier de l'Ordre National du Mali, was a French scientist and educator, known for his major contribution to the development of the University of Grenoble in the years following the Second World War. He is also known for his early work on nuclear magnetic resonance, centimetre wavelength radiation (microwaves) and electron spin resonance. He graduated from the Ecole Normale Supérieure (ENS), and, on completing his thesis, was invited by Louis Néel to a post at the University of Grenoble, where he established the Laboratoire de Spectrométrie Physique. Both men, Néel and Soutif, understood the importance of the relationship between industry and fundamental research, and of the consequent need to attract new industries to the surrounding region. Soutif's success in obtaining teaching posts and in reinforcing the discipline of physics at the University of Grenoble was remarkable. He is recognized not only for his scientific achievements but also for the outstanding clarity of his teaching and his mission to spread scientific reason. These were talents that, in the positions of responsibility and decision that he occupied during his career, propelled him to become one of the principal architects of the growth of the university.

== Upbringing and education ==
Michel Soutif was the son of Elise Baudoin and Edmond Soutif, assistant director at the Ministry of Finances, who was in charge of finances of the Paris hospitals.

Soutif was educated at the Lycée Michelet (Vanves). In preparation for the grandes écoles competition examinations, he subsequently attended the Lycée Saint-Louis, which, at the outbreak of World War II was evacuated to the Lycée des Filles in Tournon. Imprudently (in view of the consequences at that time of failing an entrance examination), and contrary to received practice, Soutif applied to only one of the grandes écoles, the ENS. He was successful, entering in 1942, and went on to graduate first out of his class.

Conditions in occupied Paris during the war were not easy, even dangerous, as many students at the ENS were active in the résistance. The Soutif family lived in an apartment in Boulevard St Michel, and Soutif's father was, not incorrectly, suspected of involvement. The climate of arbitrariness and uncertainty that prevailed during that period is illustrated by the fact that on returning from ENS one afternoon in 1944, the young Soutif was intercepted by the concièrge who warned him that the Gestapo was searching the family apartment and that he must stay out of sight. The Gestapo officer conducted his search of the rooms and his interrogation of Edmond Soutif, using as a support for his notes the folder taken from the writing desk in the apartment. Unable to discover incriminating evidence, they eventually left. But had he only opened the folder, the officer would have found the letters that would certainly have condemned to death not only Soutif's family but also their correspondents. The event served to strengthen Soutif's conviction at the end of the war of the need for peace and collaboration between the nations.

During his doctoral thesis at the ENS, Michel Soutif founded the high-frequency laboratory SACM (societé alsacienne de constructions mécaniques), later to become Alcatel. With the help of the Centre national d'études des télécommunications (CNET) he built the first Hertzian telephone link connecting Mount Boron, (Nice) with Corsica. From these beginnings in 1948, upon Soutif's arrival in the general physics laboratory in Grenoble, a branch of Alcatel dedicated to research into centimetre wavelength radiation was established there. Its generous financing enabled the purchase of a substantial part of the scientific equipment for all the groups in what was later to become the Laboratoire de Spectrométrie Physique.

The invitation extended to Soutif by Néel in 1951 to come to Grenoble was a response to the loss to science in France of the time and the resources that the war had wasted, and to the urgency of enlarging research into the properties of matter through the widest range of possible techniques. On his arrival in Grenoble, Soutif found little equipment in the general physics laboratory but succeeded in recovering an electromagnet from Bordeaux that, inconveniently, required a high current. For the power supply, batteries were salvaged from a captured German submarine and he was then faced with the problem of finding an electrical generator to recharge them. Through improvisation and persuasion, as well as with the help of special funding from the Ministry of Education, he was able to build up a viable laboratory in the following years and attract young research workers recently graduated from the ENS. In 1958 he became head of the General Physics Laboratory. The Laboratoire de Spectrométrie Physique] (later to become the Laboratoire Interdisciplinaire de Physique), was founded in 1966.

Following the university reform act of Edgar Faure of November 1968, the University of Grenoble was split into its constituent faculties. Soutif succeeded in convincing the Dean of the Medical Faculty, Guy Cabanel, of the pertinence of advanced instrumentation in medicine, and of the rationale for merging with the Faculty of Science. Out of this merger arose the Université Scientifique et Médicale de Grenoble. Soutif was also instrumental in the expansion of physics teaching both in Grenoble and at the Centre Universitaire de Savoie in Chambery. In 1971 he was elected president of the Université Scientifique et Médicale de Grenoble. He encouraged the staff of his laboratory to participate in the Franco-German high flux reactor Institut Laue-Langevin project under construction at the same time on the opposite side of Grenoble that was inspired by Louis Néel and Erwin Felix Lewy-Berthaut from Grenoble, and Heinz Maier-Leibnitz from the Technische Hochschule München, Germany. This international institute, of which Great Britain later became an associate, was to prove a major driving force in the scientific development of Grenoble. During this period, Soutif, with his vision of the importance of new industries, persuaded William Hewlett, a personal friend, to establish an industrial research unit of Hewlett Packard near Grenoble. In a Franco-German project for a European millimetre wavelength interferometer telescope he offered to build its base laboratory, the Institut de Radioastronomie Millimétrique, on the campus of Grenoble University. The choice of site for the telescope, the Plateau de Bure Interferometer at 2550 m altitude situated only 60 km from Grenoble followed naturally. In the 1980s a major new scientific player entered the Grenoble scene: the European Synchrotron Radiation Facility (ESRF), which produced its first X-ray beams in 1992. The original decision had been made to locate this powerful light source in Strasbourg. Soutif played an important role in presenting the scientific case to the political authorities, notably Louis Mermaz, to reconsider in favor of Grenoble. The latter choice was finally confirmed by the President of the Republic, François Mitterrand. Michel Soutif, mandated to gauge the opinion of the President of the German Republic on this matter, met with a favorable response.

After his retirement, Soutif turned his attention to the history and the development of science, authoring several books on the contribution of Asia, and particularly of China. Between 2004 and 2006 Michel Soutif was president of the Académie Delphinale, a scientific society based in Isère. Until the end of his life he taught at the Université inter-âge du Dauphiné, where several of his lectures are available online.

== Publications ==
La Spectroscopie hertzienne, Dunod (1960).

Physique neutronique, Presses Universitaires de France (1962).

Vibrations, Propagation, Diffusion, Dunod Université (1970).

L'Asie, source de sciences et de techniques, EDP Sciences (1995).

Naissance de la physique, de la Sicile à la Chine, EDP Sciences (2002).

Grenoble, carrefour des sciences et de l'industrie, Collection Les Patrimoines – édition Dauphiné Libéré (2005)

Fondements des civilisations de l'Asie, EDP Sciences – Collection: Sciences et Histoire (2009).

Naissance et diffusion de la physique, EDP Sciences (2014).

== Prizes ==
Robin Prize of the Société française de physique (1966)

Three Physicists Prize of the Ecole Normale Supérieure (1979)

Grand prix de la coopération scientifique Franco-chinoise de la République populaire de Chine (2004)

Villemot Prize of the Académie des sciences. (2004)
