= Pascale Senellart =

French physicist (born 1972)

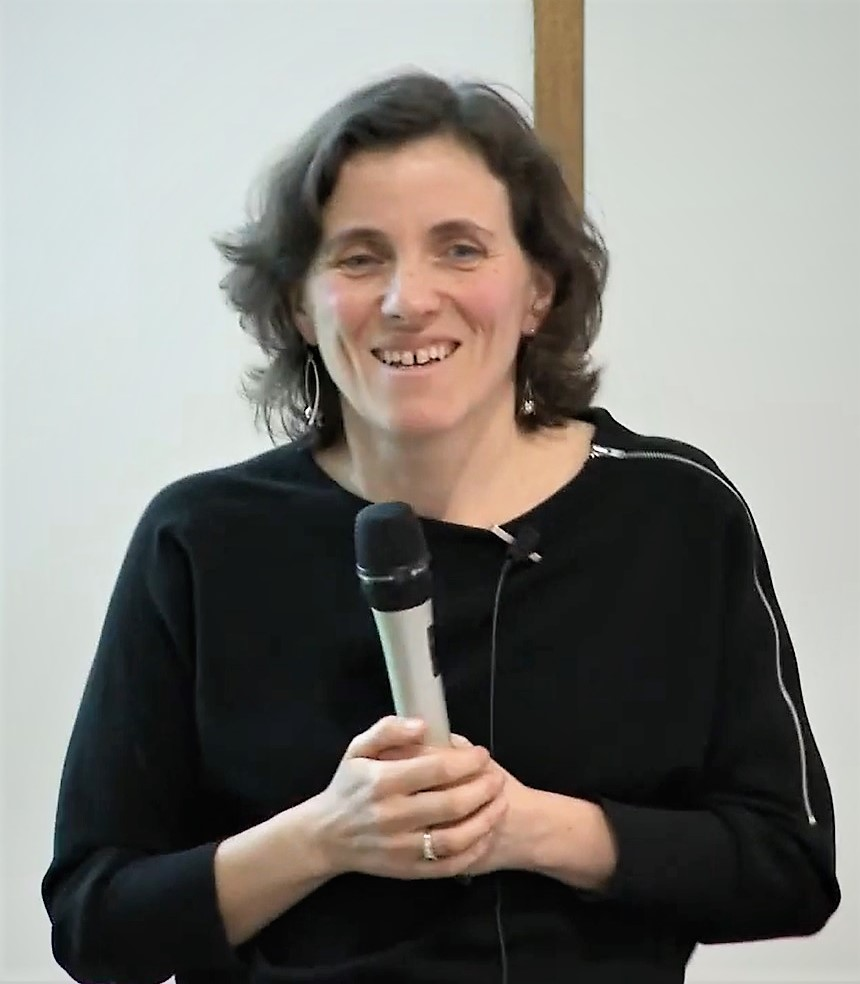
- Senellart speaks in 2019
- Born: Pascale Mardon; August 21, 1972 (age 54)
- Education: École Polytechnique; Pierre and Marie Curie University
- Scientific career
- Thesis: Etude de l'émission non-linéaire de microcavités à base de semi-conducteurs III-V en régime de couplage fort (2001)

Pascale Senellart (born August 21, 1972) is a French physicist who is a senior researcher at the French National Centre for Scientific Research and professor at the École Polytechnique. She has worked on quantum light sources and semiconductor physics. She was awarded the CNRS Silver Medal in 2014, made Fellow of The Optical Society in 2018, and elected member of the French Academy of Sciences in 2022.

== Early life and education ==
Senellart was born in Corbeil-Essonnes. She attended the École Polytechnique as an undergraduate student. She moved to the Pierre and Marie Curie University for her graduate studies, where she studied non-linear emission from semiconductor microcavities. In 2001, Senellart joined the French National Centre for Scientific Research (CNRS).

== Research and career ==
Senellart has been at the French National Centre for Scientific Research since 2001. When she joined the CNRS she started working in quantum electrodynamics, with a particular focus on semiconductor quantum dots. She developed a novel methodology to control the coupling between a quantum dot and a microcavity. In 2011, she was made a senior researcher and awarded an ERC Starting Grant. Based on her microcavity designs, Senellart founded the spin-off company Quandela, which develops single photon light sources.

== Awards and honours ==
- 2014 CNRS Silver Medal
- 2014 Ordre national du Mérite
- 2018 Elected Fellow of The Optical Society
- 2021 Recipient of the grand prix Mergier-Bourdeix of the French Académie des sciences
- 2022 Elected member of the French Academy of Sciences
- 2023 Prix Jean Ricard by the French Society of Physics

== Selected publications ==
- Peter E; Pascale Senellart; David Martrou; Aristide Lemaitre; Hours J; Jean-Michel Gérard; Bloch J (1 August 2005). "Exciton-photon strong-coupling regime for a single quantum dot embedded in a microcavity". Physical Review Letters. 95 (6) 067401. arXiv:quant-ph/0411076. doi:10.1103/physrevlett.95.067401. ISSN 0031-9007. PMID 16090987. Wikidata Q59476809.
- N. Somaschi; V. Giesz; L. De Santis; et al. (7 March 2016). "Near-optimal single-photon sources in the solid state". Nature Photonics. 10 (5): 340–345. arXiv:1510.06499. doi:10.1038/nphoton.2016.23. ISSN 1749-4885. Wikidata Q62273742.
- Adrien Dousse; Jan Suffczyński; Alexios Beveratos; et al. (1 July 2010). "Ultrabright source of entangled photon pairs". Nature. 466 (7303): 217–220. doi:10.1038/nature09148. ISSN 1476-4687. PMID 20613838. Wikidata Q51612003.

== Personal life ==
Senellart is married with three children.
