= Lenka Zdeborová =

Czech physics researcher

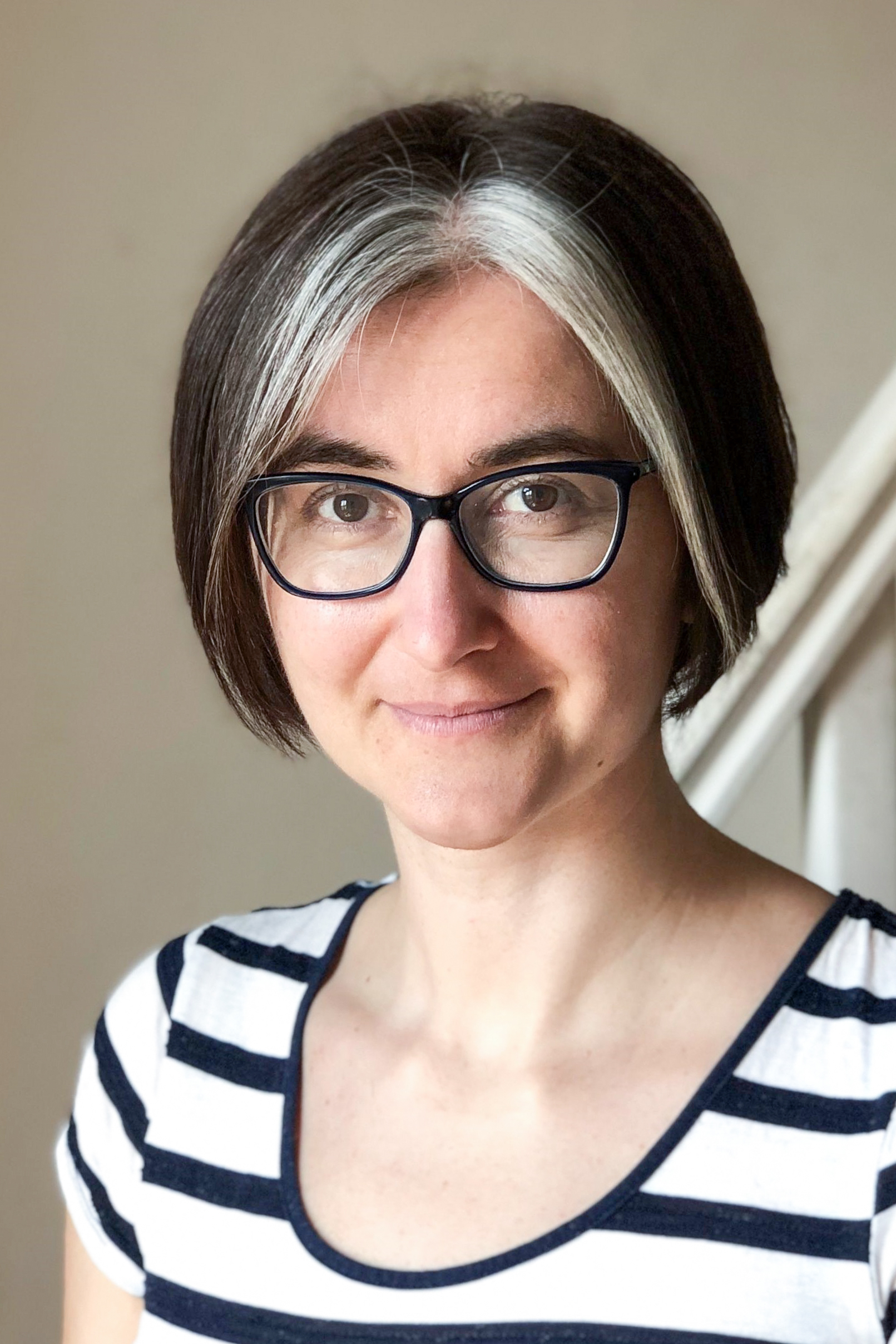
- Lenka Zdeborová in 2020
- Born: November 24, 1980 (age 45)
- Awards: CNRS Bronze medal (2014); Philippe Meyer prize Irène Joliot-Curie Prize

Academic background
- Education: Physics
- Alma mater: Charles University; Paris-Sud University
- Doctoral advisor: Václav Janiš; Marc Mézard

Academic work
- Discipline: Physics
- Sub-discipline: Theoretical physics
- Institutions: École Polytechnique Fédérale de Lausanne (EPFL)
- Main interests: Machine learning constraint satisfaction problems Statistical physics
- Website: https://people.epfl.ch/lenka.zdeborova/?lang=en

Lenka Zdeborová (born 24 November 1980) is a Czech physicist and computer scientist who applies methods from statistical physics to machine learning and constraint satisfaction problems. She is a professor of physics and computer science and communication systems at EPFL (École Polytechnique Fédérale de Lausanne).

== Life ==
Zdeborová was born in Plzeň and attended a local grammar school where she excelled in math and physics. After living in France with her family and working at the Centre National de la Recherche Scientifique (CNRS), she and her partner moved to Switzerland in 2020. They are currently raising their two children there.

== Education and career ==
Zdeborová earned a master's degree in physics at Charles University in 2004, and 2008, completed an international dual doctorate ("en cotutelle") at both Charles University and University of Paris-Sud. Her doctoral advisors were Václav Janiš at Charles University, and Marc Mézard at Paris-Sud.

After postdoctoral research at the Center for Nonlinear Studies of Los Alamos National Laboratory, she became a researcher for the French Centre National de la recherche scientifique (CNRS) in 2010, posted at the French Alternative Energies and Atomic Energy Commission's Institut de physique théorique - IPhT Saclay in Paris-Saclay. She also earned a habilitation in 2015 at the École normale supérieure (Paris). After receiving her habilitation, she undertook a research fellowship in Los Alamos, New Mexico. Since 2020, she has been working at EPFL (École Polytechnique Fédérale de Lausanne) as an Associate Professor of physics, and of computer science and communication systems in the Schools of Basic Sciences and of Computer and Communication Sciences (IC), and is the head of Laboratory of Statistical Physics of Computation.

== Recognition ==
Zdeborová won the CNRS Bronze medal in 2014. In 2016, the École Normale supérieure (Paris) gave her the Philippe Meyer Prize in theoretical physics for her work in Statistical Physics of Disordered Systems. She is the 2018 winner of the Irène Joliot-Curie Prize for young female scientists earned by standing out throughout her career.. She was also received the Josiah Willard Gibbs Lectureship of the American Mathematics Society and gave her Gibbs lecture in 2021. In 2022, she was awarded the Alternative Fields Medal.
