= Save the Climate =

French organization

Save The Climate (Sauvons le Climat) is a French association created in 2004 by Hervé Nifenecker, Roger Balian, Rémy Carle and Bernard Lerouge. In May 2012, five associations are members and thousands of people have signed its manifesto.

Its purpose is to fight against global warming and provide public information on topics fundamental to sustainable development, the environment, and energy, through eliminating the use of fossil fuels in France by maintaining the share of nuclear power generation in parallel with the use of "heat-like" renewable energy.

The association is approved by the French government as a combination of popular education.

== Activities and key dates ==
In 2010, Save the Climate's transparency score is 9 out of 10 in the barometer of NGO transparency achieved by the French Prometheus Foundation. According to the 2010 Transparency Barometer non-governmental organizations, the organization of the association class in twelfth position of 107 NGOs evaluated.

In 2011, Save the Climate communicates extensively with its energy scenario NEGATEP tale control emissions of greenhouse gases (GHG), which is based primarily on energy efficiency and replacing fossil fuels with renewable sources of heat electricity and hydraulic and nuclear, specificity due to the historical particular the generation of energy in France.

In 2012, a scientific explanation was completed and coherent arguments supported continuously for eight years by the association on the role of carbon dioxide in increasing the greenhouse effect is natural was published by an independent source. and relayed by the press. The association, represented by its President Jaques Masurel, participated in the conference on the transition energy organized by the French government on 14–15 September 2012.

== Media ==
- Article "Réaffirmer l'exigence de transparence, par Jacques Masurel, président du collectif SLC – Sauvons Le Climat", L'Humanité, 7 June 2012.
- Gérard Pierre's conference: "Que restera-t-il sur la Terre dans 50 ans?", Le Petit Journal, a weekly local Catalan No. 280, 6 April 2012.
- Interview of Gérard Pierre: "Prendre soin de la Terre avec Sauvons le climat", Le Bien Public, 31 August 2011.
- Interview of Hervé Nifenecker, Honorary chairman of SLC, l'Expansion
- Brochure "Comment réduire (vraiment) les émissions de gaz à effet de serre" by SLC/Sauvons le Climat
- Symposium about clean cars co-organized in 2009 by SLC and Confrontations Europe

== See also ==
- Nuclear power debate
- Climate change

== Bibliography ==
- Quel modèle énergétique pour l'Europe en 2030?, Actes de la 4ème université d'été, Aubin Editeur – Association Sauvons Le Climat, 201. ISBN 9 782361 110178.
