= Boltzmann Medal =

Physics award

The Boltzmann Medal (or Boltzmann Award) is a prize awarded to physicists that obtain new results concerning statistical mechanics; it is named after the celebrated physicist Ludwig Boltzmann. The Boltzmann Medal is awarded once every three years by the Commission on Statistical Physics of the International Union of Pure and Applied Physics, during the STATPHYS conference.

The award consists of a gilded medal; its front carries the inscription Ludwig Boltzmann, 1844–1906.

== Recipients ==
All the winners are influential physicists or mathematicians whose contribution to statistical physics have been relevant in the past decades. Institution with multiple recipients are Sapienza University of Rome (3) and École Normale Supérieure, Cornell University, University of Cambridge and Princeton University (2).

The Medal cannot be awarded to a scientist who already has been a laureate of a Nobel Prize. Three recipients of the Boltzmann Medal have gone on to win the Nobel Prize in Physics: Kenneth G. Wilson (1982), Giorgio Parisi (2021) and John Hopfield (2024).

Year	Laureates	Institution	For
1975	Kenneth G. Wilson	Cornell University	
1977	Ryogo Kubo	University of Tokyo	"his work in the field of fluctuation theory."
1980	Rodney J. Baxter	Australian National University	
1983	Michael E. Fisher	University of Maryland, College Park	
1986	David Ruelle	Institut des Hautes Études Scientifiques	
1986	Yakov G. Sinai	Moscow State University	
1989	Leo Kadanoff	University of Chicago	
1992	Joel Lebowitz	Rutgers University	"his many important contributions to equilibrium and nonequilibrium statistical mechanics and for his leadership role in the statistical physics community."
1992	Giorgio Parisi	Sapienza University of Rome	"his fundamental contributions to statistical physics, and particularly for his solution of the mean field theory of spin glasses."
1995	Sam F. Edwards	University of Cambridge	
1998	Elliott Lieb	Princeton University	
1998	Benjamin Widom	Cornell University	"his illuminating studies of the statistical mechanics of fluids and fluid mixtures and their interfacial properties, especially his clear and general formulation of scaling hypotheses for the equation of state and surface tensions of fluids near critical points."
2001	Berni Alder	University of California at Davis	"inventing the technique of molecular dynamics simulation and showing that with such 'computer experiments' important discoveries in the field of statistical mechanics can be made, in particular the melting/crystallization transition of hard spheres and the long-time decay of autocorrelation functions in fluids."
2001	Kyozi Kawasaki	Chubu University	"contribution to our understanding of dynamic phenomena in condensed matter systems, in particular the mode-coupling theory of fluids near criticality, and nonlinear problems, such as critical phenomena in sheared fluids and phase separation kinetics."
2004	E.G.D. Cohen	Rockefeller University	"fundamental contributions to nonequilibrium statistical mechanics, including the development of a theory of transport phenomena in dense gases, and the characterization of measures and fluctuations in non-equilibrium stationary states."
2004	H. Eugene Stanley	Boston University	"influential contributions to several areas of statistical physics, including the theory of phase transitions and critical phenomena in spin systems and the percolation problem, and the application of these ideas to interpret the anomalous properties of liquid water."
2007	Kurt Binder	University of Mainz	
2007	Giovanni Gallavotti	Sapienza University of Rome	
2010	John Cardy	University of Oxford	
2010	Bernard Derrida	École Normale Supérieure	
2013	Giovanni Jona-Lasinio	Sapienza University of Rome	"his seminal contributions to spontaneous symmetry breaking in particle physics and the theory of non-equilibrium fluctuations."
2013	Harry Swinney	University of Texas at Austin	"his ingenious and challenging experiments which have had a large impact on many areas of statistical physics."
2016	Daan Frenkel	University of Cambridge	"seminal contributions to the statistical-mechanical understanding of the kinetics, self-assembly and phase behaviour of soft matter."
2016	Yves Pomeau	University of Arizona and École Normale Supérieure	"key contributions to the Statistical Physics of non-equilibrium phenomena in general. And, in particular, for developing our modern understanding of fluid mechanics, instabilities, pattern formation and chaos."
2019	Herbert Spohn	Technical University of Munich	"his wide-ranging and highly influential work in non-equilibrium statistical physics."
2022	Deepak Dhar	Tata Institute of Fundamental Research	"his seminal contributions in the field of statistical physics, including exact solutions of self-organised criticality models, interfacial growth, universal long-time relaxation in disordered magnetic systems, exact solutions in percolation and cluster counting problems and definition of spectral dimension of fractals."
2022	John J. Hopfield	Princeton University	"extending the boundaries of statistical physics to encompass the phenomena of life, from kinetic proofreading in the transmission of information at the molecular level to the dynamics of neural networks creating a new language for thinking about computation in the brain."
2025	Mehran Kardar	MIT	"groundbreaking contributions to non-equilibrium statistical physics, especially for the celebrated Kardar–Parisi–Zhang equation, the successful application of stochastic field theory to surface growth and for demonstrating the relevance of the equation to a diversity of phenomena."
2025	Yoshiki Kuramoto	Kyoto University	"groundbreaking work on non-equilibrium systems, especially nonlinear oscillations, synchronization, and weak turbulence. Professor Kuramoto’s work on spatially extended chaos resulting in the celebrated Kuramoto–Sivashinsky equation laid the ground for further development of nonlinear science applied across a wide range of disciplines. The Kuramoto model established the scientific field of coupled oscillators, a vibrant area of nonlinear science and complex systems with profound connections to statistical physics."

== See also ==
- List of physics awards
