= Balian of Ibelin (disambiguation) =

Balian of Ibelin (or Barisan the Younger; c. 1143–1193), sometimes known as Balian II, was the 3rd Lord of Ibelin (1170–1193) and protagonist of the 2005 movie Kingdom of Heaven.

Balian of Ibelin may also refer to:

- Barisan of Ibelin, sometimes known as Balian I or the Elder (died 1150), founder of the Ibelin family
- Balian of Beirut (also Balian III, died 1247), Lord of Beirut (1236–1247)
- Balian of Arsuf (1239–1277), Lord of Arsuf (1258–c. 1261)
- Balian of Ibelin (1240–1302), seneschal of the crusader kingdom of Cyprus
- Balian of Ibelin, Prince of Galilee and Bethlehem, son of Philip of Ibelin (died 1304)

== See also ==
- Balian (disambiguation)
