= Michel Gaudin (physicist) =

French physicist (1931–2023)

Michel Gaudin (2 December 1931 – 4 August 2023) was a French physicist, known for the Gaudin model, in which a central spin is coupled to many surrounding spins.

== Biography ==
Michel Gaudin was born on 2 December 1931. After graduating with the degree of ingénieur des ponts et chaussées (civil engineer), Gaudin joined in 1956 the CEA in Saclay to work on neutron experiments. Two years later, he joined Claude Bloch's theorists' working group, to which he belonged for the rest of his career. In 1967 he received from the University of Paris-Sud in Orsay his doctoral degree in physics with thesis Étude d'un modèle à une dimension pour un système de fermions en interaction. Gaudin's research deals with, among other topics, the quantum-mechanical description of many-body systems, in particular, spin systems.

With M. L. Mehta in 1960 he published On the density of eigenvalues of a random matrix, an important paper on random matrices.

Gaudin received the Fondation Saintour Prize, awarded every two years since 1889 by the Collège de France. In 2019, he received, with two other physicists, the Dannie Heineman Prize for Mathematical Physics from the American Physical Society.

Gaudin died on 4 August 2023, at the age of 91.

== Publications ==
- M. Gaudin, Modèles exactement résolus , EDP Sciences (1996) ISBN 2-86883-264-4.
- M. Gaudin, La Fonction d'onde de Bethe , Masson, Paris (1983) ISBN 2-225-79607-6.
  - The Bethe wavefunction. Cambridge University Press. 2014. ISBN 9781107045859; translated by Jean-Sébastien Caux
