= Hubert Saleur =

French-American theoretical physicist

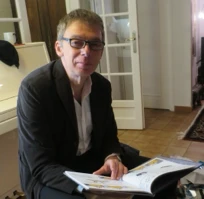
- Saleur in 2020
- Born: December 28, 1960 (age 65); Aix-en-Provence, France
- Education: Pierre and Marie Curie University
- Scientific career
- Fields: Theoretical physics
- Workplaces: University of Southern California, Institute of Theoretical Physics, Saclay

Hubert Saleur (born December 28, 1960 in Aix-en-Provence, France) is a French-American theoretical physicist. He has worked on quantum field theories and their applications to condensed matter physics and statistical mechanics. He has received recognition from the French Physical Society for his contributions to the study of phase transitions in disordered quantum systems and transport problems in nanophysics, and by the French National Center for Scientific Research for his contributions to conformal field theory. His work includes the exact determination of critical exponents in two-dimensional percolation.

== Education ==
Saleur was a student at École Normale Supérieure de Lyon (formerly St Cloud) from 1981 to 1985, and earned a Ph.D. in physics from Université Paris 6 in 1987.

== Career ==
From 1986 to 1990, Saleur worked as a CNRS research associate at Service de Physique Théorique (Saclay, France) (currently Institute of Theoretical Physics, Saclay). From 1991 to 1992 he worked at Yale University, first as an assistant professor and then as an associate professor. He has been affiliated with University of Southern California (USC) since 1993, first as an associate professor and later, since 1996, as professor of physics and mathematics (currently on leave). He has also been a member of the Caltech - USC Center for Theoretical Physics between 1999 and 2002, and has been an international director of research at the Institute of Theoretical Physics, Saclay since 2004.

== Honors and awards ==
- 1987 – Doisteau Blutel Prize of the French Academy of Sciences (with Bertrand Duplantier)
- 1987 – Bronze Medal of the French National Center for Scientific Research.
- 1991 – David and Lucile Packard Fellowship
- 1993 – National Young Investigator Award, U.S. National Science Foundation
- 2001 – Humboldt Senior Research Award (Germany)
- 2011 – Silver Medal of the French National Center for Scientific Research
- 2015 – Advanced Research Grant, European Research Council (ERC)
- 2019 – Jean Ricard Grand Prize of the French Physical Society
- 2025 – Ampère Prize

== Selected publications ==
- V. Pasquier & H. Saleur (1990), Common structures between finite systems and conformal field theories through quantum groups, Nuclear Physics B 330 (2-3), 523–556
- H. Saleur & B. Duplantier (1987), Exact determination of the percolation hull exponent in two dimensions, Physical Review Letters 58 (22), 2325
- B. Duplantier & H. Saleur (1987), Exact tricritical exponents for polymers at the Θ-point in two dimensions, Physical Review Letters 59 (5), 539
- P. Fendley, A. W. W. Ludwig & H. Saleur (1995), Exact conductance through point contacts in the ν = 1/3 fractional quantum Hall effect, Physical Review Letters 74 (15), 3005
- P. Fendley, A. W. W. Ludwig & H. Saleur (1995), Exact nonequilibrium transport through point contacts in quantum wires and fractional quantum Hall devices, Physical Review B 52 (12), 8934
