= Jean-Bernard Zuber =

French theoretical physicist

- Education: École Polytechnique
- Known for: Quantum field theory
- Scientific career
- Fields: Physics
- Workplaces: Saclay Nuclear Research Centre, Sorbonne Université
- Thesis: Les champs de Yang-Mills et la diffusion des mésons pseudoscalaires (1974)
- Doctoral advisor: Jean Zinn-Justin

Jean-Bernard Zuber is a French theoretical physicist.

== Education ==
Zuber studied at the École polytechnique from 1966 to 1968 and then as a CNRS researcher at the theoretical physics department of the Nuclear Research Center in Saclay. In 1974, he received his doctorate from Jean Zinn-Justin at the University of Paris-Sud in Orsay.

== Career ==
From 1975 to 2004 he was in the same capacity as an engineer of the French Alternative Energies and Atomic Energy Commission at the Institute of Theoretical Physics, Saclay and at the same time (1995 through 1998) Professor at the Paris Diderot University. From 1995 to 2000 he was the chairman of the CNRS section of theoretical physics. Since 2004 he has been a professor at the Pierre and Marie Curie University, (now Sorbonne Université), Emeritus professor since 2014, and between 2005 and 2013 he has been director of the Fédération de Recherches Interactions Fondamentales (FRIF).

Zuber is author of a standard work on quantum field theory (QFT) with Claude Itzykson, with whom he often collaborated. In addition to applications of QFT in elementary particle physics, it also deals with statistical mechanics, for example the Ising model, and in particular with conformal field theories, random matrices and matrix integrals including applications in combinatorics and knot theory.

== Awards ==
In 1989 he received the Prix Dostaut-Blutet of the French Academy of Sciences and in 1991 the Prix Paul Langevin of the French Physical Society. Since 1999 he has been a Chevalier des Palmes Academiques.

== Selected publications ==
- with Claude Itzykson: Quantum Field Theory, McGraw Hill 1980, Dover 2005
- Editor with Itzykson, Saleur: Conformal invariance and applications to statistical mechanics, World Scientific 1988
- Editor with Raymond Stora : Recent Advances in Field Theory and Statistical Mechanics, Les Houches Summer School Volume 39, 1982, North Holland 1984
- Editor with Jean-Michel Drouffe: The mathematical beauty of physics-a memorial volume for Claude Itzykson, World Scientific 1997
- Editor with Cécile DeWitt-Morette : Quantum field theory: perspective and prospective (Les Houches 1998), Kluwer 1999 ISBN 0-7923-5672-1
- Zuber J.-B., Thèse d'Etat, Université Paris XI, 28 janvier 1974, "Les champs de Yang-Mills et la diffusion des mésons pseudoscalaires"
