= Michel Davier =

French physicist

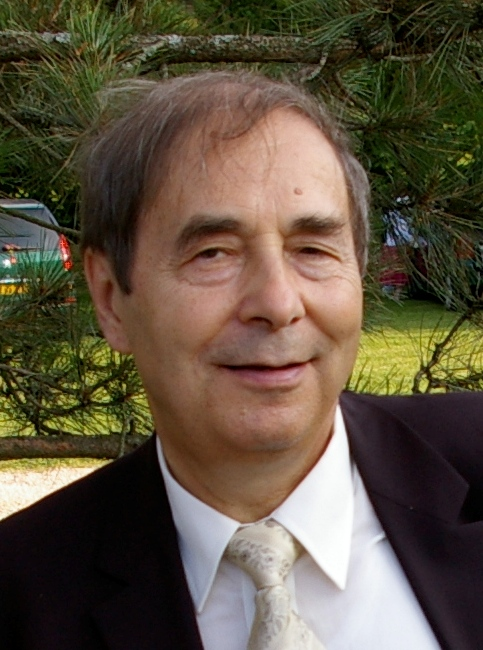
Image of Davier

Michel Davier (born 6 March 1942) is a French physicist.

Graduate of the École normale supérieure de Saint-Cloud (science), he was Director of the Laboratory of Linear Accelerator in Orsay from 1985 to 1994. Winner of the Gentner-Kastler Prize in 1994, he was elected a member of the French Academy of Sciences (Physics section) in 1996. He was appointed senior member of the Institut universitaire de France in 1991 for a five-year term, renewed in 1996.

He has been teaching physics since 1975 at the Paris-Sud University at the Centre scientifique d'Orsay.

== Biography ==
Originally from Ambérieu-en-Bugey (Ain), Michel Davier studied at the Lycée Lalande in Bourg-en-Bresse, at the École Normale d'instituteurs in the same city, and then at the École Normale d'instituteurs in Lyon. After a year of preparatory classes at the Lycée Chaptal in Paris in 1960–61, he entered the École normale supérieure de Saint-Cloud where he obtained a degree in physics and chemistry. Admitted to the first agrégation in physics in 1965, he chose to focus on higher education and research in elementary particle physics. Having joined the Laboratory of Linear Accelerator (LAL) founded in Orsay by the École Normale Supérieure as an assistant at the University of Paris-Sud, he did his doctoral work on the photoproduction of vector mesons at Stanford University in California at the Stanford Linear Accelerator Center (SLAC), which he defended in 1969 in Orsay. After a two-year stay at the European Centre for Nuclear Research (CERN) in Geneva, he joined Stanford University and SLAC as an assistant professor, then associate professor in 1973 where he conducted hadronic diffusion experiments. He returned to France in 1975 to take up the professorship left vacant by the untimely death of André Lagarrigue. He launched a research program on electron-positron annihilation at the highest energies available at the PETRA collider installed at the DESY laboratory in Hamburg. He is one of the founders of the ALEPH experiment that continues this research at CERN on the LEP collider from 1989, providing precision measurements that will establish the Standard Model of Fundamental Interactions. In 2001, he joined the international collaboration that operates the BABAR detector at SLAC to launch an original precision measurement program. In parallel with his activities in particle physics, he strongly supports the Franco-Italian Virgo project for the research of gravitational waves and welcomed Alain Brillet's team to the LAL in 1991. He actively participates in the construction of the interferometer and data analysis by creating his own group.

He directed the Linear Accelerator Laboratory from 1985 to 1993. Senior member of the Institut Universitaire de France since 1991, corresponding member of the French Academy of Sciences in 1994, he was elected member in 1996. He has been a member of numerous international scientific councils: SLAC (Stanford), LAL (Orsay), CERN (Geneva), DESY (Hamburg), LNF (Frascati), IHEP (Beijing), KEK (Tokyo), APPEC (Europe), LIGO (Caltech, MIT, Hanford, Livingston), Scientific Guidelines Committee (SPC, CERN), National Committee and CNRS Scientific Council (2001–05), Helmholtz Gemeinschaft (Berlin).

The dual aspect of university education, at the University of Paris-Sud, the École Normale Supérieure and the École Polytechnique, and the training of young researchers represents an important investment in Michel Davier's career. He has actively supervised many doctoral theses. In this field, he has maintained a privileged relationship with China since 1988 through close collaboration with the Institute of High Energy Physics (IHEP, Beijing), for the training of Chinese doctoral students and postdoctoral fellows in Orsay, many of whom are now professors and scientific leaders in China.

== Scientific works ==
Michel Davier's research has led to significant advances in the physics of strong and electroweak interactions through the construction and operation of large detectors, CELLO in Hamburg, ALEPH at CERN and BABAR at SLAC:

- Demonstration of electroweak interference for the electron, muon and lepton tau (universality of couplings).
- Precision tests of the Electroweak Standard Model, in particular by accurately measuring the polarization of the tau lepton by an optimal method, allowing an indirect determination of the mass of the Higgs boson, in accordance with the direct measurement at the LHC.
- Study of the lepton tau: clarification of disintegration modes, measurement of spectral functions and precise tests of quantum chromodynamics (determination of the variation of the strong coupling with energy between the mass of the tau and that of the boson Z in accordance with the property of "asymptotic freedom").
- Evaluation of hadronic contributions to vacuum polarization, in particular for the calculation of the magnetic moment of the muon. The observation of a deviation at 3.6 standard deviations between the theoretical prediction and the direct measurement could indicate a fault in the Standard Model.
- New precision measurements of the electron-positron annihilation in hadrons, a fundamental ingredient to evaluate the dispersion relationship required to calculate the vacuum polarization.

The construction, development and analysis of the Virgo interferometer data involved a colossal effort through international collaboration in which the group founded by Michel Davier at the LAL took a significant part:

- Construction and controls of the ultra-high vacuum enclosure of the two 3 km arms of the interferometer.
- Overall control of the lengths of the kilometric optical cavities.
- Development of detection algorithms.
- Discovery with Advanced-LIGO data of gravitational waves emitted during the coalescence of binary black hole systems (2015) of masses several dozen times the solar mass. It is the first direct demonstration of a dynamic of relativistic compact objects in a strong gravitational field, in accordance with General Relativity.
- Precise location in the sky thanks to the network of two Advanced-LIGO and Advanced-Virgo instruments marking the beginning of gravitational astronomy.
- Discovery of the coalescence of a binary system of neutron stars (2016). The early warning sent to astrophysicists' collaborations allowed their detectors to highlight a multifrequency optical counterpart (gamma, X, visible, infrared, radio) providing unique information on the evolutionary dynamics of the collision.

== Books ==
- Physique pour les Sciences de la Vie, 1. La Physique et ses Méthodes (Belin, 1987)
- Physique pour les Sciences de la Vie, 2. La Matière (Belin, 1988)
- Physique pour les Sciences de la Vie, 3. Les Ondes (Belin, 1988)
- LHC : Enquête sur le Boson de Higgs (Le Pommier, 2008)
- LHC : le Boson de Higgs (Le Pommier, 2013)

== Honors and awards ==
- French Academy of Sciences (Correspondent 1994, Member 1996)
- Institut Universitaire de France (first promotion 1991–2001)
- Abraham-Bloch-Bruhat Prize (Ecole Normale Supérieure, 1991)
- Gentner-Kastler Prize (Sociétés Française et Allemande de Physique, 1992)
- Three Physicists Prize (École Normale Supérieure, 1992)
- Lagarrigue Prize (LAL et Société Française de Physique, 2011)
- Special Breakthrough Prize (avec la collaboration LIGO-Virgo, 2016 )
- Chevalier of l'ordre national du Mérite (1995)
- Chevalier of Légion d'honneur (2017).
