= STATPHYS =

STATPHYS or IUPAP International Conference on Statistical Physics is a series of conferences organized by the International Union of Pure and Applied Physics. The conferences take place every three years in a different continent to give the maximum international relevance and visibility to the event. It is the world event for the broad field of statistical physics and all its interdisciplinary developments. The first meeting was in Florence (Italy) from 17 to 20 May 1949. After a pioneering period the periodicity of three years was established and the conference has acquired more and more importance. The participation has reached peaks up to 1500 participants in the recent years. Also on the occasion of this conference the prestigious Boltzmann medal is awarded. In addition several satellite meetings are usually held along with the main event, adding to the scientific value of the meeting.

List of STATPHYS Conferences
Conference	Site	Date	Notes
STATPHYS1^{[a]}	Florence, Italy	May 17–20, 1949	
STATPHYS2^{[a]}	Paris, France	1952	
STATPHYS3^{[a]}	Brussels, Belgium	1956	
STATPHYS4^{[a]}	Varenna, Italy	1957	
STATPHYS5^{[a]}	Utrecht, Netherlands	1960	
STATPHYS6^{[a]}	New York, United States	1962	
STATPHYS7^{[a]}	Aachen, West Germany	1964	
STATPHYS8^{[a]}	Copenhagen, Denmark	July 11–16, 1966	
STATPHYS9^{[a]}	Kyoto, Japan	September 9–14, 1968	
STATPHYS10^{[a]}	Chicago, United States	1971	
STATPHYS11^{[a]}	Amsterdam, Netherlands	1973	
STATPHYS12^{[a]}	Budapest, Hungary	August 25–29, 1975	
STATPHYS13	Haifa, Israel	August 24–30, 1977	
STATPHYS14	Edmonton, Canada	August 17–22, 1980	
STATPHYS15	Edinburgh, United Kingdom	1983	
STATPHYS16	Boston, United States	August 11–15, 1986	
STATPHYS17	Rio de Janeiro, Brazil	July 31 – August 4, 1989	
STATPHYS18	Berlin, Germany	August 2–8, 1992	
STATPHYS19	Xiamen, China	July 31 – August 4, 1995	
STATPHYS20	Paris, France	July 20–24, 1998	
STATPHYS21	Cancun, Mexico	July 15–21, 2001	
STATPHYS22	Bengaluru, India	July 4–9, 2004	
STATPHYS23	Genoa, Italy	July 9–13, 2007	
STATPHYS24	Cairns, Australia	July 19–23, 2010	
STATPHYS25	Seoul, South Korea	July 22–26, 2013	
STATPHYS26	Lyon, France	July 18–22, 2016	
STATPHYS27	Buenos Aires, Argentina	July 8–12, 2019	
STATPHYS28	Tokyo, Japan	August 7–11, 2023	Originally scheduled for 2022; postponed due to COVID-19
STATPHYS29	Florence, Italy	July 14–18, 2025	
STATPHYS30	Salvador, Bahia, Brazil	July 17–21, 2028	

^{a} Numbered retrospectively.
