= Élisabeth Charlaix =

French physicist

Élisabeth Charlaix (born 23 October 1958), is a French physicist. She is a professor at the Université Grenoble Alpes, where she researches fluid mechanics to the sub-nanometre level. She was a co-developer of a surface-forces measuring device for very small-scale interactions.

== Biography ==
She was a post-doctoral researcher at ESPCI Paris, studying the properties of porous materials in work funded by Exxon. She joined the École normale supérieure de Lyon physics laboratory, where she studied wetting phenomena at the microscopic level and the effects of humidity on granular media. After her appointment as professor at Claude-Bernard University, she joined their Department of Materials Physics, which became the Laboratoire de physique de la matière condensée et nanostructures (LPMCN) [Laboratory of Condensed Matter and Nanostructure Physics]. At LPMCN, she researched fluid dynamics at nanoscales (nanofluidics) which progressed following the construction of an original surface forces measuring apparatus in 2002, which was developed with Jérôme Crassous and fr:Frédéric Restagno; the apparatus uses a combination of capacitance and interferometry to measure the forces, with which important data was found concerning the link between wettability and hydrodynamic conditions at solid-fluid interfaces.

In 2010, she joined the interdisciplinary physics laboratory in Grenoble. She was able to show that nanohydrodynamic measurements make it possible to have access to the mechanical properties of surfaces without solid contact and she highlighted the advantage and convenience of confining surfaces during nanorheology experiments. As well as analysing various properties related to capillary adhesion and the sub-nanometre properties of bubbles and thin films, for example, her teams have also discovered properties relating to energy storage in hydrophobic pores in powders.

In addition to her academic awards, she became a Chevalier de la Legion d'Honneur in 2011. An international conference was held in her honour at the University of Bordeaux in 2018.

== Awards ==
- 2006 Jean-Ricard Prize from the French Physical Society.
- 2007 Senior member of the Institut universitaire de France.
- 2009 CNRS Silver Medal
- 2011 Légion d'honneur
- 2022 APS Division of Fluid Dynamics Otto Laporte award
