= Aleksandra Walczak =

Theoretical biophysicist

- Education: University of California, San Diego
- Scientific career
- Fields: Biophysics
- Workplaces: Ecole Normale Supérieure
- Website: www.phys.ens.fr/~awalczak/

Aleksandra M. Walczak is a theoretical biophysicist. She works on stochastic gene expression, immunology, evolution and collective motion at Ecole Normale Supérieure where she is a research director.

== Education ==
Walczak completed her master's degree at the University of Warsaw, Poland in 2002, her PhD at University of California, San Diego in 2007, and was a post-doc until 2010 at Princeton University.

== Honours ==
- 2014 - Grand Prix Jacques Herbrand de l'Académie des sciences (Jacques Herbrand Prize)
- 2016 - CNRS Bronze medal
- 2021 - Fellow of the American Physical Society for "insightful theoretical work on the physics of genetic networks, collective animal behavior, and especially the origins and functionality of antibody diversity, thus setting an agenda for a generation."
- 2021 - Prix Jean Ricard awarded by the Société française de physique
- 2024 - CNRS Silver medal
- 2025 - International member of National Academy of Sciences

== Selected publications ==
- Lässig, Michael; Mustonen, Ville; Walczak, Aleksandra M. (March 2017). "Predicting evolution". Nature Ecology & Evolution. 1 (3): 0077. Bibcode:2017NatEE...1...77L. doi:10.1038/s41559-017-0077. S2CID 2978836.
- Mora, Thierry; Walczak, Aleksandra M.; Bialek, William; Callan, Curtis G. (23 March 2010). "Maximum entropy models for antibody diversity". Proceedings of the National Academy of Sciences. 107 (12): 5405–5410. arXiv:0912.5175. Bibcode:2010PNAS..107.5405M. doi:10.1073/pnas.1001705107. PMC 2851784. PMID 20212159.
- Hornos, J. E. M.; Schultz, D.; Innocentini, G. C. P.; Wang, J.; Walczak, A. M.; Onuchic, J. N.; Wolynes, P. G. (4 November 2005). "Self-regulating gene: An exact solution". Physical Review E. 72 (5) 051907. Bibcode:2005PhRvE..72e1907H. doi:10.1103/PhysRevE.72.051907. PMID 16383645.
- Murugan, Anand; Mora, Thierry; Walczak, Aleksandra M.; Callan, Curtis G. (2 October 2012). "Statistical inference of the generation probability of T-cell receptors from sequence repertoires". Proceedings of the National Academy of Sciences. 109 (40): 16161–16166. arXiv:1208.3925. Bibcode:2012PNAS..10916161M. doi:10.1073/pnas.1212755109. PMC 3479580. PMID 22988065.
