= Marc Barthelemy =

Physicist

- Education: Ecole normale supérieure, Paris
- Known for: Complex networks, Spatial networks, Urban systems modelling
- Relatives: René Barthélemy (Grandfather)
- Awards: Prix Jean Ricard
- Scientific career
- Fields: Physics
- Workplaces: CEA Paris-Saclay
- Website: www.ipht.fr/en/pisp/marc-barthelemy-2/

Marc Barthelemy is a French theoretical physicist at the Institute of Theoretical Physics (IPhT) in Paris-Saclay (CEA/CNRS). He worked on complex and spatial networks, theoretical epidemiology, and urban dynamics. His work addresses issues at the intersection of physics and various disciplines such as geography, urban planning, epidemiology, and demography. By leveraging tools and concepts from statistical physics, he has analyzed empirical data and modeled diverse systems, tackling crucial challenges such as virus propagation, mobility and congestion in cities, the historical evolution of infrastructures, and the dynamics of urban populations.

Marc Barthelemy is known for his studies on spatial networks and infrastructures, the structure of cities, transportation systems, and the urban population evolution and Zipf's law. The city growth equation reveals that urban population evolution is governed by a stochastic model incorporating two types of fluctuations: those related to interurban migrations and those due to natural growth.

== Biography ==
Marc Barthelemy is an alumnus of the Ecole normale supérieure, Paris, and earned his PhD from the Pierre et Marie Curie University in 1992. During 1999-2000, he was a visiting scholar in H. Eugene Stanley's lab, where he began his work on networks. From 2005 to 2007, he visited Indiana University (Bloomington, Indiana), focusing on epidemiology and spatial networks. Upon returning to France, he shifted his attention to transport and infrastructure networks, as well as the quantitative description and modeling of urban systems.

== Awards ==
- 2024 - Prix Jean Ricard awarded by the Société française de physique

== Books ==
=== Scientific monographs ===
- Barrat, Alain; Barthelemy, Marc; Vespignani, Alessandro (2008). Dynamical Processes on Complex Networks. Cambridge University Press. Bibcode:2008dpcn.book.....B.
- Barthelemy, M. (2018). Morphogenesis of Spatial Networks. Cham, Switzerland: Springer International Publishing.
- Barthelemy, M. (November 24, 2016). The Structure and Dynamics of Cities. Cambridge University Press. Bibcode:2016sdc..book.....B.
- Barthelemy, Marc (2022). Spatial Networks: A Complete Introduction: From Graph Theory and Statistical Physics to Real-World Applications. Springer Nature.
- Barthelemy, Marc; Verbavatz, Vincent (December 6, 2023). Statistics and Dynamics of Urban Populations: Empirical Results and Theoretical Approaches. Oxford University Press.

=== Popular Science book ===
- Barthelemy, Marc (January 18, 2023). Le monde des réseaux (in French). Odile Jacob.

== Selected publications ==
- Amaral, L. A.; Scala, A.; Barthelemy, M.; Stanley, H. E. (October 10, 2000). "Classes of small-world networks". Proceedings of the National Academy of Sciences. 97 (21): 11149–11152. arXiv:cond-mat/0001458. Bibcode:2000PNAS...9711149A. doi:10.1073/pnas.200327197. PMC 17168. PMID 11005838.
- Barrat, A.; Barthelemy, M.; Pastor-Satorras, R.; Vespignani, A. (March 16, 2004). "The architecture of complex weighted networks". Proceedings of the National Academy of Sciences. 101 (11): 3747–3752. arXiv:cond-mat/0311416. Bibcode:2004PNAS..101.3747B. doi:10.1073/pnas.0400087101. PMC 374315. PMID 15007165.
- Fortunato, S.; Barthelemy, M. (January 2, 2007). "Resolution limit in community detection". Proceedings of the National Academy of Sciences. 104 (1): 36–41. arXiv:physics/0607100. Bibcode:2007PNAS..104...36F. doi:10.1073/pnas.0605965104. PMC 1765466. PMID 17190818.
- Barthelemy, M. (February 2011). "Spatial networks". Physics Reports. 499 (1–3): 1–101. arXiv:1010.0302. Bibcode:2011PhR...499....1B. doi:10.1016/j.physrep.2010.11.002.
- Verbavatz, V.; Barthelemy, M. (November 19, 2020). "The growth equation of cities". Nature. 587 (7834): 397–401. arXiv:2011.09403. Bibcode:2020Natur.587..397V. doi:10.1038/s41586-020-2900-x. PMID 33208958.
