= Nazzareno Mandolesi =

Italian astrophysicist and cosmologist

Nazzareno Mandolesi (born 31 August 1944 in San Benedetto del Tronto) is an Italian astrophysicist and cosmologist. He graduated in physics from the University of Bologna in 1969 and pursued further studies at Imperial. From 1975 to 2010, he led the Team for Infrared Astronomy and Experimental Cosmology in Bologna. He was also a visiting professor at Haverford College in 1978.

In 2018, Mandolesi was co-awarded the Gruber Prize in Cosmology alongside Jean-Loup Puget for their leadership of the ESA Planck project, which collected data from the Cosmic Microwave Background at 'an unprecedented level' of accuracy.
