= Jacqueline Bloch =

French physicist and nanosciences specialist

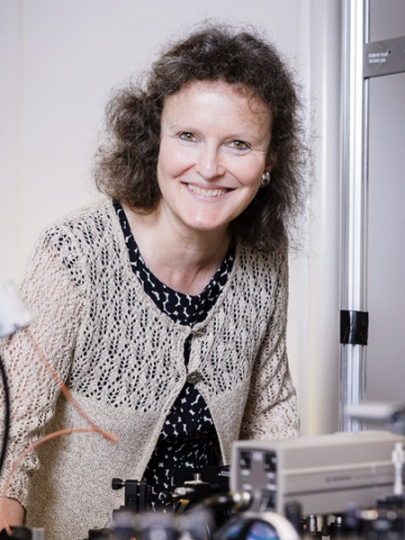
Jacqueline Bloch in her laboratory at Centre de Nanosciences et de Nanotechnologies (C2N), Univ. Paris Saclay

Jacqueline Bloch (born 1967) is a French physicist, specialist in nanosciences. She is known for her research on polariton condensates.

== Biography ==
Jacqueline Bloch is the daughter of physicist Claude Bloch. She graduated as an ESPCI engineer in 1991 (106th promotion), with a DEA in condensed matter physics (1990). She holds a doctorate from the Pierre and Marie Curie University on the study of the optical properties of quantum wires. In 1994, she joined the CNRS and carried out her research at the L2M (Laboratoire de microstructures et de microélecroniques) in Bagneux, which moved and became the LPN (Laboratoire de photonique et nanostructures) in Marcoussis in 2001. In 1998, she spent a year there and carried out research at the Bell Laboratories.

Bloch is interested in the ultimate coupling between light and matter in close connection with semiconductor nanotechnologies. In particular, she has made important discoveries in the study of the physics of polariton condensates.

In 2026, Bloch represented the Academy of Sciences as a member of the commission to develop a list of 72 women in STEM proposed to be added to the 72 men named on the Eiffel Tower.

She has two sons, also scientists.

== Awards ==
- 2014: Chevalier of the Légion d'Honneur
- 2015 : Jean-Ricard Prize of the French Physical Society
- 2017: CNRS Silver Medal
- 2019: Prix Ampère de l'Electricité de France of the French Academy of Sciences
- 2019: Elected member of the French Academy of Sciences in the Physics Section.
- 2026: CNRS Gold Medal
