= Charbonnier-les-Mines =

- Commune
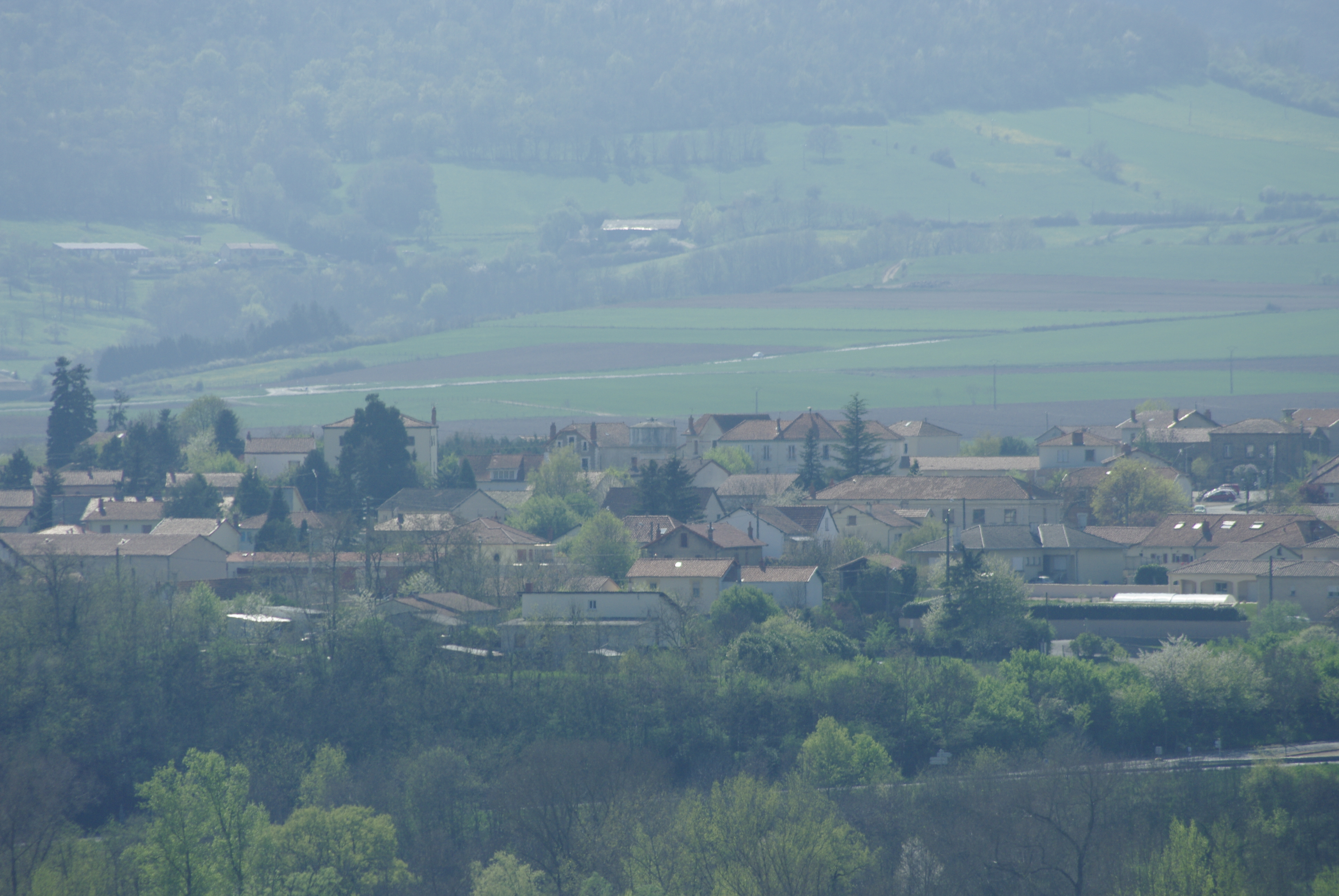
- A general view of Charbonnier-les-Mines
- Location of Charbonnier-les-Mines
- Location within France Location within Auvergne-Rhône-Alpes
- Coordinates: 45°25′03″N 3°17′09″E
- Country: France
- Region: Auvergne-Rhône-Alpes
- Department: Puy-de-Dôme
- Arrondissement: Issoire
- Canton: Brassac-les-Mines
- Intercommunality: Agglo Pays d'Issoire

Government
  - Mayor (2026–32): Pascal Berthelot
- Area^{1}: 3.36 km^{2} (1.30 sq mi)
- Elevation: 430 m (1,410 ft)
- Highest elevation: 492 m (1,614 ft)
- Lowest elevation: 403 m (1,322 ft)
- Population (2023): 930
  - Density: 280/km^{2} (720/sq mi)
- Time zone: UTC+01:00 (CET)
  - Summer (DST): UTC+02:00 (CEST)
- INSEE/Postal code: 63091 /63340
- ^{1} French Land Register data, which excludes lakes, ponds, glaciers > 1 km^{2} (0.386 sq mi or 247 acres) and river estuaries.

Charbonnier-les-Mines (French pronunciation: [ʃaʁbɔnje le min]) is a commune in the Puy-de-Dôme department in Auvergne-Rhône-Alpes in central France. It is in the canton of Brassac-les-Mines.

== See also ==
- Communes of the Puy-de-Dôme department
