= Balian–Low theorem =

In mathematics, the Balian–Low theorem in Fourier analysis is named for Roger Balian and Francis E. Low. The theorem states that there is no well-localized window function (or Gabor atom) g either in time or frequency for an exact Gabor frame (Riesz Basis).

== Statement ==
Suppose g is a square-integrable function on the real line, and consider the so-called Gabor system

$$g_{m,n}(x) = e^{2\pi i m b x} g(x - n a),$$

for integers m and n, and a,b>0 satisfying ab=1. The Balian–Low theorem states that if

$$\{g_{m,n}: m, n \in \mathbb{Z}\}$$

is an orthonormal basis for the Hilbert space

$$L^2(\mathbb{R}),$$

then either

$$\int_{-\infty}^\infty x^2 | g(x)|^2\; dx = \infty \quad \textrm{or} \quad \int_{-\infty}^\infty \xi^2|\hat{g}(\xi)|^2\; d\xi = \infty.$$

== Generalizations ==
The Balian–Low theorem has been extended to exact Gabor frames.

== See also ==
- Gabor filter (in image processing)
