= Sébastien Balibar =

French physicist

- Born: 14 October 1947 (age 78); Tours, France
- Education: Lycée Descartes
- Alma mater: École polytechnique
- Occupation: Physicist

Sébastien Balibar (born 14 October 1947) is a French physicist and a member of the French Academy of Sciences. On May 1, 2017, he signed with other scientists a text calling for a vote in favor of Emmanuel Macron during the second round of the 2017 presidential election, in order to "block the road to the worst", represented by Marine Le Pen.

== Awards ==
- 1978 – Prix Brelot de la Société Française de Physique
- 1988 – Prix Paul Langevin of French Academy of Sciences
- 1989 – "Photographic Award", conférence ICCG9, Sendai, Japon (with E. Rolley)
- 1994 – Grand Prix du Bicentenaire de l'École polytechnique (Prix Dargelos)
- 1999 – Professeur Invité, Konstanz Universität, Allemagne
- 1999 – Senior Fellow of the Japan Society for the Promotion of Science
- 1999 – Professeur invité, Kyoto University, Japan
- 1999–2000 – Loeb lecturer, Harvard University, USA
- 2003 – Professeur invité, Kyoto University, Japan
- 2005 – Fritz London memorial prize [with J.C. Seamus Davis (Cornell) and R.E. Packard (Berkeley)]
- 2005 – Fellow of the American Physical Society (voir le site de l'APS)
- 2007 – Three Physicists Prize, ENS (Paris)
- 2009 – Lauréat de l'European Research Council (ERC Advanced grants)
- 2012 – Grand Prix Jean-Ricard de la Société Française de Physique

== Bibliography ==
- Demain, la physique, par Alain Aspect, Roger Balian, Sébastien Balibar, Edouard Brézin et al., éditions Odile Jacob, Paris 2004
- La Pomme et l'atome, Douze histoires de physique contemporaine, par Sébastien Balibar, éditions Odile Jacob, Paris 2005
- Je casse de l'eau, et autres rêveries scientifiques, par Sébastien Balibar (dessins de Jean Kerleroux), éditions Le Pommier, Paris 2008
- Chercheur au quotidien, par Sébastien Balibar, éditions du Seuil et Raconter la vie, Paris 2014
- Climat: y voir clair pour agir', par Sébastien Balibar, éditions Le Pommier, Paris 2015
