= Madan Lal Mehta =

Indian physicist (1932–2006)

- Born: 24 December 1932; Relmagra, Udaipur
- Died: 10 December 2006; Udaipur, Rajasthan
- Education: University of Rajasthan, University of Paris
- Scientific career
- Fields: Physics, Mathematics
- Workplaces: Department of Theoretical Physics in Saclay

Madan Lal Mehta (1932–2006) was an Indian theoretical physicist, particularly known for his work in random matrix theory.

== Biography ==
Madan Lal Mehta was born on 24 December 1932 in Relmagra, Rajasthan, a small village near Udaipur in northwest India. He obtained his Master of Science in Mathematics from the University of Rajasthan (Jaipur) in 1956.

After two years at the Tata Institute of Fundamental Research in Bombay, he went to France in November 1958 to join the Department of Mathematical Physics (now the Department of Theoretical Physics) at Centre d'Etudes Nucléaires de Saclay.

In 1961, he received his PhD under Claude Bloch working on materials at low density. From 1962 to 1963, he worked at the Institute for Advanced Study in Princeton (USA).

He then returned to India, working at Delhi University, before returning to the United States from 1966–1967 to work at Princeton University and Argonne National Laboratory. Later, Mehta moved to the Department of Theoretical Physics at CEA Saclay in September 1967, where he remained until the end of his academic career. As CNRS hired him in 1970, Mehta acquired French citizenship in 1971.

After his career at CEA Saclay, he returned to India in January 2005 and died on 10 December 2006, in Udaipur. Mehta spoke several languages, including English, French, Russian, Japanese, Mandarin and Hindi.

== Work in physics ==
Madan Lal Mehta is known for his work on random matrices. His book "Random Matrices" is considered classic in the field. Eugene Wigner cited Mehta during his SIAM review on Random Matrices. Physicist Freeman Dyson recommended Mehta's book to mathematician Hugh Montgomery, to perhaps explain the pair correlation Montgomery had found between the zeroes of the Riemann zeta function.

Together with Michel Gaudin, Mehta developed the orthogonal polynomial method, a basic tool to study the eigenvalue distribution of invariant matrix ensembles. Together with Freeman Dyson, Mehta worked on Dyson's circular ensembles. Other well-known collaborators include P.K. Srivastava, N. Rozenzweig, J. of Cloizeaux, G. Mahoux, A. Pandey, Pragya Shukla, J.M. Normand, I. Kostov and B. Eynard.
