= Jacques Prost =

French physicist

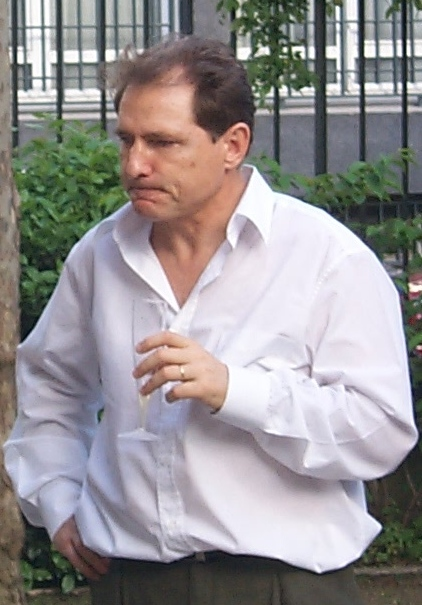
- Born: 1946 (age 79–80)
- Education: ENS Lyon; Harvard University; Curie Institute
- Awards: Lars Onsager Prize (2024)
- Scientific career
- Workplaces: ESPCI Paris

Jacques Prost, born in 1946 in Bourg-en-Bresse, is a French physicist, former General director of École supérieure de physique et de chimie industrielles de la ville de Paris, member of the French Academy of Sciences.

Alumni of the École normale supérieure de Saint-Cloud (sciences) (1965), Jacques Prost studied at Harvard University and founded and head (1987–1995) the "Theoretical Physico-Chemistry" Group of the ESPCI ParisTech under the direction of Pierre-Gilles de Gennes. His group studied liquid crystal and soft matter properties. In 1996, he founded the group "Physical Chemistry Curie" lab at the Curie Institute (Paris). His group studies physical approaches to biological problems and describes cell motion, molecular motors, the properties of biological membranes and protein adhesion.

Jacques Prost was the scientific advisor to Elf Aquitaine from 1990 to 1999. He is a member of the French Academy of Sciences since 2007. Jacques Prost has been the General director of ESPCI ParisTech since 2003.

He is the recipient of the 2024 Lars Onsager Prize in theoretical statistical physics by the American Physical Society, for

influential contributions to the statistical physics of nonequilibrium phenomena and applications to soft matter and biological systems.
