= Albert Messiah =

French physicist (1921–2013)

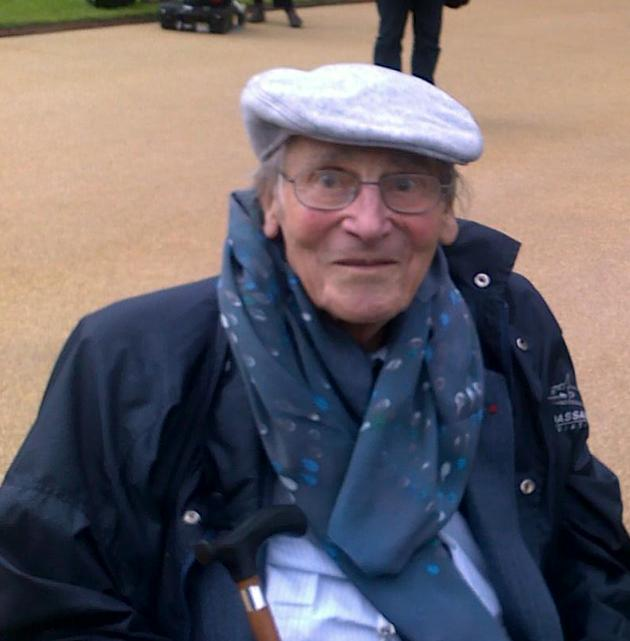
- Messiah in 2010
- Born: Albert Moïse Louis Messiah; 23 September 1921; Nice
- Died: 17 April 2013 (aged 91); 13th arrondissement of Paris
- Alma mater: University of Rochester
- Academic career
- Fields: Quantum physics
- Institutions: French Alternative Energies and Atomic Energy Commission; Pierre and Marie Curie University
- Doctoral advisor: Robert Marshak

Albert Messiah (23 September 1921, Nice – 17 April 2013, Paris) was a French physicist. He studied at the Ecole Polytechnique. He spent the Second World War in the Free France forces: he embarked on 22 June 1940 at Saint-Jean-de-Luz for England and participated in the Battle of Dakar with Charles de Gaulle in September 1940. He joined the Free French Forces in Chad, and the 2nd Armored Division in September 1944, and participated in the assault of Hitler's Eagle's nest at Berchtesgaden in 1945.

As a French Jew who escaped France to fight in the Free French Army of de Gaulle, he was awarded a grant to study and work at the Institute for Advanced Study in Princeton, New Jersey in the US. The seminars at the Institute were incomprehensible to Messiah who had only a high-school education in physics, and he became depressed to the extent that he considered abandoning his plans to become a physicist. He met Robert Marshak at a meeting of the American Physical Society in Washington, DC and Marshak suggested that Messiah come to the University of Rochester and get a US PhD in physics.

He returned to France and introduced the first general courses of quantum mechanics in France, at the University of Orsay and joined the newly created atomic energy agency, the Commissariat à l'énergie atomique (CEA) where he stayed until the end of his career.

Messiah collaborated with Oscar W. Greenberg on identical particle statistics other than bosons or fermions. This work led directly to Greenberg's suggestion of parastatistics of order 3 for quarks, which was the first suggestion that quarks carry a hidden three-valued charge, now colloquially called "color charge."

He was the director of the Physics Division at the CEA and professor at the Pierre and Marie Curie University. He was honored as Commandeur de la Légion d'honneur of France (2012).

== Book ==
His classic textbook on quantum mechanics Mecanique Quantique (Dunod 1959), translated as Quantum Mechanics has trained generations of French and world physicists.
