= Bernard Derrida =

French theoretical physicist

- Education: École Normale Supérieure
- Known for: Applying ideas from statistical physics to problems in biology Random energy model
- Relatives: Jacques Derrida (cousin)
- Awards: Ampère Prize (2001); Boltzmann Medal (2010); ICTP Dirac Medal (2026)
- Scientific career
- Fields: Statistical mechanics
- Workplaces: Pierre and Marie Curie University; École Normale Supérieure
- Thesis: (1976)

Bernard Derrida (French: [dɛʁida]; born 1952) is a French theoretical physicist. He is best known for his work in statistical mechanics, and is the eponym of Derrida plots, an analytical technique for characterising differences between Boolean networks.

== Biography ==
Derrida entered the École Normale Supérieure in 1971, and received his doctorate in 1976. Since 1993 he has been professor of physics at Université Pierre et Marie Curie and at ENS. He is an expert in statistical mechanics who has adapted statistical-physics ideas to various problems in biology.

He was elected, in 2004 to the Académie des sciences.

In 2010, Derrida was awarded the Boltzmann Medal by IUPAP with John Cardy.

In 2026, he was awarded the ICTP Dirac Medal for his contributions to statistical mechanics.

He is philosopher Jacques Derrida's first cousin once removed.
