= Albert J. Libchaber =

Albert Joseph Libchaber
- Born: 23 October 1934 (age 90); Paris
- Awards: Wolf Foundation Prize in Physics (1986)

Albert Joseph Libchaber (born 23 October 1934, Paris) is a Detlev W. Bronk Professor at The Rockefeller University. He won the Wolf Prize in Physics in 1986. In 1999 he received the Prix des Trois Physiciens from the Fondation de France.

== Education ==
Albert J. Libchaber graduated with a bachelor's degree in mathematics from the University of Paris in 1956 and an Ingénieur des Telecommunications from the Ecole Nationale Supérieure des Telecommunications in 1958. He earned a master of science degree in physics from the University of Illinois in 1959, under the supervision of John Bardeen and his doctoral degree from the École Normale Supérieure in 1965 under the supervision of Robert Veilex.

== Academic career ==
Libchaber was a member of the Laboratoire de Physique des Solides of the École Normale Supérieure until 1982 then professor at the University of Chicago from 1983 to 1991. He left Chicago and became a professor of physics at Princeton University in 1991. In the same year, the NEC Research Institute in Princeton named him a fellow and, in 1993, he became the James S. McDonnell Distinguished University Professor at Princeton. He joined the faculty at The Rockefeller University in 1994.

== Research ==
Albert Libchaber made major contributions in experimental condensed matter physics. In particular, he carried out the first experimental observation of the bifurcation cascade that leads to chaos and turbulence in convective Rayleigh–Bénard systems. Using microbolometers engraved in the convective cell he was able to observe temperature fluctuations without perturbing the environment. In this way, he clearly observed the bifurcations that lead to chaos: period doubling, possibly accompanied by locking of several incommensurate frequencies. The theoretical predictions of Mitchell Feigenbaum were thus entirely confirmed. His first work was done on 4He; later he used mercury, in which an applied magnetic field provides an additional degree of freedom. The experiment is so perfect that it can measure quantitatively the Feigenbaum critical exponents that characterize the cascade to chaos. For this achievement, he was awarded the Wolf Prize in Physics in 1986, along with Mitchell J. Feigenbaum, "for his brilliant experimental demonstration of the transition to turbulence and chaos in dynamical systems".

Since the 1990s, Albert Libchaber's research has been primarily in biology, from the viewpoints of physics and nonlinear dynamics.
