= Jean Zinn-Justin =

French physicist

- Born: 10 July 1943 (age 83)
- Education: École Polytechnique
- Known for: Quantum field theory, Renormalization group
- Awards: Paul Langevin award (1977); Ampère award (1981); Gentner-Kastler award (1996); Gay-Lussac Humboldt award (2003)
- Scientific career
- Fields: Physics
- Workplaces: Saclay Nuclear Research Centre

Jean Zinn-Justin (born 10 July 1943 in Berlin) is a French theoretical physicist.

== Biography ==
Zinn-Justin was educated in physics (undergraduate 1964) at the École Polytechnique, and did graduate work in theoretical physics at Orsay, (Ph.D. 1968) under the supervision of Marcel Froissart.

Zinn-Justin has worked since 1965 as a theoretical and mathematical physicist at the Saclay Nuclear Research Centre (CEA), where he was head of theoretical physics in 1993−1998 . He has served as a visiting professor at the Massachusetts Institute of Technology (MIT), Princeton University, State University of New York at Stony Brook (1972), and Harvard University, and further guest scientists at CERN. From 1987 to 1995 he was Director of the Les Houches School of Physics. In 2003 he became leader of DAPNIA (Department of Astrophysics, Particle Physics, Nuclear Physics and Associated Instrumentation) at Saclay.

He has made seminal contributions to the renormalizability of gauge theories. He is a world authority on quantum field theory in particle and phase transitions in statistical physics, and, in particular, the renormalization group organizing and connecting these two areas. He has written definitive books on the subject.

In 1977, he was awarded the Paul Langevin Prize of the Société Française de Physique; in 1981 the Ampère prize of the French Academy of Sciences; in 1996 the Gentner-Kastler Prize of the Société Française de Physique jointly with the Deutsche Physikalische Gesellschaft (DPG); in 2003 the Gay-Lussac-Humboldt prize. In 2011, he was elected to the French Academy of Sciences.

== Books ==
- Quantum Field Theory and Critical Phenomena, Clarendon Press, Oxford, 1989, 1993, 1996, 2002, 2021 ISBN 978-0198509233
- Path Integrals in Quantum Mechanics, Oxford University Press, 2005, ISBN 978-0198566748
- Phase Transitions and Renormalization Group, Oxford University Press, 2007, ISBN 978-0199227198
- From Random Walks to Random Matrices, Oxford University Press, 2021, ISBN 978-0192856968
