= Claude Bloch =

French theoretical nuclear physicist

- Born: March 18, 1921; Paris, France
- Died: December 29, 1971 (aged 50)
- Education: École polytechnique
- Known for: Bloch–Messiah decomposition
- Children: Jacqueline Bloch
- Scientific career
- Fields: Theoretical physics
- Workplaces: CEA

Claude Bloch (18 March 1923 – 29 December 1971) was a French theoretical nuclear physicist that worked on quantum field theory, nuclear physics, and the many-body problem. With Albert Messiah, he developed what is now known as the Bloch–Messiah decomposition of quantum optics in 1962.

Bloch was born on 18 March 1923 in Paris, France. He was admitted to the École Polytechnique in 1942 and graduated first in his class. He entered the Corps des Mines in 1946. He studied at the Bohr Institute in Copenhagen from 1948-1951 where he worked on the problems in the non-local theory of quantum fields. He worked at the California Institute of Technology in 1952-1953 where he worked on the statistical theory of the nucleus. Upon returning to France in 1953, he joined the Commissariat à l'Energie Atomique (CEA), where he stayed until his death in 1971. While at the CEA, he directed the theoretical physics department at Centre d'Études Nucléaires de Saclay, Gif-sur-Yvette.

His daughter, Jacqueline Bloch is also a physicist.
