= Édouard Brézin =

French physicist (born 1938)

Édouard Brezin
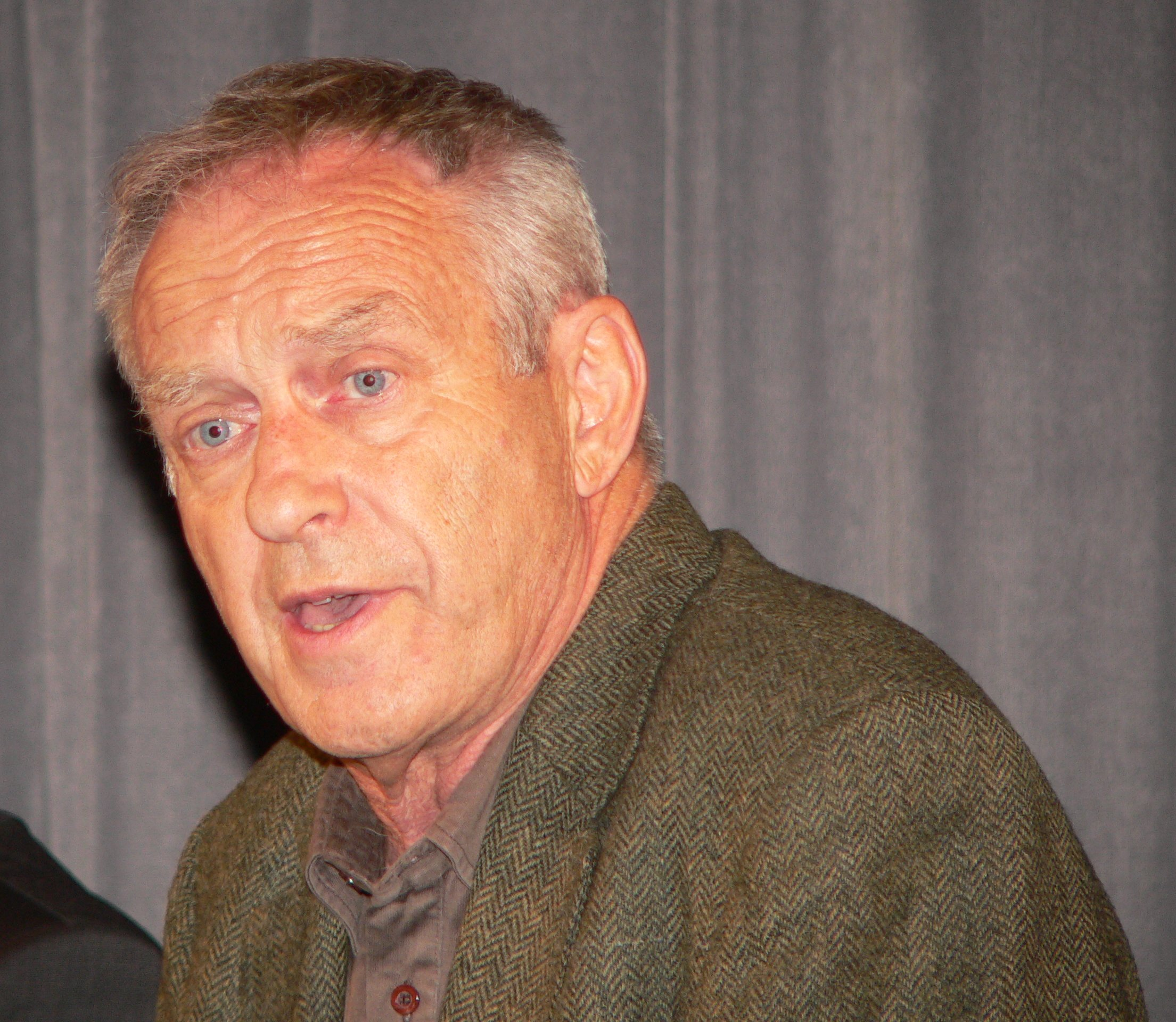
- Born: 1 December 1938 (age 87); Paris, France
- Education: École Polytechnique; École des ponts ParisTech
- Scientific career
- Fields: Physics

Édouard Brézin (French: [bʁezɛ̃]; born 1 December 1938 Paris) is a French theoretical physicist. He is professor at Université Paris 6, working at the laboratory for theoretical physics (LPT) of the École Normale Supérieure since 1986.

== Biography ==
Brézin was born in Paris, France, to agnostic Jewish parents from Poland. His father served in the French army during World War II and was taken prisoner by the Germans in 1940, but escaped. The family used false names and Brézin was hidden by farmers.

Brézin studied at École Polytechnique before doing a PhD. He worked at the theory division of the Commissariat à l'énergie atomique in Saclay until 1986.

Brezin contributed to the field of physics that deals with the macroscopic physical properties of matter and high energy physics. He was a leader in critical behavior theory and developed methods for distilling testable predictions for critical exponents. In using field theoretic techniques in the study of condensed matter, Brezin helped further modern theories of magnetism and the quantum Hall effect.

Brézin was elected a member of the French Academy of Sciences on 18 February 1991 and served as president of the academy in 2005–2006. He also is a foreign associate of the United States National Academy of Sciences (since 2003), a foreign honorary member of the American Academy of Arts and Sciences (since 2002), a foreign member of the Royal Society (since 2006) and a member of the Academia Europaea (since 2003). He is a commander in the French National order of merit and a Commander of the Legion of Honor.

He is Chair of the Cyprus Research and Educational Foundation. He was awarded the 2011 Dirac Medal of the International Centre for Theoretical Physics together with John Cardy and Alexander Zamolodchikov.

In 2004 he won the Institute of Physics President's Medal.

== Research work ==
Edouard Brezin's work is devoted to quantum field theory, mainly for applications in statistical physics. It uses the theoretical formulation of the renormalization group for critical phenomena (equation of states, scaling corrections, etc.). He showed that the low temperature phase, in the case of a continuous symmetry break, is described by a non-linear sigma model, leading to a development of critical exponents in powers of the minus two space dimension. He showed that the instantaneous method can be used to characterize the asymptotic behaviour of perturbation theory, thus allowing accurate theoretical estimates to be made. He has applied field theory techniques to condensed matter problems, such as critical wetting theory or the study of the phase transition from a normal metal to a type II superconductor under magnetic field. He became interested in theories of gauging with a large number of colors. This led to a representation of two-dimensional quantum gravity by random fluctuating surfaces or closed bosonic strings, in terms of random matrices. He showed that the continuous boundary of such models is linked to integrable hierarchies such as KdV flows. He has also worked on establishing the universality of eigenvalue correlations for random matrices.

== Notable publications ==
- Brezin, E.; Itzykson, C. (1970-10-01). "Pair Production in Vacuum by an Alternating Field". Physical Review D. 2 (7). American Physical Society (APS): 1191–1199. Bibcode:1970PhRvD...2.1191B. doi:10.1103/physrevd.2.1191. ISSN 0556-2821.
- Brézin, E.; Wallace, D. J.; Wilson, Kenneth G. (1972-08-28). "Feynman-Graph Expansion for the Equation of State near the Critical Point (Ising-like Case)". Physical Review Letters. 29 (9). American Physical Society (APS): 591–594. Bibcode:1972PhRvL..29..591B. doi:10.1103/physrevlett.29.591. ISSN 0031-9007.
- Brezin, E.; Le Guillou, J. C.; Zinn-Justin, J. (1973-07-15). "Wilson's Theory of Critical Phenomena and Callan-Symanzik Equations in 4−ε Dimensions". Physical Review D. 8 (2). American Physical Society (APS): 434–440. Bibcode:1973PhRvD...8..434B. doi:10.1103/physrevd.8.434. ISSN 0556-2821.
- Brézin, E.; Zinn-Justin, J. (1976-03-29). "Renormalization of the NonlinearσModel in 2+ε Dimensions—Application to the Heisenberg Ferromagnets". Physical Review Letters. 36 (13). American Physical Society (APS): 691–694. doi:10.1103/physrevlett.36.691. ISSN 0031-9007.
- Brézin, E.; Itzykson, C.; Parisi, G.; Zuber, J. B. (1978). "Planar diagrams". Communications in Mathematical Physics. 59 (1). Springer Science and Business Media LLC: 35–51. Bibcode:1978CMaPh..59...35B. doi:10.1007/bf01614153. ISSN 0010-3616. MR 0471676. S2CID 189831738.
- Brezin, E.; Gross, David J. (1980). "The external field problem in the large N limit of QCD". Physics Letters B. 97 (1). Elsevier BV: 120–124. Bibcode:1980PhLB...97..120B. doi:10.1016/0370-2693(80)90562-6. ISSN 0370-2693.
- Brézin, E.; Halperin, B. I.; Leibler, S. (1983-05-02). "Critical Wetting in Three Dimensions". Physical Review Letters. 50 (18). American Physical Society (APS): 1387–1390. Bibcode:1983PhRvL..50.1387B. doi:10.1103/physrevlett.50.1387. ISSN 0031-9007.
- Brézin, E.; Gross, David J.; Itzykson, C. (1984). "Density of states in the presence of a strong magnetic field and random impurities". Nuclear Physics B. 235 (1). Elsevier BV: 24–44. Bibcode:1984NuPhB.235...24B. doi:10.1016/0550-3213(84)90146-9. ISSN 0550-3213.
- Brézin, E.; Nelson, D. R.; Thiaville, A. (1985-06-01). "Fluctuation effects near H_{c2} in type-II superconductors". Physical Review B. 31 (11). American Physical Society (APS): 7124–7132. Bibcode:1985PhRvB..31.7124B. doi:10.1103/physrevb.31.7124. ISSN 0163-1829. PMID 9935631.
- Brézin, E.; Kazakov, V.A. (1990). "Exactly solvable field theories of closed strings". Physics Letters B. 236 (2). Elsevier BV: 144–150. Bibcode:1990PhLB..236..144B. doi:10.1016/0370-2693(90)90818-q. ISSN 0370-2693.
- Brézin, E.; Zee, A. (1993). "Universality of the correlations between eigenvalues of large random matrices". Nuclear Physics B. 402 (3). Elsevier BV: 613–627. Bibcode:1993NuPhB.402..613B. doi:10.1016/0550-3213(93)90121-5. ISSN 0550-3213.
- Brézin, E.; Hikami, S. (2008-05-29). "Intersection Theory from Duality and Replica". Communications in Mathematical Physics. 283 (2): 507–521. arXiv:0708.2210. Bibcode:2008CMaPh.283..507B. doi:10.1007/s00220-008-0519-0. ISSN 0010-3616. S2CID 13993047.

== Books ==
- The large N expansion in quantum field theory and statistical physics, E Brezin and S Wadia, World Scientific (1993)
- Introduction to statistical field theory, E Brezin, Cambridge University press (2010)

== See also ==
- List of members of the National Academy of Sciences
