= Roger Balian =

French-Armenian physicist (born 1933)

- Born: 18 January 1933 (age 93); Lyon, France

Academic work
- Discipline: physics
- Institutions: École polytechnique
- Main interests: quantum field theory, quantum thermodynamics, and theory of measurement
- Notable works: Balian-Low theorem

Roger Balian (born 18 January 1933) is a French-Armenian physicist who has worked on quantum field theory, quantum thermodynamics, and theory of measurement. Balian is a member of the French Academy of Sciences. His important works include the Balian-Low theorem. He teaches statistical physics at the École polytechnique.

== Works ==
- From Microphysics to Macrophysics. Translated by Dirk ter Haar; John F. Gregg. Springer. 2007. ISBN 978-3-540-45469-4.
- Roger Balian; Jean Zinn-Justin, eds. (1981). Méthodes en théorie des champs. World Scientific. ISBN 978-9971-83-078-6.
- A. Aspect, R. Balian, G. Bastard, J.P. Bouchaud, B. Cabane, F. Combes, T. Encrenaz, S. Fauve, A. Fert, M. Fink, A. Georges, J.F. Joanny, D. Kaplan, D. Le Bihan, P. Léna, H. Le Treut, J-P Poirier, J. Prost et J.L. Puget, Demain la physique, (Odile Jacob, 2009) (ISBN 9782738123053)

== See also ==
- Save the Climate
