= Encrenaz =

Encrenaz may refer to:

- 5443 Encrenaz, a minor planet named for Thérèse Encrenaz
- Pierre Encrenaz (born 1945), French astronomer, married to Thérèse
- Thérèse Encrenaz (born 1946), French planetary scientist, married to Pierre
