= Françoise Combes =

French physicist

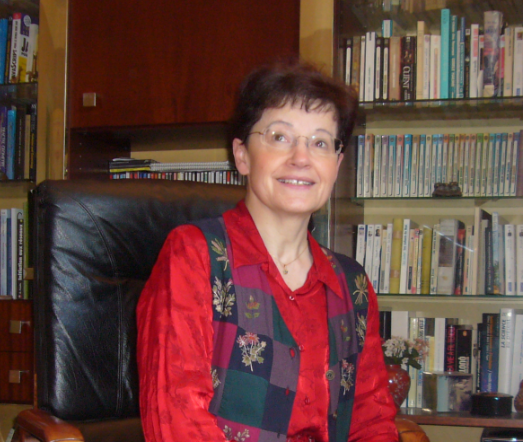
- Born: 12 August 1952 (age 74); Montpellier, France
- Education: École Normale Supérieure; Paris Diderot University
- Awards: CNRS Gold medal, L'Oréal-UNESCO For Women in Science Awards, Prix Jules Janssen
- Scientific career
- Fields: Astrophysics
- Workplaces: Observatoire de Paris
- Doctoral students: Fabienne Casoli

Françoise Combes (French pronunciation: [fʁɑ̃swaz kɔ̃b]; born 12 August 1952) is a French astrophysicist at the Paris Observatory and a professor at the Collège de France where she has been the chair of Galaxies and cosmology since 2014.

Combes became the President of the French Academy of Sciences in 2025.

On 15 September 2017 the 'City of Success' school at Montpellier was renamed as 'High school Françoise Combes'.

== Education ==
Françoise Combes studied at the École normale supérieure from 1971 to 1975. In 1975, she obtained the Agrégation and a PhD in Physics from Paris Diderot University, writing her thesis on the dynamics and structure of galaxies.

== Research ==
Her research works are about galaxy formation and evolution, in a cosmological context. This work includes: galaxy dynamics, their spiral and barred structures, and interactions between galaxies, studied both through multi-wavelength observations and by numerical simulations. Additionally, she has published extensively on the interstellar medium of galaxies. In particular, the molecular gas which gives birth to new stars in nearby galaxies, such as Andromeda, and which can be found in high redshift systems. She has published numerous reviews that range in her areas of interest.

Françoise Combes has contributed to various models of dark matter, and is also interested in alternative solutions, such as modified gravity. She collaborated with Daniel Pfenniger in developing a model to account under the form of cold molecular gas for a large fraction of the dark baryons, which have not yet been identified.

As the President of the French Academy of Sciences, Combes was a member of the commission to develop a list of 72 women in STEM proposed to be added to the 72 men named on the Eiffel Tower.

== Awards and honors ==
- 2026: The Ernst Mach Honorary Medal for Merit in the Physical Sciences (presented by the Czech Academy of Sciences)
- 2023: Oort lecture prize
- 2023: Elected international member of the US Academy of Sciences (NAS)
- 2022: Nick Kylafis Lectureship
- 2022: Karl Jansky Lecturer
- 2021: L'Oréal-UNESCO International Prize for Women in Science 2021
- 2021: American Astronomical Society Fellow
- 2020: Gold Medal of the CNRS
- 2019: Commander of National Order of Merit
- 2017: The school City of Success of Montpellier (France) was renamed as High school Françoise Combes
- 2017: Prix Jules Janssen of the Société astronomique de France, the French Astronomical Society
- 2017: Lise Meitner Prize of the University of Technology CHALMERS in Gothenburg
- 2017: Honorary member of the American Astronomical Society
- 2015: Officer of the French Legion of Honour
- 2013: R.M. Petrie Prize of the Canadian Astronomical Society
- 2013: Honorary Fellow of the Royal Astronomical Society
- 2012: Prix des Trois Physiciens, ENS
- 2009: Officer of the National Order of Merit
- 2009: Member of the Academia Europaea
- 2003: Honorary Fellow of the Royal Astronomical Society, 2013
- 2009: Tycho Brahe Prize of the European Astronomical Society
- 2006: Knight of the French Legion of Honour
- 2004: Member of the French Academy of Sciences
- 2001: Silver Medal of the CNRS
- 1986: IBM physics prize
