= Casoli (surname) =

Casoli is a French and Italian surname. Notable people with the name include:

- Fabienne Casoli (born 1959), French astronomer
- Giacomo Casoli (born 1988), Italian footballer
- Julien Casoli (born 1982), French parathletic sprinter
- Paolo Casoli (born 1965), Italian motorcycle racer
