= Athena Coustenis =

Greek-French astrophysicist

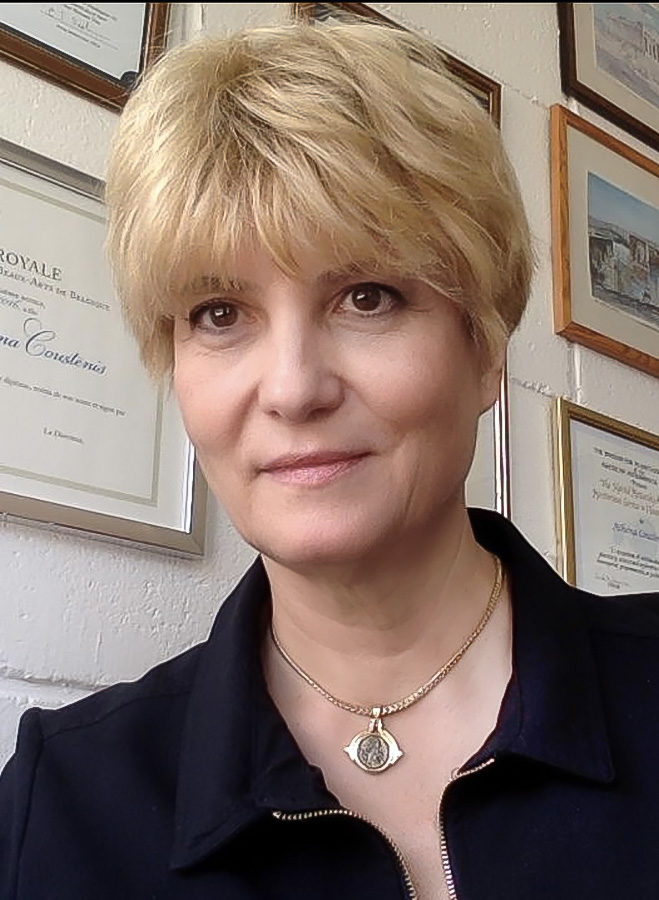
- Athena Coustenis, October 2020
- Born: Athens, Greece.
- Citizenship: French, Greek - dual citizenship.
- Education: Pierre and Marie Curie University (MS, PhD), HDR; University of Paris III: Sorbonne Nouvelle (MA)
- Scientific career
- Fields: Astrophysics; Planetary science
- Website: http://www.CoustenisPlanetologist.com

Athena Coustenis is an astrophysicist specializing in planetology. Coustenis has both French and Greek nationality and is director of research, Centre national de la recherche scientifique (CNRS] French National Center for Scientific Research), at LIRA (Laboratoire d'instrumentation et de Recherche en astrophysique), at the Paris Observatory, Meudon, France. She is involved in several space mission projects for the European Space Agency (ESA) and for NASA. Her research the exploration of the solar system and exoplanets using both space missions and ground-based observatories with a focus on the outer solar system and the moons of the gas giant planets, Saturn and Jupiter.

== Early life and education ==
Born in Athens, Greece, Coustenis moved to Paris, France, where she received a Master's degree in astrophysics and space techniques at the Pierre and Marie Curie University (UPMC), Paris 6, in 1986 and a master's degree in English literature, at the University of Paris III: Sorbonne Nouvelle, in 1987. Coustenis defended her PhD thesis in astrophysics and space techniques, "Titan's atmosphere from Voyager's infrared observations", at the Pierre and Marie Curie University (UPMC), Paris 7, in 1989, where in 1996 she went on to obtain a Habilitation to Direct Research (HDR).

== Career ==
Coustenis worked as senior researcher at DESPA, then at LESIA from 1991 to 2008. From 2008 to the present, Athena Coustenis is director of research with CNRS, first at LESIA and then at LIRA at the Paris Observatory, in Meudon, France. She is involved in several high-level committees of scientific societies, associations and institutions.

Coustenis is currently the Chair of the COSPAR Panel on Planetary Protection; member of the Centre National d’Etudes Spatiales (CNES). She is also or has been involved in several leadership committees of scientific societies, associations and institutions including the European Geosciences Union (EGU, Past President of the PS Division), International Union of Geodesy and Geophysics (IUGG, member of the Bureau), International Astronomical Union (IAU, President of Division F), International Academy of Astronautics (IAA, member of the Board of Trustees), European Planetary Science Congress (EPSC) of , Europlanet (Co-coordinator until 2019), International Space Science Institute (ISSI), and the International Society for the Study of the Origin of Life (ISSOL).[5] She is the President of the SEN-2 Commission of the Belgian FRS-FNRS. She is also the President of the Scientific Council of LE STUDIUM, France.

Coustenis was in particular formerly the chair of ESA's Human Spaceflight and Exploration Science Advisory Committee (HESAC), the president of the IUGG International Association of Meteorology and Atmospheric Sciences (IAMAS: 2011-2015) and of the ESA Solar System and Exploration Working Group (2010-2014). She chaired the Comité d'Evaluation sur la Recherche et l'Exploration Spatiales (CERES of CNES). She has served as the Chair of the European Science Foundation European Space Science Committee (ESF-ESSC) from 2014 until 2020, and as Vice-Chair of the EUROPLANET Society.

== Research topics ==
Coustenis uses ground and space-based observatories to study Solar System bodies with emphasis on the satellites of the giant planets Saturn and Jupiter and exoplanets. She focuses on the astrobiological aspects and the search for habitable worlds in the Solar System and beyond. Her research in comparative planetology use the study of climate changes to further the understanding of long-term evolution on our own planet. She was co-investigator of three of the instruments aboard the Cassini/Huygens mission CIRS, HASI, DISR. In recent years she has been leading efforts to define and select future space missions to be undertaken by the European Space Agency and its international partners. She is science Co-Investigator in future missions like JUICE to the Jovian System, MMX (Martian Moons eXploration) to return samples from Mars’ moon Phobos and ARIEL for exoplanetary spectroscopic studies.

== Publications of books and production record ==
Coustenis, A., Encrenaz, Th., 2025. L’énigme de la vie dans le cosmos : a la recherche d’autres mondes habitables. Eyrolles. ISBN 978-2-416-01904-3

Coustenis, A., Encrenaz, Th., 2013. Life beyond Earth: the search for habitable worlds in the Universe. Cambridge Univ. Press. ISBN 978-1107026179.

Coustenis, A., Taylor, F., 2008. Titan: Exploring an Earth-like World. World Scientific Publishing, Singapore, Eds. ISBN 978-9812705013.

Coustenis, A., Taylor, F., 1999. Titan, the Earth-like moon. World Scientific Publishing, Singapore, Eds. ISBN 978-9810239213.

Coustenis has published or co-authored over 300 scientific papers, articles and encyclopedia chapters.

== Memberships, honours and awards ==
- French order of merit : Legion of Honour (Chevalier de la Légion d’honneur)
- Jean Dominique Cassini Medal & Honorary Membership 2023
- The NASA Group Achievement Award for the Cassini Programme Huygens Atmospheric Structure Instrument (HASI)
- The NASA Group Achievement Award for the Cassini Program Descent Imager Radiometer Spectrometer (DISR)
- The NASA Public Service Group Achievement Award for the Huygens Atmospheric Structure Instrument (HASI)
- The NASA Public Service Group Achievement Award for the Descent Imager Spectrometer radiometer (DISR)
- The ESA Award for making an outstanding contribution to the Huygens Probe.
- The American Astronomical Society awarded Coustenis in 2014 with the Harold Masursky award.
- Member of the Bureau des Longitudes
- In 2017 elected member, International Academy of Astronautics.
- Since January 2018, Associated member of the Royal Academy of Belgium.
- 18101 Coustenis (2000 LF32) is a main-belt asteroid discovered on 5 June 2000 by the Lowell Observatory Near Earth Object Search at the Anderson Mesa Station. It was named after Dr Athena Coustenis, of Paris-Meudon Observatory, France, following a suggestion by Prof. M. Fulchignoni.
