= Pierre Encrenaz =

French astronomer (born 1945)

- Born: September 14, 1945 (age 80); Annecy, France
- Education: École normale supérieure; Université Pierre-et-Marie-Curie (PhD)
- Spouse: Thérèse Encrenaz
- Scientific career
- Fields: Astronomy
- Thesis: Calibration d'une antenne radio: application à quelques mesures absolues (1970)
- Doctoral advisor: Arno Allan Penzias

Pierre Encrenaz (born 14 September 1945) is a French astronomer who is a professor at the Université Pierre-et-Marie-Curie (Paris VI). He was also head of the École doctorale d'Astronomie et d'Astrophysique d'Île-de-France.

He was elected a member of the French Academy of Sciences in December 2000, in the "Universe Sciences" section.

== Biography ==
After secondary studies at the Lycée Berthollet in Annecy, he entered preparatory classes at the Lycée du Parc in Lyon, then at the École normale supérieure in Paris (student, agrégé préparateur, sous-directeur) (1965–1979).

- Graduate thesis: calibration of the Bell Laboratories 1970 antenna (Director Arno Penzias, Nobel Prize 1978)
- State thesis: Measurement of pulsar distance by absorption 21 cm 1972 (Director James Lequeux)

He spent several stays at Princeton and Bell Laboratories (1968–1973). He became an astronomer at Paris Observatory (1979–1991) and at the École normale supérieure (1973–1992).

Pierre Encrenaz was a professor at the Pierre et Marie Curie University and a researcher at the Laboratory for the Study of Radiation and Matter in Astrophysics (UMR8112 Observatoire de Paris-CNRS-université de Cergy-Pontoise-université Paris VI-ENS).

Currently, Pierre Encrenaz is a university professor and emeritus at Paris Observatory.

== Scientific works ==
- Construction of millimetric receivers for ground-based radio telescopes (1972–1980)
- Construction of submillimetre receivers for on-board radio telescopes (stratospheric balloons, satellites) (1980–2020)
- The technologies used began with Schottky diodes, then with superconducting diodes (lead, Niobium) and required the construction of closed helium circuit cryogenerators, the creation of laboratories dedicated to the manufacture of diodes, the assembly of diodes in mixers and their integration into cryogenic systems.
- The last receiver delivered to the European Space Agency for the Herschel satellite HIFI instrument covers the 480/620 Gigahertz frequency band and has performance close to the quantum limit. It operated from 2009 to 2013.
- The instruments developed were used for observations of molecules in the interstellar medium (more than 30 molecules discovered), in comets (MIRO instrument on the Rosetta probe), but also in the Earth's atmosphere (Meteosat model). Attempts to observe primordial molecules (LiH, HeH+, HD) were made with Italian and Swedish colleagues and the participation of Jean-Yves Daniel.

Pierre Encrenaz's scientific work focuses on the physics of the interstellar medium (interstellar molecules, isotopes) in our galaxy and a few nearby galaxies. Installation of a microwave laboratory (superconducting junctions) at the ENS and Meudon to observe the Earth's atmosphere, the atmosphere of several planets and the interstellar medium in millimetres and submillimetres. Several technology transfers have been carried out (cryogenitors, mixers, shottky).

They are divided into three periods:

- Measurement of pulsar distance (1968–1972).
- Study of interstellar molecules (since 1973).
- Construction of radioastronomical receivers (since 1973).

But also:

- Titan Methane Lakes.
- Asteroid emissivity and cometary nuclei.
- Abundance of interstellar molecules and star formation.

He is author and co-author of more than 400 peer-reviewed articles, and two patents, of which are the most recent:

- Coherent subterahertz radiation from femtosecond infrared filaments in air

..., JM Munier, M Gheudin, G Beaudin, P Encrenaz - Optics ..., 2002 - osapublishing.org

- Subsurface properties and early activity of comet 67P/Churyumov-Gerasimenko

..., BJR Davidsson, P Encrenaz, T Encrenaz... - ..., 2015 - science.sciencemag.org

- Herschel* Measurements of molecular oxygen in Orion

..., P Caselli, E Caux, P Encrenaz... - The Astrophysical..., 2011 - iopscience.iop.org

- PDF] Mapping and interpretation of Sinlap crater on Titan using Cassini VIMS and RADAR data

..., RN Clark, M Crapeau, PJ Encrenaz... - Journal of ..., 2008 - Wiley Online Library

- Microwave dielectric constant of Titan-relevant materials

.........P Paillou, J Lunine, G Ruffié, P Encrenaz... - Geophysical..., 2008 - Wiley Online Library

- Cassini RADAR: prospects for Titan surface investigations using the microwave radiometer

........RD Lorenz, G Biolluz, P Encrenaz, MA Janssen... - Planetary and Space ..., 2003 - Elsevier

- Microwave dielectric constant of liquid hydrocarbons: Application to the depth estimation of Titan's lakes

..., J Lunine, R Lopes, P Encrenaz - Geophysical..., 2008 - Wiley Online Library

- Remote sensing of a comet at millimeter and submillimeter wavelengths from an orbiting spacecraft

..., J Crovisier, D Despois, P Encrenaz... - Planetary and Space ..., 2007 - Elsevier

- Titan's surface at 2.18-cm wavelength imaged by the Cassini RADAR radiometer: Results and interpretations through the first ten years of observation

..., SJ Keihm, M Choukroun, C Leyrat, PJ Encrenaz... - Icarus, 2016 - Elsevier

He is the author or co-author of several books:

- Interstellar molecules (Delachaux and Niestlé publisher): 1974.
- Coherent detection techniques at mm and submm wavelength and their applications (École des Houches) in 1976.
- Re-found the university in 2009 (in the process of being translated into English).

== Functions and distinctions ==
- President of the ministerial mechanism "Science at School": provision of experimental teaching materials in secondary schools, organization of the EUCYS, C'GENIAL, International Olympiad of Physics, Chemistry, Biology, Life and Earth Sciences competitions.
- Creation of the ERA 762 CNRS, then of the LA 336 which became a department of the Observatoire de Paris.
- Scientific mission on the "Herschel" satellite.
- Co-investigator on the waves Cassini (Radar) and Rosetta (Miro).
- Distinguished visiting scientist at Cal-Tech/jet propulsion laboratory.
- Holder of the master's degree in "Space and Applications" at the Hanoi University of Science and Technology (IUSTH)
- Member of the French Physical Society, Academia Europaea since 2001.
- Since 2000: Member of the French Academy of Sciences, Section of Universe Sciences.
- A symposium was organized in his honour "Hunt for molecules"

=== Prizes ===
- Antoine d'Abbadie's Prize
- Forthuny Award
- 2003 Three Physicists Prize
- 2004 Tommassoni Prize
- Recipient of 4 ESA (European Space Agency) and NASA Awards (Cassini Radar Miro, Hershel).

== Personal life ==
Encrenaz married Thérèse Encrenaz, another astronomer.
