= Thérèse Encrenaz =

French planetary scientist

Thérèse Encrenaz (née Gounon, born 1946) is a French planetary scientist who "played a leading role in the development of planetology in Europe". Her research concerns extraterrestrial atmospheres, particularly of the planets and comets in the Solar System. She is a research director for the CNRS, emeritus, affiliated with the Paris Observatory.

== Education and career ==
Encrenaz was born on March 10, 1946. After studies at the École normale supérieure de Fontenay-aux-Roses, Goddard Institute for Space Studies, University of Paris, and Paris Observatory, she earned a diplôme d'études approfondies in 1968, a doctorat de troisième cycle in 1969, and, in 1975, a doctorat d'état.

As a director of research for the French National Centre for Scientific Research (CNRS) at the Paris Observatory, she headed the DESPA and LESIA laboratories, and became vice-president of the observatory, before retiring as research director emeritus.

She was editor-in-chief of the journal Planetary and Space Science from 2002 to 2007.

== Recognition ==
Encrenaz is the namesake of asteroid 5443 Encrenaz, discovered in 1991.

She is the recipient of the 1998 CNRS Silver Medal, the 2007 Prix Jules Janssen of the Société astronomique de France, the 2010 David Bates Medal of the European Geosciences Union, the 2014 Prix Deslandres of the French Academy of Sciences, and the 2021 Gerard P. Kuiper Prize of the American Astronomical Society.

She was elected to the Academia Europaea in 2002. She was named a chevalier of the Legion of Honour in 2009, and an officier in 2019.

== Books ==
Encrenaz is the author or editor of many books on planetology including:

- The Solar System (with Jean-Pierre Bibring, Intereditions/CNRS, 1987; translated into English by S. Dunlop, Springer, 1990)
- Infrared Astronomy with ISO (with M. F. Kessler, Nova, 1992)
- Comet Science: The Study of Remnants from the Birth of the Solar System (with Jacques Crovisier, Belin/CNRS, 1995; translated into English by Stephen Lyle, Cambridge University Press, 2000)
- The Outer Planets and their Moons: Comparative Studies of the Outer Planets prior to the Exploration of the Saturn System by Cassini-Huygens (with R. Kallenbach, Tobias Owen, and Christophe Sotin, Springer, 2005)
- Searching for Water in the Universe (Springer, 2006)
- The New Worlds: Extrasolar Planets (with Fabienne Casoli, Springer, 2007)
- Planetary Systems: Detection, Formation and Habitability of Extrasolar Planets (with Marc Ollivier, Françoise Roques, Franck Selsis, and Fabienne Casoli, Springer, 2009)
- Life beyond Earth: The Search for Habitable Worlds in the Universe (with Athena Coustenis, Cambridge University Press, 2013)
- Planets: Ours and Others; from Earth to Exoplanets (World Scientific, 2013)
- The Exoplanets Revolution (with James Lequeux and Fabienne Casoli, EDP Sciences, 2020)
- Planets and Life (with James Lequeux and Fabienne Casoli, EDP Sciences, 2021)

== Personal life ==
Encrenaz is married to Pierre Encrenaz, who is also an astronomer.
