= Fabienne Casoli =

French astronomer

Fabienne Casoli (born 1959) is a French astronomer and academic administrator, the president of the Paris Observatory.

== Education and career ==
Casoli was born in 1959. After study at the École normale supérieure de jeunes filles and earning an agrégation in physics, she completed a Ph.D. in astrophysics with the dissertation Nuages moléculaires, formation d'étoiles et structure spirale on molecular clouds and star formation, directed by Françoise Combes at Paris Diderot University.

She became a director of research for the French National Centre for Scientific Research (CNRS), and successively the scientific director of the Institute of Science of the Universe (INSU), director of the Institut d'astrophysique spatiale (IAS), deputy director and head of science for the CNES (National Centre for Space Studies). She was elected president of the Paris Observatory for 2020–2025. She became the first woman to head the observatory since its founding in 1667.

== Recognition ==
Casoli was named a chevalier in the Ordre national du Mérite in 2010, and an officier in 2023.

== Books ==
Casoli is an author or editor of books on astronomy including:

- A New Vision Of An Old Cluster: Untangling Coma Berenices (with Alain Mazure, Florence Durret, and Daniel Gerbal, World Scientific, 1998)
- The New Worlds: Extrasolar Planets (with Thérèse Encrenaz, Springer, 2007)
- Planetary Systems: Detection, Formation and Habitability of Extrasolar Planets (with Marc Ollivier, Françoise Roques, Franck Selsis, and Fabienne Casoli, Springer, 2009)
- The Exoplanets Revolution (with Thérèse Encrenaz and James Lequeux, EDP Sciences, 2020)
- Planets and Life (with Thérèse Encrenaz and James Lequeux, EDP Sciences, 2021)
