= Paris Observatory =

Foremost astronomical observatory of France

Paris Observatory - PSL
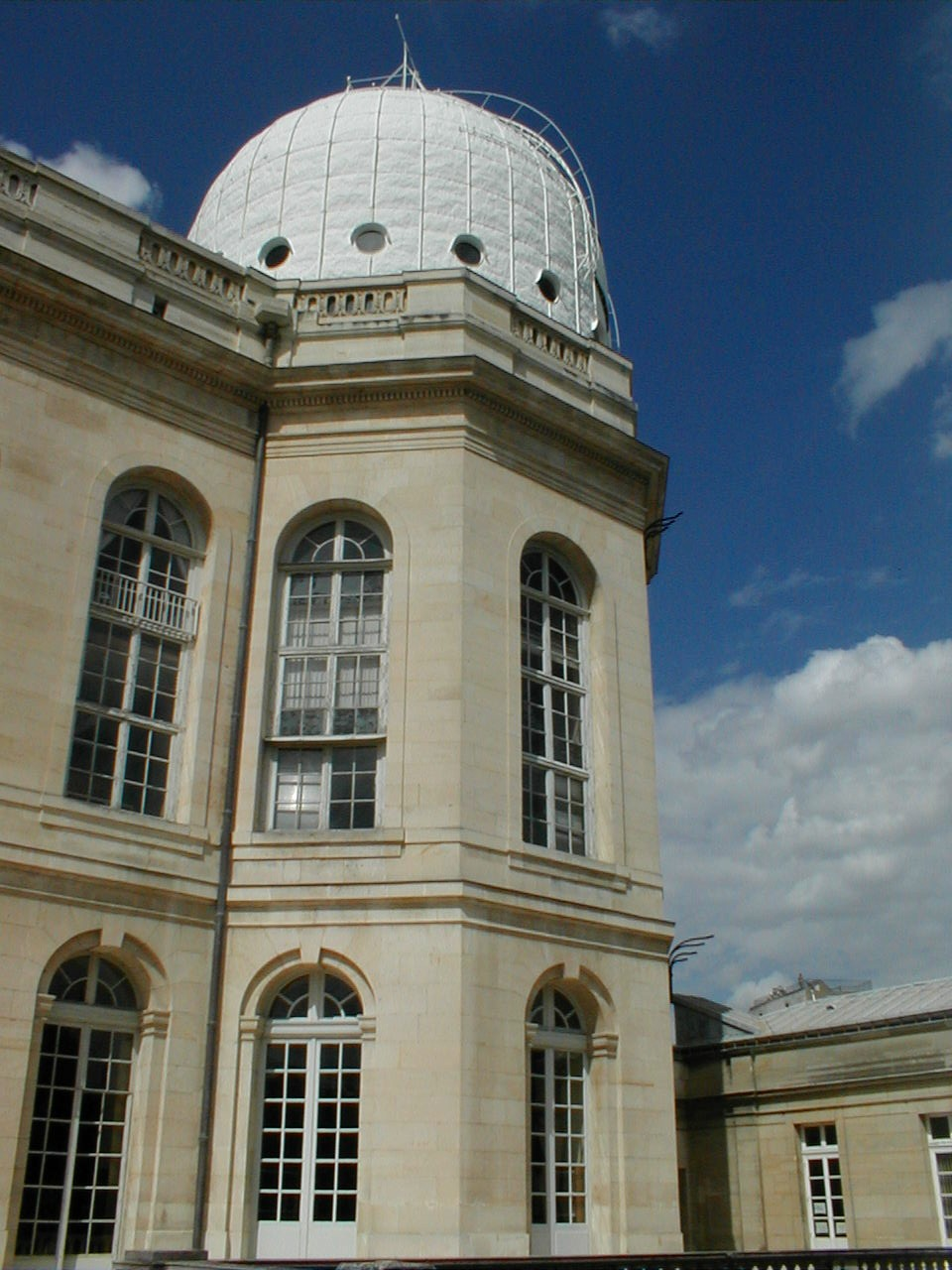

- Alternative names: Observatoire de Paris
- Location: Montparnasse, 14th arrondissement of Paris, Paris, Grand Paris, Île-de-France, metropolitan France, France
- Coordinates: 48°48′18″N 2°14′00″E
- Established: 1667
- Website: www.observatoiredeparis.psl.eu

Telescopes
- East Tower 38 cm (15 in): Equatorial refractor
- Location of Paris Observatory - PSL
- Related media on Commons

The Paris Observatory (French: Observatoire de Paris, pronounced [ɔbsɛʁvatwaʁ d(ə) paʁi]), a research institution of the Paris Sciences et Lettres University, is the foremost astronomical observatory of France, one of the largest astronomical centres in the world, and the world’s oldest observatory still in operation. Its historic building is on the Left Bank of the Seine in central Paris, but most of the staff work on a satellite campus in Meudon, a suburb southwest of Paris.

The Paris Observatory was established in 1667 as part of a project to create a state-of-the-art astronomical observatory equipped with advanced instruments for mapping the skies and aiding navigation. Complementing the French Royal Academy of Sciences founded the previous year, it became a cornerstone of Western astronomy. It was here that fields such as geodesy, cartography, and meteorology flourished in France. King Louis XIV's minister of finance organized a "scientific powerhouse" to increase understanding of astronomy, maritime navigation, and science in general.

Through the centuries the Paris Observatory has continued in support of astronomical activities, and in the 21st century connects multiple sites and organizations, supporting astronomy and science, past and present.

== Constitution ==
Administratively, it is a grand établissement of the French Ministry of National Education, with a status close to that of a public university. Its missions include:

- Research in astronomy and astrophysics
- Education (four graduate programs, Ph.D. studies)
- Diffusion of knowledge to the public

It maintains a solar observatory at Meudon and a radio astronomy observatory at Nançay. It was also the home to the International Time Bureau until its dissolution in 1987. It remains the source of legal time in France, using multiple atomic fountain clocks maintained by its SYRTE (Systèmes de Référence Temps Espace) department. The Paris Observatory Library, which was founded in 1785, provides the researchers with documentation and preserves the ancient books, archives, and heritage collections of the institution. Many collections are available online.

== History ==
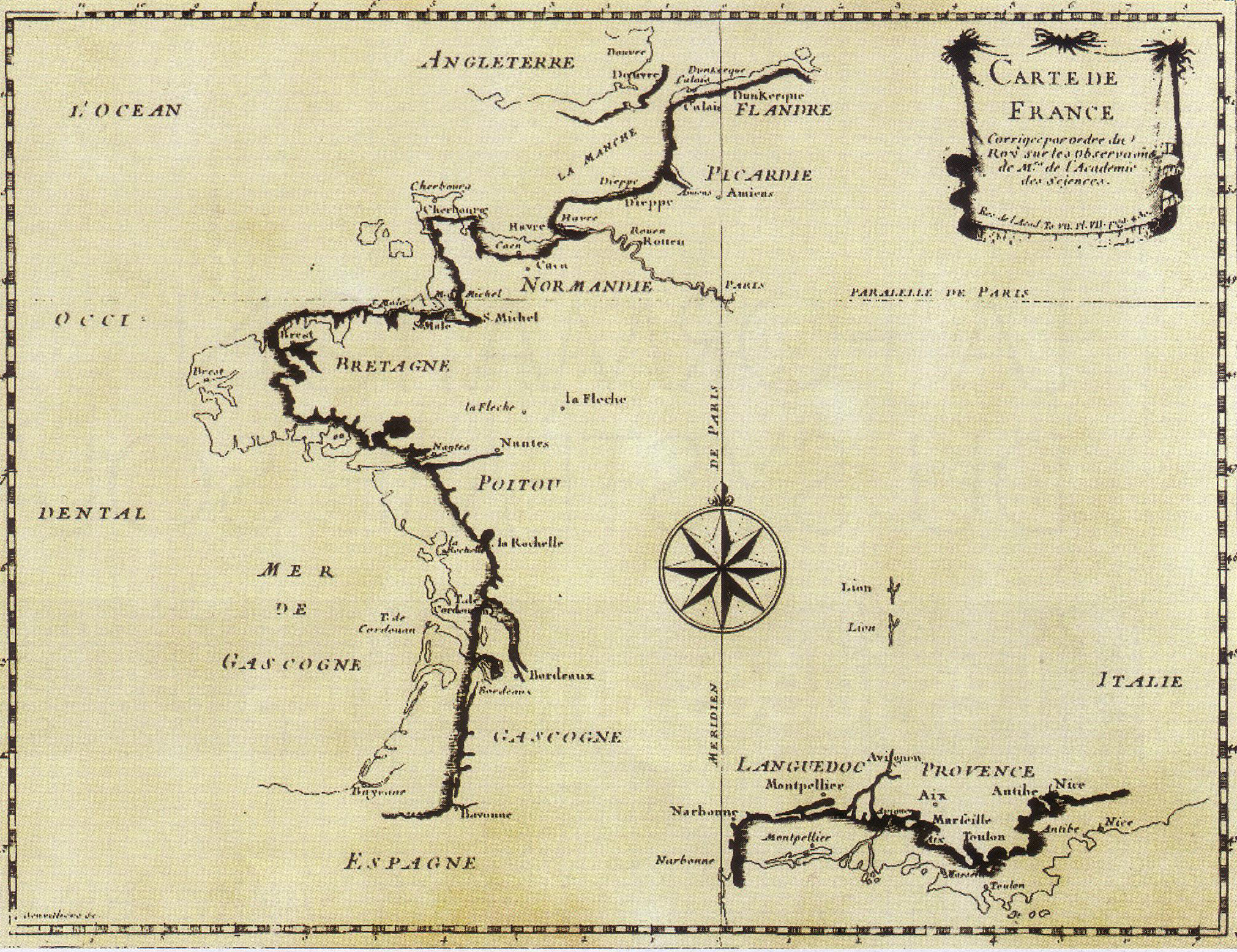
A 1682 map shows corrections to the coast of France

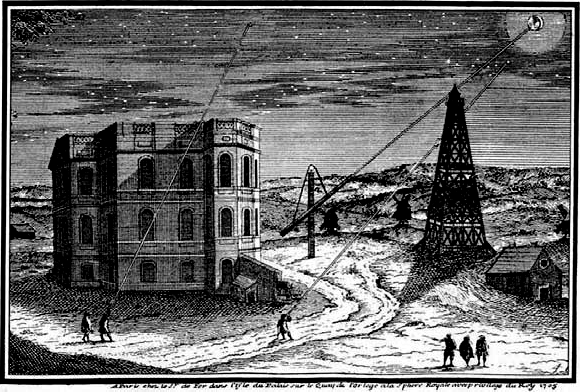
The Paris Observatory at the beginning of the eighteenth century, with the wooden "Marly Tower" on the right, a remnant of the Machine de Marly moved to the grounds by Giovanni Cassini, for the mounting of long-tubed telescopes and even longer tubeless aerial telescopes.

Under pressure from many scholars—most notably Adrien Auzout, who wrote to the Sun King in 1665 urging the immediate creation of a company dedicated to science and the arts—Louis XIV and its Minister of Finance Jean-Baptiste Colbert established the Royal Academy of Sciences in 1666.

The Paris Observatory was proposed in 1665–1666 by the Academy of Sciences. In 1666, King Louis XIV authorized the building of the Observatory. On Midsummer's Day 1667, members of the Academy of Sciences traced the future building's outline on a plot outside town near the Port-Royal Abbey, with the Paris meridian exactly bisecting the site north–south. The meridian line was used as a basis for navigation and would be used by French cartographers as their prime meridian for more than 200 years.

The Paris Observatory predates by a few years the Royal Greenwich Observatory in England, which was founded in 1675. The English philosopher John Locke visited the Paris Observatory on 28 August 1677, which he recorded in his journal: "At the Observatory we saw the Moon in a twenty-two foot glass, and Jupiter, with his satellites, in the same. The most remote was on the east, and the other three on the west. We also saw Saturn and his ring, in a twelve-foot glass, and one of his satellites. Monsieur Cassini told me, that the declination of the needle at Paris is about two and a half degrees to the west."

The architect of the Paris Observatory was Claude Perrault whose brother, Charles, was secretary to Jean-Baptiste Colbert and superintendent of public works. Optical instruments were supplied by Giuseppe Campani. Construction of the Observatory was completed in 1671, though the buildings were extended in 1730, 1810, 1834, 1850, and 1951. The last extension incorporates the Meridian Room designed by Jean Prouvé.

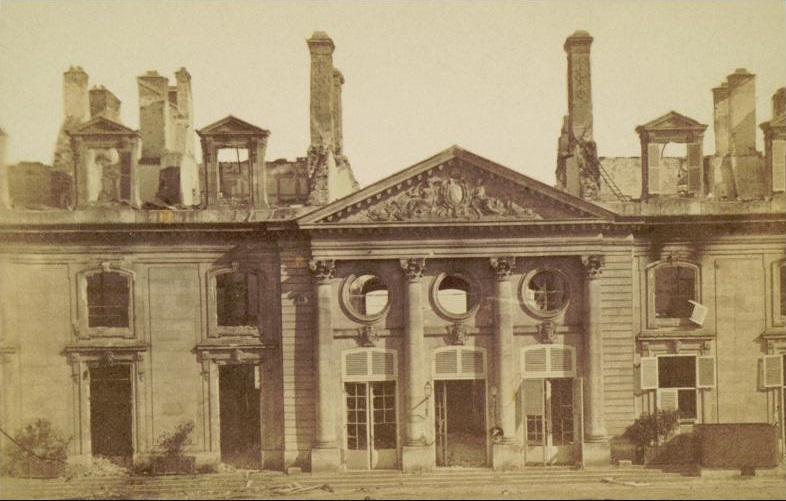
The Château-Neuf at Meudon in 1871, after the fire

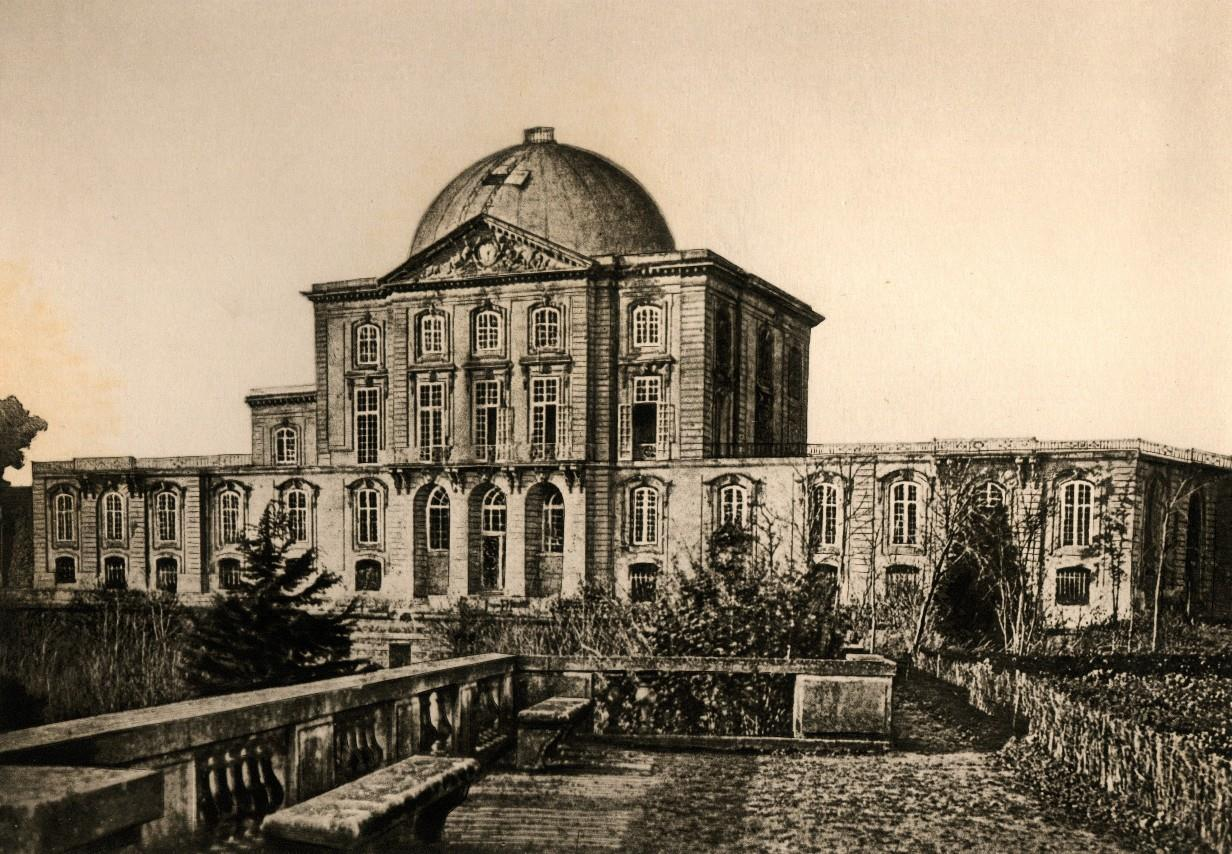
Project for a dome in the heart of the Château-Neuf, never built. Circa 1880

=== Accomplishments ===
In 1671 Saturn's moon Iapetus was discovered from the observatory, followed by Rhea in 1672. The moons Dione and Tethys were also discovered from the observatory in 1684. In 1676 the staff concluded that light itself was travelling at a finite speed.

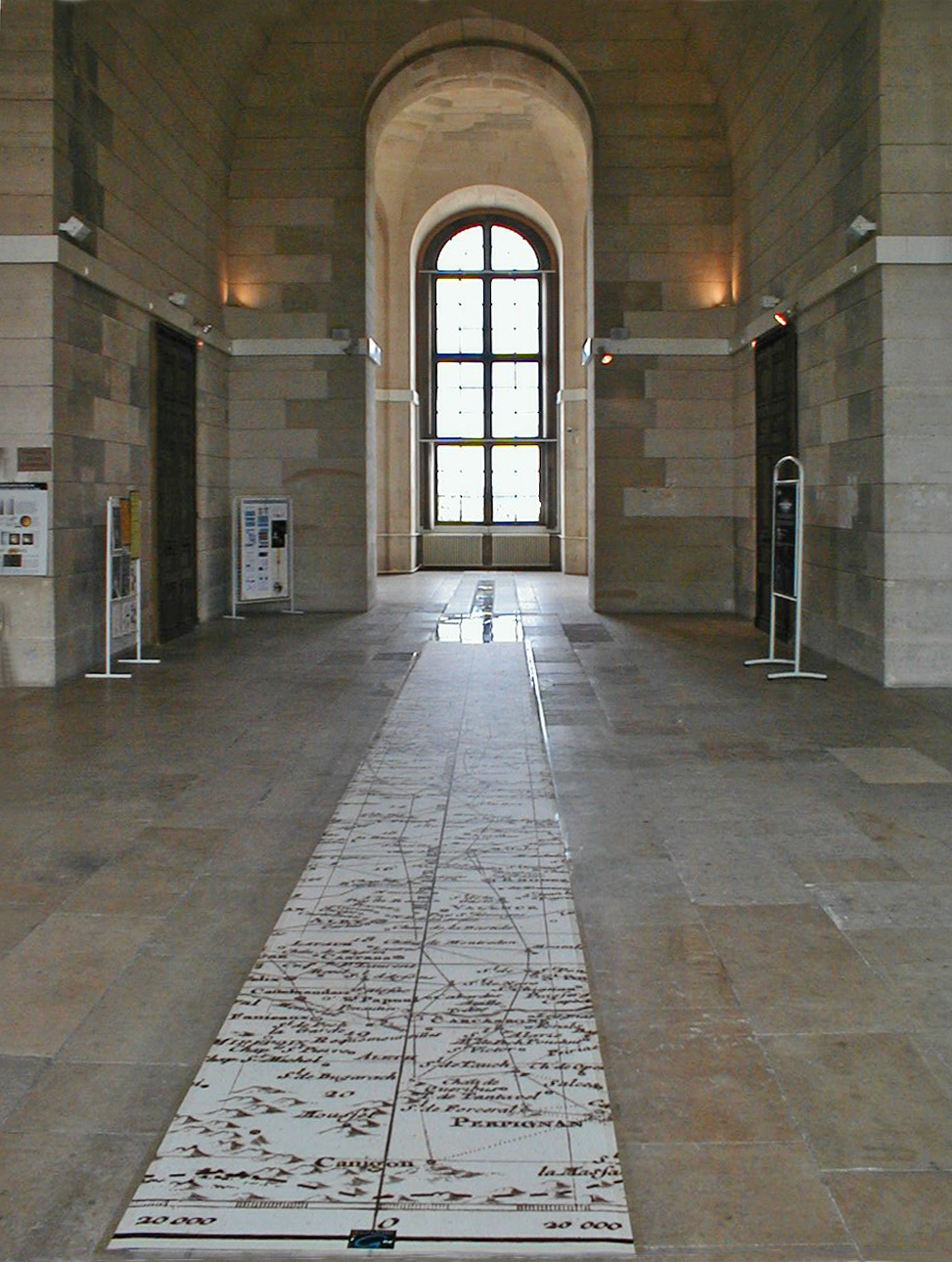
The Meridian Room (or Cassini Room) at the Paris Observatory. The Paris Meridian is traced on the floor.

The world's first national almanac, the Connaissance des temps, was published by the Observatory in 1679, using eclipses in Jupiter's satellites to aid sea-farers in establishing longitude. In 1863, the observatory published the first modern weather maps. In 1882, a 33 cm (13 in) astrographic lens was constructed, an instrument that catalysed what proved to be the over-ambitious international Carte du Ciel project.

In November 1913, the observatory used the Eiffel Tower as an antenna, exchanged sustained radio signals with the United States Naval Observatory in Washington, D.C., to determine the exact difference of longitude between the two institutions.

=== Heritage ===
The Paris Observatory library preserves a great number of original works and letters of the Observatory and well known astronomers. The entire collection has been inventoried in an online archive called Calames. Some of the work is now digitized on the digital library such as those of Johannes Hevelius, Jérôme Lalande and Joseph-Nicolas Delisle.

== Directors and staff ==
The title of Director of the Observatory was officially given for the first time to César-François Cassini de Thury by a Royal brevet dated November 12, 1771. However, the important role played by his grandfather and father in this institution during its first century actually gave them somewhat the role of Director.

The observatory did not have a recognised Director until 1771, before that each member could do as they pleased. Sometimes Giovanni Cassini (1671–1712) and Jacques Cassini (1712–1756) are listed as "Directors" retrospectively. The same goes for François Arago, who also was not actually a Director although he did have a de facto position of leadership and is often credited as such.

The current President of the Observatory is Fabienne Casoli.

- César-François Cassini de Thury (1756–1784)
- Dominique, comte de Cassini (1784–1793)
- Joseph Jérôme Lefrançais de Lalande (1795–1800)
- Pierre Méchain (1800–1804)
- Jean Baptiste Joseph Delambre (1804–1822)
- Alexis Bouvard (1822–1843)
- François Arago (1843–1853)
- Urbain Le Verrier (1854–1870)
- Charles-Eugène Delaunay (1870–1873)
- Urbain Le Verrier (1873–1877)
- Amédée Mouchez (1878–1892)
- Félix Tisserand (1892–1896)
- Maurice Loewy (1896–1907)
- Benjamin Baillaud (1908–1926)
- Henri-Alexandre Deslandres (1926–1929)
- Ernest Esclangon (1929–1944)
- André Danjon (1945–1963)
- Jean-François Denisse (1963–1967)
- Jean Delhaye (1967–1971)
- Raymond Michard (1971–1976)
- Jacques Boulon (1976–1981)
- Pierre Charvin (1981–1991)
- Michel Combes (1991–1999)
- Pierre Couturier (1999–2003)
- Daniel Egret (2003-2011)
- Claude Catala (2011–2020)
- Fabienne Casoli (2020–present)

== Facilities ==
The first site was the Paris headquarters established in 1667 by King Louis XIV of France. This facility had various work done on it over the centuries, and in 1927 the Meudon Observatory was added, which included a new site and facilities. It was built in 1891.

In addition to these sites, the Marseilles Observatory became a branch of the Paris Observatory in 1863. In 1873, Marseilles Observatory detached from Paris Observatory.

=== Paris ===
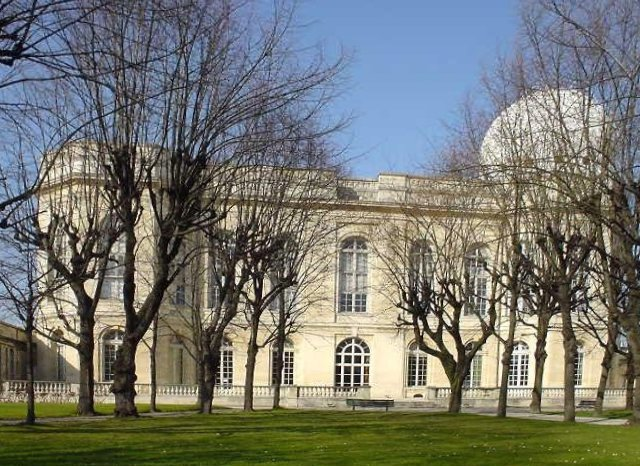
Paris Observatory

King Louis XIV purchased the land for his new observatory in March 1667. This provided a site for the activities of the Academy of Sciences near to the city of Paris. The original buildings was designed by Claude Perrault. A dome and terrace was added in 1847.

=== Meudon ===
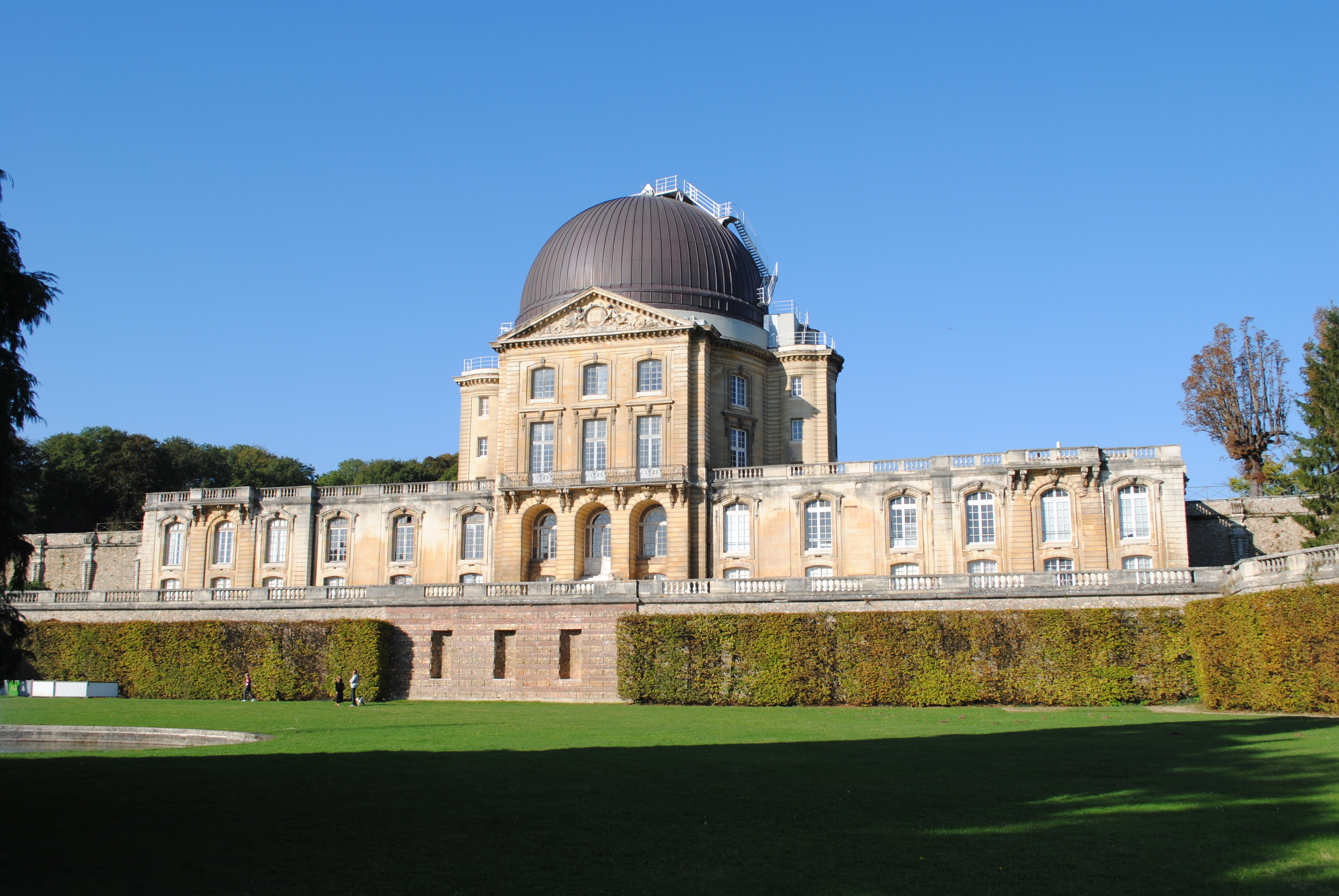
The great refractor of Meudon overlooking the facilities' gardens

The Meudon site was constructed in the late 19th century by Jules Janssen, one of the discoverers of helium. With a million francs and permission to build on the ruins of the old royal palace, he constructed one of the grandest observatories of its day, with a focus on astronomy and solar physics. After World War I, the observatory was integrated with the nearby Paris Observatory and became an important campus for that observatory. Even into the 21st century solar observations are conducted at the Meudon site, and the preserved Great Refractor (Grande lunette) and astronomical gardens overlooking the city of Paris have delighted visitors for decades. The site includes:

- Solar Observatory Tower Meudon
- Chateau de Meudon
- LESIA space and astrophysics instrumentation research laboratory

=== Nançay ===
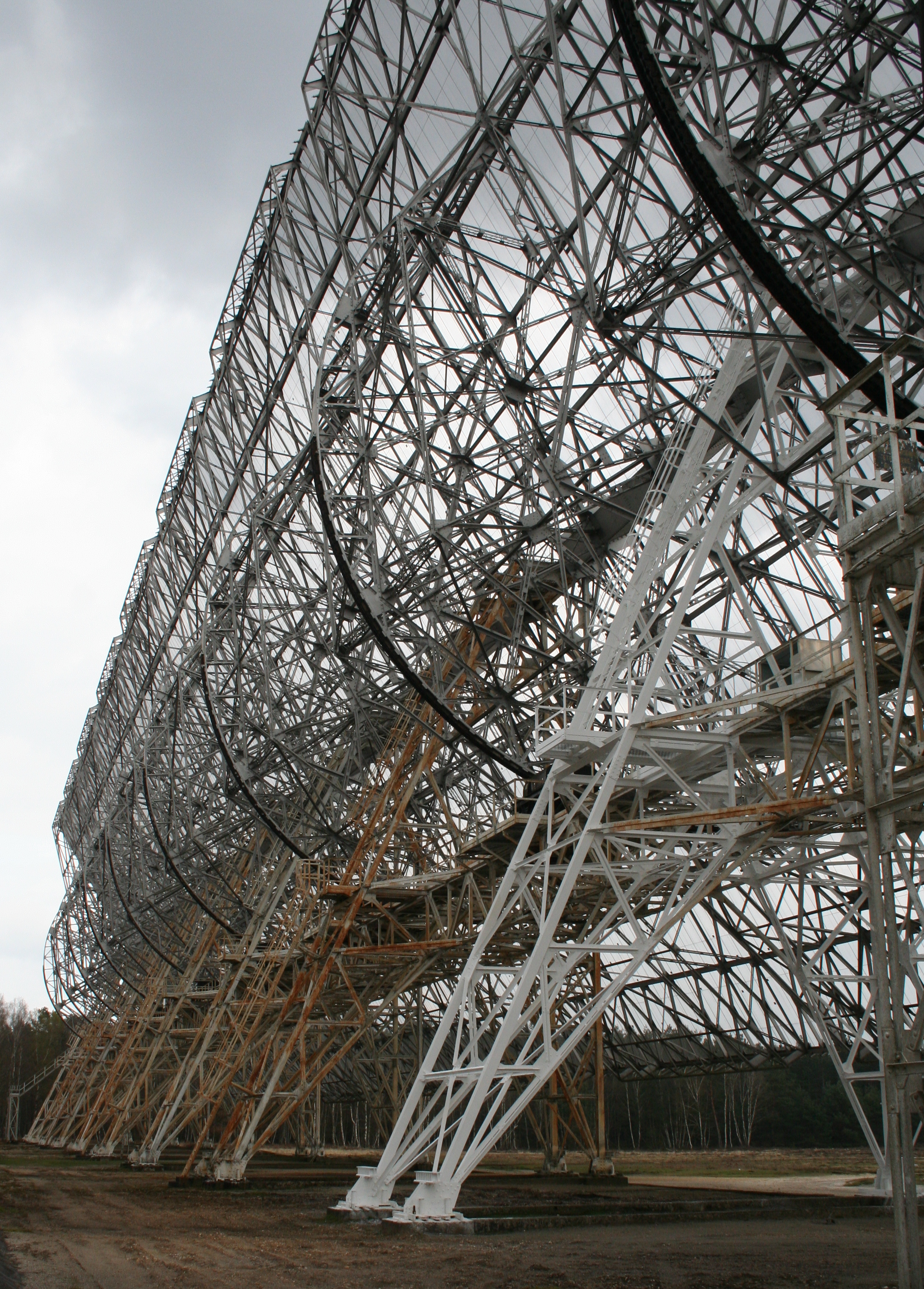
Nançay radar antenna

After the Second World War, French astronomers began designing and building instruments for radio astronomy. A field station was established in 1953, and by the late 1950s several radio instruments were established. In 1965 the Nançay radio telescope was established, a design equivalent to an almost 100-metre dish.

=== Saint-Véran ===
Also known as the Observatoire du Pic de Château Renard, the Observatoire de Saint-Véran was built in 1974 on top of the Pic de Château Renard (2,900 m or 9,500 ft), in the commune of Saint-Véran in the Haut Queyras (Hautes Alpes département). A coronograph was in operation there for ten years; the dome was moved there from the Perrault building of the Observatoire de Paris.

Nowadays, the AstroQueyras amateur astronomy association operates the facility, using a 60 cm (24 in) telescope on loan from the Observatoire de Haute Provence. Numerous asteroids have been discovered there.

== Instruments past and present ==
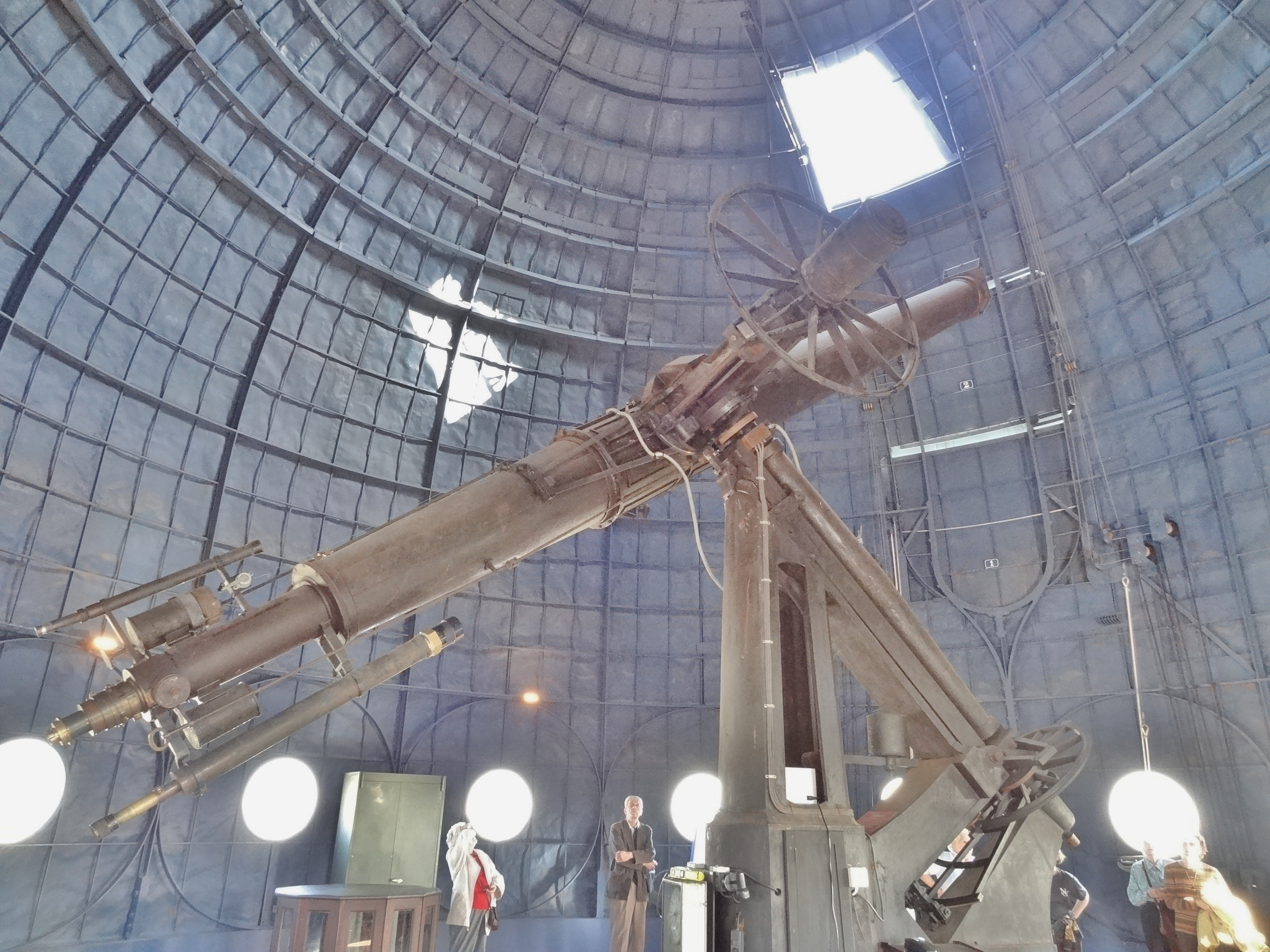
The Arago equatorial telescope (38 cm/ 15 inch aperture)

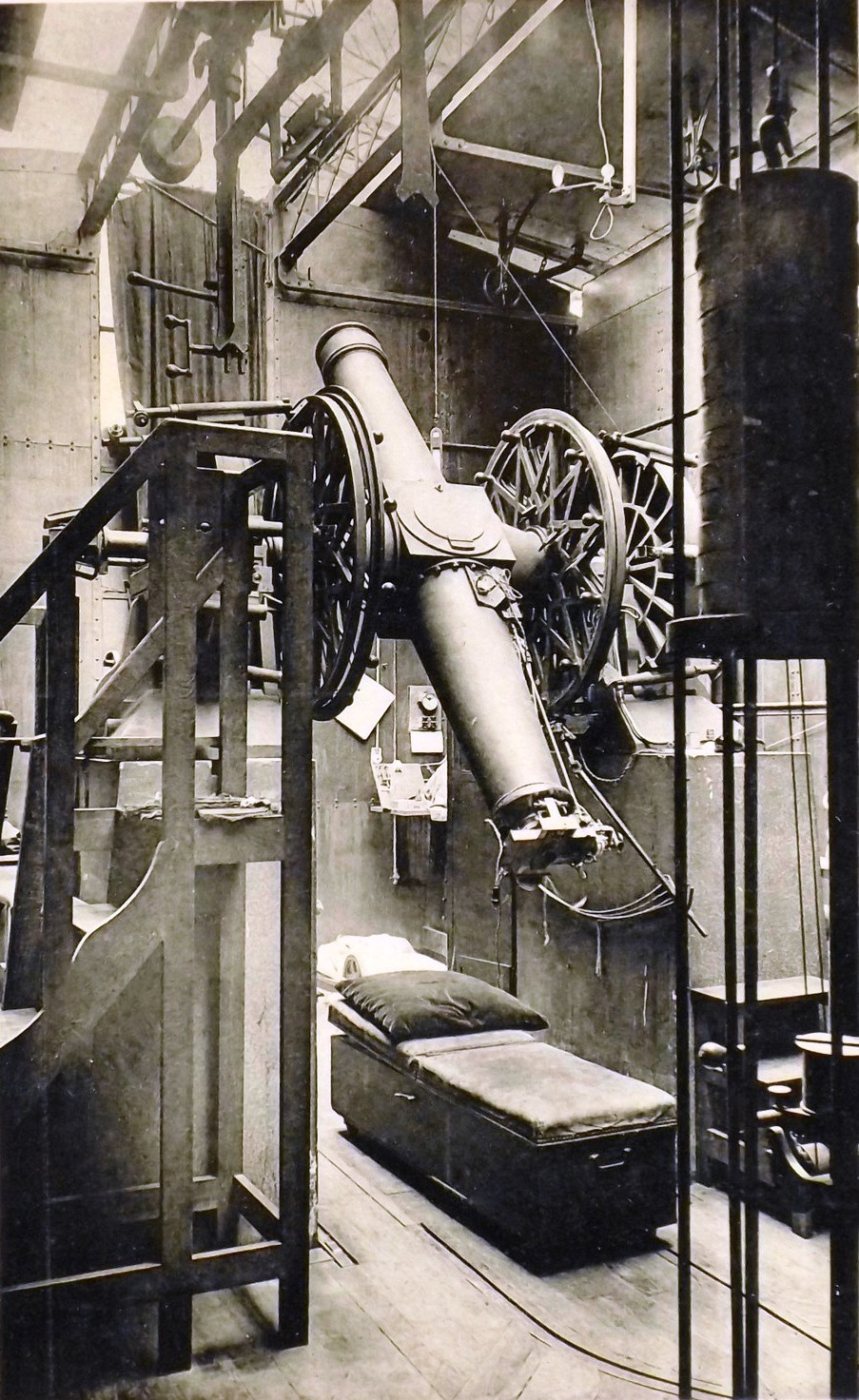
A meridian instrument of the Observatory

Early telescopes were supplied by the famed craftsman Giuseppe Campani. Cassini, an astronomer who worked in the early days of the Observatory, had used Campani's telescopes in the 1660s, and continued to do so when he moved to the Paris Observatory.

The Marly tower, moved to the observatory in 1685 for mounting telescopes, was demolished in 1705. The Marly tower was originally made for the Versailles water supply system (see Machine de Marly), but was moved to the southern gardens area near the Paris Observatory. The tower could hold the objective lens for extremely long focal length aerial telescopes.

In 1732 a quadrant instrument made by Langlois was established at the Observatory.

In 1804 a telescope of 8.4 cm aperture, made by Bellet, was established on the roof of the observatory. In 1807 a Short reflector telescope was acquired, and there were several instruments available including a 9 cm aperture Dollond telescope, and a telescope by Lerebours.

One of the special telescopes in the collection of the observatory, was the Passy telescope of King Louis XV. This telescope was built by Dom Noel in the late 18th century, and was a reflecting telescope with a 61 cm aperture bronze mirror. In 1805 the mirror was re-polished, but it was tarnished again within two years; it remained at the Observatory until it was dismantled in 1841.

A Lerebours telescope of 24.4 cm aperture was installed in 1823, at a cost of 14,500 francs. In 1835 Arago used this telescope to observe the return of Halley's Comet that year.

In 1837 the Gambey mural circle was installed, and also a transit instrument, also by Gambey.

In 1857 a refracting telescope of 38 centimetres (14.96 in) aperture objective, the Arago equatorial telescope, was completed. This telescope was proposed by director François Arago in 1846. It was installed in the east tower and was made by Lerebours. This instrument is known to have conducted photometry measurements of Jupiter's moons (there were only four known at that time) in the late 1880s.

In 1863 a large transit circle was installed, and in 1878 a meridian instrument. The transit circle of 1863 was made by Secretan and Eichens.

In 1875 a 120 cm aperture silver-on-glass reflecting telescope was built, for 400,000 francs.

This 120 cm diameter aperture telescope was a silvered glass mirror polished by Martin. However, when it was mounted it was realized the gravity altered its shape because of the mirror's weight, thus causing an image quality issue.

In 1886 a Henry astrograph with 13-inch objective was acquired.

For the 1907 Transit of Mercury, some of the telescopes used at the Paris Observatory included:

- Foucault-Eichens reflector (40 cm (16 in) aperture)
- Foucault-Eichens reflector (20 cm (7.9 in) aperture)
- Martin-Eichens reflector (40 cm (16 in) aperture)
- Several small refractors

The telescopes were mobile and were placed on the terrace for the observations.

=== Meudon 83-cm Great Refractor ===
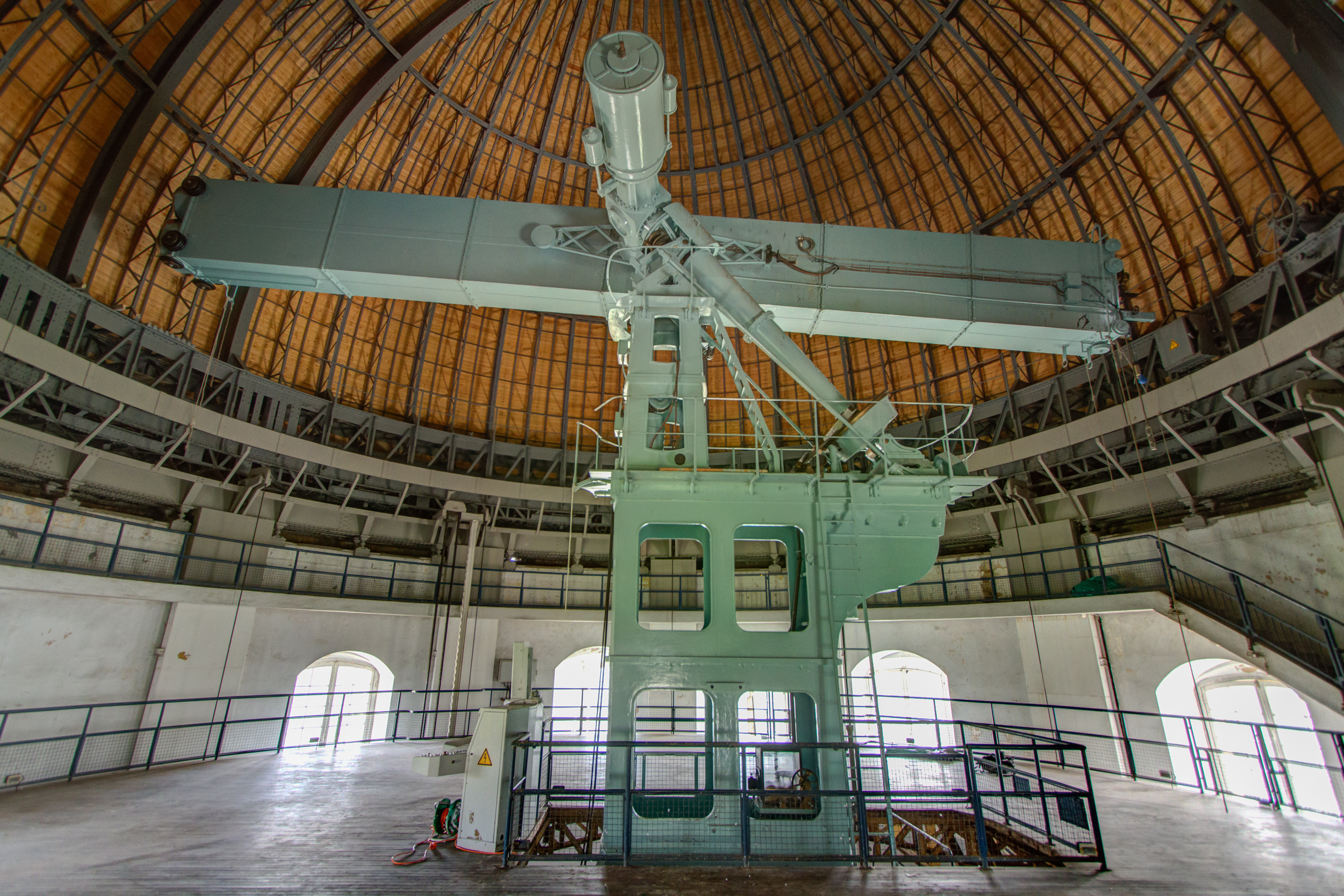
The Grande Lunette of Meudon Observatory (France), is a double refractor with both an 83 cm and 62 cm aperture objective lenses on one shaft. It was installed in 1891.

The Meudon great refractor (Meudon 83-cm) is an 83 cm (33 in) aperture refractor, which, with September 20, 1909 observations by E. M. Antoniadi, helped disprove the Mars canals theory. It is a double telescope completed in 1891, with a secondary 62 cm (24 in) aperture lens for photography. It was of the largest refracting telescopes in Europe and was active for a century until 1991. In the 21st century, it was renovated and supports public education and visitation.

The Meudon refractor was built at Meudon Observatory. It is one of three sites of the Paris Observatory; Meudon Observatory became part of the Paris Observatory in 1926. The Meudon Great refractor is the third largest astronomical refractor of its type in the world. The Meudon refractor is located in the Grande Coupole building, which was renovated in the early 2000s.

== See also ==
- Bureau des Longitudes
- List of astronomical observatories
- List of largest optical refracting telescopes

== Bibliography ==
- [Anon.] (2001) "Paris Observatory", Encyclopædia Britannica, Deluxe CDROM edition
- Aubin, D. (2003). "The fading star of the Paris Observatory in the nineteenth century: astronomers' urban culture of circulation and observation". Osiris. 18: 79–100. Bibcode:2003Osir...18...79A. doi:10.1086/649378. S2CID 143773138.
- Guinot, B. (2000). "History of the Bureau International de l'Heure". Polar Motion: Historical and Scientific problems. pp. 175–184. Bibcode:2000ASPC..208..175G.
- Widemann, T., Knobloch, E. (2022). "Aux origines d'une science et d'une sociabilité européennes: l'Observatoire de Paris à 350 ans", 'Archives Internationales d'Histoire des sciences, Vol. 72, N°189, 2022 ISBN 978-2-503-59736-2
