= Brand tribalism =

Marketing concept

A brand tribe is a concept in marketing that refers to ephemeral groups that enable connections among consumers sharing passions or interests. A brand tribe is part of a tribal marketing strategy fostering engagement among consumers, as opposed to emphasizing the functionality of products and services.

== Description ==
The concept of brand tribes or consumer tribes in marketing refers to the development of consumer-to-consumer engagement through the emergence of neo-tribal values such as rituality and group locality. A brand tribe differs from a brand community in which tribes lack long-term commitment to the group, and do not locate their socialization around a single brand. The notion of consumer tribe refers to a multiplicity of commercial and non-commercial social groupings, characterized as impermanent, fluid, and ephemeral.

The concept of brand tribes or consumer brands originates in the sociological theory on neotribalism proposed by Michel Maffesoli in his book "The Time of the Tribes" published in 1988. The neo-tribalism theory posits that people evolved to live in a tribe-like society and thus form social networks that resemble those of a tribe. As O'Riley discussed in a Marketing Theory article, Maffesoli's notion of neo-tribalism has been incorporated into marketing research and branding practice to describe ephemeral and self-elective groups of consumers

== Limitations ==
Much in this area is still under-theorised. Academics have explored and discussed the degree of connectedness between consumers and brands and the implications for post-modern organisations and consumption.
