= Subculture =

Smaller culture within a larger culture

In the sociology of culture, a subculture is a group of people within a cultural society that differentiates itself from the values of the mainstream or dominant culture (or superculture) to which it belongs, often maintaining some of its founding principles. Subcultures develop their own norms and values regarding cultural, political, and sexual matters. Subcultures coexist within mainstream society while keeping their specific characteristics intact.

Since its inception in the English-speaking world (primarily North America and the United Kingdom) during the 1940s–1950s, the concept and study of subcultures was developed in the academic fields of sociology, communication studies, and cultural studies. Examples of subcultures include punks, skinheads, Teddy Boys, mods, rockers, bikers, hip-hoppers, furries, and more. Subcultures differ from countercultures.

== Definitions ==
The Oxford English Dictionary defines subculture, in regards to sociological and cultural anthropology, as "an identifiable subgroup within a society or group of people, esp. one characterized by beliefs or interests at variance with those of the larger group; the distinctive ideas, practices, or way of life of such a subgroup." Some subcultures are formed by members with characteristics or preferences that differ from the majority of society, who generally have a preference for body modifications such as tattoos, punctures, and certain forms of plastic surgery.

As early as 1950, David Riesman distinguished between a majority, "which passively accepted commercially provided styles and meanings, and a 'subculture' which actively sought a minority style ... and interpreted it in accordance with subversive values". In his 1979 book Subculture: The Meaning of Style, Dick Hebdige argued that a subculture is a subversion to normalcy. He wrote that subcultures can be perceived as negative due to their nature of criticism to the dominant societal standard. Hebdige argued that subculture brings together like-minded individuals who feel neglected by societal standards and allow them to develop a sense of identity.

In 1995, Sarah Thornton, drawing on Pierre Bourdieu, described "subcultural capital" as the cultural knowledge and commodities acquired by members of a subculture, raising their status and helping differentiate themselves from members of other groups. In 2007, Ken Gelder proposed to distinguish subcultures from countercultures based on the level of immersion in society. Gelder further proposed six key ways in which subcultures can be identified through their:

1. often negative relations to work (as 'idle', 'parasitic', at play or at leisure, etc.);
2. negative or ambivalent relation to class (since subcultures are not 'class-conscious' and do not conform to traditional class definitions);
3. association with territory (the 'street', the 'hood', the club, etc.), rather than property;
4. movement out of the home and into non-domestic forms of belonging (i.e. social groups other than the family);
5. stylistic ties to excess and exaggeration (with some exceptions);
6. refusal of the banalities of ordinary life and massification.

Sociologists Gary Alan Fine and Sherryl Kleinman argued that their 1979 research showed that a subculture is a group that serves to motivate a potential member to adopt the artifacts, behaviors, norms, and values characteristic of the group.

Contemporary subcultures typically refer to popular culture, including animation, comics, video games, and popular music.

== History of studies ==
The evolution of subcultural studies has three main steps:

=== Subcultures and deviance ===
The earliest sociological studies on subcultures came from the so-called Chicago School, who interpreted them as forms of deviance and delinquency. Starting with what they called Social Disorganization Theory, they claimed that subcultures emerged on one hand because of some population sectors' lack of socialization with the mainstream culture and, on the other, because of their adoption of alternative axiological and normative models. As Robert E. Park, Ernest Burgess, and Louis Wirth suggested, by means of selection and segregation processes, there thus appear in society "natural areas" or "moral regions" where deviant models concentrate and are re-inforced; they do not accept objectives or means of action offered by the mainstream culture, proposing different ones in their place—thereby becoming, depending on circumstances, innovators, rebels, or retreatists (Richard Cloward and Lloyd Ohlin).

Subcultures, however, are not only the result of alternative action strategies but also of labelling processes on the basis of which, as Howard S. Becker explains, society defines them as outsiders. As Cohen clarifies, every subculture's style, consisting of image, demeanour and language becomes its recognition trait. And an individual's progressive adoption of a subcultural model will furnish him/her with growing status within this context but it will often, in tandem, deprive him/her of status in the broader social context outside where a different model prevails. Cohen used the term 'Corner Boys' which were unable to compete with their better secured and prepared peers. These lower-class youths didn't have equal access to resources, resulting in the status of frustration, marginalization, and search for a solution.

=== Subcultures and resistance ===
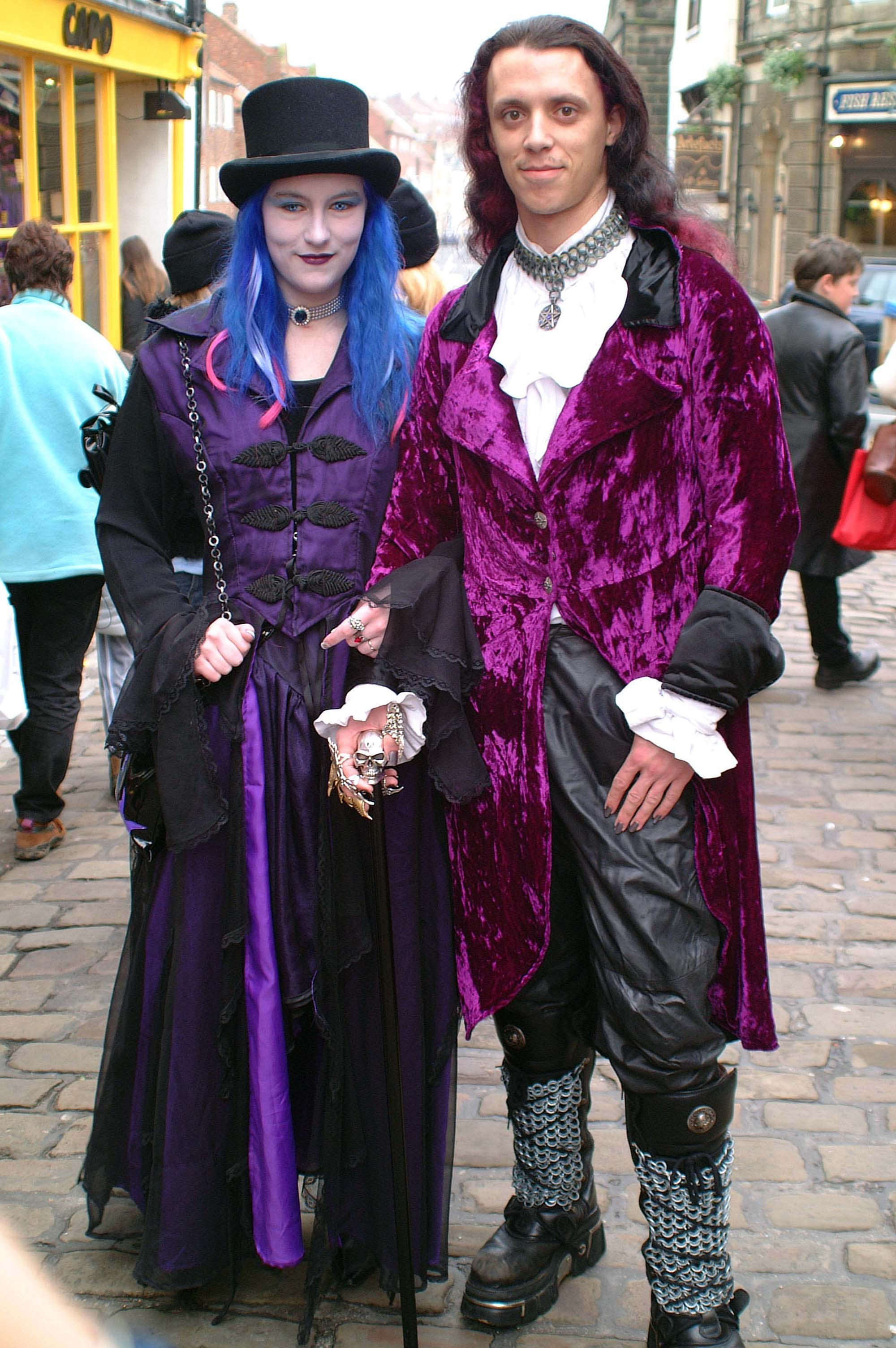
A goth couple attending the Whitby Goth Weekend festival, dressed in typical Gothic Victorian and Elizabethan styles

In the work of John Clarke, Stuart Hall, Tony Jefferson, and Brian Roberts of the Birmingham CCCS (Centre for Contemporary Cultural Studies), subcultures are interpreted as “resistance through rituals”. Society is seen as being divided into two fundamental classes, the working class and the middle class, each with its own class culture, and middle-class culture being dominant. Particularly in the working class, subcultures grow out of the presence of specific interests and affiliations around which cultural models spring up, in conflict with both their parents' culture and mainstream culture. Subcultural groups emphasize voluntary, informal, and organic subordinate relationships formed in unregulated street public spaces. Facing a weakening of class identity, subcultures are then new forms of collective identification, expressing what Cohen defined "symbolic resistance" against the mainstream culture and developing imaginary solutions for structural problems. However, the Birmingham School believes that the symbolic rejection of mainstream bourgeois lifestyles by subcultures is illusory.

As Paul Willis and Dick Hebdige underline, identity and resistance in subcultures are expressed through the development of a distinctive style which, by a re-signification and "bricolage" operation, use cultural goods and services as standardized products to buy and consume, in order to communicate and express one's own conflict. Yet the culture industry is often capable of re-absorbing the components of such a style and once again transforming them into consumer goods for the mass society. At the same time the mass media, while they participate in building subcultures by broadcasting their images, also weaken subcultures by depriving them of their subversive content or by spreading a socially stigmatized image of them and their members.

=== Subcultures and distinction ===
The most recent interpretations see subcultures as forms of distinction. In an attempt to overcome the idea of subcultures as forms of deviance or resistance, they describe subcultures as collectivities which, on a cultural level, are sufficiently homogeneous internally and heterogeneous with respect to the outside world to be capable of developing, as Paul Hodkinson points out, consistent distinctiveness, identity, commitment and autonomy. Defined by Sarah Thornton as taste cultures, subcultures are endowed with elastic, porous borders, and are inserted into relationships of interaction and mingling, rather than independence and conflict, with the cultural industry and mass media, as Steve Redhead and David Muggleton emphasize. The very idea of a unique, internally homogeneous, dominant culture is explicitly criticized. Thus forms of individual involvement in subcultures are fluid and gradual, differentiated according to each actor's investment, outside clear dichotomies. The ideas of different levels of subcultural capital (Sarah Thornton) possessed by each individual, of the supermarket of style (Ted Polhemus) and of style surfing (Martina Böse) replace that of the subculture's insiders and outsiders – with the perspective of subcultures supplying resources for the construction of new identities going beyond strong, lasting identifications.

== Identifying ==
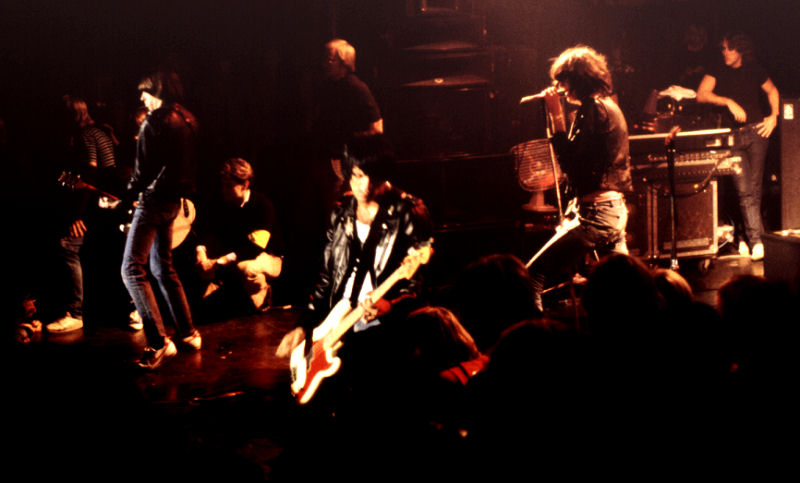
Members of the seminal punk rock band Ramones wearing early punk fashion items such as Converse sneakers, black leather jackets, and blue jeans

The study of subcultures often consists of the study of symbolism attached to clothing, music, hairstyles, jewellery, and other visible affectations by members of subcultures, and also of the ways in which these same symbols are interpreted by members of the dominant culture. Dick Hebdige writes that members of a subculture often signal their membership through a distinctive and symbolic use of style, which includes fashions, mannerisms, and argot.

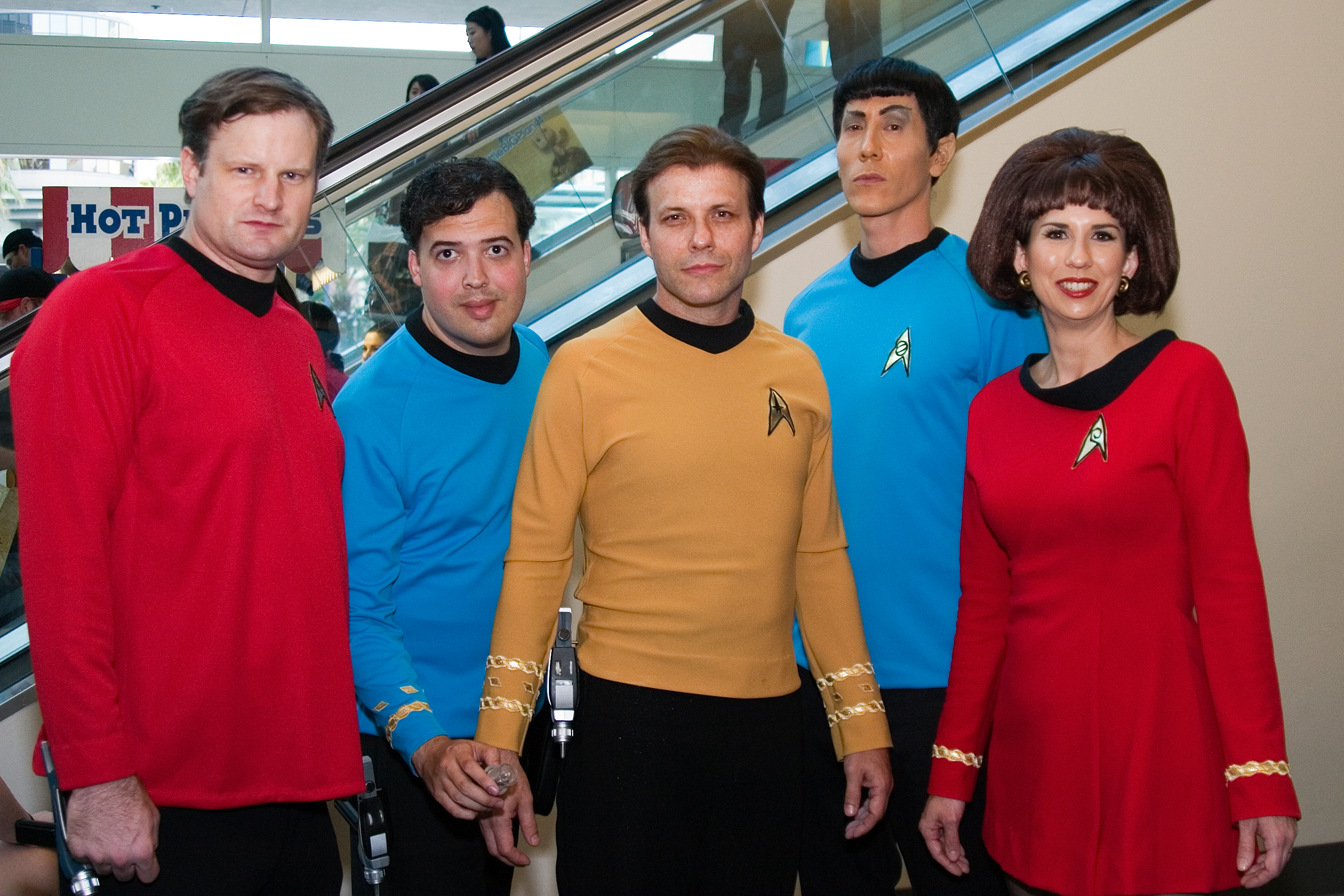
Trekkies are a subculture of Star Trek fans.

Subcultures can exist at all levels of organizations, highlighting the fact that there are multiple cultures or value combinations usually evident in any one organization that can complement but also compete with the overall organisational culture. In some instances, subcultures have been legislated against, and their activities regulated or curtailed. British youth subcultures had been described as a moral problem that ought to be handled by the guardians of the dominant culture within the post-war consensus.

== Relationships with mainstream culture ==
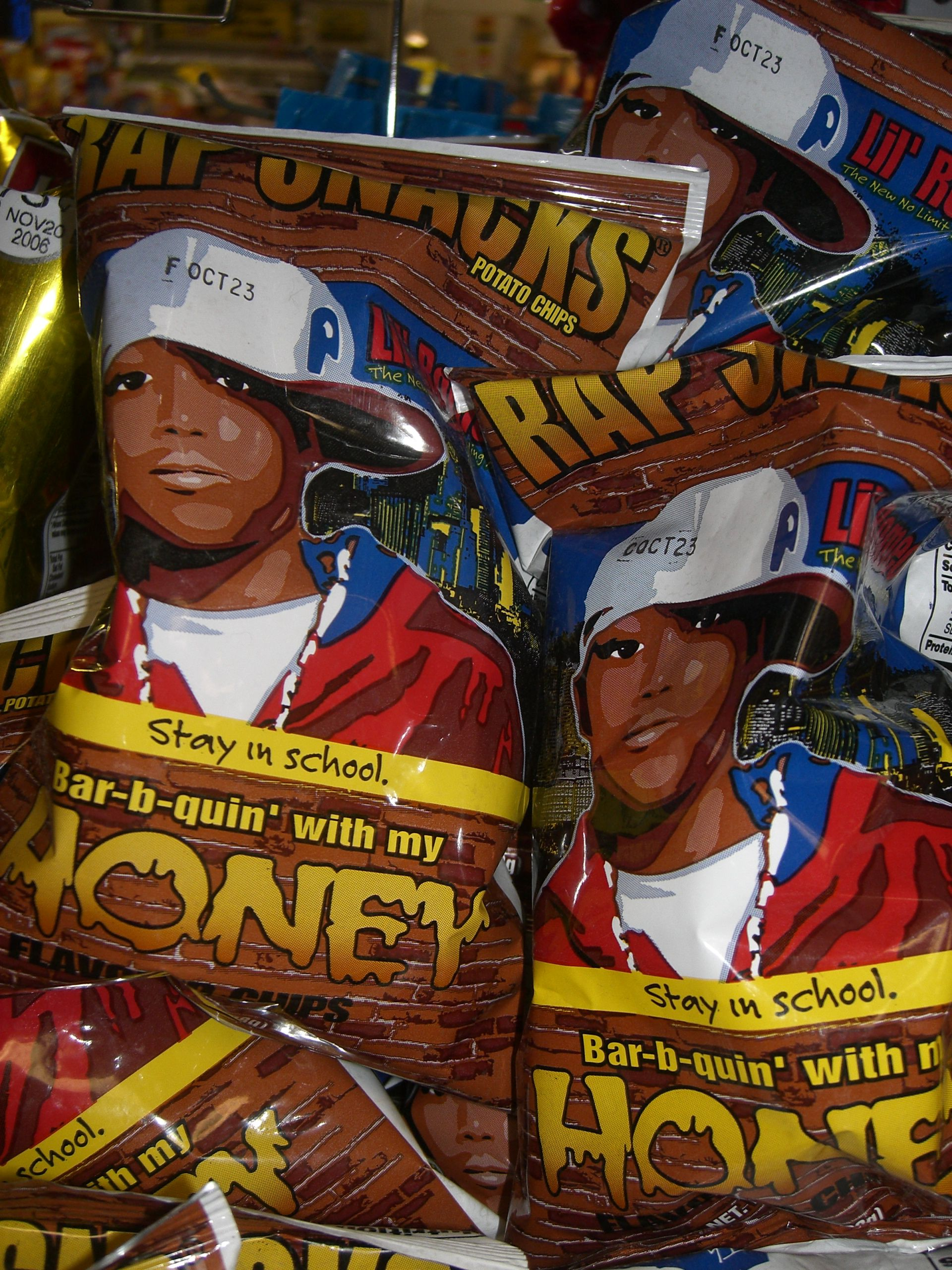
Potato chip packages featuring hip hop subcultural designs in a case of mainstream commercial cultural merging

It may be difficult to identify certain subcultures because their style (particularly clothing and music) may be adopted by mass culture for commercial purposes. Businesses often seek to capitalize on the subversive allure of subcultures in search of Cool, which remains valuable in the selling of any product. This process of cultural appropriation may often result in the death or evolution of the subculture, as its members adopt new styles that appear alien to mainstream society.

Music-based subcultures are particularly vulnerable to this process; what may be considered subcultures at one stage in their histories – such as jazz, goth, punk, hip hop, and rave cultures – may represent mainstream taste within a short period. Even religious groups can be seen as subcultures. In his research on British punk rock in the late 1970s, Hebdige proposed a controversial proposition at the time: punk portrayed the entire history of post-war working-class youth culture in a "cut" form, blending elements that originally belonged to completely different eras. Some subcultures reject or modify the importance of style, stressing membership through the adoption of an ideology which may be much more resistant to commercial exploitation. The punk subculture's distinctive (and initially shocking) style of clothing was adopted by mass-market fashion companies once the subculture became a media interest. Dick Hebdige argues that the punk subculture shares the same "radical aesthetic practices" as the Dadaist and Surrealist art movements:

Like Duchamp's 'ready mades' - manufactured objects which qualified as art because he chose to call them such, the most unremarkable and inappropriate items - a pin, a plastic clothes peg, a television component, a razor blade, a tampon - could be brought within the province of punk (un)fashion ... Objects borrowed from the most sordid of contexts found a place in punks' ensembles; lavatory chains were draped in graceful arcs across chests in plastic bin liners. Safety pins were taken out of their domestic 'utility' context and worn as gruesome ornaments through the cheek, ear or lip ... fragments of school uniform (white bri-nylon shirts, school ties) were symbolically defiled (the shirts covered in graffiti, or fake blood; the ties left undone) and juxtaposed against leather drains or shocking pink mohair tops.

== Urban tribes ==
In 1985, French sociologist Michel Maffesoli coined the term urban tribe or neotribalism. It gained widespread use after the publication of his The Time of the Tribes (1988). In 1996, this book was published in English. According to Maffesoli, neo tribes are microgroups of people who share common interests in urban areas. The members of these relatively small groups tend to have similar worldviews, dress styles and behavioral patterns. Their social interactions are largely informal and emotionally laden, different from late capitalism's corporate-bourgeoisie cultures, based on dispassionate logic. Maffesoli claims that punks are a typical example of an "urban tribe".

In the context of consumer culture, the notion of consumer tribes indicate ephemeral groups of individuals that often share a common interest and a share a subculture. Unlike traditional tribes that share kinship and language, consumer tribes are elective and ephemeral because they disperse without necessarily building long-term relationships. Consumer tribes often fluctuate around a common hobby or interest but lack permanent social bonds to become a brand community.

== Sexual and gender identity-based subcultures ==
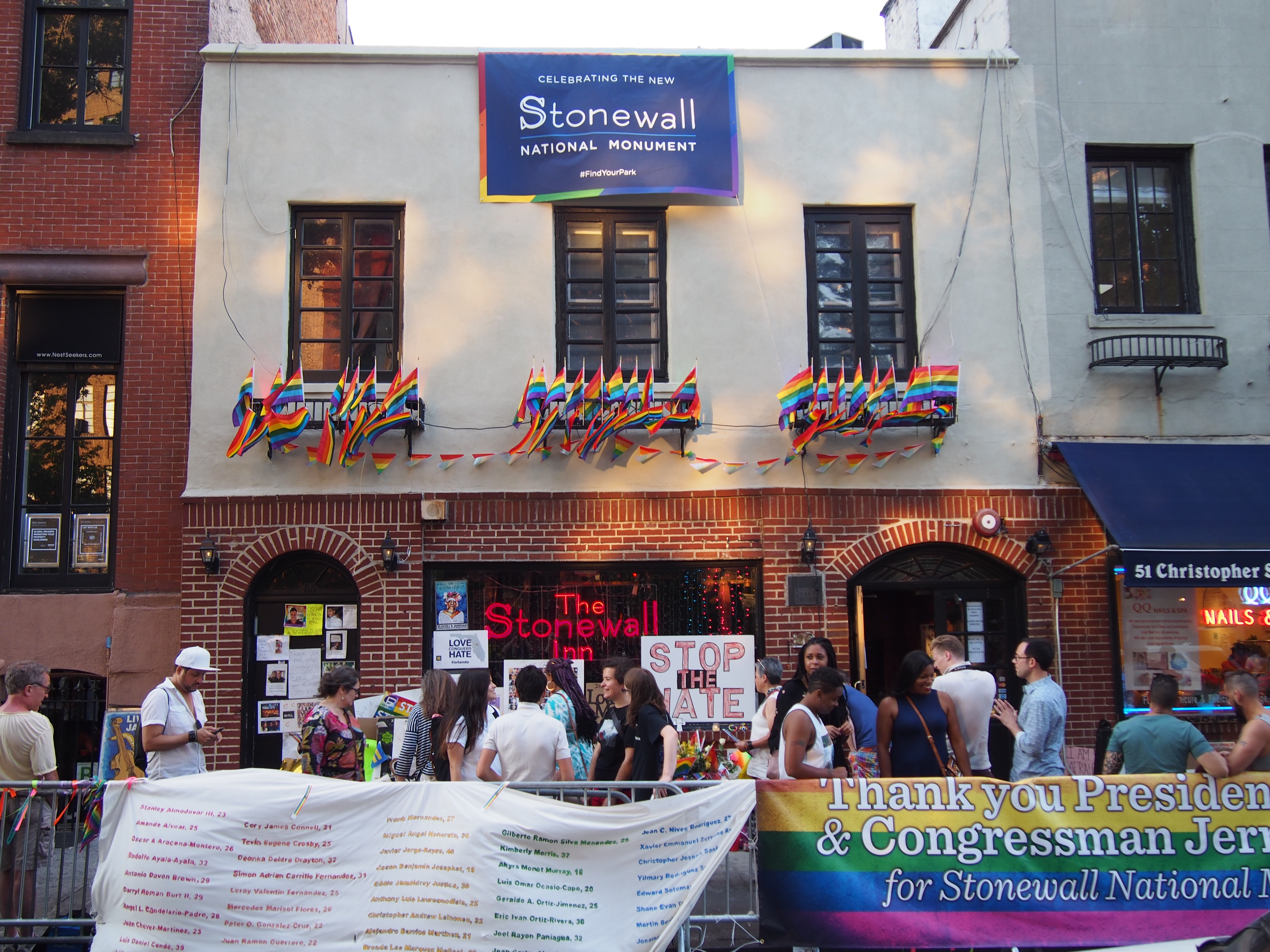
The Stonewall Inn in the gay village of Greenwich Village, Manhattan, site of the June 1969 Stonewall riots, is adorned with rainbow pride flags.

The Sexual Revolution of the 1960s led to a countercultural rejection of the established sexual and gender norms in the Western world, particularly in the urban areas of Europe, North and South America, Australia, and South Africa. A more permissive social environment in these areas led to a proliferation of sexual subcultures—cultural expressions of non-normative sexuality. As with other subcultures, sexual subcultures adopted certain styles of fashion and gestures to distinguish themselves from mainstream Western culture.

Lesbian, gay, bisexual, transgender, and queer (LGBTQ) people express themselves through the LGBTQ culture, considered the largest sexual subculture of the 20th and 21st centuries. With the ever-increasing acceptance of homosexuality in the early 21st century, including its expressions in fashion, music, and design, the gay culture can no longer be considered a subculture in many parts of the world, although some aspects of gay culture like leathermen, bears, and chubs are considered subcultures within the gay movement itself. The butch and femme identities or roles among some lesbians also engender their own subculture with stereotypical attire, for instance drag kings. A late 1980s development, the queer movement can be considered a subculture broadly encompassing the rejection of heteronormativity in sexual behavior while embracing non-binary self-identification and/or non-monogamous forms of intimate relationships, and whose members celebrate visibility and LGBTQ rights activism. The wider movement coincided with growing academic interests in Feminist sociology, queer studies, and queer theory.

Aspects of sexual subcultures can vary along other cultural lines. For instance, in the United States, down-low is a slang term specifically used within the African-American community to refer to black men who usually identify as heterosexual but actively seek sexual encounters and relations with other men, practice gay cruising, and frequently adopt a specific hip-hop attire during these activities. They avoid sharing this information even if they have female sexual partner(s), they are married to a woman, or they are single.

== Social media ==
In a 2011 study, Brady Robards and Andy Bennett said that online identity expression that proliferated through early online communities, including message boards and Usenet groups, has been interpreted as exhibiting subcultural qualities. However, they argue it is more in line with neotribalism than with what is often classified as subculture. Social networking websites are quickly becoming the most used form of communication and means to distribute information and news. They offer a way for people with similar backgrounds, lifestyles, professions, or hobbies to connect. According to a co-founder and executive creative strategist for RE-UP, as technology becomes a "life force", subcultures become the main bone of contention for brands as social networks rise through cultural mash-ups, viral phenomena, and memes on the internet.

Where social media is concerned, there seems to be a growing interest among media producers to use subcultures for branding. This is seen most actively on social media platforms based on user-generated content, such as Facebook, Instagram, TikTok, Twitter, and YouTube. Therefore, subcultures can be and have been successfully targeted by firms for commercial purposes. A stream of academic research in consumer culture shows the multiple ways in which companies and firms target subcultures with commercial offerings.

== Discrimination ==
Discrimination-based harassment and violence are sometimes directed towards a person or group based on their culture or subculture. In the United States and the United Kingdom, the concept of subculture has always been the main explanatory tool for sociological and criminological understanding of deviant behavior. In 2013, the Greater Manchester Police in the United Kingdom began to classify attacks on subcultures such as goths, emos, punks, and metalheads as hate crimes, in the same way they record abuse against people because of their religion, race, disability, sexual orientation or transgender identity. The decision followed the murder of Sophie Lancaster and beating of her boyfriend in 2007, who were attacked because they were goths. In 2012, human rights activists have denounced the occurrence of emo killings in Iraq, which consisted of between at least 6 and up to 70 teenage boys who were kidnapped, tortured, and murdered in Baghdad and elsewhere in Iraq, due to being targeted because they dressed in a "Westernized" emo style.

== See also ==
- Alternative lifestyle
- Anti-globalization movement
  - Alternative globalization
  - Criticism of capitalism
  - Globalization and Its Discontents
  - Indigenous movements in the Americas
- Art world
- Bohemianism
- Brandalism
- Commodification
- Cultural competence
- Cultural identity
- Cultural sensitivity
- Culture jamming
- Folklore
- Heterosociality
- High culture and low culture
- History of modern Western subcultures
- List of subcultures
- Influence of mass media
  - Black propaganda
  - Conspiracism
  - Far-right subcultures
  - Media culture
- Radical chic
- Rainbow Family
- Recreational drug use
  - 1940s hipster culture
  - Cannabis culture
  - Hippie counterculture
  - Rave culture
- Social osmosis
- Sociology of the Internet
- Subcultural theory
- Underclass
- Underground culture
- Urban culture
- Urban sociology
- Youth culture
