= List of programs broadcast by Asian Food Channel =

The following is a list of television programs formerly or currently broadcast by the ‘’’Asian Food Channel’’’.

== Programs ==
=== Australia ===
- Conviction Kitchen
- A Fork in the Road Asia
- A Fork in the Road Australia
- A Fork in the Road Mediterranean
- Good Chef Bad Chef
- Wine Lover's Guide to Australia

=== Canada ===
- Chef at Home (Michael Smith)
- Food Jammers
- The Heat with Mark McEwan
- Licence to Grill
- The Opener
- Restaurant Makeover
- Sugar
- Sugar Christmas Special
- Tablescapes

=== New Zealand ===
- The Filth Files

=== Philippines ===
- The Boss
- Foodie's Choice

=== Singapore ===
- Extreme Gourmet
- Food Glorious Food (pinyin: Dà tōng xiǎo chī)

=== United Kingdom ===
- Christmas Cooks
- Daily Cooks
- The F Word
- The Grape Escape
- Hell's Kitchen
- The Naked Chef
- Nigella Bites
- Ramsay's Kitchen Nightmares
- Saturday Cooks
- Saturday Kitchen

=== United States ===
- Cooking Under Fire
- A Cook's Tour
- Jacques Pépin : Fast Food My Way

=== Others ===
- New Scandinavian Cooking (Norway)
