= Thomas O'Guinn =

American marketing professor

- Education: B.S., M.S., Ph.D
- Alma mater: University of Texas at Austin
- Occupations: Chair, Department of Marketing
- Organization: University of Wisconsin Madison

Thomas O’Guinn is an American marketing professor and an expert in the area of branding and the sociology of consumer behavior, including how viewers create distorted views of consumption behavior and other consumers through media viewing. He co-founded the work on compulsive buying with Ronald J. Faber. He and Robin Tanner and Aerum Maeng were the first to demonstrate that consumers infer social class, income, and the worth of an object for sale simply by the level of crowding or social density in a store. He is the former Irwin Maier Distinguished Chair in Business and Professor of Marketing at the University of Wisconsin-Madison. He also has an appointment in sociology at UW.

== Work ==
Professor O’Guinn researches how social forces and institutions create and attenuate consumer behavior. He co-founded (with Albert Muniz Jr.) the term “Brand Community” a community of brand admirers who are very important to success or failure if the brand, and extended the idea of community to the domain of branded goods. Brand Community (2001) is one of the most cited articles in marketing and economics, and has helped to explain an important social function of consumer societies. The paper (published 2001) was given the Journal of Consumer Research Long-Term Contribution Award In 2014. He has also won awards from the same organization on his work to understanding the imagined world of other consumers. The compulsive buying scale is used in many clinical settings throughout the world. His later work has been in the area of the merger of politics and branding. He is a common keynote speaker on the topic.

His work has been featured in The Wall St. Journal, National Public Radio, and The New York Times.

== Education ==
Thomas O'Guinn received his B.S. and M.S. in communications, from the University of Texas at Austin in 1976, 1978. He later received his Ph.D. in communication at the University of Texas at Austin in 1982.

== Career ==
In 1982 O'Guinn took up an assistant professor position in the Department of Advertising at the University of Illinois at Urbana-Champaign. In 1987, O'Guinn remained an Associate Professor as the Department of Advertising merged with the Department of Business Administration. In 1995 O'Guinn was made a professor in the Department of Sociology at the UIUC. In 2006 O'Guinn moved to take up a Professor and executive director role in the Department of Marketing at the Center for Brand and Product Management at the University of Wisconsin-Madison, and was made a Research Fellow in 2010. In 2016, O'Guinn was made Chair of the Marketing Department at the Wisconsin School of Business.

== Representative publications ==
- O’Guinn, Thomas C. and Ronald J. Faber, “Compulsive Buying: A Phenomenological Exploration,” Journal of Consumer Research, 16:2 (Sept.), (Finalist Best of JCR). 147–157, 1989
- Faber, Ronald J. and Thomas C. O'Guinn, “A Clinical Screener for Compulsive Buying,” Journal of Consumer Research, 19:3 (Dec.), 459–469, 1992
- O’Guinn, Thomas C. and L.J. Shrum, “The Role of Television in the Construction of Consumer Reality,” Journal of Consumer Research, March, 1997, 278–294, (co-winner, Best of JCR, 1997)
- Muñiz, Albert M. Jr. and Thomas C. O’Guinn, “Brand Community,” Journal of Consumer Research, 27:4 (March), 2001, 412–431. (Awarded Best of JCR 2001)
- Pracejus, John W., G. Douglas Olsen and Thomas C. O’Guinn (2006), “How Nothing Became Something: White Space, Rhetoric, History and Meaning,” Journal of Consumer Research, (33;1) June, 82–90.
- Pracejus, John W., Thomas C. O’Guinn and Doug Olson (2013), “When White Space Is More than Burning Money: Economic Signaling Meets Visual Commercial Rhetoric,” International Journal of Research in Marketing, (30), 211–218.
- O’Guinn, Thomas Clayton, Robin J. Tanner and Ahreum Maeng (2015), “Turning to Space: Social Density, Social Class and the Value of Things in Stores,” Journal of Consumer Research, 42;2 (August), 196–213.
