= Jérôme Lohez 9/11 Scholarship Foundation =

The Jérôme R. Lohez 9/11 Scholarship Foundation was launched in November 2005, in memory of Jérôme R. Lohez, a Frenchman who was lost in the North Tower of the World Trade Center during the September 11 attacks on New York City. The foundation is, according to its mission statement, "the only charitable organization established after the 9/11 tragedy that is dedicated specifically to promoting educational and cultural exchange among the U.S., France and China."

== Scholarship foundation ==
The founder of the organization is Jérôme Lohez's widow, Dening Wu Lohez. Ms. Lohez first established a memorial scholarship fund in her husband's memory in 2002 at Stevens Institute of Technology in Hoboken, N.J. Ms. Lohez and her husband had met as graduate students at the Institute during the mid-1990s. The scholarship foundation was a later outgrowth of this early effort.

Lohez sought and received assistance from French diplomatic representatives in establishing the foundation. In 2008, President Nicolas Sarkozy wrote a letter of commendation in recognition of the foundation's achievements.

To date, the Jérôme R. Lohez 9/11 Scholarship Foundation and the Stevens Jérôme R. Lohez '95 Memorial Fund have provided scholarship monies to more than 30 French, American and Chinese graduate exchange students, working through Stevens in the U.S. and EPITA in France, as well as in partnership with the Columbia University Alliance Program in New York City.

In 2012, the foundation initiated the Jacques Barzun Award for Distinguished Contributions to Trans-Cultural Scholarly Exchange. According to the foundation, the award is "to be conferred once a year upon two institutions of higher learning, one French and one American, in recognition of their shared international dual-degree programs (master’s and doctoral levels), and/or for their joint research efforts." The foundation also initiated a new set of partnerships with Fudan University in Shanghai, China. The first agreement was concluded with Fudan University's School of Journalism to provide scholarship awards to French and Chinese students from the Fudan-Sciences Po dual master's degree program on Media and Communications.

In 2013, the foundation established a second agreement, with Fudan University's School of International Relations and Public Administration, to provide scholarship awards to French and Chinese students from the Fudan-Sciences Po dual master's degree program on Asia and European Global Affairs. Two successive Scholarship Award ceremonies were held at the French Consul's residence in Shanghai.

On May 1, 2013, one of France's highest civilian service awards, the Insignia of Knight, Chevalier of the National Order of Merit, was bestowed upon Ms. Lohez, for her "tireless support of international education and French-American relations", during a ceremony held at the French Consulate in New York City. French Consul General Bertrand Lortholary presided at the ceremony.
