= Community of style =

Community formed on basis of attachment to combination of product or marque

A community of style is a community formed on the basis of attachment to a combination of product or marque. In contrast to brand community, where communal social interaction is formed between members because of a shared interest in one particular brand, the concept of community of style illustrates how community emerge when the combining of brands instead is what creates and support communal social action among particular consumer groups.

== See also ==
- Brand community
