= Decadence (TV series) =

Australian television documentary series

- Opening title screen
- Also known as: Decadence: The Meaninglessness of Modern Life
- Genre: Documentary
- Presented by: Pria Viswalingam
- Country of origin: Australia
- Original language: English
- No. of seasons: 1
- No. of episodes: 6

Production
- Producer: Pria Viswalingam
- Production location: Australia
- Running time: 26 minutes

Original release
- Network: SBS
- Release: 6 December 2006 – 10 January 2007

Decadence: The Meaninglessness of Modern Life is a six-part television documentary series commissioned by SBS Independent and produced by Fork Films. The series is hosted by Pria Viswalingam, who is best known for his work on the travel show A Fork in the Road. Decadence was originally broadcast on the Special Broadcasting Service (SBS) of Australia in 2006 in the form of six, thirty-minute-long episodes (including advertisements). It was re-screened again in 2007 as part of the SBS season on globalisation.

The series examined the decadence and meaninglessness of modern, western life. It is also posed the question: 'If we live in such a great and prosperous world, and we are living longer, better, and healthier than before, why are we so unhappy?' There were interviews with prominent experts and leaders in their fields throughout the series including John Tirman, Cardinal George Pell, Avner Offer, Susan Greenfield, Phillip Knightley, Kishore Mahbubani, Noam Chomsky, and John Spong.

== Episode guide ==
=== Episode One: Money ===
Part one examined the growing greed of society and the 1980s ideal that greed is good. It also looked at the growing disparity between rich and poor.

==== Featured interviews ====
- Petrea King, the founder of the Quest for Life Centre
- Richard Eckersley, a social analyst at the Australian National University
- The Honourable Jeff Kennett AC, the founding Chairman of beyondblue
- Dr Clive Hamilton AM FRSA, a public intellectual and founder and former executive director of the Australia Institute
- Ian Kiernan AO, the founder of the Clean Up the World movement

=== Episode Two: Sex ===
Viswalingam interviewed New South Wales Police Commissioner Ken Moroney about the extent to which many cases of rape have become particularly violent and gruesome, and asked why sex crimes are growing in number. The link between violent pornography and sex crimes was also examined in this episode. A medical ethicist Dr. Amin Abboud noted that sex had been trivialized and needed to be placed back into the context of emotional connections and intimacy, and that sex should be rediscovered as part of love. In an interview, Orthodox Rabbi Shmuley Boteach, author of Kosher Sex, stated that modern relationships collapse when people lose interest in the sex, and that sex has become the sole measure and importance in a relationship.

=== Episode Three: Democracy ===
The nature of modern democracy was examined in this episode and the question was asked, 'Do we really live in a democratic world any more?' The erosion of democracy, media control and the use of public money for advertising was reviewed.

==== Featured interviews ====
- Robert Manne, a leading Australian public intellectual and former editor of Quadrant
- Major-General Michael Jeffery AC CVO MC, a former Governor General of Australia
- Professor Marian Sawer

=== Episode Four: Education ===
The continuing undervaluing of education in western society was considered. The lack of government funding for primary and secondary education was reviewed. There was discussion about the transformation of universities from great learning places into businesses competing for students' money, who only want a fast-tracked easy course into a high-paying career.

==== Featured interviews ====
- John Marsden, an author and educator
- Professor Paul Davies AM, an English physicist, writer and broadcaster

=== Episode Five: Family ===
The modern western family was discussed, as is what really is a family in the west. The gradual decline in the importance placed on families and the disintegration of the idea of a family and people preferring isolation was reviewed.

==== Featured interviews ====
- Alastair Nicholson AO RFD QC, a former Chief Justice of the Family Court
- Richard Eckersley
- Dan Phillips, an executive of the Macquarie Group
- Rabbi Shmuley Boteach, author of Kosher Sex

=== Episode Six: God ===
The nature of religion and religion in western society was reviewed. The growing number of irreligious people in Western countries was considered and it was asked whether this had any effect on our happiness or morals.

==== Featured interviews ====
- The Most Reverend Peter Jensen, a former Anglican Archbishop of Sydney
- His Eminence George Cardinal Pell AC, a former Catholic Archbishop of Sydney
- Dr Simon Longstaff, the founder of the St James Ethics Centre
- Pastor Brian Houston, a leader of the Hillsong Church
- Dr Muriel Porter OAM, an author and journalist

== See also ==
- Consumerism
- Anti-consumerism
- List of Australian television series
