= The Contemplation of the World =

1993 book by Michel Maffesoli

The Contemplation of the World: Figures of Community Style
- Author: Michel Maffesoli
- Original title: La Contemplation du monde. Figures du style communautaire
- Translator: Susan Emanuel
- Language: French
- Publisher: Éditions Grasset
- Publication date: 1 October 1993
- Publication place: France
- English publication date: 1997
- Pages: 238
- ISBN: 978-2-246-48391-5

The Contemplation of the World: Figures of Community Style (French: La Contemplation du monde. Figures du style communautaire) is a book by the French sociologist Michel Maffesoli, published in 1993 through éditions Grasset.

== Summary ==
Michel Maffesoli attempts to outline what links and regulates contemporary societies. His analysis is based on the idea of postmodernity, a current condition characterised by fragmentation of images, signs, objects and society. Maffesoli describes the kind of community that exists through the aesthetics and representation prevalent in such a society. He argues that "style" provides a link through everything from everyday life to shared emotions and political-economical organisation.

== Reception ==
Le Monde wrote that The Contemplation of the World is characterised by an absence of judging, and that Maffesoli goes against the grain by rejecting the idea that contemporary people are increasingly individualistic in their social interactions and that the increased importance of images fracture social life due to the media that control them. Alicia Lindón V. wrote in Estudios Sociológicos that The Contemplation of the World shares the "spiral-like thinking" of Maffesoli's previous books and succeeds to provoke readers with fluid thoughts, while mocking conventional, "rigid" sociology for what Maffesoli views as inabilities to understand a changing world.

The University of Minnesota Press published an English translation by Susan Emanuel in 1997.
