= From Dawn to Decadence =

Book by Jacques Barzun

From Dawn to Decadence: 500 Years of Western Cultural Life
- Author: Jacques Barzun
- Language: English
- Subject: History, Western civilization
- Genre: Non-fiction
- Publisher: HarperCollins
- Publication date: 2000
- Publication place: United States
- Media type: Print (hardcover)
- Pages: 802
- ISBN: 0-06-017586-9

From Dawn to Decadence: 500 Years of Western Cultural Life is a book written by Jacques Barzun. Published in 2000, it is a large-scale survey history of trends in history, politics, culture, and ideas in Western civilization, and argues that, from approximately the beginning of the 16th century to the end of the 20th century, the arc of Western culture comprises the beginning and ending of a distinct historical era.

== Description ==
Barzun published the book when he was 93 years old, and described the book in its prefatory note as the culmination of "a lifetime" of study of Western thought. He organizes the era of study - roughly 1500 to the then-present day of 2000 - into four large-scale periods. The first, spanning approximately 1500 to 1660, revolves principally around questions of religious belief; the second, roughly 1661 to 1789, around questions of how to arrange governance vis-a-vis the individual; the third, spanning approximately 1790 to 1920, around social and economic equality; and the fourth continuing to spin out the effects and influence of the decisions made in those previous eras. He refers to the last era as a period of "decadence", which he describes as follows.

All that is meant by Decadence is "falling off." It implies in those who live in such a time no loss of energy or talent or moral sense. On the contrary, it is a very active time, full of deep concerns, but peculiarly restless, for it sees no clear lines of advance. The loss it faces is that of Possibility. The forms of art as of life seem exhausted, the stages of development have been run through. Institutions function painfully. Repetition and frustration are the intolerable result. Boredom and fatigue are great historical forces.

The book is divided into four sections corresponding to the four periods mentioned above, which are then subdivided into chapters, some of which are organized around specific ideas, and others around what he calls "cross-sections" of cities or regions at particular historical moments. Barzun addresses trends in religious and philosophical thought, ideas about governance, politics, and political economy, literature, visual art, music, stage works, science and technology, manners and fashion, and other aspects of Western culture, interlinking them into a broad history of ideas. He highlights several recurrent themes throughout Western thought, including Abstraction, Analysis, Emancipation, Individualism, Primitivism, Scientism, Secularism, and Self-Consciousness. He argues that "the peoples of the West offered the world a set of ideas and institutions not found earlier or elsewhere", and that "it has pursued characteristic purposes - that is its unity - and now these purposes, carried out to their utmost possibility, are bringing about its demise."

The front cover image is a detail from The Romans in their Decadence, an 1848 painting by Thomas Couture.

== Reception ==
From Dawn to Decadence received considerable notice in the literary and popular press upon its release. Newsweek, in its review, described Barzun as "the last of the great polymath scholars" and praised the book as "the damnedest story you'll ever read", while noting with disapproval Barzun's "mandarin snippiness" about modern-day cultural life and a "few trifling errors". The Guardian said the work was "a history of ideas, not a historical narrative; it is an interpretation, not a description of what happened". The review praised Barzun for writing in "a light, lucid, epigrammatic style", but described his judgments of historical figures as "at best otiose and...[at times] ludicrously banal." In the New York Times, William Everdell said the book was "encyclopedic without being discontinuous" and "peerless - on every century but [the twentieth]", chiding Barzun for minor errors and for "writ[ing] the history of liberalism as if democracy had not improved it." First Things remarked, "We get assessments, sometimes quite idiosyncratic ones, of almost all the great names of the modern era, but many of the biographies are of persons the author deems worthy-but-obscure." Roger Kimball reviewed the book for The New Criterion, adjudging the book "a magnificent summa of his concerns as a thinker and historian."
