= Brand community =

Community formed on the basis of attachment to a brand or marque

A brand community is a concept in marketing and consumer research which postulates that human beings form communities on the basis of attachment to a brand or marque. A brand community refers to structured social relationships in which participants share admiration and connection of a brand that they experience through shared rituals, traditions and a sense of responsibility towards other members. The term often refers to the intersection between brand, individual identity and culture.

== Origin ==
The term "brand community" was first presented by Albert Muniz Jr. and Thomas C. O'Guinn in a 1995 paper for the Association for Consumer Research Annual Conference in Minneapolis, MN. In a 2001 article titled " Brand Community", they defined the concept as "a specialized, non-geographically bound community, based on a structured set of social relations among admirers of a brand." This 2001 paper recently has been acknowledged by Thomson Scientific & Healthcare to be one of the most cited papers in the field of economics and business.

== Description ==
Brand community members develop connections with like-minded individuals by sharing appreciation, lifestyle and meanings associated with a particular brand. Brands can be seen as relationship builders that consumers use to relate with each other and with brands in order to seek the consensus of affective link and emotional support. Among the concepts developed to explain the behavior of consumers, the concept of a brand community focuses on the interconnections and relationships between consumers. Under this view, consumers and firms co-create value.

A brand community can be defined as an enduring self-selected group of actors sharing a system of values, standards and representations (a culture) and recognizing bonds of membership with each other and with the whole. Many brands provide examples of brand communities. In computers and electronics: Apple Inc. (Macintosh, iPod, iPhone), Holga and LOMO cameras, and Palm and Pocket PC Ultra-Mobile PCs. In vehicles: Ford Bronco, Jeep, Miata, Mini Cooper, Saab, Saturn and Subaru automobiles, and Royal Enfield and Harley-Davidson motorcycles. In toys: Barbie and Lego.

=== Corporate motivations ===
There are certainly many advantages to brand communities, some of which add to company image, whereas others simply boost sales and revenue across the board. Well known advantages of having followers include perks such as: a loyal customer-base, low price sensitivity, improved competitiveness, and snowball advertising. A loyal customer base means that through 'thick and thin', the consumer will stay by your side. A good example of this is when Nike, although being found out for exploiting cheap child labour in the Nike owned sweatshops, maintains a fanatical following from their loyal customer base. Another advantage previously mentioned is low price sensitivity. This means that consumers aren't as conscious as to the price they are paying for their worshipped brand's goods. The consumers are able to pay more in a guilt-free manner without the need to shop for a cheaper and/or better alternative, i.e. an elastic demand. The third mentioned advantage was that of the 'improved competitiveness' category. This means that as a result of a fanatical, loyal following, consumers see no real competition or substitute for their chosen brand/s. Linking back to low price sensitivity, consumers are willing to pay any price for the product and as a result, the companies do not partake in any sort of price war with competitors. The fourth and final mentioned advantage is 'snowball advertising'. Here snowball advertising means that loyal customers spread word of praise for their chosen brand/s. Linking back to a "cultist recruitment stage" companies are able to let consumers broaden their demographic as people who hear positive word about a product are likely to go through at least one of the three cultist brand stages.

== Variants ==
There are several concepts that are directly related to brand communities

- Consumer tribes or brand tribes refer to ephemeral and impermanent groups that lack structured hierarchy and organized leadership. Building on the notion of neotribalism, consumer tribes as "a fluid group of people who share ephemeral experiences based on a particular product, service, brand or consumption activity", that enable communal experiences of consumption.
- Subcultures of consumption infer social orders or subcultures that endure through interpersonal connections, rituals, and sets of beliefs that can preclude other social affiliations, thus impacting on the identity of participants.
- Community of Style refers to a community formed on the basis of attachment to a combination of brands. In contrast to brand community, where communal social interaction is formed between members because of a shared interest in one particular brand, the concept of community of style illustrates how community emerge when the combining of brands.
