= Pria Viswalingam =

Australian documentary and film maker (born 1962)

- Born: Anandan Pria Viswalingam; 1962 (age 62–63); Kota Bahru, Federation of Malaya
- Occupation: Television presenter • film producer
- Years active: 1987–present
- Known for: A Fork in the Road

Anandan Pria Viswalingam (born 1962) is an Australian documentary and film maker. He is a Sydney-based producer, writer and director, known earlier for his work with the Special Broadcasting Service (SBS) network.

Viswalingam was born in Kota Bahru, Federation of Malaya in 1962. He was educated at a boarding school in England before emigrating to Perth, Western Australia. After graduating from the Western Australian Academy of Performing Arts in 1987, his broadcasting experience began in radio, as a newsreader and reporter, specialising in politics and international affairs.

In 1989, he moved to SBS Television and worked in news and current affairs, where he presented and reported live-to-air programming. As well as anchoring the network's World News, he hosted Dateline, Tonight, Asia Report and Wine Lover’s Guide to Australia. Viswalingam is best known for presenting the A Fork in the Road travelogues from 1992 until 2005, including A Fork in Australia, A Fork in Asia, A Fork in Africa and A Fork in the Mediterranean. The program was SBS's largest international success, with the series repeated on Foxtel's Lifestyle Channel, as well as shown on cable television in Europe, Asia and Canada.

In 2001, he wrote, produced, directed and narrated Class, a four-episode documentary series for SBS that looks at the "slow death of egalitarian Australia". Also in 2001, he wrote and directed the four episodes of A Yen for a Dollar, a series which looked at Asian culture through the prism of business. This series aired on the ABC in February 2002.

In 2006, Viswalingam wrote, produced and presented Decadence, with reflections on modern life in the West, in six episodes of 25 minutes each.

From 2007 to 2008, he co-wrote and co-directed The Last Trimate—a one-hour documentary on the life of Birutė Galdikas and her pioneering study of Borneo's orangutans, which was narrated by Mel Gibson.

In 2008, based on the success of the SBS TV series Decadence, Viswalingam began work on a documentary feature film version, which was released to Australian cinemas in December 2011 as Decadence: The Decline of the Western World.

Viswalingam has written and directed episodes on all series of Coast Australia and Coast New Zealand for the History Channel and the BBC. He is developing drama projects in Australia and the UK.
