= The Time of the Tribes =

1988 book by Michel Maffesoli

- Author: Michel Maffesoli
- Original title: Le Temps des tribus
- Translator: Don Smith
- Language: French
- Publisher: Méridiens-Klincksieck
- Publication date: 1988
- Publication place: France
- English publication date: 1996
- Media type: Print
- Pages: 226 (first edition)
- ISBN: 2-86563-190-7

The Time of the Tribes: The Decline of Individualism in Mass Society (French: Le Temps des tribus : le déclin de l'individualisme dans les sociétés de masse) is a 1988 book by the French sociologist Michel Maffesoli. It argues that mass society, rather than creating a mass of individuals, has resulted in a type of tribalised society. The book and its subject, labelled neo-tribes, have had impact in sociology and other fields.

== Summary ==
Maffesoli argues that mass society contains a paradox created by the tension between mass culture and the human propensity to form groups. Rather than producing homogenous individuals, mass society has led to the creation of many small groups: a form of tribes (French: tribus) which are defined by lifestyles and common taste. The humans of a mass society belong to multiple tribes which they move between and exist within as part of their everyday lives. Maffesoli discusses the dynamics of the tribalised mass society using the terms puissance and proxemics. Puissance ('power', 'might') stems from the emotions at the centre of a tribe, and Maffesoli uses it in contrast with pouvoir ('power', 'authority'), which is at the centre of politics. Because puissance and pouvoir operate in different ways, a tribalised society creates a crisis for certain aspects of political life. Proxemics concerns the sense of being near other humans; it is what brings a tribe together by creating a feeling of belonging and solidarity. Following Max Weber, Maffesoli associates the plurality of values in a tribalised society with polytheism and argues that what Weber called disenchantment is followed by re-enchantment.

== Publication ==
The Time of the Tribes was published in French in 1988 by Méridiens-Klincksieck as part of the book series Sociologies au quotidien. It was translated into English by Don Smith and published by Sage Publications in 1996.

== Reception ==
The ethnologist Jean-François Gossiaux wrote that the theses in The Time of the Tribes are unoriginal and what distinguishes the book are instead the value judgements apparent in the author's tone and in neologisms such as "bourgeoisisme", which groups together capitalism and Marxism. Gossiaux criticised the book for vagueness and for relying on metaphors, including the central metaphor of the tribe, without consulting sociography or ethnography. The sociologist Anne-Marie Laulan wrote that although The Time of the Tribes is a work of sociology and philosophy, its main contribution is that it brings hope for the future of social communication. Laulan highlighted how Maffesoli describes hypermodernity as a middle way between individualist reason and the instincts of the mass.

Several foreign sociologists described The Time of the Tribes as important but criticised Maffesoli for not addressing the potentially unpleasant sides of the tribus. Ronald N. Jacobs called it an ambitious book that raises relevant questions concerning society, religion and social movements and Abby Peterson described it as "one of the most important contributions to the discourse of cultural sociology to come on the scene". Jacobs wrote that "the darker side of neotribalism", which Maffesoli does not discuss, is the risk that aesthetics-based groups become too inward-looking and lose the ability to feel solidarity with other groups, which in the context of politics and power can cause problems. Peterson said Maffesoli neglects to address what she called the "murky" and "distasteful" side of his subject, which she exemplified with "ethnic nationalism and fascistic exploitation of the tribus". Jacobs wrote that readers may be annoyed by the book's stylistic devices, adopted from "French theory", and "the complete lack of attention to contemporary American sociology".

== Legacy ==
Maffesoli's tribus concept inspired a body of literature that extends beyond sociology, where it is used as an alternative to theories about individualisation or social fragmentation as the defining characteristics of a post-industrial society. In English-language literature, the concept is often referred to as neo-tribes, a term coined by Rob Shields in 1992 and intended as a translation of Maffesoli's French word. Various scholars have elaborated on neo-tribes and their stability or lack thereof, how they are connected to consumption and market forces, and how they relate to class identity. The Time of the Tribes is cited in many publications about "consumer tribes"; Daragh O'Reilly, a lecturer in marketing, has criticised this literature for not engaging with Maffessoli's ideas beyond summarising them or mentioning the existence of "ephemeral gatherings".
