= Wine Lover's Guide to Australia =

Australian television show

Wine Lover's Guide to Australia was an Australian wine television show presented by Pria Viswalingam, Grant van Every, and Maryann Egan. It was produced and broadcast by the Special Broadcasting Service.

The series guides viewers through Australia's diverse wine-producing regions, as well as four wine regions of New Zealand. It also discusses the history of wine making in Australia, the various grape varieties grown in Australia, and other topics such as wine etiquette, collecting, cellaring, and judging.

A total of 26 episodes were produced (two series, each comprising 13 episodes). The first series screened in 1998, and the second in 2001. Episodes averaged 26 minutes in length.
