= Jacques Barzun =

French-American historian (1907–2012)

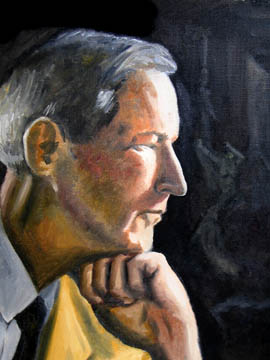
- Painting of Barzun titled With Light from a New Dawn, 1947
- Born: Jacques Martin Barzun; November 30, 1907; Créteil, France
- Died: October 25, 2012 (aged 104); San Antonio, Texas, U.S.
- Education: Columbia University (BA, MA, PhD)
- Occupation: Historian
- Relatives: Lucy Barzun Donnelly (granddaughter); Matthew Barzun (grandson)

Jacques Martin Barzun (/ˈbɑːrzən/; November 30, 1907 – October 25, 2012) was a French-born American historian known for his studies of the history of ideas and cultural history. He wrote about a wide range of subjects, including baseball, mystery novels, and classical music, and was also known as a philosopher of education. His 1945 book Teacher in America influenced the training of schoolteachers in the United States.

A professor of history at Columbia College for many years, he published more than forty books, was awarded the American Presidential Medal of Freedom, and was designated a knight of the French Legion of Honor. The historical retrospective From Dawn to Decadence: 500 Years of Western Cultural Life, 1500 to the Present (2000), widely considered his magnum opus, was published when he was 93 years old.

== Life ==
Jacques Martin Barzun was born in Créteil, France, to Henri-Martin Barzun and Anna-Rose Barzun, and spent his childhood in Paris and Grenoble. His father was a member of the Abbaye de Créteil group of artists and writers, and also worked in the French Ministry of Labor. His parents' Paris home was frequented by many modernist artists of Belle Époque France, such as the poet Guillaume Apollinaire, the Cubist painters Albert Gleizes and Marcel Duchamp, the composer Edgard Varèse, and the writers Richard Aldington and Stefan Zweig.

While on a diplomatic mission to the United States during the First World War (1914–1918), Barzun's father so liked the country he decided that his son should receive an American university education; thus, the twelve-year-old Jacques Martin, after attending the Lycée Janson-de-Sailly, was sent to America, where he graduated from Harrisburg Technical High School in 1923 and then went off to Columbia University, where he obtained a liberal arts education.

As an undergraduate at Columbia College, Barzun was drama critic for the Columbia Daily Spectator, a prize-winning president of the Philolexian Society, the Columbia literary and debate club, and valedictorian of the class of 1927. He obtained a master's degree in 1928 and a Ph.D. in 1932 from Columbia, and taught history there from 1928 to 1955, becoming the Seth Low Professor of History and a founder of the discipline of cultural history. For years, he and literary critic Lionel Trilling conducted Columbia's famous Great Books course. He was elected Fellow of the American Academy of Arts and Sciences in 1954 and a member of the American Philosophical Society in 1984.

From 1955 to 1968, he served as Dean of the Graduate School, Dean of Faculties, and Provost, while also being an Extraordinary Fellow of Churchill College at the University of Cambridge. From 1968 until his 1975 retirement, he was University Professor at Columbia. From 1951 to 1963 Barzun was one of the managing editors of The Readers' Subscription Book Club, and its successor the Mid-Century Book Society (the other managing editors being W. H. Auden and Lionel Trilling), and afterwards was Literary Adviser to Charles Scribner's Sons, 1975 to 1993.

In 1936, Barzun married Mariana Lowell, a violinist from a prominent Boston family. They had three children: James, Roger, and Isabel. Mariana died in 1979. In 1980, Barzun married Marguerite Lee Davenport. From 1996 the Barzuns lived in her hometown, San Antonio, Texas. His granddaughter Lucy Barzun Donnelly was a producer of the award-winning HBO film Grey Gardens. His grandson, Matthew Barzun, is a businessman who served from 2009 to 2011 as the U.S. Ambassador to Sweden, and from 2013 to 2017 as Ambassador to the United Kingdom. On May 14, 2012, Jacques Barzun attended a symphony performance in his honor at which works by his favorite composer, Hector Berlioz, were performed. He attended in a wheelchair and delivered a brief address to the crowd.

Barzun died at his home in San Antonio, Texas on October 25, 2012, aged 104. The New York Times, which compared him with such scholars as Sidney Hook, Daniel Bell, and Lionel Trilling, called him a "distinguished historian, essayist, cultural gadfly and educator who helped establish the modern discipline of cultural history". Naming Edward Gibbon, Jacob Burckhardt and Thomas Babington Macaulay as his intellectual ancestors, and calling him "one of the West's most eminent historians of culture" and "a champion of the liberal arts tradition in higher education," who "deplored what he called the 'gangrene of specialism'", The Daily Telegraph remarked, "The sheer scope of his knowledge was extraordinary. Barzun's eye roamed over the full spectrum of Western music, art, literature and philosophy." Essayist Joseph Epstein, remembering him in the Wall Street Journal as a "flawless and magisterial" writer who tackled "Darwin, Marx, Wagner, Berlioz, William James, French verse, English prose composition, university teaching, detective fiction, [and] the state of intellectual life", described Barzun as a tall, handsome man with an understated elegance, thoroughly Americanized, but retaining an air of old-world culture, cosmopolitan in an elegant way rare for intellectuals".

== Career ==
Over seven decades, Barzun wrote and edited more than forty books touching on an unusually broad range of subjects, including science and medicine, psychiatry from Robert Burton through William James to modern methods, and art, and classical music; he was one of the all-time authorities on Hector Berlioz. Some of his books—particularly Teacher in America and The House of Intellect—enjoyed a substantial lay readership and influenced debate about culture and education far beyond the realm of academic history. Barzun had a strong interest in the tools and mechanics of writing and research. He undertook the task of completing, from a manuscript almost two-thirds of which was in first draft at the author's death, and editing (with the help of six other people), the first edition (published 1966) of Follett's Modern American Usage. Barzun was also the author of books on literary style (Simple and Direct, 1975), on the crafts of editing and publishing (On Writing, Editing, and Publishing, 1971), and on research methods in history and the other humanities (The Modern Researcher, which has seen at least six editions, and is one of the thousand most widely held library items according to the OCLC).

Barzun did not disdain popular culture: his varied interests included detective fiction and baseball. His widely quoted statement, "Whoever wants to know the heart and mind of America had better learn baseball." was inscribed on a plaque at the Baseball Hall of Fame. He edited and wrote the introduction to the 1961 anthology, The Delights of Detection, which included stories by G. K. Chesterton, Dorothy L. Sayers, Rex Stout, and others. In 1971, Barzun co-authored (with Wendell Hertig Taylor), A Catalogue of Crime: Being a Reader's Guide to the Literature of Mystery, Detection, & Related Genres, for which he and his co-author received a Special Edgar Award from the Mystery Writers of America the following year. Barzun was also an advocate of supernatural fiction, and wrote the introduction to The Penguin Encyclopedia of Horror and the Supernatural. Barzun was a proponent of the theatre critic and diarist James Agate, whom he compared in stature to Samuel Pepys. Barzun edited Agate's last two diaries into a new edition in 1951 and wrote an informative introductory essay, "Agate and His Nine Egos".

From Dawn to Decadence by Jacques Barzun

Jacques Barzun continued to write on education and cultural history after retiring from Columbia. At 84 years of age, he began writing his swan song, to which he devoted the better part of the 1990s. The resulting book of more than 800 pages, From Dawn to Decadence: 500 Years of Western Cultural Life, 1500 to the Present, revealed a vast erudition and brilliance undimmed by advanced age. Historians, literary critics, and popular reviewers all lauded From Dawn to Decadence as a sweeping and powerful survey of modern Western history, and it became a New York Times bestseller. With this work he gained an international reputation. Reviewing it in the New York Times, historian William Everdell called the book "a great achievement" by a scholar "undiminished in his scholarship, research and polymathic interests," while also scrutinizing Barzun's scant treatment of figures like Walt Whitman and Karl Marx. The book introduces several novel typographic devices that aid an unusually rich system of cross-referencing and help keep many strands of thought in the book under organized control. Most pages feature a sidebar containing a pithy quotation, usually little known, and often surprising or humorous, from some author or historical figure. In 2007, Barzun commented that "Old age is like learning a new profession. And not one of your own choosing." As late as October 2011, one month before his 104th birthday, he reviewed Adam Kirsch's Why Trilling Matters for the Wall Street Journal.

In his philosophy of writing history, Barzun emphasized the role of storytelling over the use of academic jargon and detached analysis. He concluded in From Dawn to Decadence that "history cannot be a science; it is the very opposite, in that its interest resides in the particulars".

== Recognition ==
In 1968, Barzun received the St. Louis Literary Award from the Saint Louis University Library Associates. Barzun was appointed a Chevalier of the National Order of the Legion of Honour. In 2003, he was awarded the Presidential Medal of Freedom by President George W. Bush.

In 1993, his book "An Essay on French Verse: For Readers of English Poetry" won the Poetry Society of America's Melville Cane Poetry Award.

On October 18, 2007, he received the 59th Great Teacher Award of the Society of Columbia Graduates in absentia.

On March 2, 2011, Barzun was awarded the 2010 National Humanities Medal by President Barack Obama, although he was not expected to be in attendance. On April 16, 2011, he received the Philolexian Award for Distinguished Literary Achievement in absentia.

The American Philosophical Society honors Barzun with its Jacques Barzun Prize in Cultural History, awarded annually since 1993 to the author of a recent distinguished work of cultural history. He also received the gold medal for Criticism from the American Academy of Arts and Letters, of which he was twice president.

== Works ==
- 1927 Samplings and Chronicles: Being the Continuation of the Philolexian Society History, with Literary Selections from 1912 to 1927 (editor). Philolexian Society.
- 1932 The French Race: Theories of Its Origins and Their Social and Political Implications. P.S. King & Son.
- 1937 Race: A Study in Modern Superstition (Revised, 1965 Race: A Study in Superstition). Methuen & Co. Ltd.
- 1939 Of Human Freedom. Revised edition, Greenwood Press Reprint, 1977: ISBN 0-8371-9321-4.
- 1941 Darwin, Marx, Wagner: Critique of a Heritage. ISBN 978-1-4067-6178-8.
- 1943 Romanticism and the Modern Ego. Boston, Little, Brown and Company, 1943.
- 1945 Teacher in America. Reprint Liberty Fund, 1981. ISBN 0-913966-79-7. Also published as: We Who Teach. London: Victor Gollancz Ltd, 1946.
- 1950 Berlioz and the Romantic Century. Boston: Little, Brown and Company / An Atlantic Monthly Press Book, 1950 [2 vols.].
- 1951 Pleasures of Music: A Reader's Choice of Great Writing About Music and Musicians From Cellini to Bernard Shaw Viking Press.
- 1954 God's Country and Mine: A Declaration of Love, Spiced with a Few Harsh Words. Reprint Greenwood Press, 1973: ISBN 0-8371-6860-0.
- 1956 Music in American Life. Indiana University Press.
- 1956 The Energies of Art: Studies of Authors, Classic and Modern. Greenwood, ISBN 0-8371-6856-2.
- 1959 The House of Intellect. Reprint Harper Perennial, 2002: ISBN 978-0-06-010230-2.
- 1960 Lincoln: The Literary Genius (first published in The Saturday Evening Post, February 14, 1959)
- 1961 The Delights of Detection. Criterion Books.
- 1961 Classic, Romantic, and Modern. Reprint University of Chicago Press, 1975: ISBN 0-226-03852-1.
- 1964 Science: The Glorious Entertainment. HarperCollins. ISBN 0-06-010240-3.
- 1967 What Man Has Built (introductory booklet to the Great Ages of Man book series). Time Inc.
- 1968 The American University: How It Runs, Where It Is Going. Reprint University of Chicago Press, 1993: ISBN 0-226-03845-9.
- 1969 Berlioz and the Romantic Century (3d ed.).
- 1971 On Writing, Editing, and Publishing. University of Chicago Press.
- 1971 A Catalogue of Crime: Being a Reader's Guide to the Literature of Mystery, Detection, and Related Genres (with Wendell Hertig Taylor). Revised edition, Harper & Row, 1989: ISBN 0-06-015796-8.
- 1974 Clio and the Doctors. Reprinted University of Chicago Press, 1993: ISBN 0-226-03851-3.
- 1974 The Use and Abuse of Art (A. W. Mellon Lectures in the Fine Arts) . Princeton University Press. ISBN 0-691-01804-9.
- 1975 Simple and Direct: A Rhetoric for Writers. 4th ed, Harper Perennial, 2001: ISBN 0-06-093723-8.
- 1976 The Bibliophile of the Future: His Complaints about the Twentieth Century (Maury A. Bromsen lecture in humanistic bibliography). Boston Public Library. ISBN 0-89073-048-2.
- 1980 Three Talks at Northern Kentucky University. Northern Kentucky University, Dept. of Literature and Language.
- 1982 Lincoln's Philosophic Vision. Artichokes Creative Studios.
- 1982 Critical Questions: On Music and Letters, Culture and Biography, 1940–1980 (edited by Bea Friedland). University of Chicago Press. ISBN 0-226-03864-5.
- 1982 Berlioz and His Century: An Introduction to the Age of Romanticism (Abridgment of Berlioz and the Romantic Century). University of Chicago Press. ISBN 0-226-03861-0.
- 1983 A Stroll with William James. Reprint University of Chicago Press, 2002: ISBN 978-0-226-03869-8.
- 1986 A Word or Two Before You Go: Brief Essays on Language. Wesleyan University.
- 1989 The Culture We Deserve: A Critique of Disenlightenment. Wesleyan University. ISBN 0-8195-6237-8.
- 1991 An Essay on French Verse: For Readers of English Poetry. New Directions Publishing. ISBN 0-8112-1158-4.
- 1991 Begin Here: The Forgotten Conditions of Teaching and Learning. University of Chicago Press. ISBN 0-226-03846-7.
- 2000 From Dawn to Decadence: 500 Years of Western Cultural Life, 1500 to the Present. ISBN 978-0-06-092883-4.
- 2001 Sidelights on Opera at Glimmerglass. Glimmerglass Opera
- 2002 A Jacques Barzun Reader. ISBN 978-0-06-093542-9.
- 2002 What Is a School? and Trim the College! (What Is a School? An Institution in Limbo, Trim the College! A Utopia). Hudson Institute.
- 2003 The Modern Researcher (6th ed.) (with Henry F. Graff). Wadsworth Publishing. ISBN 978-0-495-31870-5.
- 2004 Four More Sidelights on Opera at Glimmerglass: 2001–2004

== See also ==
- American philosophy
- Jérôme Lohez 9/11 Scholarship Foundation and their Jacques Barzun Award
- List of American philosophers

== Sources ==
- Art at Our Doorstep: San Antonio Writers and Artists featuring Jacques Barzun. Edited by Nan Cuba and Riley Robinson (Trinity University Press, 2008).
- Arthur Krystal, Except When I Write Oxford University Press, 2011), has a chapter on Barzun. ISBN 978-0-19-978240-6
- Michael Murray, Jacques Barzun: Portrait of a Mind (Frederic C. Beil, 2011), authorized biography. ISBN 978-1-929490-41-7
- Thomas Vinciguerra, "Jacques Barzun '27: Columbia Avatar", Columbia College Today, January 2006
- Helen Hazen, "Endless Rewriting", The American Scholar, Spring 2013. On being edited by Barzun.
