= Marketing Theory =

- Discipline: Marketing
- Language: English
- Edited by: Andreas Chatzidakis, Finola Kerrigan, Rohit Varman

Publication details
- History: 2001-present
- Publisher: SAGE Publications
- Frequency: Quarterly
- Impact factor: 3.476 (2021)

Standard abbreviations
- ISO 4: Mark. Theory

Indexing
- ISSN: 1470-5931 (print); 1741-301X (web)
- LCCN: 2002200525
- OCLC no.: 48089850

Links
- Journal homepage; Online access; Online archive

Marketing Theory is a quarterly peer-reviewed academic journal covering the field of marketing. The editors-in-chief are Andreas Chatzidakis (Royal Holloway University of London), Finola Kerrigan (Birmingham Business School) and Rohit Varman (Birmingham Business School). It was established in 2001 and is published by SAGE Publications.

== Abstracting and indexing ==
The journal is abstracted and indexed in Scopus and the Social Sciences Citation Index.
