= Neotribalism =

Concept and movement

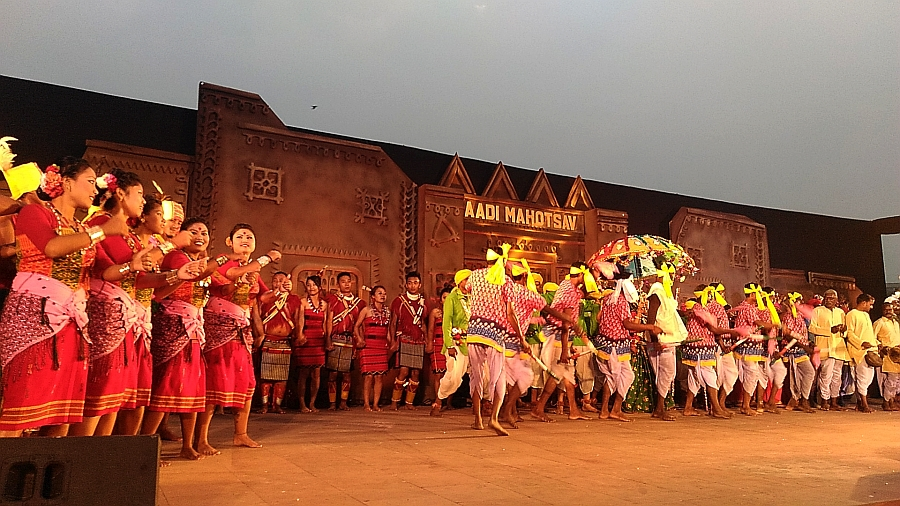
The Aadi Mahotsav – A Celebration of the Spirit of Tribal Culture, Crafts, Cuisine and Commerce

Neotribalism, also known as modern tribalism or new tribalism, is a sociological concept which postulates that human beings have evolved to live in tribal society, as opposed to mass society, and thus will naturally form social networks constituting new tribes.

== Sociological theory ==
French sociologist Michel Maffesoli was perhaps the first to use the term neotribalism in a scholarly context in his 1988 book The Time of the Tribes. Maffesoli predicted that as the culture and institutions of modernism declined, societies would embrace nostalgia and look to the organizational principles of the distant past for guidance, and that therefore the post-modern era would be the era of neotribalism.

Work by researchers such as American political scientist Robert D. Putnam and a 2006 study by McPherson, Smith-Lovin and Brasiers published in the American Sociological Review seem to support at least the more moderate neotribalist arguments.

The notion of neotribalism is used in the field of consumer research under the label consumer tribes.

== See also ==
- Anarcho-primitivism
- Communalism
- Evolutionary mismatch in human evolution
- Evolutionary psychology
- National-anarchism
