= A Fork in the Road (TV series) =

Australian travel television series

A Fork in the Road is an Australian travel television series airing on SBS and hosted by Pria Viswalingam. Described by SBS as "the thinking-person's travel show" the program takes the viewer off the beaten track and takes a look at the lives of the people living in each destination rather than following the usual "travel show" format.

For the first five series of A Fork in the Road, the show explored the world. The sixth series was called A Fork in Australia and explored locations closer to home. The altogether 62 episodes had a length of ca. 25 minutes each.

== Episodes in each series ==
=== Series 1 ===
1992: Egypt, Tuscany, Scotland, Hong Kong, Rhône-Alpes (France) and New York.

=== Series 2 ===
1993: Greece, Argentina, Indonesia, Zimbabwe, the Rhine Valley (Alsace, Germany & Switzerland) and San Francisco.

=== Series 3 ===
1994: Chicago, Paris, Sicily, Kerala (India), Malta and New Zealand.

=== Series 4 ===
1995: New Orleans, Hungary (2 episodes), Marseille, Rio de Janeiro and Malaysia.

=== Series 5 ===
Washington, D.C., Japan, Spain, Jamaica, Ireland (2 episodes).

=== Series 6 (A Fork in Australia) ===
1999: Colours, Wheat, Clever Country, Friends & Lovers, Tourism, Food, The Cringe, The Pilgrimage.

=== Series 7 (A Fork in Asia) ===
Tokyo/Hokkaido, Delhi, Beijing, Nepal, Lebanon, Singapore, Guilin and Thailand.

=== Series 8 (A Fork in Africa) ===
Tunisia, Kenya, Cape Town, Ethiopia, Madagascar, Zanzibar, Mali and Black Paris

=== Series 9 (A Fork in the Mediterranean) ===
2006: Venice, Barcelona, Saint-Tropez, Morocco, Kythera Island, Israel, Gibraltar, and Turkey.
