= Michel Maffesoli =

French sociologist (1944-)

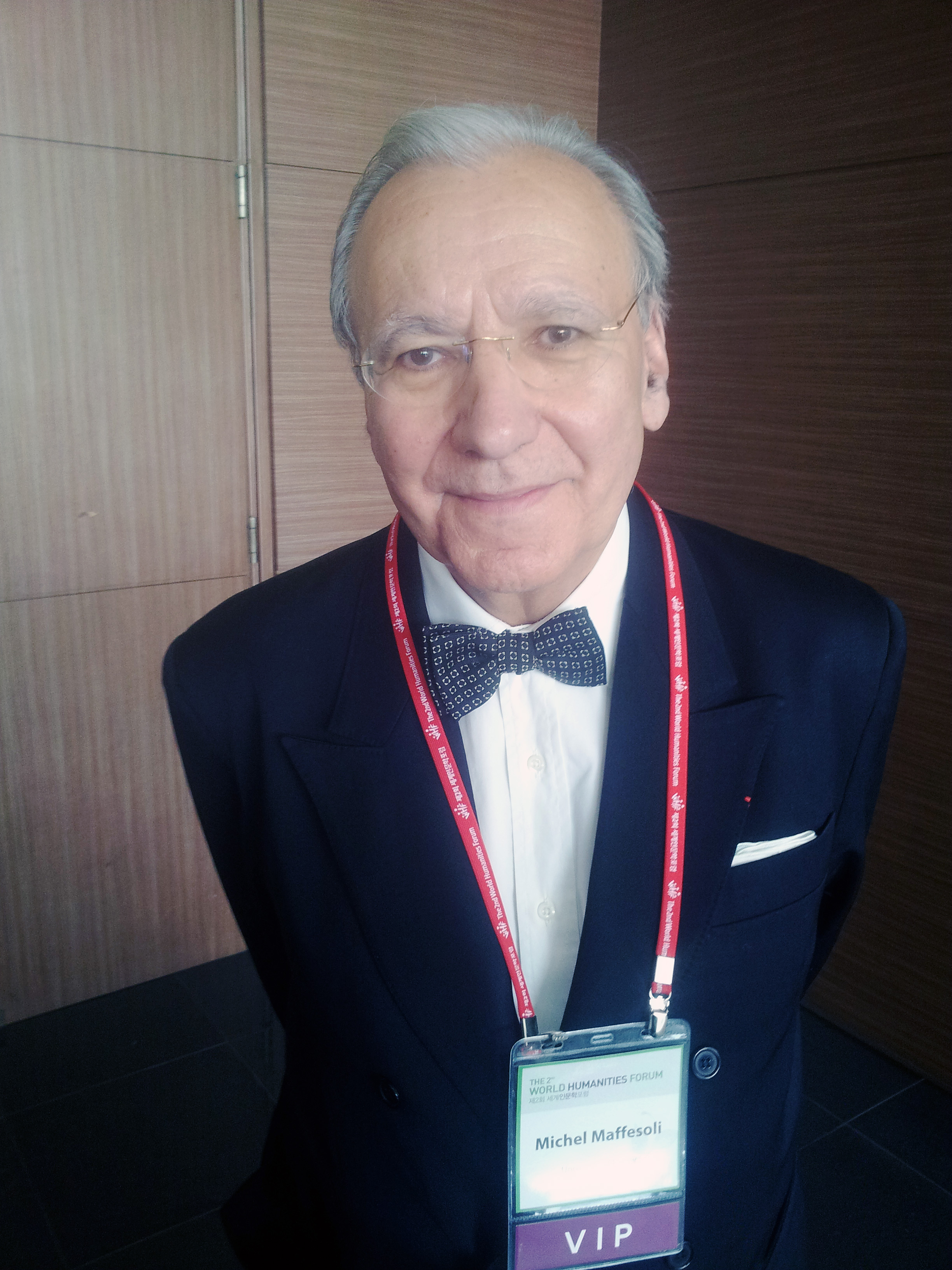
- Michel Maffesoli in 2012
- Born: 14 November 1944 (age 81); Graissessac, Hérault, France
- Education: University of Strasbourg; University of Grenoble (PhD)
- Occupation: Sociologist
- Spouse: Hélène Strohl (m. 1969)
- Children: 1

Michel Maffesoli (born 14 November 1944) is a French sociologist.

He is a former pupil of Gilbert Durand and Julien Freund, and an emeritus professor at Paris Descartes University. His work touches upon the issue of community links and the prevalence of "the imaginary" in the everyday life of contemporary societies, through which he contributes to the postmodern paradigm.

Maffesoli has been a member of the Institut Universitaire de France since September 2008, following a controversial nomination.

More generally, he has been the subject of several controversies, both scientific and professional, the most widely known of which concerns his supervision of the PhD dissertation of astrologer Élizabeth Teissier.

Maffesoli was born in Graissessac, Hérault.

== Professional activities ==
In 1972, Maffesoli was co-director of the ESU urban sociology research team in Grenoble. He developed a reflection on space which he continued in his work on nomadism (Du Nomadisme, Vagabondages initiatiques, La Table ronde, 1997). His work was influenced by Pierre Sansot and Jean Duvignaud, who were members of his PhD board in 1978. Maffesoli gave space a founding importance in social linkage and in the expression of subjectivity.

In 1978, Maffesoli became the teaching assistant of Julien Freund, a conservative political theorist and follower of Vilfredo Pareto, while he was lecturing in Strasbourg. Freund offered him to host the Institute of Polemology, which shows in his later works, under the themes of the "founding conflict" (La violence fondatrice, 1978), the "conflictual society" (PhD dissertation, 1981), and the use of the myth of Dionysus as "regenerating disorder" (L’Ombre de Dionysos, 1982).

In 1982, he founded the Centre d'études sur l'actuel et le quotidien (CEAQ) with Georges Balandier. The CEAQ is a humanities and social science research laboratory at Paris Descartes University, where he led a doctoral seminar until his retirement in 2012.

Maffesoli was awarded the Grand Prix des Sciences de l'Académie Française in 1992 for La transfiguration du politique.

Maffesoli is the director of the Cahiers Européens de l'imaginaire and Sociétés journals, as well as a member of the editorial board of Space and Culture and Sociologia Internationalis.

Maffesoli supported Nicolas Sarkozy in the French presidential election of 2012, which he later denied.

Maffesoli is sometimes associated with freemasonry, although there is no way to prove that he ever was a member of it.

He has recently appeared on French networks predicting an "age of insurrections."

== Reception within the scientific community ==
Within the scientific community of French sociologists, the scientific nature of Maffesoli's works is often questioned, especially since the furore concerning the thesis of Elizabeth Teissier "created great controversy within the community [of French sociologists and beyond], and has led many sociologists to intervene in order to challenge its legitimacy". On this issue, Maffesoli presented arguments on his methods, in particular through a new edition of his epistemological book, La connaissance ordinaire, in 2007. An opposition currently exists between Maffesoli's positions on "sensitive thinking" and supporters of a sociology embedded in the criteria of systematic and transparent scientificity. The conference "Raisons et Sociétés", held at the Sorbonne in 2002 following the Teissier controversy to debate the broader issue of methodologies in human sciences, identified differences between the various sociological traditions relating to this case.

Other controversies have led to challenges to Maffesoli's institutional position: the scientific community protested against his appointment to the board of the CNRS and against his appointment at the Institut Universitaire de France. On the other hand, Maffesoli's theories have been the subject of counter-inquiries, such as a survey by Laurent Tessier on free parties in France and England.

Maffesoli's work has achieved acclaim from authors including Serge Moscovici, Edgar Morin, Patrick Tacussel, Philippe-Joseph Salazar or Patrick Watier who regularly cite him. His influence can also be seen in various foreign journals. It is probably his book The Time of the Tribes (1988, 1991), translated into nine languages, which made his notoriety outside France (see urban tribes). Universities in Brazil, Korea and Italy request him for conferences. He has received a chair that was named after him in Brazil, and a honoris causa doctorate from the university of Bucharest.

His reception outside France is ambivalent. In a 1997 article in the Sociological Review, sociologist David Evans concluded that Maffesoli's theories were not a positive sociological paradigm, criticising his work as "incoherent" and "biased". The accounts of books written by foreign sociologists were less forthright, but sometimes stressed that Maffesoli's approach was subjective and had a lack of reflexivity. One sociologist even stated that Maffesoli's sociology was a "sociology of club".

== Controversies ==
=== Élizabeth Teissier controversy ===
Maffesoli came to the attention of the general public in April 2001 when he defended the thesis of Élizabeth Teissier about the ambivalence of the social reception of astrology, highly contentious theory that he directed and whose jury was chaired by Serge Moscovici at the Paris Descartes University.

The attribution of a doctorate to Teissier "created great controversy in the [scientific] community, and led many sociologists to intervene to challenge the legitimacy". The thesis immediately aroused criticism in the field of French sociology, particularly that published by Le Monde by Christian Baudelot and Roger Establet on 17 April 2001, and the petition of 30 April 2001 for the President of the Paris V University, and signed by 300 social scientists. Many critical comments were published in the national daily press, along with less radical comments. Beyond sociology, four French Nobel Prize winners (Claude Cohen-Tannoudji, Jean-Marie Lehn, Jean Dausset and Pierre-Gilles de Gennes) also protested against the title of "doctor" awarded to Élizabeth Teissier in a protest letter addressed to the then Minister of Education, Jack Lang.

The scientific, philosophical and sociological aspects of Teissier's thesis were studied by a group of scientists from several disciplines, including members of the Collège de France. The thesis was analyzed in detail by a group of astrophysicists and astronomers (Jean-Claude Pecker, Jean Audouze, Denis Savoie), a group of sociologists (Bernard Lahire, Philippe Cibois and Dominique Desjeux), a philosopher (Jacques Bouveresse), and by specialists of pseudo-science (Henri Broch and Jean-Paul Krivine). From this analysis, it appeared that the thesis was not valid from any viewpoint (sociological, astrophysical, or epistemological).

In an email of 23 April 2001 addressed to many sociologists, Maffesoli acknowledged that the thesis included some "slippages". His email minimized the importance of these errors and denounced a fierceness against Élizabeth Teissier and him.

After this controversy, two symposia were held to discuss the thesis's content and validity :

- A discussion-meeting entitled "La thèse de sociologie, questions épistémologiques et usages après l'affaire Teissier" was held at the Sorbonne on 12 May 2001 by the Association des sociologues enseignants du supérieur (ASES). Maffesoli was present at this meeting and attended the accounts by Christian Baudelot and Lucien Karpik.
- A symposium entitled "Raisons et Sociétés" was organized at the Sorbonne on 18 December 2002 to discuss and propose a theoretical answer to criticism. Several intellectuals and scientists participated in the meeting to bring the debate on scientific issues raised by the controversy. Edgar Morin, physicist Jean-Marc Lévy-Leblond, Mary Douglas, Paolo Fabbri, Franco Ferrarotti among others were present at this meeting.

This controversy was sometimes caricatured as an opposition between positivism and phenomenology. However, criticism of Michel Maffesoli came from both research schools, though positivist critics received more publicity.

=== Appointment to the board of the CNRS ===
Maffesoli's appointment to the board of Directors of the Centre National de la Recherche Scientifique caused an outcry in the scientific community. The decree of 5 October 2005 by which the appointment was established stated that the appointment was justified "because of [his] scientific and technological competence". Following Maffesoli's appointment, a petition entitled "Un conseil d'administration du CNRS doublement inacceptable!" was launched protesting both the non-respect for parity and the appointment of Maffesoli, deemed disrespectful of "the need for scientific credibility of the board".

Between October 2005 to February 2007, the petition received over 3,000 signatures, including these of Christian Baudelot, Stéphane Beaud, François de Singly, Jean-Louis Fabiani, Bernard Lahire, Louis Pinto, Alain Trautmann, Loïc Wacquant and Florence Weber. Ironically, and as an effect of the petition having two goals, it remains unclear whether the petitioners signed against Maffesoli's appointment or against the non-respect for parity.

=== Appointment to the Conseil National des Universités ===
In late 2007, when Maffesoli was appointed to the Conseil National des Universités (CNU), section 19 (Sociology, Demography), the Association des Sociologues Enseignants du Supérieur (ASES) and the Association Française de Sociologie (AFS) protested against this decision, as did many other social scientists. In June 2002 and after the Teissier controversy, Maffesoli himself proposed to delete the CNU, which he deemed "unnecessary". However, he participated in the work of the section 19 of the CNU, including the controversial self-promotion of its own members in June 2009.

=== Appointment to the Institut Universitaire de France ===
Maffesoli was one of the persons appointed to the Institut Universitaire de France by a decree issued by the Ministère de l'Enseignement supérieur et de la Recherche, Valérie Pécresse, in August 2008. This decree was the subject of a controversy over the appointment of people not selected by juries from the institute, including Maffesoli. According to economist Élie Cohen, president of the jury, Maffesoli "would be never accepted by the jury even if there were more places".

=== Sociétés hoax ===
Manuel Quinon and Arnaud Saint-Martin, two sociologists who were students of Maffesoli in the early 2000s, took inspiration from the Sokal hoax to demonstrate the lack of intellectual rigour in Maffesoli's work, as well as the absence of any serious peer review in one of the two journals that he directs.

Under the name "Jean-Pierre Tremblay", who was given a fictitious background as a Quebec-based sociologist, Quinon and Saint-Martin submitted an intentionally inept and absurd article on the "Autolib'", a small rentable car in Paris, to the Sociétés journal. The article was deliberately incoherent and plastered with liberal quotes and references to Maffesoli and other postmodern thinkers, positing that in self-service cars in Paris, the signs of masculinity had been erased and corrected, in order to "give way to an oblong maternity - no longer the phallus and the seminal energy of the sports car, but the 'uterus welcoming shelter-to-Autolib'". The article was duly "reviewed" by two people, before being accepted and published in Sociétés without any substantial editing.

The authors of the hoax published an article explaining their aims and methods in March 2015. The hoax article was then quickly withdrawn from the publishing platform on which it appeared.

== Bibliography ==
- Logique de la domination, Paris, PUF. (1976)
- avec Pessin A. La violence fondatrice . Paris, Champ Urbain Ed. (1978).
- La Violence totalitaire, Paris. PUF. (1979) Reed. (1994) La Violence totalitaire. Essai d'anthropologie politique. Paris, Méridiens/Klincksieck.
- La Conquête du présent. Pour une sociologie de la vie quotidienne. Paris, PUF. (1979)
- La Dynamique sociale. La société conflictuelle . Thèse d'État, Lille, Service des publications des thèses.(1981)
- L'Ombre de Dionysos (1982), Le Livre de Poche, reed. 1991
- Essai sur la violence banale et fondatrice, (1984) Paris, Librairie Méridiens/Klincksieck.
- La Connaissance ordinaire. Précis de sociologie compréhensive. (1985), Paris, Librairie des Méridiens. Paris ed., Klincksieck, 2007.
- La société est plusieurs, in : Une anthropologie des turbulences. Maffesoli M. (under the direction of) (1985), Berg International Ed., 175–180.
- Le Temps des tribus. Paris, Méridiens-Klincksieck. (1988), Le Livre de Poche, 1991.
- Au creux des apparences. Pour une éthique de l'esthétique.(1990), Paris, Plon. Reed. (1993) Le Livre de Poche,
- La Transfiguration du politique (La Table Ronde, 1992), Le Livre de Poche, 1995.
- La Contemplation du monde (1993), Le Livre de Poche, 1996.
- Eloge de la raison sensible. Paris, Grasset.(1996)
- Du nomadisme. Vagabondages initiatiques. Paris, Le Livre de Poche, Biblio-Essais,(1997)
- La part du diable précis de subversion postmoderne, Flammarion (2002)
- L'instant éternel. Le retour du tragique dans les sociétés postmodernes. Paris, La Table Ronde, (2003)
- Le rythme de vie - Variation sur l'imaginaire post-moderne, Paris, Ed. Table Ronde, Collection Contretemps, 2004, 260 pages.
- Pouvoir des hauts lieux (14p.) dans Pierre Delorme (dir.) La ville autrement, Ste-Foy, Ed. Presse de l'Université du Québec, 2005, 300 pages.
- Le réenchantement du monde - Morales, éthiques, déontologies, Paris, Table Ronde ed., 2007.
- « C’est au nom de la morale qu’on massacre les peuples » in Spectacle du Monde, entretien avec Richard Kitaeff, février 2008, p. 46–49.
- Iconologies. Nos idol@tries postmodernes, Paris, Albin Michel, 2008.
- Après la modernité ? - La conquête du présent, La violence totalitaire, La logique de la domination, Paris, CNRS ed., coll. Compendium, 2008.
- La République des bons sentiments, Le Rocher ed., 2008.
- Apocalypse, CNRS Éditions, 2009.
- La matrimonium : De la nature des choses, CNRS Éditions, 2010.
- Le Trésor caché, lettre ouverte aux francs-maçons et à quelques autres, Editions Léo Scheer, 2015.
