= Mass society =

Sociological concept

Mass society is a concept that describes modern society as a monolithic force and yet a disaggregate collection of individuals. The term is often used pejoratively to refer to a society in which bureaucracy and impersonal institutions have replaced some notion of traditional society, leading to social alienation.

In a sense, all societies are mass societies, but the term typically refers to developed countries that possess a mass culture and large-scale social, political and economic institutions which structure daily life for the majority of people. In modern times the term has taken on more importance and broader scope with the advent of mass media and the internet.

== History ==
Descriptions of society as a "mass" took form in the 19th century, referring to the leveling tendencies in the period of the Industrial Revolution that undermined traditional and aristocratic values, and replaced monarchy with various forms of liberal democracy. Political theorists such as Alexis de Tocqueville analyzed mass society and pinpointed its beginning in the French Revolution.

Various conservative theorists developed concepts of mass society in which it replaces aristocracies with the "tyranny of the majority" or "mob rule" and José Ortega y Gasset, for instance, lamented the decline of high culture. Marxist accounts, such as those of the Frankfurt School, critiqued the prevailing forms of mass society as one dominated by a culture industry that served the interests of capitalism. However, Marxism-Leninism created its own form of mass society called bureaucratic collectivism by its critics. The idea of historic processes being driven exclusively by "laws of dialectics" highlighted the role of masses as the main field of social change, as opposed to individuals whose role is always negligible.

Mass society as an ideology can be seen as dominated by a small number of interconnected elites who control the conditions of life of the many, often by means of persuasion and manipulation. This indicates the politics of mass society theorists – they are advocates of various kinds of cultural elite who should be privileged and promoted over the masses, claiming for themselves both exemption from and leadership of the misguided masses.

"As technological innovation allowed government to expand, the centralized state grew in size and importance." "Since then, government has assumed responsibility for more and more areas of social life: schooling, regulating wages and working conditions, establishing standards for products of all sorts, and providing financial assistance to the elderly, the ill, and the unemployed." "In a mass society, power resides in large bureaucracies, leaving people in local communities with little control over their lives. For example, state officials mandate that local schools must meet educational standards, local products must be government-certified, and every citizen must maintain extensive tax records. Although such regulations may protect and enhance social equality, they also force individuals to deal increasingly with nameless officials in distant and often unresponsive bureaucracies, and they undermine the autonomy of families and local communities."

Mass society theory has been active in a wide range of media studies, where it tends to produce ideal visions of what the mass media such as television and cinema are doing to the masses. Therefore, the mass media are necessary instruments for achieving and maintaining mass societies. "The mass media give rise to national culture that washes over the traditional differences that used to set off one region from another." "Mass-society theorists fear that the transformation of people of various backgrounds into a generic mass may end up dehumanizing everyone."

Sociologist C. Wright Mills made a distinction between a society of "masses" and "public".

He states: "In a public, as we may understand the term,

1. virtually as many people express opinions as receive them,
2. Public communications are so organized that there is a chance immediately and effectively to answer back any opinion expressed in public.
3. Opinion formed by such discussion readily finds an outlet in effective action, even against – if necessary – the prevailing system of authority.
4. And authoritative institutions do not penetrate the public, which is thus more or less autonomous in its operations.

In a mass,

1. far fewer people express opinions than receive them; for the community of public becomes an abstract collection of individuals who receive impressions from the mass media.
2. The communications that prevail are so organized that it is difficult or impossible for the individual to answer back immediately or with any effect.
3. The realization of opinion in action is controlled by authorities who organize and control the channels of such action.
4. The mass has no autonomy from institutions; on the contrary, agents of authorized institutions penetrate this mass, reducing any autonomy it may have in the formation of opinion by discussion".

In The End of the Modern World (1957), theologian Romano Guardini wrote: "to either a greater or lesser degree mass man is convinced that his conformity [with mass society] is both reasonable and just".

== See also ==
- Civil society
- Consumerism
- Culture jamming
- Hoi polloi
- Media culture
- The Power Elite
- Social alienation
- Völkerpsychologie
- Welfare state

== Bibliography ==
- Arendt, Hannah 1961 Between Past and Future : Six Exercises in Political Thought, The Viking Press, New York, 1961,
- Biddiss, Michael D. 1977, The Age of the Masses, Penguin, Harmondsworth.
- Ginner, Salvador 1976, Mass Society, Academic Press
- Hartley, John 1982, Understanding News, Methuen, London.
- Kornhauser, Arthur William 1959, The Politics of mass society, The Free Press of Glencoe
- Lederer, Emil 1940, The state of the masses, W.W. Norton & Co, New York (H. Fertig, New York, 1967)
- Macionis, John J. (2009). Culture, society: The basics. 10th edition (pp. 496–98). Upper Saddle River, New Jersey: Prentice Hall Publishers.
- Marcel, Gabriel 2008 (written in the early 1950s), Man against Mass Society, St. Augustines Press
- McQuail, Denis 2005, McQuail's Mass Communication Theory (fifth edition), Sage, London.
- Mills, C. Wright 1956, The Power Elite, Oxford University Press, New York.
- Swingewood, Alan 1977, The Myth of Mass Culture, Macmillan, London.
- Wilmuth, Sidney 1976, Mass society, social organization, and democracy, Philosophical Library
