= Field research =

Collection of information outside a laboratory, library or workplace setting

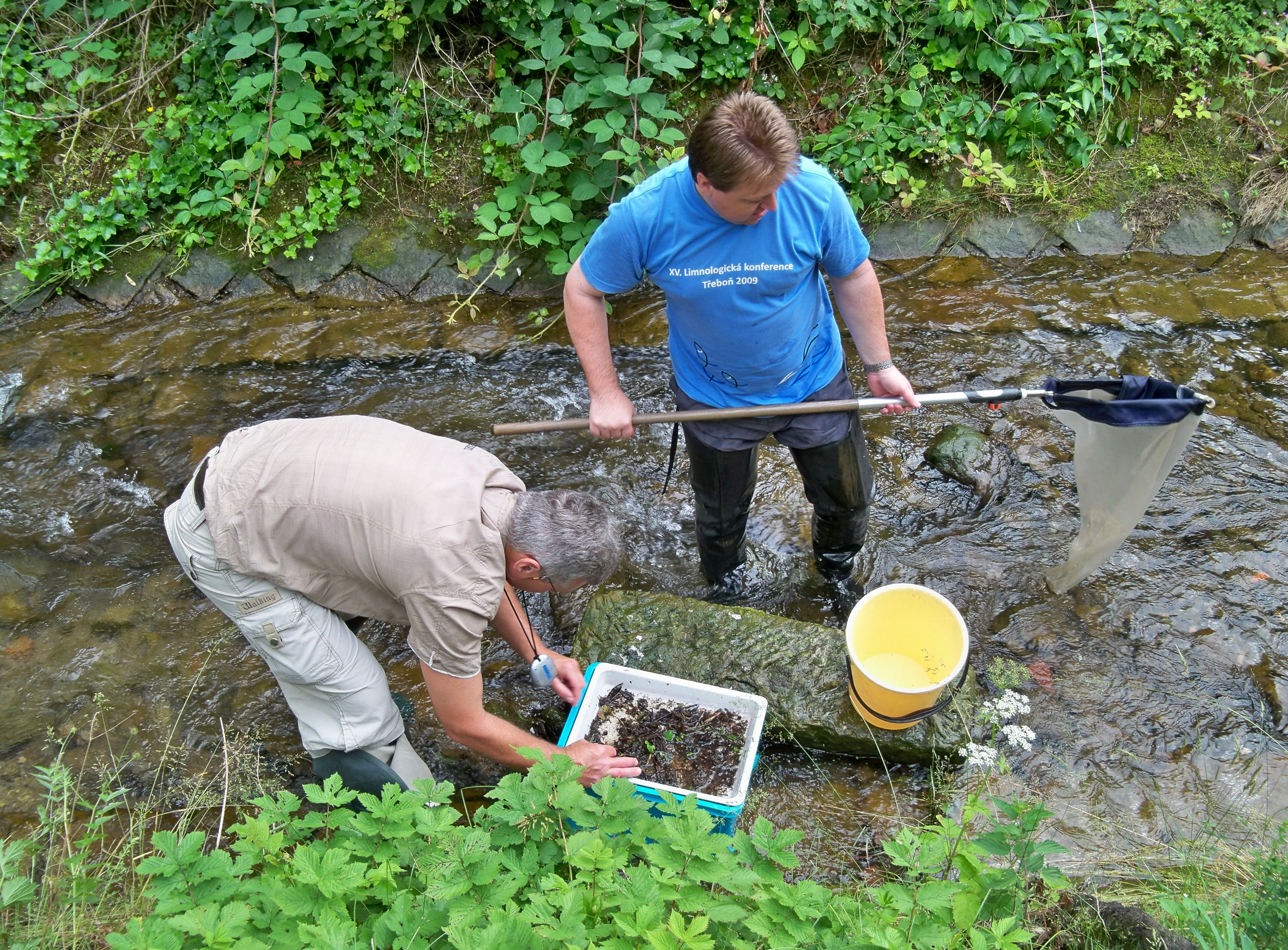
Biologists collecting information in the field

Field research, field studies, or fieldwork is the collection of raw data outside a laboratory, library, or workplace setting. The approaches and methods used in field research vary across disciplines. For example, biologists who conduct field research may simply observe animals interacting with their environments, whereas social scientists conducting field research may interview or observe people in their natural environments to learn their languages, folklore, and social structures.

Field research involves a range of well-defined, although variable, methods: informal interviews, direct observation, participation in the life of the group, collective discussions, analyses of personal documents produced within the group, self-analysis, results from activities undertaken off- or on-line, and life-histories. Although the method generally is characterized as qualitative research, it may (and often does) include quantitative dimensions.

== History ==
Field research has a long history. Cultural anthropologists have long used field research to study other cultures. Although the cultures do not have to be different, this has often been the case in the past with the study of so-called primitive cultures, and even in sociology the cultural differences have been ones of class. The work is done... in "'Fields' that is, circumscribed areas of study which have been the subject of social research". Fields could be education, industrial settings, or Amazonian rain forests. Field research may be conducted by ethologists such as Jane Goodall. Alfred Radcliffe-Brown [1910] and Bronisław Malinowski [1922] were early anthropologists who set the models for future work.

== Conducting field research ==
The quality of results obtained from field research depends on the data gathered in the field. The data in turn, depend upon the field worker, their level of involvement, and ability to see and visualize things that other individuals visiting the area of study may fail to notice. The more open researchers are to new ideas, concepts, and things which they may not have seen in their own culture, the better will be the absorption of those ideas. Better grasping of such material means a better understanding of the forces of culture operating in the area and the ways they modify the lives of the people under study. Social scientists (i.e. anthropologists, social psychologists, etc.) have always been taught to be free from ethnocentrism (i.e. the belief in the superiority of one's own ethnic group), when conducting any type of field research. Further, the researcher's cultural capital aids in the data collection process.

When humans themselves are the subject of study, protocols must be devised to reduce the risk of observer bias and the acquisition of too theoretical or idealized explanations of the workings of a culture. Participant observation, data collection, and survey research are examples of field research methods, in contrast to what is often called experimental or lab research.

== Field notes ==
When conducting field research, keeping an ethnographic record is essential to the process. Field notes are a key part of the ethnographic record. The process of field notes begin as the researcher participates in local scenes and experiences in order to make observations that will later be written up. The field researcher tries first to take mental notes of certain details in order that they be written down later.

=== Kinds of field notes ===
Field Note Chart

Types of Field Notes	Brief Description
Jot Notes	Key words or phrases are written down while in the field.
Field Notes Proper	A description of the physical context and the people involved, including their behavior and nonverbal communication.
Methodological Notes	New ideas that the researcher has on how to carry out the research project.
Journals and Diaries	These notes record the ethnographer's personal reactions, frustrations, and assessments of life and work in the field.

== Interviewing ==
Another method of data collection is interviewing, specifically interviewing in the qualitative paradigm. Interviewing can be done in different formats, this all depends on individual researcher preferences, research purpose, and the research question asked.

== Analyzing data ==
In qualitative research, there are many ways of analyzing data gathered in the field. One of the two most common methods of data analysis are thematic analysis and narrative analysis. As mentioned before, the type of analysis a researcher decides to use depends on the research question asked, the researcher's field, and the researcher's personal method of choice.

== Field research across different disciplines ==
=== Anthropology ===
In anthropology, field research is organized so as to produce a kind of writing called ethnography. Ethnography can refer to both a methodology and a product of research, namely a monograph or book. Ethnography is a grounded, inductive method that heavily relies on participant-observation. Participant observation is a structured type of research strategy. It is a widely used methodology in many disciplines, particularly, cultural anthropology, but also sociology, communication studies, and social psychology. Its aim is to gain a close and intimate familiarity with a given group of individuals (such as a religious, occupational, or sub cultural group, or a particular community) and their practices through an intensive involvement with people in their natural environment, usually over an extended period of time.

The method originated in field work of social anthropologists, especially the students of Franz Boas in the United States, and in the urban research of the Chicago School of sociology. Max Gluckman noted that Bronisław Malinowski significantly developed the idea of fieldwork, but it originated with Alfred Cort Haddon in England and Franz Boas in the United States. Robert G. Burgess concluded that "it is Malinowski who is usually credited with being the originator of intensive anthropological field research".

Anthropological fieldwork uses an array of methods and approaches that include, but are not limited to: participant observation, structured and unstructured interviews, archival research, collecting demographic information from the community the anthropologist is studying, and data analysis. Traditional participant observation is usually undertaken over an extended period of time, ranging from several months to many years, and even generations. An extended research time period means that the researcher is able to obtain more detailed and accurate information about the individuals, community, and/or population under study. Observable details (like daily time allotment) and more hidden details (like taboo behavior) are more easily observed and interpreted over a longer period of time. A strength of observation and interaction over extended periods of time is that researchers can discover discrepancies between what participants say—and often believe—should happen (the formal system) and what actually does happen, or between different aspects of the formal system; in contrast, a one-time survey of people's answers to a set of questions might be quite consistent, but is less likely to show conflicts between different aspects of the social system or between conscious representations and behavior.

=== Archaeology ===
Field research lies at the heart of archaeological research. It may include the undertaking of broad area surveys (including aerial surveys); more localised site surveys (including photographic, drawn, and geophysical surveys, and exercises such as fieldwalking); and excavation.

=== Biology and ecology ===
In biology, field research typically involves studying of free-living wild animals in which the subjects are observed in their natural habitat, without changing, harming, or materially altering the setting or behavior of the animals under study. Field research is an indispensable part of biological science.

Animal migration tracking (including bird ringing/banding) is a frequently used field technique, allowing field scientists to track migration patterns and routes, and animal longevity in the wild. Knowledge about animal migrations is essential to accurately determining the size and location of protected areas.

Field research also can involve study of other kingdoms of life, such as plantae, fungi, and microbes, as well as ecological interactions among species.

Field courses have been shown to be efficacious for generating long-term interest in and commitment for undergraduate students in STEM, but the number of field courses has not kept pace with demand. Cost has been a barrier to student participation.

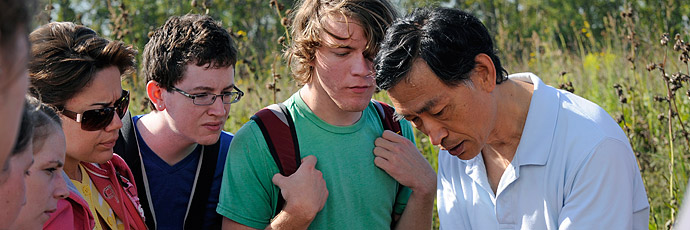
A biology class studying flora at a prairie, College of DuPage, United States

=== Consumer research ===
In applied business disciplines, such as in marketing, fieldwork is a standard research method both for commercial purposes, like market research, and academic research. For instance, researchers have used ethnography, netnography, and in-depth interviews within Consumer Culture Theory, a field that aims to understand the particularities of contemporary consumption. Several academic journals such as Consumption Markets & Culture, and the Journal of Consumer Research regularly publish qualitative research studies that use fieldwork.

=== Earth and atmospheric sciences ===
In geology fieldwork is considered an essential part of training and remains an important component of many research projects. In other disciplines of the Earth and atmospheric sciences, field research refers to field experiments (such as the VORTEX projects) utilizing in situ instruments. Permanent observation networks are also maintained for other uses but are not necessarily considered field research, nor are permanent remote sensing installations.

=== Economics ===
The objective of field research in economics is to get beneath the surface, to contrast observed behaviour with the prevailing understanding of a process, and to relate language and description to behavior (Deirdre McCloskey, 1985).

The 2009 Nobel Prize Winners in Economics, Elinor Ostrom and Oliver Williamson, have advocated mixed methods and complex approaches in economics and hinted implicitly to the relevance of field research approaches in economics. In a recent interview Oliver Williamson and Elinor Ostrom discuss the importance of examining institutional contexts when performing economic analyses. Both Ostrom and Williamson agree that "top-down" panaceas or "cookie cutter" approaches to policy problems don't work. They believe that policymakers need to give local people a chance to shape the systems used to allocate resources and resolve disputes. Sometimes, Ostrom points out, local solutions can be the most efficient and effective options. This is a point of view that fits very well with anthropological research, which has for some time shown us the logic of local systems of knowledge — and the damage that can be done when "solutions" to problems are imposed from outside or above without adequate consultation. Elinor Ostrom, for example, combines field case studies and experimental lab work in her research. Using this combination, she contested longstanding assumptions about the possibility that groups of people could cooperate to solve common pool problems, as opposed to being regulated by the state or governed by the market.

Edward J. Nell argued in 1998 that there are two types of field research in economics. One kind can give us a carefully drawn picture of institutions and practices, general in that it applies to all activities of a certain kind of particular society or social setting, but still specialized to that society or setting. Although institutions and practices are intangibles, such a picture will be objective, a matter of fact, independent of the state of mind of the particular agents reported on. Approaching the economy from a different angle, another kind of fieldwork can give us a picture of the state of mind of economic agents (their true motivations, their beliefs, state knowledge, expectations, their preferences and values).

Business use of field research is an applied form of anthropology and is as likely to be advised by sociologists or statisticians in the case of surveys. Consumer marketing field research is the primary marketing technique that is used by businesses to research their target market.

=== Ethnomusicology ===
Fieldwork in ethnomusicology has changed greatly over time. Alan P. Merriam cites the evolution of fieldwork as a constant interplay between the musicological and ethnological roots of the discipline. Before the 1950s, before ethnomusicology resembled what it is today, fieldwork and research were considered separate tasks. Scholars focused on analyzing music outside of its context through a scientific lens, drawing from the field of musicology. Notable scholars include Carl Stumf and Eric von Hornbostel, who started as Stumpf's assistant. They are known for making countless recordings and establishing a library of music to be analyzed by other scholars. Methodologies began to shift in the early 20th century. George Herzog, an anthropologist and ethnomusicologist, published a seminal paper titled "Plains Ghost Dance and Great Basin Music", reflecting the increased importance of fieldwork through his extended residency in the Great Basin and his attention to cultural contexts. Herzog also raised the question of how the formal qualities of the music he was studying demonstrated the social function of the music itself. Ethnomusicology today relies heavily on the relationship between the researcher and their teachers and consultants. Many ethnomusicologists have assumed the role of student in order to fully learn an instrument and its role in society. Research in the discipline has grown to consider music as a cultural product, and thus cannot be understood without consideration of context.

=== Law ===
Legal researchers conduct field research to understand how legal systems work in practice. Social, economic, cultural and other factors influence how legal processes, institutions and the law work (or do not work).

=== Management ===
Mintzberg played a crucial role in the popularization of field research in management. The tremendous amount of work that Mintzberg put into the findings earned him the title of leader of a new school of management, the descriptive school, as opposed to the prescriptive and normative schools that preceded his work. The schools of thought derive from Taylor, Henri Fayol, Lyndall Urwick, Herbert A. Simon, and others endeavored to prescribe and expound norms to show what managers must or should do. With the arrival of Mintzberg, the question was no longer what must or should be done, but what a manager actually does during the day. More recently, in his 2004 book Managers Not MBAs, Mintzberg examined what he believes to be wrong with management education today.

Aktouf (2006, p. 198) summed-up Mintzberg observations about what takes place in the field:‘’First, the manager’s job is not ordered, continuous, and sequential, nor is it uniform or homogeneous. On the contrary, it is fragmented, irregular, choppy, extremely changeable and variable. This work is also marked by brevity: no sooner has a manager finished one activity than he or she is called up to jump to another, and this pattern continues nonstop. Second, the manager’s daily work is a not a series of self-initiated, willful actions transformed into decisions, after examining the circumstances. Rather, it is an unbroken series of reactions to all sorts of request that come from all around the manager, from both the internal and external environments. Third, the manager deals with the same issues several times, for short periods of time; he or she is far from the traditional image of the individual who deals with one problem at a time, in a calm and orderly fashion. Fourth, the manager acts as a focal point, an interface, or an intersection between several series of actors in the organization: external and internal environments, collaborators, partners, superiors, subordinates, colleagues, and so forth. He or she must constantly ensure, achieve, or facilitate interactions between all these categories of actors to allow the firm to function smoothly.’’

=== Public health ===
In public health, the use of the term field research refers to epidemiology or the study of epidemics through the gathering of data about the epidemic (such as the pathogen and vector(s) as well as social or sexual contacts, depending upon the situation).

=== Sociology ===
Pierre Bourdieu played a crucial role in popularizing fieldwork in sociology. During the Algerian War in 1958–1962, Bourdieu undertook ethnographic research into the clash through a study of the Kabyle people (a subgroup of the Berbers), which provided the groundwork for his anthropological reputation. His first book, Sociologie de L'Algerie (The Algerians), was successful in France and published in America in 1962. A follow-up, Algeria 1960: The Disenchantment of the World: The Sense of Honour: The Kabyle House or the World Reversed: Essays, published in English in 1979 by Cambridge University Press, established him as a significant figure in the field of ethnology and a pioneer advocate scholar for more intensive fieldwork in social sciences. The book was based on his decade of work as a participant-observer in Algerian society. One of the outstanding qualities of his work has been his innovative combination of different methods and research strategies and his analytical skills in interpreting the obtained data.

Throughout his career, Bourdieu sought to connect his theoretical ideas with empirical research grounded in everyday life. His work can be seen as a sociology of culture, which Bourdieu labeled a "theory of practice". His contributions to sociology were both empirical and theoretical. His conceptual apparatus is based on three key terms: habitus, capital, and field.

Furthermore, Bourdieu fiercely opposed rational choice theory as grounded in a misunderstanding of how social agents operate. Bourdieu argued that social agents do not continuously calculate according to explicit rational and economic criteria. According to Bourdieu, social agents operate according to an implicit practical logic—a practical sense—and bodily dispositions. Social agents act according to their "feel for the game" (the "feel" being, roughly, habitus, and the "game" being the field).

Bourdieu's anthropological work was focused on the analysis of the mechanisms of reproduction of social hierarchies. Bourdieu criticized the primacy given to the economic factors, and stressed that the capacity of social actors to actively impose and engage their cultural productions and symbolic systems plays an essential role in the reproduction of social structures of domination. Bourdieu's empirical work played a crucial role in the popularization of correspondence analysis and particularly multiple correspondence analysis. Bourdieu held that these geometric techniques of data analysis are, like his sociology, inherently relational. In the preface to his book The Craft of Sociology, Bourdieu argued that: "I use Correspondence Analysis very much, because I think that it is essentially a relational procedure whose philosophy fully expresses what in my view constitutes social reality. It is a procedure that 'thinks' in relations, as I try to do it with the concept of field."

One of the classic ethnographies in Sociology is the book Ain't No Makin' It: Aspirations & Attainment in a Low-Income Neighborhood by Jay MacLeod. The study addresses the reproduction of social inequality among low-income, male teenagers. The researcher spent time studying two groups of teenagers in a housing project in a Northeastern city of the United States. The study concludes that three different levels of analysis play their part in the reproduction of social inequality: the individual, the cultural, and the structural.

An additional perspective of sociology includes interactionism. This point of view focuses on understanding people's actions based on their experience of the world around them. Similar to Bourdieu's work, this perspective gathers statements, observations and facts from real-world situations to create more robust research outcomes.

== Notable field-workers ==
=== In anthropology ===
- Napoleon Chagnon - ethnographer of the Yanomamö people of the Amazon
- Georg Forster - ethnographer (1772–1775) to Captain James Cook
- George M. Foster
- Clifford Geertz
- Alfred Cort Haddon
- Claude Lévi-Strauss
- Bronislaw Malinowski
- Margaret Mead
- Alfred Reginald Radcliffe-Brown
- W.H.R. Rivers
- Renato Rosaldo
- James C. Scott
- Colin Turnbull
- Victor Turner

=== In sociology ===
- William Foote Whyte
- Erving Goffman
- Pierre Bourdieu
- Harriet Martineau

=== In management ===
- Henry Mintzberg

=== In economics ===
- Truman Bewley
- Alan Blinder
- Trygve Haavelmo
- John Johnston
- Lawrence Klein
- Wassily Leontief
- Edward J. Nell
- Robert M. Townsend

=== In music ===
- Alan Lomax
- John Peel (with his Peel Sessions)

== See also ==
- Citizen science
- Empirical research
- Exploration
- Observational study
- Participant observation
- Public Health Advisor
- Wildlife observation
- Market research
- Usability
- Industrial design
- Requirements analysis
