= Consumer culture theory =

Study of consumption choices and behaviors

Consumer culture theory (CCT) is the study of consumption from a social and cultural point of view, as opposed to an economic or psychological one.

CCT does not offer a grand unifying theory but "refers to a family of theoretical perspectives that address the dynamic relationships between consumer actions, the marketplace, and cultural meanings". Reflective of a post-modernist society, CCT views cultural meanings as being numerous and fragmented and hence views culture as an amalgamation of different groups and shared meanings, rather than a homogeneous construct (such as the American culture).

Consumer culture is viewed as "social arrangement in which the relations between lived culture and social resources, between meaningful ways of life and the symbolic and material resources on which they depend, are mediated through markets" and consumers as part of an interconnected system of commercially produced products and images which they use to construct their identity and orient their relationships with others.

== Methodology ==
There is a widely held misperception by people outside CCT researchers that this field is oriented toward the study of consumption contexts. Memorable study contexts, such as the Harley-Davidson subculture or the Burning Man festival probably fueled this perspective, which is far from the theory development aim of this school of thought. Some academic journals associated with research on consumer culture theory are Journal of Consumer Research, Consumption Markets & Culture, and Marketing Theory.

CCT is often associated with qualitative methodologies, such as interviews, case studies, ethnography, and netnography, because they are suitable to study the experiential, sociological and cultural aspects of consumption. However, CCT researchers use a variety of methods

== Fields of study ==
In 2005, Arnould and Thompson identified four research programs in CCT:

- Consumer identity projects, such as Schau & Gilly study on personal web space, which studied how consumers create a coherent self through marketer-produced materials
- Marketplace culture. These studies look at consumers as culture producers. Some examples include subcultures of consumption, brand communities, and consumer tribes.
- Mass-mediated marketplace ideologies and consumers' interpretive strategies, such as Kozinets study of the Burning Man Festival, which looked at consumer ideologies and identities are influenced by economic and cultural globalisation and how cultural product systems orient consumers toward certain ideologies or identity projects.
- Sociohistoric patterning of consumption, such as Holt study which looked at the influence of social capital on consumption choices.
