= Ema Berta =

Portuguese artist (1944–2021)

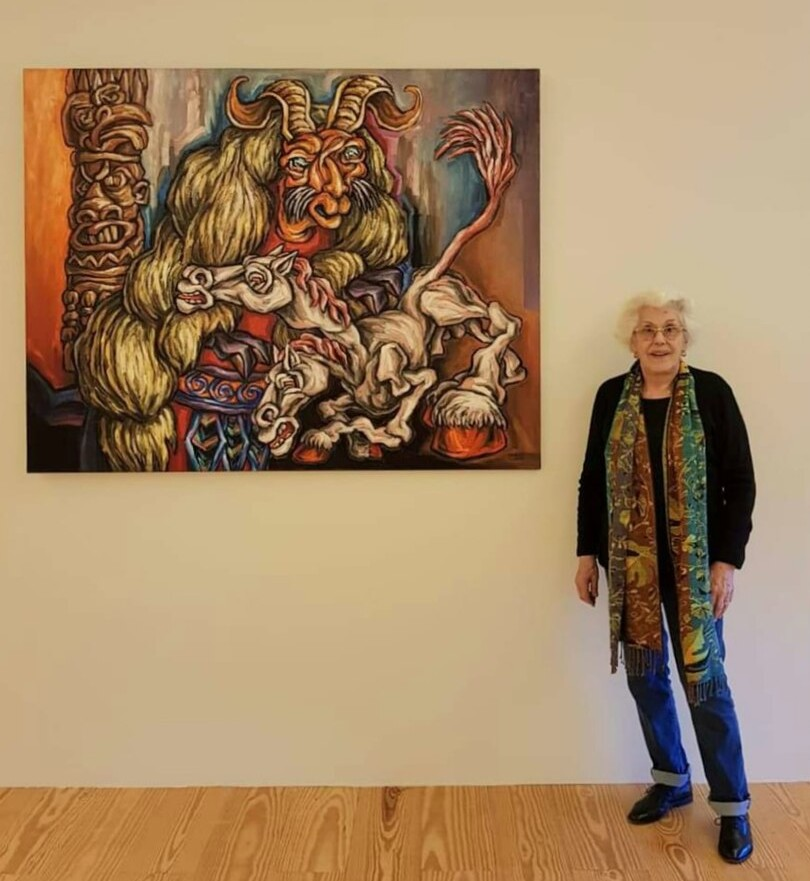
- Ema Berta at the opening of her exhibition The Luminous Exaltation of Shadows, on display at the Anadir Afonso Museum of Contemporary Art, Chaves.
- Born: Ema Berta Sena dos Santos; 13 February 1944; Sintra, Portugal
- Died: 8 July 2021 (aged 77); Cascais, Portugal
- Known for: Painting

Ema Berta Sena dos Santos (1944–2021) was a Portuguese painter and art teacher.

== Early life and education ==
Berta was born on 13 February 1944 in Sintra in Portugal. She graduated in painting from the Lisbon School of Fine Arts and also studied Germanic philology.

== Career ==
Berta was a drawing teacher at the Ricardo Espírito Santo Foundation, which was set up to serve as a "School-Museum of Decorative Arts". She also worked in France and Canada. For five years she was a member of the board of directors of the National Society of Fine Arts (SNBA) of Portugal. From the late 1990s she lived alternately in Lisbon and Paris, maintaining a studio in Paris and settling there between 2003 and 2010. During this period, she developed a close relationship with several intellectuals, including the artist, Gérard Garouste, the philosopher, Gilles Lipovetsky and the psychoanalyst, Pierre Lévy-Soussan, who noted that "Ema Berta allows us to re-enchant the world, our world."

Berta's artistic style has been described as neo-figuratism or new figurative art. She worked in oils, using the impasto technique. She tended to produce works in series, beginning with those named Elasippos, and Girls, in which the presentation of women, adolescents and children was deeply sexualized. Her larger series began at the end of the 1980s with Forests and Seas. With this, her work became more abstract and this was also evident in other series, such as Indians and Other People, inspired by her visit to Canada and marked by an awareness of multiculturalism, Feline Beings, and Rainbow Forests. She also worked in ceramics, decorating some pieces for the Fábrica de Cerâmica da Viúva Lamego tile producer in Sintra.

== Exhibitions and collections ==
Berta held solo exhibitions at the National Society of Fine Arts in 1987, 1988, 1991, 1993, and 2015. Her last solo exhibition, The Luminous Exaltation of Shadows, was held at the Nadir Afonso Museum in Chaves, Portugal in 2018–19, to which she had donated several of her paintings from the Indians and Other People series in 2017. Other exhibitions included those at the Galerie de La Maison de l'Europe and the Galerie Etienne de Causans in Paris; the Palace of Mafra in Mafra and the Jerónimos Monastery in Belém, both in Portugal; the Consulate of Portugal in Toronto, Canada; and the Museum of Modern Art, Rio de Janeiro.

Berta's work is held in many public and private collections, including those of the Bank of Portugal, the Caixa Geral de Depósitos bank, the Museu da Água (Water Museum) in Lisbon, the Carlos Machado Museum in Ponta Delgada in the Azores, and the Sintra Municipal Museum.

== Death ==
Barta died on 8 July 2021 at Cascais hospital. Among those to pay tribute was the Portuguese Minister of Culture, Graça Fonseca.
