= Digital leisure studies =

Sub-discipline in leisure studies

Digital leisure studies is an academic interdisciplinary sub-discipline of leisure studies that focuses on the study of digital leisure cultures, including digital leisure practices, experiences, spaces, communities, institutions, and subjectivities. It is an area of scholarship aimed at making sense of the place of digital leisure “in understandings of embodiment, power relations, social inequalities, social structures and social institutions”. To do so, leisure scholars use theoretical and methodological approaches from within leisure studies as well as from other academic disciplines such as political science, history, communication studies, cultural studies, philosophy, sociology, geography, anthropology, and others. Scholars in this field also focus on how to engage digital practices to make their research accessible, and focus on exposing, examining, and challenging social inequalities and injustices related to digital leisure.

== Digital leisure ==
Digital leisure, similar to leisure, is a contentious term. Leisure has traditionally been defined in three main ways, as time (that which is not work), as activity (freely chosen), and as a state of mind (denoted by such things as intrinsic motivation, perceived freedom, and positive affect). Digital leisure practices and spaces are intertwined with work in ways that physical leisure spaces are not. Widespread surveillance of digital leisure practices and spaces allows companies to benefit monetarily from the data collected during the users’ leisure experiences (hence, the user is indeed working during their leisure time). Therefore, digital leisure is time spent engaged in digital practices and spaces while in a leisurely state of mind.

== Digital leisure cultures ==
Traditionally, leisure scholars have focused on analogue leisure cultures such as sports, outdoor activities, fandom, and summer camps. In a digital age, there are very few (if any) pure analogue leisure spaces in existence. Most leisure cultures have been digitized in some way. With wearable fitness trackers digitizing every aspect of our leisure (even our sleep) and smartphones-turned-watches, our very leisured bodies have become digital assemblages. Lupton noted how the metaphor of entanglement is commonly used to explain our relationship with digitization, as it “emphasizes the inextricably intertwined relationships of human subjects with material objects” (p. 41). As such, digital leisure cultures refer to the digitization of previous analogue areas of leisure research. Digital leisure cultures “covers some of the following technologies and practices which have built cultures around them: namely apps (applications), smartphones, online games, interaction on some form of social media, and the downloading of films, live televised sports events and music”.

Brabazon has identified two systemic ways in which analogue leisure cultures and digital cultures differ: deterritorialization and disintermediation. Deterritorilization refers to the ways digitization is post-territory. As a concept, it captures “how particular media platforms and communicative systems de-emphasize our position in analogue space and time in favour of virtual space and time”. For example, Brabazon used the example of social media. We can join Pinterest, Twitter, Facebook – and we can be involved in and share content in each of these distinct spaces with each other, even if we do not share physical space with each other.

Disintermediation refers to the ways in which digital leisure cultures involve “peer-to-peer networks where links are removed from the traditional supply chain”. As part of these networks, the producer can also be the consumer (prosumer). In this way, material in digital leisure cultures can be created and disseminated much more quickly than in analogue leisure cultures.

== Digital turn: theories and methodologies ==
Leisure studies (and academia in general) currently exists in the age of the “digital turn.” The digital turn refers to the different ways digitization influences our lives, including our behaviors, social interactions, environments, economies, and politics. The digital turn signifies a new period in leisure scholarship and demands a conceptual change, one in which leisure scholars turn to new resources and ways of capturing what digitization means for our lives and leisure Redheadnoted, leisure scholars “need to produce sustained theorizing of the “digital turn” in Leisure Studies and with it more satisfactory theoretically informed empirical studies of digital leisure cultures” (p. 828) to engage in broader scholarly conversations.

To do so, it has been suggested leisure scholars shift the ways they are thinking about leisure and draw on different disciplines and theories as resources to begin to shape digital leisure theory and theorizing. For example, Redhead has recommended that digital leisure theory be shaped by critical theory and critical theorists from other disciplines such as philosophers, including Baudrillard, Badiou, Zizek, and Virilio. Redhead presented two concepts to guide digital leisure theory: accelerated culture and claustropolitanism.

Karl Spracklen has presented a theory of communicative and instrumental digital leisure drawing on theorists such as Habermas, Catells, Urry, and Bauman. He argued that digital leisure is more communicative given its possibilities for interactivity and resisting power disparities, but despite these possibilities, it is not immune to instrumental structures that shape traditional (non-digitized) popular leisure. In this way, digital leisure should not be seen as something novel, but as “just another leisure space.” In his work, he has also emphasized the work of leisure theorists, such as Rojek, Stebbins, Aitchison, Blackshaw, Giulianotti and Crouch, who have focused attention towards understanding and critically engaging with digital leisure.

With the digital turn in research, also comes the need to consider methodologies and methods used to effectively study digital leisure cultures. Digital leisure scholars are still actively working to envision new methodologies and methods and retool existing ones. Netnography, virtual ethnography /cyberethnography/digital ethnography, digital storytelling, digital and visual methodologies, digital media methodologies, and critical technocultural discourse analysis are some examples of such methodologies and methods.
