= Consumption Markets & Culture =

Academic peer-reviewed journal in the field of marketing and consumer research

- Discipline: Marketing
- Language: English
- Edited by: Alan Bradshaw, Joel Hietanen

Publication details
- History: 1997–present
- Publisher: Routledge
- Frequency: Bimonthly
- Open access: Hybrid
- Impact factor: 1.9 (2023)

Standard abbreviations
- ISO 4: Consum. Mark. Cult.

Indexing
- ISSN: 1025-3866 (print); 1477-223X (web)
- LCCN: 2003213626
- OCLC no.: 782276790

Links
- Journal homepage; Online access; Online archive

Consumption Markets & Culture is a peer-reviewed academic journal covering the field of marketing, consumption, consumer culture, and consumer behavior. It is published by Routledge and the editors-in-chief are Alan Bradshaw (University of London) and Joel Hietanen (University of Helsinki). The journal was established in 1997 with A. Fuat Firat as the founding editor. The journal was associated with research from consumer culture theory, an approach that studies consumption from a social and cultural point of view.

== Abstracting and indexing ==
The journal is abstracted and indexed in Scopus and the Social Sciences Citation Index. According to the Journal Citation Reports, its 2023 impact factor is 1.9.
