= Gilles Lipovetsky =

French philosopher, writer and sociologist (born 1944)

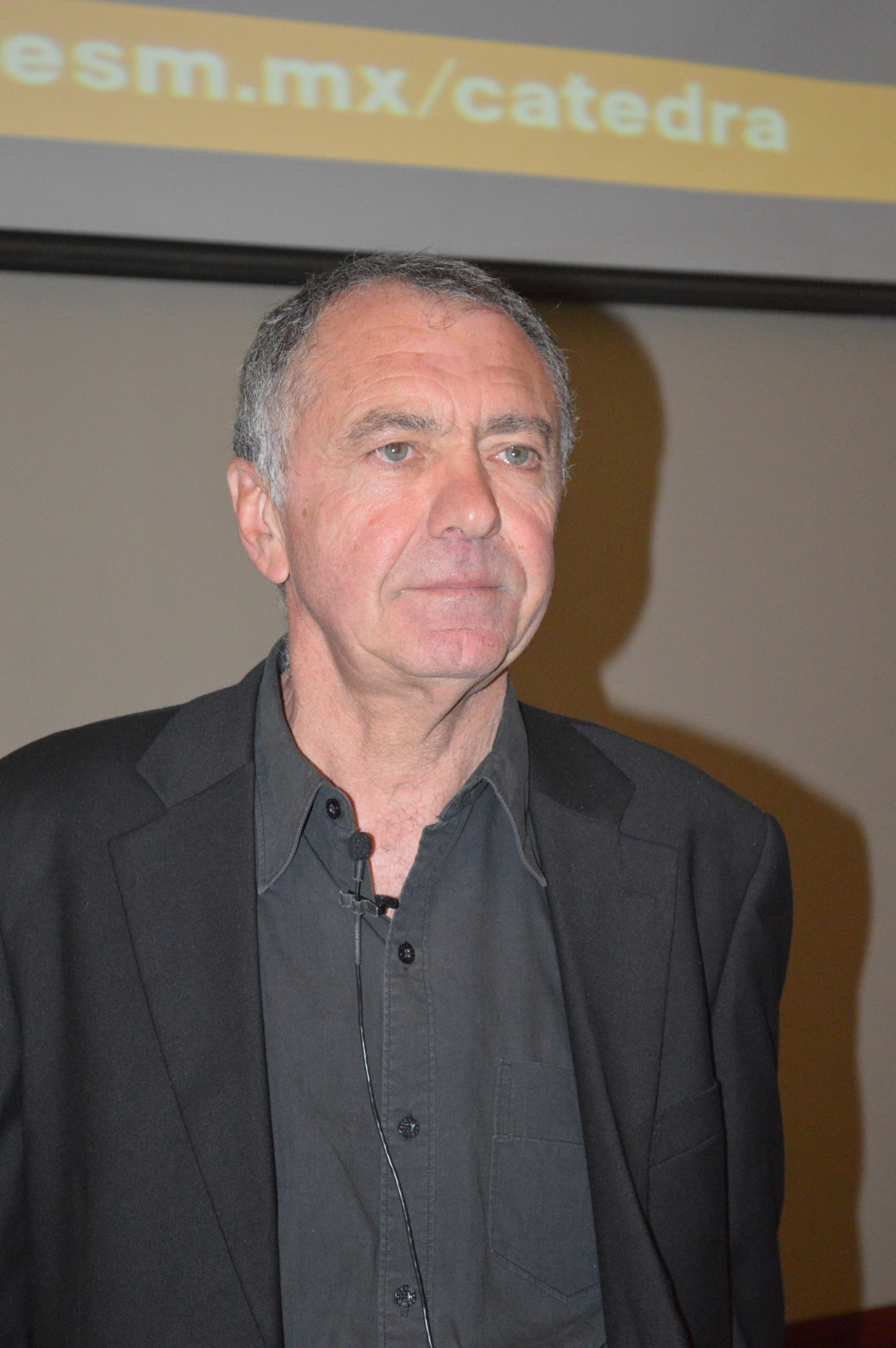
- Born: 24 September 1944 (age 82); Millau, France

Education
- Education: University of Paris

Philosophical work
- Era: Contemporary philosophy
- Region: Western philosophy
- School: Continental philosophy Western Marxism (early); Postmodernism (late)
- Institutions: Academy of Grenoble
- Main interests: Cultural criticism
- Notable ideas: Hypermodernity, hyperconsumerism

Gilles Lipovetsky (French: [lipɔvɛtski]; born 24 September 1944) is a French philosopher, writer, and sociologist.

== Life and career ==
Lipovetsky was born in Millau in 1944. He studied philosophy at the University of Paris, and participated in the 1968 student uprising in Paris to change the French educational model. However, he criticizes the model that came from that as producing alienated individuals with fragile personalities prone to emotional disorder due to hedonism and immediate gratification.

He began his academic career teaching classes with his alma mater. With the success of his first book, he became well-known in many parts of the world and became one of the most important French intellectuals of the latter 20th century.

Along with tenure, he has received two honorary doctorates from the Université de Sherbrooke in Québec (Canada) and from the New Bulgarian University in Sofia, membership in the Conseil d'analyse de la société of the French government, knighthood in the Legion of Honor, membership in the National Council of Programs and is a consultant with the Association of Management Progress. In 2015, 2016 and 2017, he was a member of the Prix Versailles judges panel.

== Thought ==
Lipovetsky began his philosophical career as a Marxist, similar to many others in the 1960s. He joined the Socialisme ou Barbarie group – Lipovetsky wrote "We want the world and we want it now, but not to transform it, but to swallow it up." However, since then, his philosophy has changed significantly, including the acceptance of capitalism as "the only legitimate economic model." When questioned about his change in stance from his Marxist beginning he replies "Only idiots never change opinion."

Lipovetsky's work focuses on the modern world from the latter 20th century to the present. He has divided this period into three periods: "Marxist self-criticism" (1965–1983), post-modern (1983–1991) and the hyper-modern period (from 1991 on). This began with his 1983 book, which declared the world to be post-modern, characterized by extreme individualism and the dissolution of politics based on political parties, turning its back on a strong sense of social duty on which democracy and socialism depend. However, by the end of the 2000s, he proposed that this term had become obsolete and unable to describe the world past 1991. He then proposed "hyper-modern," similar to post-modern but with a superlative and unstoppable meaning, focusing on new technologies, markets, and global culture.

From his 1983 book which brought him to prominence, Lipovetsky has continued to write on topics such as modernity, globalization, consumerism, modern culture, markets, feminism, fashion, and media, but they have the common thread of individualism. He defines individualism as the desire to break with tradition and the past and to look towards the future and our own pleasure. In 1987 he wrote L'Empire de l'éphémère : la mode et son destin dans les sociétés modernes continuing the argument of the 1983 work focusing on fashion as a reflection of individualism and hyper consumerism. It also indicates the desire to be young forever and that only the here-and-now exists. In 1992 he published Le Crépuscule du devoir. In this work, he states that the vision of a secular world started with Martin Luther's revolt against the Catholic Church, leading to the idea that one purpose of God is to define and protect individual rights. In La Troisième femme in 1997 he argues the idea that the women's liberation movement is strongly connected to hyper-consumerism as women are the main customers of luxury goods. In Métamorphoses de la culture libérale – Éthique, médias, entreprise in 2002, he examines the paradoxes of hyper-modern democracies, with emphasis both on the individual, regionalization vs. globalization and the collective and a society that is both open and closed, concluding that they are interdependent. The 2003 book Le luxe éternel examines the concept of luxury over human history. Le bonheur paradoxal. Essai sur la société d'hyperconsommation (2006) examines the multiplication and globalization of major brands and the connection between fashion and luxury which is the basis of hyper-consumerism. In La société de déception (2006) he analyzes the concept of disappointment following the work of Jacques Lacan that desire creates a vacuum and can never be filled. In L'écran global. Culture-médias et cinéma à l'âge hypermoderne (2007) he analyses a "second modern revolution" declaring the end of post-modernism, arguing that paradoxes are multiplying due to the complexity of modern life. His 2013 book, L'esthétisation du monde : vivre à l'âge du capitalisme artiste focuses on capitalism and its relationship to art, especially the cinema.

Lipovetsky has made provocative statements on modern life and elements related to it, which have been often at odds with intellectual trends of the last decades. He has compared fashion with democracy as unstable, ephemeral and superficial, but states it as a positive and more workable than a more interdependent society. He states that the focus of modern life is the new, which then quickly becomes old and we look for something else, leading to his notion of "hyper" as this need for new becomes faster in the age of Internet and social media, which also breaks down traditional institutions such as nation and family. Even "culture" succumbs to this, according to him, as people go to museums more as tourists rather than for education. The need for new triggers hyper-consumerism, with people trying to keep up with trends, and creating frustration among the poorer who cannot keep up. However, he makes a distinction between hyper-consumerism and consumerism. He does not criticize the latter, which he says has had positives in rising living standards. He believes that consumption should be a means to an end, not an end in itself and believes that concerns such as ecology are not incompatible with capitalism.

Lipovetsky does not have a well-defined style of presentation, varying among manners of speaking similar to that of a psychologist or sociologist as well as a philosopher often gesturing emphatically. His methodology varies as well, often dealing with paradoxes. His approach to issues is almost nonexistent epistemologically. There is also a strong influence in his writing from French literature although he does not write fiction.

== Publications ==
- L'ère du vide : Essais sur l'individualisme contemporain, Gallimard, 1983
- L'Empire de l'éphémère : la mode et son destin dans les sociétés modernes, Gallimard, 1987
- Le Crépuscule du devoir, Gallimard, 1992
- La Troisième femme, Gallimard, 1997
- Métamorphoses de la culture libérale – Éthique, médias, entreprise, Montréal, Édition Liber, 2002
- Le luxe éternel (with Elyette Roux), éditions Gallimard, 2003
- Les temps hypermodernes, éditions Grasset, 2004
- Le bonheur paradoxal. Essai sur la société d'hyperconsommation, éditions Gallimard, 2006
- La société de déception, éditions Textuel, 2006
- L'écran global. Culture-médias et cinéma à l'âge hypermoderne (with Jean Serroy), Seuil, 2007
- La Culture-monde. Réponse à une société désorientée, Paris, Odile Jacob, 2008 (with Jean Serroy)
- L'Occident mondialisé : Controverse sur la culture planétaire, Paris, Grasset, 2010 (with Hervé Juvin)

== See also ==
- Homo consumericus
