= Consumer identity =

Consumer identity is the consumption pattern through which a consumer describes themselves.

== Analysis ==
One of the most prominent features of the modern era is the rise of consumerism which was made possible by the emergence of a major middle class and the availability of different varieties of merchandise in an open market. According to Nitha Mathur, a professor of Sociology at the Indira Gandhi National Open University, "Commercial brands and luxury commodities have come to serve as signifiers of identity in society and legitimized consumer culture that is made visible in terms of its referents: images, commodities and 'high-class' consumption as also their articulation in daily lives of people." Mathur further explained that, "by choice or by compulsion, people interpret and respond to it in different ways as they construct, deconstruct and reconstruct their social identities."

== Theoretical background ==
The identity bestowed on consumers is understood to draw from themes that cut across the different symbolic boundaries that have consolidated in the course of modernity. Consumer research, and in particular consumer culture theory, has extensively examined how interactions with products help consumers to shape their identities and selves. Product design, for instance, can elicit infatuation in object–consumer relations. Consumers may become attached and develop relationships to specific material objects, independently of these objects' brands.

A variety of commodities serves as an increasingly sophisticated identity toolkit for the celebration of one's identity. These do not only include unconscious somatic involvement. The idea that everyone in consumer societies is more open to acquiring the lifestyle and identity they desire runs the risk of painting an imaginary world made of equal opportunity and free self-realization. Instead, it is clear, even through observing advertisements which celebrate consumption as a sphere of human realization, that only a particular type of identity, a certain kind of look, a particular way of being in the world, and, apparently, only certain commodities are acknowledged as plainly positive, and that they all demand growing shares of economic and cultural capital.

== Social identity ==
People's activities and possessions are organized around their social identities—the multifaceted labels by which their "me" is recognized by themselves and members of society. Identities differ from traits, such as aggressiveness or honesty, in that the latter characterizes how someone behaves within an Identity. Social identities (accountant, golfer, parent) are derived from social roles, but they are not the same. Roles are consensual prescriptions, behaviors expected of those occupying a particular position in society, and in that sense, they partition a society.

Social Identity Theory was developed by Tajfel and Turner in 1979. Their theory was originally developed to understand the psychological basis of intergroup discrimination. Tajfel et al. (1971) attempted to identify minimum conditions that would lead members of one group to discriminate for the in-group to which they belonged and against another out-group.

Henri Tajfel's greatest contribution to psychology was the social identity theory. Social identity is a person's sense of who they are, based on their group membership(s).

Tajfel (1979) proposed that the groups (e.g. social class, family, football team, etc.), which people belonged to were a source of pride and self-esteem. Groups give us a sense of social identity: a sense of belonging to the social world.

The social roles we ascribe to ourselves are the basis of our social identities and collectively, these identities form our global self—our overall sense of who we are. This identity-to-global self-path operationalizes social identity theory's guiding premise that one's overall sense of self, derives from the particular identities that one enacts and ascribes to one's self.

=== Consumer gender ===
Earlier gender identity and consumer behavior research suggests that gender identity plays a role in consumer behavior and the construction of consumer identity. Varying from assisting in information processing, to connecting individuals to the rest of the world, to orchestrating an individual's perceptions, to developing one's attitudes about appropriate social behaviors.

Regarding consumers' brand perceptions, it was explained that consumer brand consumption is congruent with consumer gender-image, and stated that the gender-self could generate strong gender-congruency effects with regards to brand loyalty. For example, consumers prefer goods or spokespersons that match their sense of masculinity and femininity.

Edward Bernays was a public relations pioneer in the 20th century who sometimes used the theory of consumer identity in order to sell products to desired target groups. One incident of this was the targeting of feminist activists in an attempt to sell more cigarettes to women, branding cigarettes as Torches of Freedom. This action took advantage of the consumer identity of women who aspired to equal purchasing habits to men to advocate a specific product to this group.

=== Consumer and class ===
From basic property to define, it is the group of people who can buy qualified goods and services; they do not only buy for the basic need. It would roughly divide the consumers, according to their capability of purchase from the society and from history. A class is marked by a set of conditions, in one place and time, but the fluidity of the construction, rather than the concept, of class, means that markers change categories like gender and race. It is a persistent social construct which is fluid across time and place, and increasingly, is downplayed in contemporary social rhetoric. But considering different target of the brands and difficulty in satisfying the critical consumers, more brands prefer to demonstrate their distinct characteristic through some special aesthetic value, in Gramscian, the hegemonic ideologies of consumerism and neoliberalism give rise to the 'common sense' understanding that shopping provides opportunities to assert free choice in a society which proclaims equality and personal responsibility.

=== Consumer and ethnicity ===
Ethnicity is both an automatic characteristic of racial group membership and a process of group identification in which people use ethnic labels to define themselves and others. During the process of purchase, it also considers other elements that a product that is formerly associated with a specific ethnic group is detached from its roots and marketed to other subcultures through buying the same brand's products. Group members tend to be tightly knit, and they are likely to infer meanings that go beyond the spoken word. Also, we should turn the focus onto the physical part, which is existing and objective without any judgment of body shapes or body measurements, or the ratios of different ethnic groups are imperative to determine any differences. However, differently shaped consumers require differently shaped apparel to accommodate figure variations the classification of female body shapes within a specific country is, however, a challenge due to variations within and across ethnically homogeneous and heterogeneous populations.

== Brands and consumer identity ==
Consumers construct their identities through their brand choices based on congruence between brand image and self-image. Thus, the meaning and value of a brand is not just its ability to express the self, but also its role in helping consumers create and build their self-identities. This is one of the main issues today that cause money hungry corporate officials to hinder other individuals hard work. Possessions can be used to satisfy psychological needs, such as actively creating one's self-concept, reinforcing and expressing self-identity, and allowing one to differentiate oneself and assert one's individuality. Possessions can also serve a social purpose by reflecting social ties to one's family, community, and/or cultural groups, including brand communities

Consumers form connections to brands that become meaningful through this process; self-brand connections measure the extent to which individuals have incorporated brands into their self-concept

== Consumer communities ==
Cultivated identity or identity construction and formation is the shaping of a person's beliefs, values, practices, and knowledge; influenced both by cultural systems and by individual actions in attempts to create, enhance, or maintain the views about one's self. The creation and preservation of the self is signaled to others through the exchange of identity capital. It is common for members of consumer communities to develop a sense of shared identity.

Identity construction is a key issue in anthropological study. In an anthropological context uses of identity are basically ambiguous: "In one sense, the term refers to properties of uniqueness and individuality, the essential differences making a person distinct from all others, as in 'self-identity'. In another sense, it refers to qualities of sameness, in that persons may associate themselves, or be associated by others, with groups or categories on the basis of some common feature, …"

A fan community or 'fandom' is a social unit of any size composed of people, known as fans, who are enthusiastically devoted to someone or something, such as a band, sports team, genre, book, movie, or entertainer above other cultural objects. "Peer fans, that is individuals with whom we connect via shared liking of these cultural objects, gather in groups making up for communities of practice around the object of fandom." A definition of fandom indicates two characteristics of these communities: "they are a collective of people (1) who share (2) an appreciation of a (pop) cultural artifacts." In other words, a fan community is a group of people characterized by a feeling of empathy and companionship with others who share a common interest. In our case, this common interest is the brand. Fans recognize themselves through the congruency between the brand image and the self-image.

== See also ==
- Consumer culture theory
- Gender advertisement
- Social identity theory
- Consumer Activism
- Consumer Protection
