= Leisure studies =

Branch of the social sciences

Leisure studies is a branch of the social sciences that focuses on understanding and analyzing leisure. Recreation and tourism are common topics of leisure research.

The National Recreation and Park Association is the national organization in the United States for leisure studies, and offers accreditation to many universities to offer courses of study (degree programs) in leisure studies.

The Journal of Leisure Research and Journal of Park and Recreation Administration are some scholarly US academic journals of leisure studies.

== History ==
While leisure studies has existed for much longer, a first centralized organization for directing leisure studies was established in Birmingham, England, in May 1975, and is known as the Leisure Studies Association. In 1984, the first international conference was held by the LSA at the University of Sussex in Brighton, which also set the record as the largest LSA event held to date with over 275 attendees. LSA conferences are widely regarded as some of the most attended events for leisure researchers in the world.

== Education ==
Pursuing a degree in leisure studies will give students the opportunity to learn how to incorporate leisure into recreational activities and tourism. Students take a wide variety of classes ranging from psychology and social sciences to biology and anatomy. Students learn how to improve and foster a healthy life through leisure.

== Leisure activities ==
The leisure activities that people who work in leisure studies deal with include a very broad range of activities. Most of the activities can be separated into 3 sub-categories: sport and recreation, tourism, and general leisure. Sport and recreation activities is one of the broadest categories in leisure studies. This includes sports, both traditional and non-traditional, and any indoor or outdoor physical activities done for recreational purposes. Sport and recreation activities includes, but is not limited to, swimming, running, hiking, weight lifting, playing games and other outdoor recreation.

Tourism describes the traveling for leisure purposes. Destinations include parks and national parks, hikes, and domestic and foreign cities.

General leisure encompasses all other activities that are not part of sport, recreation, or tourism. This broad category includes yoga, the arts, nature conservation, and various other hobbies.

== Career opportunities ==
A bachelor's degree in leisure studies qualifies graduates for a wide range of entry level recreational occupations in the private and public sectors. Leisure Service jobs involve a variety of leisure, recreational and sport settings for all age groups, populations, and diverse geographical locations. The U.S. Bureau of Labor Statistics report that 345,400 recreation worker jobs existed in the U.S. as of 2012 and the mean annual wage for a recreation worker was $25,430. The leisure studies field is expected to grow 14% from 2012–2022. This is growing as fast as the average of all jobs and is potentially due to increasing childhood obesity rates and the aging baby-boomers generation.

Work settings include:

- Rehabilitation centers
- State and municipal parks
- Schools
- Camps
- Coaching
- Athletic programs
- Fitness centers
- Sporting organizations and businesses
- Correctional facilities
- Non-profit organizations
- Community centers
- Hospitality services
- Nursing homes

Industries that employed the most recreation/leisure workers in 2012 and average annual salary:

Industry	Percent employed	Avg. annual salary
Local government	33%	$22,160
Nursing and residential care facilities	16%	$24,210
Religious, grantmaking, civic, and professional orgs.	12%	$20,310
Arts, entertainment, and recreation	10%	$19,320
Social assistance	8%	$22,640

== See also ==
- Hospitality management studies
- Sociology of leisure
- Digital leisure studies
