= Homo consumericus =

Neologism used in social sciences

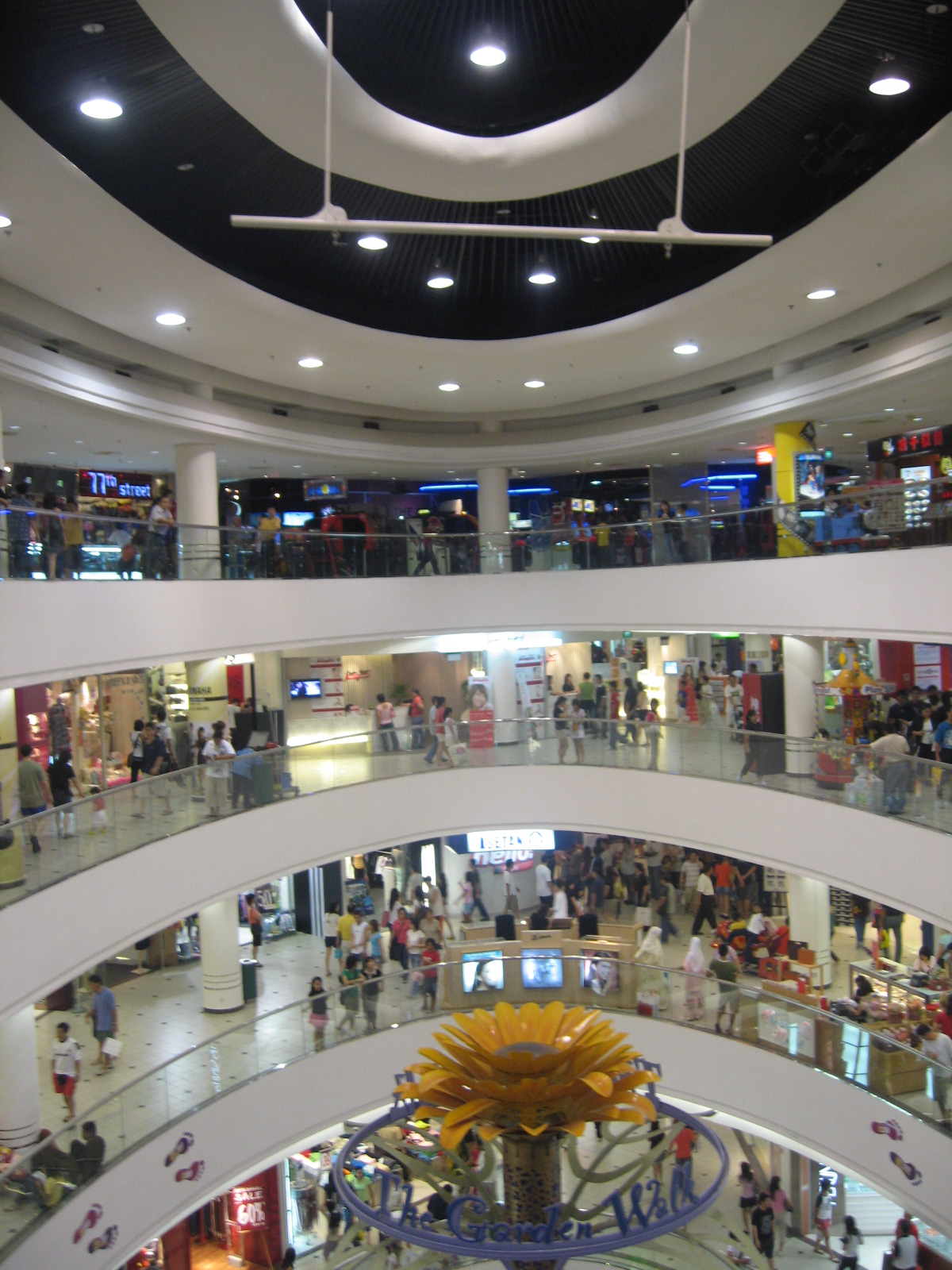
Modern malls have been described as new "cathedrals of consumption".

Homo consumericus (mock Latin for consumerist person) is a neologism used in social sciences, notably by Gilles Lipovetsky in Le Bonheur Paradoxal (2006) and Gad Saad in his 2007 book, The Evolutionary Bases of Consumption According to these and other scholars, the phenomenon of mass consumption can be compared to certain traits of human psychology described by evolutionary scientists pointing out similarities between Darwinian principles and consumer behavior. Lipovetsky has noted that modern times have brought about the rise of a "third" type of Homo consumericus, who is unpredictable and insatiable. A similar expression, Homo Consumens, was used by Erich Fromm in Socialist Humanism, written in 1965. Fromm wrote: "Homo consumens is the man whose main goal is not primarily to own things, but to consume more and more, and thus to compensate for his inner vacuity, passivity, loneliness, and anxiety." The expression Homo Consumens has been used by several other authors, including Mihailo Marković.

== See also ==
- Anti-consumerism
- Commodity fetishism
- Cultural studies
