= John Johnston (econometrician) =

British econometrician

- Born: 13 March 1923; Belfast, Northern Ireland
- Died: 14 October 2003 (aged 80); Irvine, California

Academic background
- Education: University of Wales; Queen's University Belfast

Academic work
- Discipline: Econometrics
- Institutions: University of California, Irvine; University of Manchester

John "Jack" Johnston (13 March 1923 – 14 October 2003) was a British econometrician. He spent most of his career at the University of Manchester, where he was the UK's first chair of econometrics (and he was later, 1967, given a named professorship - the "Stanley Jevons Professor") and later University of California, Irvine. Johnston is particularly known for authoring Econometric Methods (First edition 1964), one of the earliest and most popular textbooks in econometrics, the most recent editions being co-authored with John DiNardo.

Johnston died in 2003 at UC Irvine Medical Center from complications of Parkinson's disease.

== Seleceted works ==
- Johnston, J., (1955) Econometric Models and the Average Duration of Business Cycles, The Manchester School, Vol. XXIII, Sept., pp. 193–227.
- Johnston, J., (1958). A Statistical Illusion in Judging Keynesian Models: Comment. The Review of Economics and Statistics, 296-298.
- Johnston, J., (1960), Statistical Cost Analysis, McGraw-Hill, New York.
- Johnston, J., (1963), (And various other years) Econometric Methods, McGraw-Hill, New York. (And various other publishers).
