= Social consumerism =

== Introduction ==
Social Consumerism refers to business practices that are looking to align with consumer patterns that affect social outcomes. It occurs when the consumer's needs are met, the business achieves profitability and a social issue is positively affected. This is very different than traditional business models where only the first two objectives are achieved.

The value of social consumerism is that it takes the responsibility of the charitable donation away from the consumer and ties the philanthropic action to what consumers do naturally (e.g. eat out and part of the tab goes to a food charity.)

Some surveys suggest that as many as 92% of moms and 88% of millennials want to buy from organizations that support a good cause.

=== Postwar Consumer Citizenship ===
The expansion of consumer culture in the United States after World War II was closely tied to ideas of citizenship and democratic participation. Policymakers and business leaders promoted mass consumption as both a civic duty, and an economic producer. Purchasing goods were framed as a contribution to national prosperity and stability. This concept of consumption as a form of social responsibility ultimately helped engrain consumerism into the political and cultural structures of postwar America. Private spending was then linked to public welfare and a collective American identity.

== Gender and Consumer Culture ==
=== Women and the Development of Social Consumerism ===
Women played an important role in the emergence of social consumerism in the United States, particularly in the late nineteenth and twentieth centuries. Women were both targets of marketing campaigns and active participators in consumption. They helped define the social and political structures of consumerism. Domestic consumption was often linked to global ideals, with American households importing goods that symbolized cosmopolitan modernity and further reinforced national identity.

=== Department Stores ===
Department stores in the late nineteenth and early twentieth centuries played a central role in shaping early forms of social consumerism. These institutions not only provided women with access to a wide range of goods, but they also created new public spaces where consumption intersected with social life. Department stores also contributed to ideals of beauty, fashion, and modernity. While they further reinforced typical gendered expectations of the time, they also offered women a measure of independence in the marketplace.

=== Identity and Social Norms ===
The rise of modern culture after 1890 coincided with the feminization of consumption. Advertisements consistently portrayed women as the active purchaser within a household. This portrayal was mostly directed at middle class housewives. The portrayals reinforced gendered norms and assumptions that framed consumerism as feminine or as a domestic activity. At the same time, women also were able to actively shape the market place and were not passive recipients of the typical consumer messaging.

== Consumer Activism and Social Justice ==
=== Mobilization through Reform and Organization ===
Organizations such as the National Consumers League mobilized women to use their purchasing power for social good. They encouraged actions like boycotting and promoting labor standards. African American entrepreneurs such as Madam C.J. Walker and Annie Turnbo Malone fused beauty culture with racial uplift, training women as sales agents and community leaders. These efforts demonstrate how women's consumer practices could serve broader political and social goals. Similarly, alliances between groups such as the United Farm Workers and the Black Panther Party illustrate how consumer activism cut through with broader struggles for racial and economic justice. Consumer activism in these movements linked consumption to collective political mobilization.
