= Consumerism =

Acquisition of goods beyond essential needs

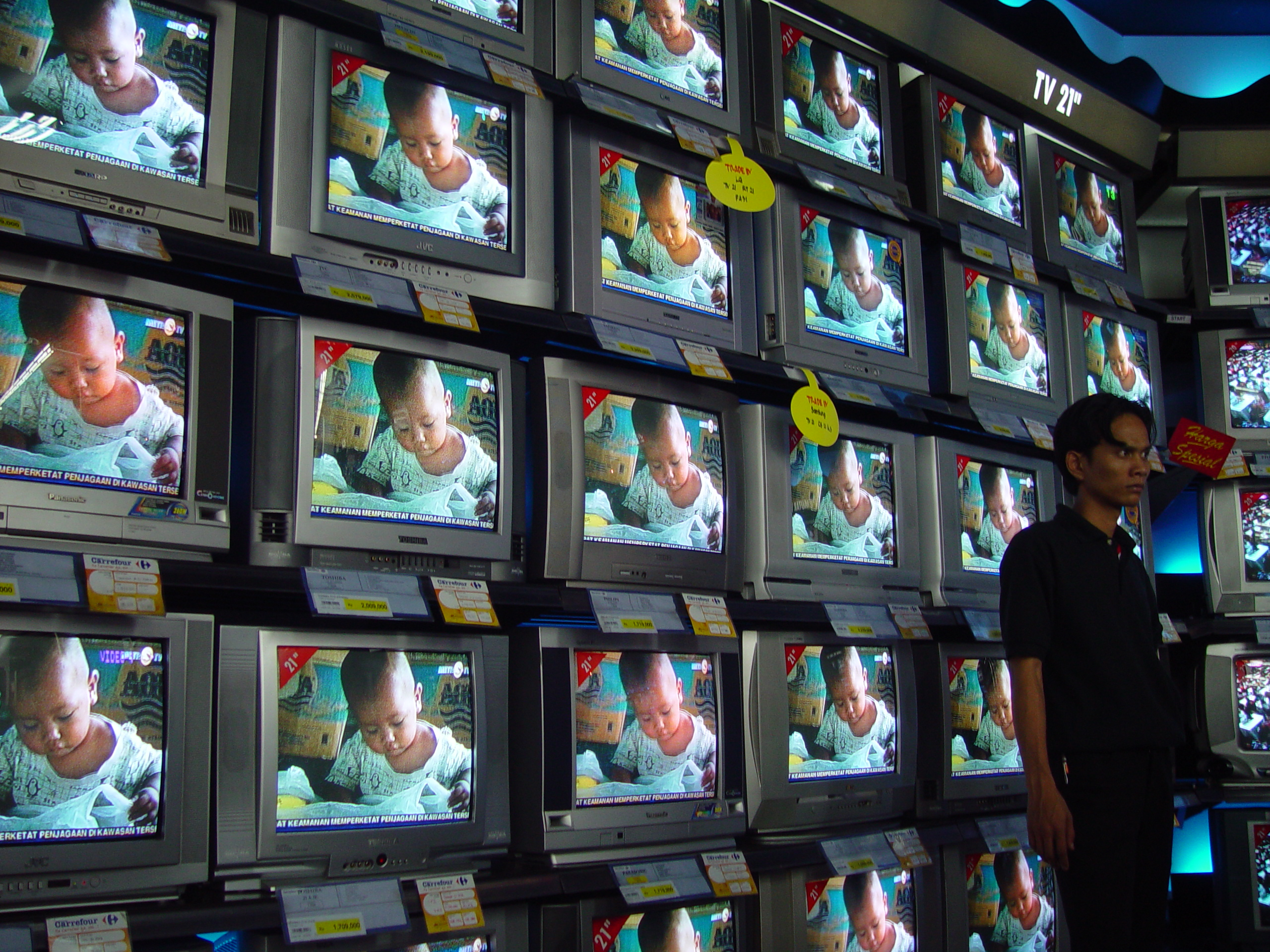
An electronics store displaying CRT TVs in a shopping mall in Jakarta, Indonesia (2002)

Consumerism is a socio-cultural and economic phenomenon in which the aspirations of many individuals include the acquisition of goods and services beyond those necessary for survival or traditional displays. In contemporary consumer society, the purchase and the consumption of products have evolved beyond the mere satisfaction of basic human needs, transforming into an activity that is not only economic but also cultural, social, and even identity-forming. It emerged in Western Europe and the United States during the Industrial Revolution and became widespread around the 20th century. In economics, consumerism refers to policies that emphasize consumption. It is the consideration that the free choice of consumers should strongly inform the choice by manufacturers of what is produced and how, and therefore influence the economic organization of a society.

Consumerism has been criticized by both individuals who choose other ways of participating in the economy (i.e. choosing simple living or slow living) and environmentalists concerned about its impact on the planet. Experts often assert that consumerism has physical limits, such as growth imperative and overconsumption, which have larger impacts on the environment. This includes direct effects like overexploitation of natural resources or large amounts of waste from disposable goods and significant effects like climate change. Similarly, some research and criticism focuses on the sociological effects of consumerism, such as reinforcement of class barriers and creation of inequalities.

== Evolution of the term ==
The term "consumerism" has several definitions. These definitions may not be related to each other and they conflict with each other.

In a 1955 speech, John Bugas, a vice president of the Ford Motor Company, coined the term "consumerism" as a substitute for "capitalism" and better describe the American economy:

The term consumerism would pin the tag where it actually belongs – on Mr. Consumer, the real boss and beneficiary of the American system. It would pull the rug right out from under our unfriendly critics who have blasted away so long and loud at capitalism.

Bugas' definition aligned with Austrian economics founder Carl Menger's conception of consumer sovereignty, as laid out in his 1871 book Principles of Economics, whereby consumer preferences, valuations, and choices control the economy entirely. This view stood in direct opposition to Karl Marx's critique of the capitalist economy as a system of exploitation.

For social critic Vance Packard, however, "consumerism" was not a positive term about consumer practices but rather a negative term, meaning excessive materialism and wastefulness. In the advertisements for his 1960 book The Waste Makers, the word "consumerism" was prominently featured in a negative way.

One sense of the term relates to efforts to support consumers' interests. By the early 1970s it had become the accepted term for the field and began to be used in these ways:

1. Consumerism is the concept that consumers should be informed decision makers in the marketplace. In this sense consumerism is the study and practice of matching consumers with trustworthy information, such as product testing reports.
2. Consumerism is the concept that the marketplace itself is responsible for ensuring social justice through fair economic practices. Consumer protection policies and laws compel manufacturers to make products safe.
3. Consumerism refers to the field of studying, regulating, or interacting with the marketplace. The consumer movement is the social movement which refers to all actions and all entities within the marketplace which give consideration to the consumer.

While the above definitions were becoming established, other people began using the term consumerism to mean "high levels of consumption". This definition has gained popularity since the 1970s and began to be used in these ways:

1. Consumerism is the selfish and frivolous collecting of products, or economic materialism. In this sense consumerism is negative and in opposition to positive lifestyles of anti-consumerism and simple living.
2. Consumerism is a force from the marketplace which destroys individuality and harms society. It is related to globalization and in protest against this some people promote the "anti-globalization movement".

== History ==
=== Origins ===
The consumer society developed throughout the late 17th century and the 18th century. Peck addresses the assertion made by consumption scholars about writers such as "Nicholas Barbon and Bernard Mandeville" in "Luxury and War: Reconsidering Luxury Consumption in Seventeenth-Century England" and how their emphasis on the financial worth of luxury changed society's perceptions of luxury. They argue that a significant transformation occurred in the eighteenth century when the focus shifted from court-centered luxury spending to consumer-driven luxury consumption, which was fueled by middle-class purchases of new products.

The English economy expanded significantly in the 17th century due to new methods of agriculture that rendered it feasible to cultivate a larger area. A time of heightened demand for luxury goods and increased cultural interaction was reflected in the wide range of luxury products that the aristocracy and affluent merchants imported from nations like Italy and the Low Countries. This expansion of luxury consumption in England was facilitated by state policies that encouraged cultural borrowing and import substitution, hence enabling the purchase of luxury items. Luxury goods included sugar, tobacco, tea, and coffee; these were increasingly grown on vast plantations (historically by slave labor) in the Caribbean as demand steadily rose. In particular, sugar consumption in Britain increased by a factor of 20 during the 18th century.

Furthermore, the non-importation movement commenced in the 18th century, more precisely from 1764 to 1776, as Witkowski's article "Colonial Consumers in Revolt: Buyer Values and Behavior during the Nonimportation Movement, 1764–1776" discusses. He describes the evolving development of consumer culture in the context of "colonial America". An emphasis on efficiency and economical consumption gave way to a preference for comfort, convenience, and importing products. During this time of transformation, colonial consumers had to choose between rising material desires and conventional values.

=== Culture of consumption ===
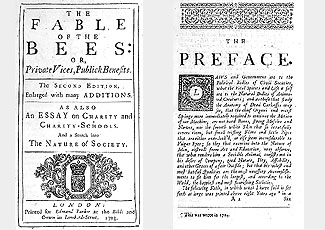
Bernard Mandeville's work Fable of the Bees, which justified conspicuous consumption.

The pattern of intensified consumption became particularly visible in the 17th century in London, where the gentry and prosperous merchants took up residence and promoted a culture of luxury and consumption that slowly extended across socio-economic boundaries. Marketplaces expanded as shopping centres, such as the New Exchange, opened in 1609 by Robert Cecil in the Strand. Shops started to become important as places for Londoners to meet and socialize and became popular destinations alongside the theatre. From 1660, Restoration London also saw the growth of luxury buildings as advertisements for social position, with speculative architects like Nicholas Barbon and Lionel Cranfield operating. This then-scandalous line of thought caused great controversy with the publication of the influential work Fable of the Bees in 1714, in which Bernard Mandeville argued that a country's prosperity ultimately lay in the self-interest of the consumer.

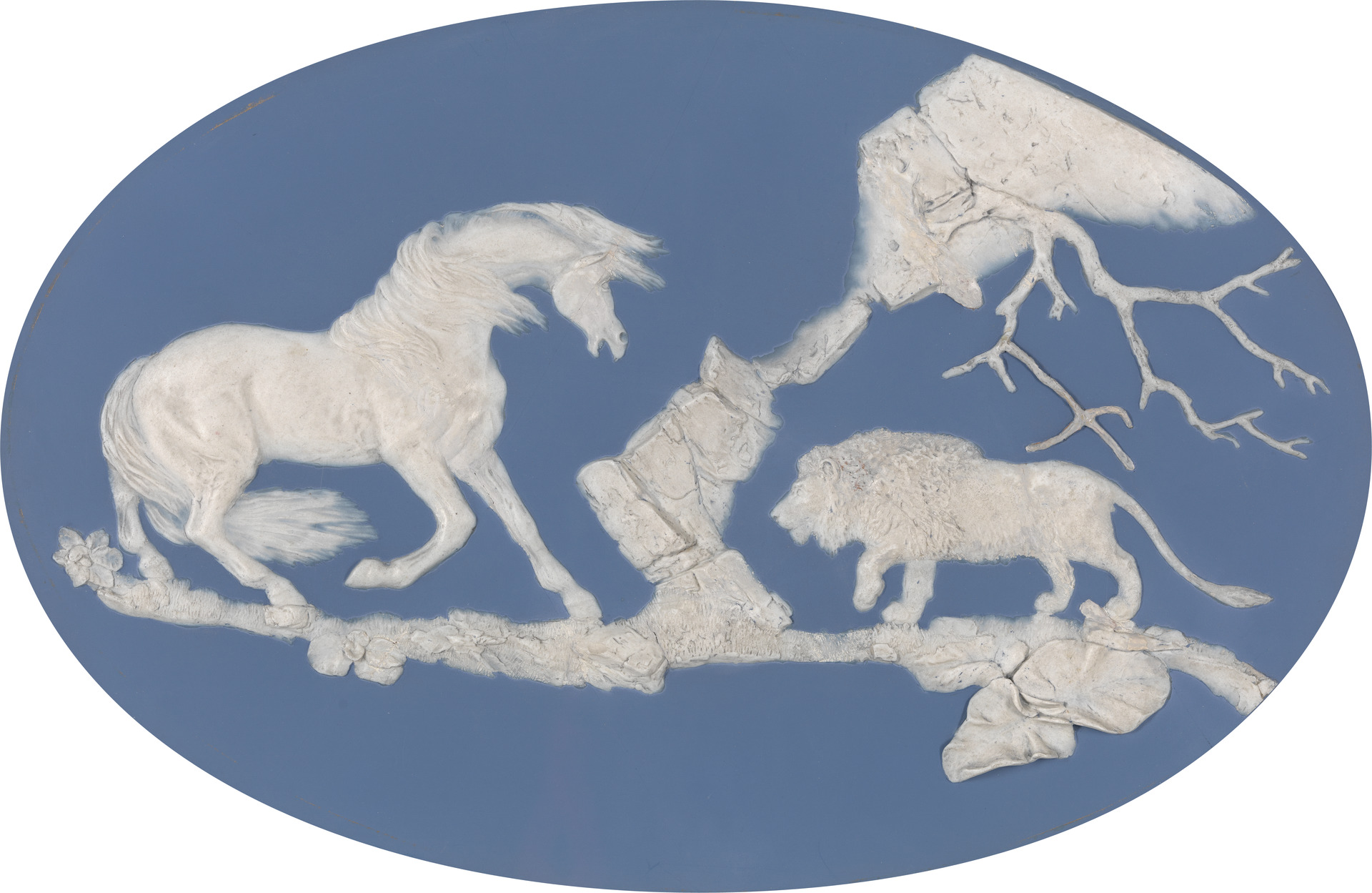
Josiah Wedgwood's pottery, a status symbol of consumerism in the late 18th century.

The pottery entrepreneur and inventor, Josiah Wedgwood, noticed the way that aristocratic fashions, themselves subject to periodic changes in direction, slowly filtered down through different classes of society. He pioneered the use of marketing techniques to influence and manipulate the movement of prevailing tastes and preferences to cause the aristocracy to accept his goods; it was only a matter of time before the middle classes also rapidly bought up his goods. Other producers of a wide range of other products followed his example, and the spread and importance of consumption fashions became steadily more important. Since then, advertising has played a major role in fostering a consumerist society, marketing goods through various platforms in nearly all aspects of human life, and pushing the message that the potential customer's personal life requires some product.

=== Mass production ===
The Industrial Revolution dramatically increased the availability of consumer goods, although it was still primarily focused on the capital goods sector and industrial infrastructure (i.e., mining, steel, oil, transportation networks, communications networks, industrial cities, financial centers, etc.). The advent of the department store represented a paradigm shift in the experience of shopping. Customers could now buy an astonishing variety of goods, all in one place, and shopping became a popular leisure activity. While previously the norm had been the scarcity of resources, the industrial era created an unprecedented economic situation. For the first time in history products were available in outstanding quantities, at outstandingly low prices, therefore available to virtually everyone in the industrialized West.

By the turn of the 20th century, the average worker in Western Europe or the United States still spent approximately 80–90% of their income on food and other necessities. What was needed to propel consumerism, was a system of mass production and consumption, exemplified by Henry Ford, an American car manufacturer. After observing the assembly lines in the meat-packing industry, Frederick Winslow Taylor brought his theory of scientific management to the organization of the assembly line in other industries; this unleashed incredible productivity and reduced the costs of commodities produced on assembly lines around the world.

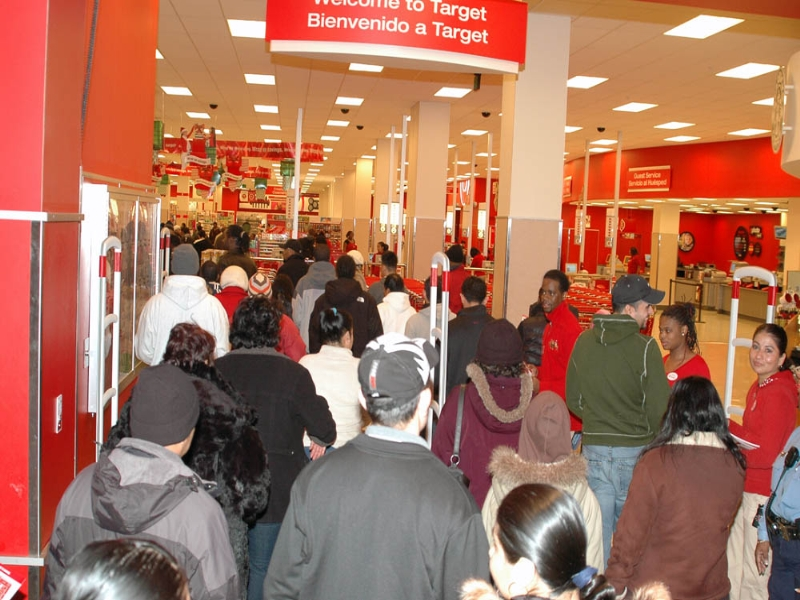
Black Friday shoppers, DC USA.

Consumerism has long had intentional underpinnings, rather than just developing out of capitalism. As an example, Earnest Elmo Calkins noted to fellow advertising executives in 1932 that "consumer engineering must see to it that we use up the kind of goods we now merely use", while the domestic theorist Christine Frederick observed in 1929 that "the way to break the vicious deadlock of a low standard of living is to spend freely, and even waste creatively".

The older term and concept of "conspicuous consumption" originated at the turn of the 20th century in the writings of sociologist and economist Thorstein Veblen. The term describes an apparently irrational and confounding form of economic behaviour. Veblen's scathing proposal that this unnecessary consumption is a form of status display is made in darkly humorous observations like the following:

It is true of dress in even a higher degree than of most other items of consumption, that people will undergo a very considerable degree of privation in the comforts or the necessaries of life to afford what is considered a decent amount of wasteful consumption; so that it is by no means an uncommon occurrence, in an inclement climate, for people to go ill clad to appear well dressed.

The term "conspicuous consumption" spread to describe consumerism in the United States in the 1960s, but was soon linked to debates about media theory, culture jamming, and its corollary productivism.

By 1920 most Americans had experimented with occasional installment buying.

=== Television and American consumerism ===
The advent of the television in the late 1940s proved to be an attractive opportunity for advertisers, who could reach potential consumers in the home using lifelike images and sound. The introduction of mass commercial television positively impacted retail sales. The television motivated consumers to purchase more products and upgrade whatever they currently had. In the United States, a new consumer culture developed centered around buying products, especially automobiles and other durable goods, to increase their social status. Woojin Kim of the University of California, Berkeley, argues that sitcoms of this era also helped to promote the idea of suburbia.

According to Kim, the attraction of television advertising has brought an improvement in Americans' social status. Watching television programs has become an important part of people's cultural life. Television advertising can enrich and change the content of advertising from hearing and vision and make people in contact with it. The image of television advertising is realistic, and it is easy to have an interest and desire to buy advertising goods, At the same time, the audience intentionally or unintentionally compares and comments on the advertised goods while appreciating the TV advertisements, arouses the interest of the audience by attracting attention, and forms a buying idea, which is conducive to enhancing the buying confidence. Therefore, TV can be used as a media way to accelerate and affect people's desire to buy products.

=== In the 21st century ===
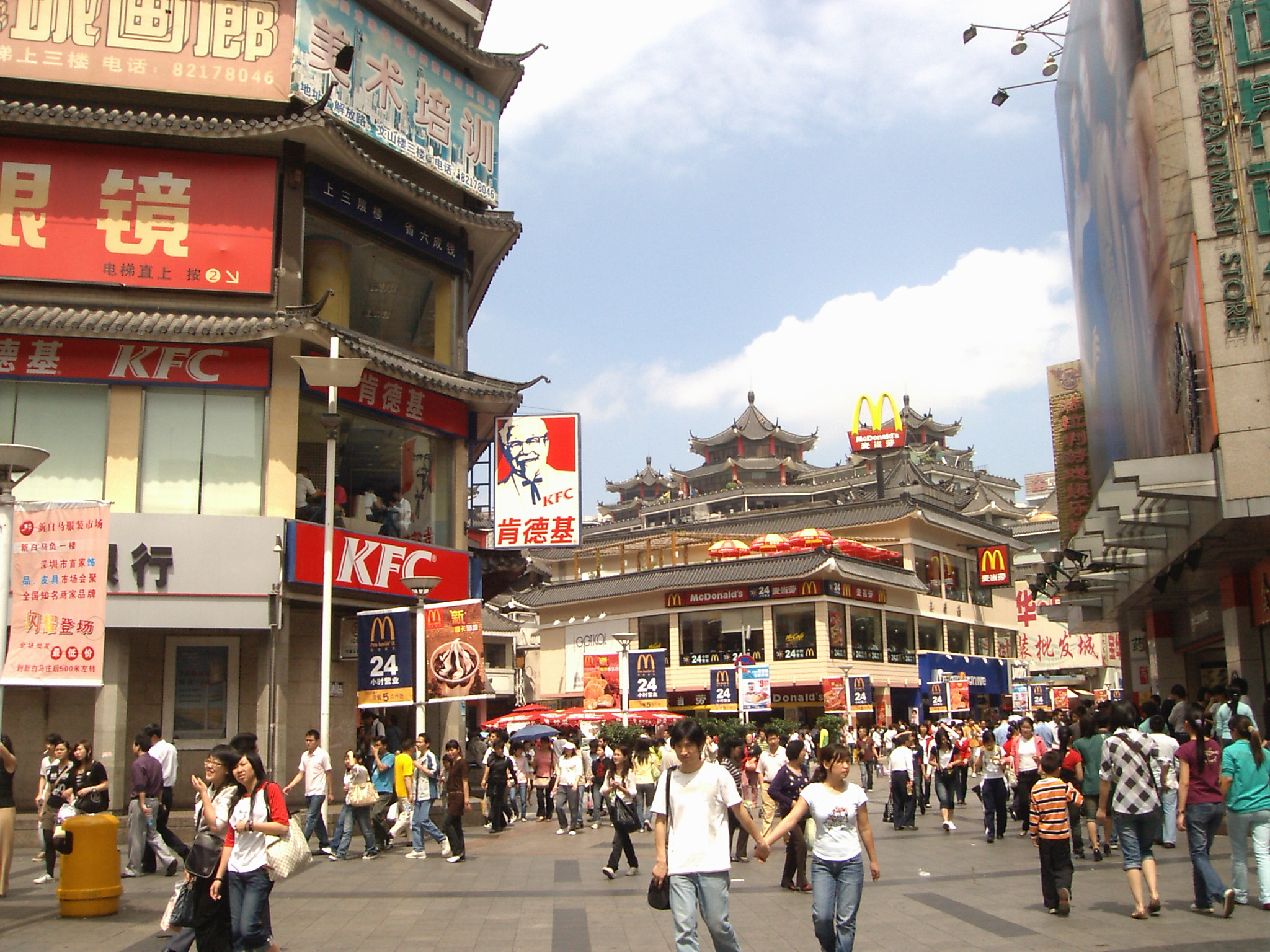
McDonald's and KFC restaurants in China.

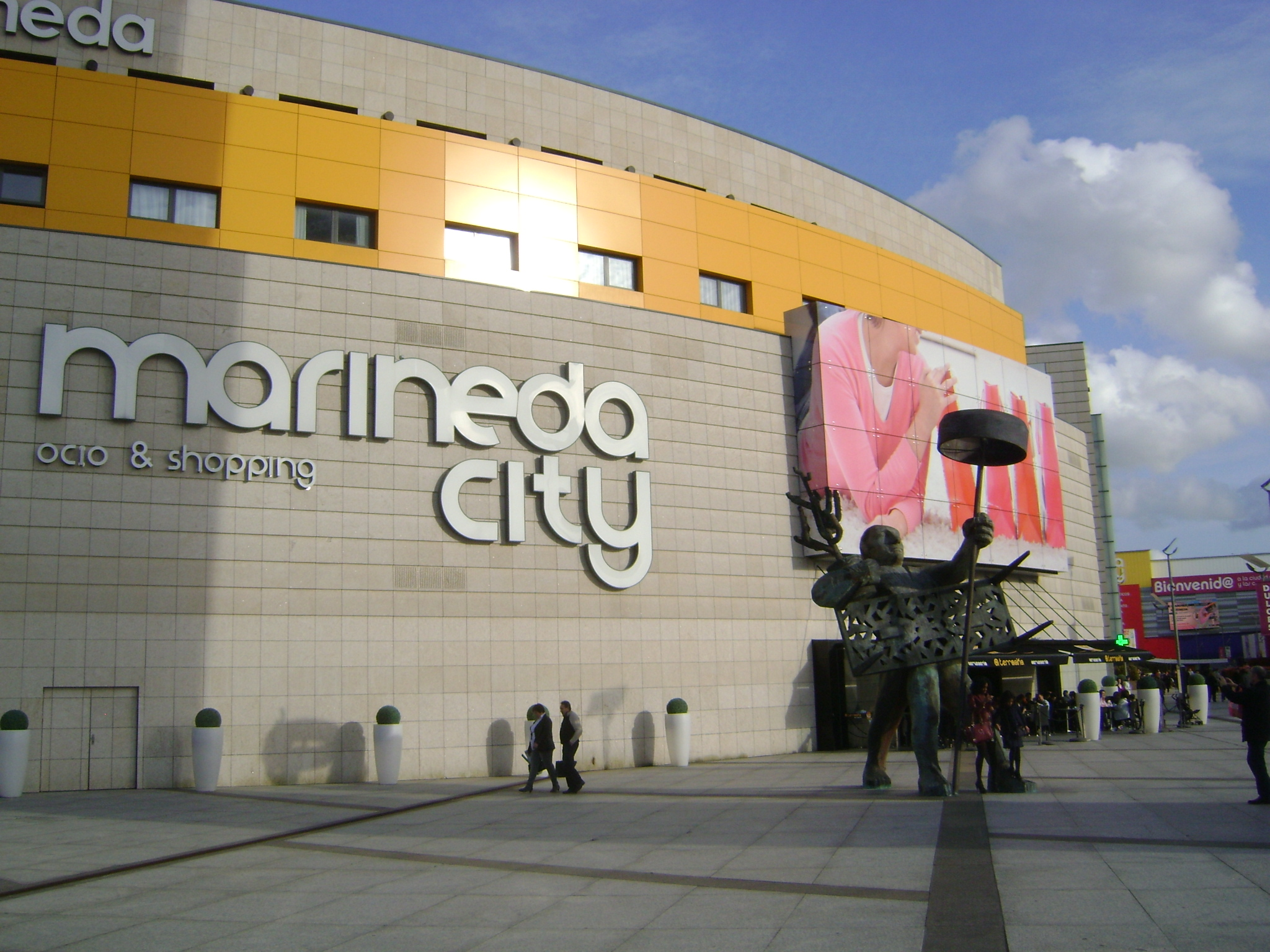
Shopping mall in A Coruña, Galicia, (Spain).

Madeline Levine criticized what she saw as a large change in American culture – "a shift away from values of community, spirituality, and integrity, and toward competition, materialism and disconnection."

Due to businesses targeting marketing towards wealthy consumers, their tastes, lifestyles, and preferences trickle down to standards for all consumers. Less wealthy consumers can "purchase something new that will speak of their place in the tradition of affluence".

Emulation is also a core component of 21st century consumerism. As a general trend, regular consumers seek to emulate those who are above them in the social hierarchy. The poor strive to imitate the wealthy and the wealthy imitate celebrities and other icons. The celebrity endorsement of products can be seen as evidence of the desire of modern consumers to purchase products partly or solely to emulate people of higher social status. This purchasing behavior may co-exist in the mind of a consumer with an image of oneself as being an individualist.

Cultural capital, the intangible social value of goods, is not solely generated by cultural pollution. Subcultures also manipulate the value and prevalence of certain commodities through the process of bricolage. Bricolage is the process by which mainstream products are adopted and transformed by subcultures. These items develop a function and meaning that differs from their corporate producer's intent. In many cases, commodities that have undergone bricolage often develop political meanings.

For example, Doc Martens, originally marketed as workers boots, gained popularity with the punk movement and AIDS activism groups and became symbols of an individual's place in that social group. When corporate America recognized the growing popularity of the brand, it underwent another change in cultural meaning through counter-bricolage. The widespread sale and marketing of Doc Martens brought them back into the mainstream. While corporate America reaped the ever-growing profits of the increasingly expensive boot and those modeled after its style, Doc Martens lost their original political association. Consumers used Doc Martens and related items to create an "individualized" sense of identity by appropriating statement items from subcultures they admired.

Authors Steven Quartz and Anette Asp make a similar argument that changing notions of "cool" affect consumption patterns. Items that cost less, and would normally be lower in social status according to the old rules of conspicuous consumption, can actually rise in status if they are associated with a cool, rebellious subculture. As examples, the authors cite leather jackets popularized in 1950s motorcycle movies, or the cachet of "distressed clothing", or the tech entrepreneur who chooses to wear a T-shirt and hoodie instead of an elegant suit. Quartz and Asp have labeled this trend "rebellious consumption", and assert that it has altered advertising, consumer behavior, and even has political implications since less-well-off people can feel content with their inexpensive but "cool" possessions.

In recent decades, consumerism has evolved into an organized movement to enhance the power and rights of buyers in relation to sellers. Consumer advocates believe that sellers enjoy an advantage in the traditional balance of power, for instance, the right to introduce any product in any size or style, the right to change a product's price at any time, the right to spend any amount to promote a product, and the right to use any message to encourage product purchases. Besides a buyer's principal right, i.e., not to buy, advocates have lobbied for expanded, enforceable buyer rights such as the right to be well informed about important aspects of a product, and the right to be protected against questionable products and marketing practices.

The American Dream has long been associated with consumerism. According to Sierra Club's Dave Tilford, "With less than 5 percent of world population, the U.S. uses one-third of the world's paper, a quarter of the world's oil, 23 percent of the coal, 27 percent of the aluminum, and 19 percent of the copper."

China is the world's fastest-growing consumer market. According to biologist Paul R. Ehrlich, "If everyone consumed resources at the US level, you will need another four or five Earths."

With the development of the economy, consumers' awareness of protecting their rights and interests is growing, and consumer demand is growing. Online commerce has expanded the consumer market and enhanced consumer information and market transparency. Digital fields not only bring advantages and convenience but also cause many problems and increase the opportunities for consumers to suffer damage.

Under the virtual network environment, on the one hand, consumers' privacy protection is vulnerable to infringement, driven by the development of hacker technology and the Internet, on the other hand, consumers' right to know is the basic right of consumers. When purchasing goods and receiving services, we need the real situation of institutional services. Finally, in the Internet era, consumers' demand is increasing, and we also need to protect consumers' rights and interests to improve consumers' rights and interests and promote the operation of the economic market.

==== Socially mediated political consumerism ====
Today's society has entered the era of entertainment and the Internet. Most people spend more time browsing on mobile phones than face-to-face. The convenience of social media has a subtle impact on the public and unconsciously changes people's consumption habits. The socialized Internet is gradually developing, such as Twitter, websites, news and social media, with sharing and participation as the core, consumers share product information and opinions through social media. At the same time, by understanding the reputation of the brand on social media, consumers can easily change their original attitude towards the brand. The information provided by social media helps consumers shorten the time of thinking about products and decision-making, so as to improve consumers' initiative in purchase decision-making and improve consumers' shopping and decision-making quality to a certain extent.

== Criticism ==
A major criticism of consumerism is that it serves the interests of capitalism.

Consumerism can take extreme forms, to the extent that consumers will sacrifice significant time and income not only to make purchases, but also to actively support a certain firm or brand. As stated by Gary Cross in his book An All-Consuming Century: Why Commercialism Won in Modern America, "consumerism succeeded where other ideologies failed because it concretely expressed the cardinal political ideals of the century – liberty and democracy – and with relatively little self-destructive behavior or personal humiliation." He discusses how consumerism won in its forms of expression.

Tim Kasser, in his book The High Price of Materialism, examines how the culture of consumerism and materialism affects our happiness and well-being. The book argues that people who value wealth and possessions more than other things tend to have lower levels of satisfaction, self-esteem, and intimacy, and higher levels of anxiety, depression, and insecurity. The book also explores how materialistic values harm our relationships, our communities, and our environment, and suggests ways to reduce materialism and increase our quality of life.

Opponents of consumerism argue that many luxuries and unnecessary consumer-products may act as a social mechanism allowing people to identify like-minded individuals through the display of similar products, again utilizing aspects of status-symbolism to judge socioeconomic status and social stratification. Some people believe relationships with a product or brand name are substitutes for healthy human relationships lacking in societies, and along with consumerism, create a cultural hegemony, and are part of a general process of social control in modern society.

In 1955, economist Victor Lebow stated:

Our enormously productive economy demands that we make consumption our way of life, that we convert the buying and use of goods into rituals, that we seek our spiritual satisfaction and our ego satisfaction in consumption. We need things consumed, burned up, worn out, replaced and discarded at an ever-increasing rate.

Figures who arguably do not wholly buy into consumerism include German historian Oswald Spengler (1880–1936), who said: "Life in America is exclusively economic in structure and lacks depth", and French writer Georges Duhamel (1884–1966), who held American materialism up as "a beacon of mediocrity that threatened to eclipse French civilization". Francis Fukuyama blames consumerism for moral compromises.

Moreover, some critics have expressed concern about the role commodities play in the definition of one's self. In his 1976 book Captains of Consciousness: Advertising and the Social Roots of the Consumer Culture, historian and media theorist Stuart Ewen introduced what he referred to as the "commodification of consciousness", and coined the term "commodity self" to describe an identity built by the goods we consume.

For example, people often identify as PC or Mac users, or define themselves as a Coke drinker rather than a Pepsi drinker. The ability to choose one product out of a great number of others allows a person to build a sense of "unique" individuality, despite the prevalence of Mac users or the nearly identical tastes of Coke and Pepsi. By owning a product from a certain brand, one's ownership becomes a vehicle of presenting an identity that is associated with the attitude of the brand. The idea of individual choice is exploited by corporations that claim to sell "uniqueness" and the building blocks of an identity. The invention of the commodity self is a driving force of consumerist societies, preying upon the deep human need to build a sense of self.

=== Austrian economics ===
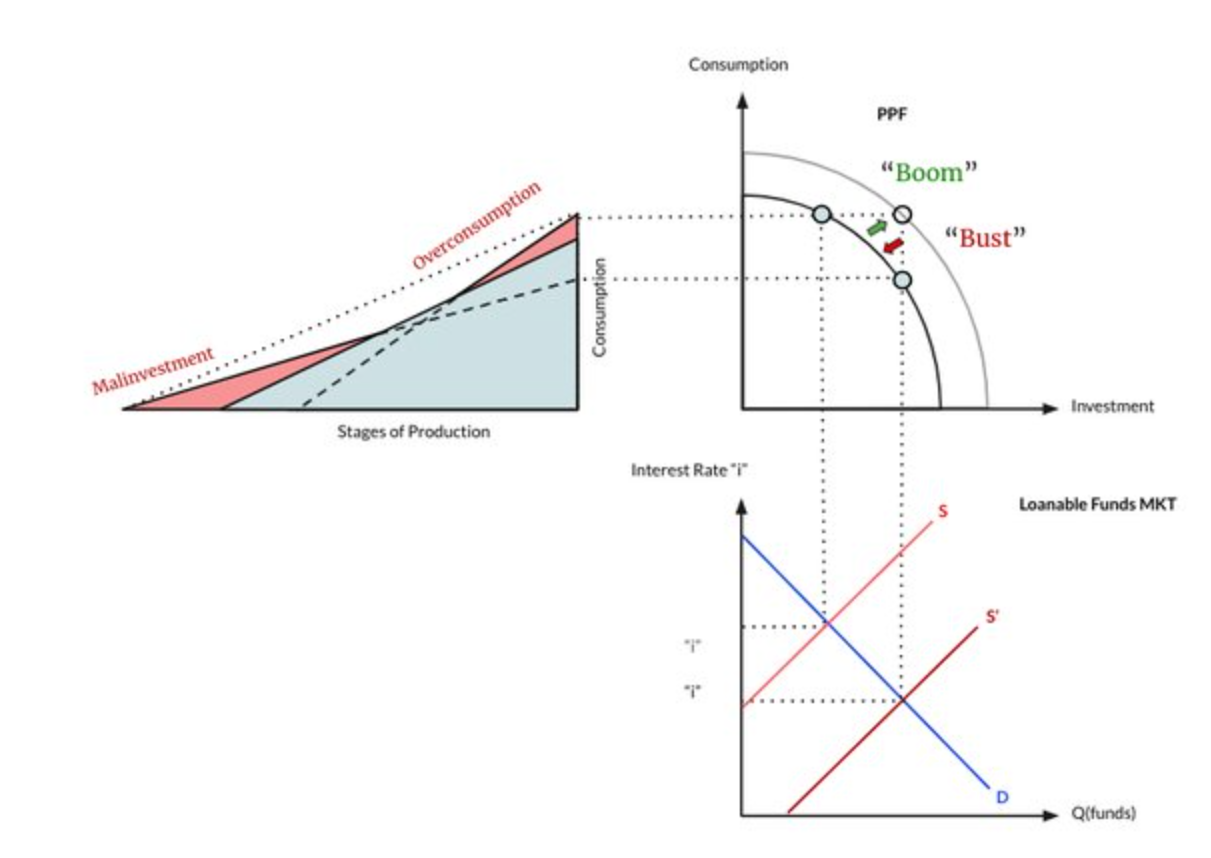
Austrian business cycle theory, formulated by Friedrich Hayek, before and during the Great Depression

Austrian economic advocates focus on the entrepreneur, promoting a productive lifestyle rather than a materialistic one wherein the individual is defined by things and not their self. Austrian economists claim Keynesian notions of incentivizing increased consumption, which claims to mitigate recessive impacts when the populace reduces spending, as counterintuitive and contributing to the business cycle of booms and busts. They oppose the adjustments of interest rates to incentivize consumerism.

Furthermore, Austrians emphasize a nation is unable to obtain wealth via consumption, which inevitably translates to entire resource absorption. Production is therefore what grants consumption as a possibility to begin with, given that a producer would not be working towards revenue, if not one's consumptive desires in their own expenditure discretion. Moreover, the Austrian School argues that the subjective value of goods and services motivate the demand for these commodities in order for their prices to be influenced by consumers.

=== Environmental impact ===
Critics of consumerism point out that consumerist societies are more prone to damage the environment, contribute to global warming and use resources at a higher rate than other societies.

Pope Francis also critiqued consumerism in his encyclical Laudato Si': On Care For Our Common Home. He critiqued the harm consumerism does to the environment and states, "The analysis of environmental problems cannot be separated from the analysis of human, family, work-related and urban contexts, nor from how individuals relate to themselves, which leads in turn to how they relate to others and to the environment." Pope Francis believed the obsession with consumerism leads individuals further away from their humanity and obscures the interrelated nature between humans and the environment.

Another critic is James Gustave Speth. He argues that the growth imperative represents the main goal of capitalistic consumerism. In his book The Bridge at the Edge of the World he notes, "Basically, the economic system does not work when it comes to protecting environmental resources, and the political system does not work when it comes to correcting the economic system".

In an opinion segment of New Scientist magazine published in August 2009, reporter Andy Coghlan cited William Rees of the University of British Columbia and epidemiologist Warren Hern of the University of Colorado at Boulder saying that human beings, despite considering themselves civilized thinkers, are "subconsciously still driven by an impulse for survival, domination and expansion ... an impulse which now finds expression in the idea that inexorable economic growth is the answer to everything, and, given time, will redress all the world's existing inequalities."

According to figures presented by Rees at the annual meeting of the Ecological Society of America, human society is in a "global overshoot", consuming 30% more material than is sustainable from the world's resources. Rees went on to state that at present, 85 countries are exceeding their domestic "bio-capacities", and compensate for their lack of local material by depleting the stocks of other countries, which have a material surplus due to their lower consumption. Not only that, but McCraken indicates that how consumer goods and services are bought, created and used should be taken under consideration when studying consumption.

Not all anti-consumerists oppose consumption in itself, but they argue against increasing the consumption of resources beyond what is environmentally sustainable. Jonathan Porritt writes that consumers are often unaware of the negative environmental impacts of producing many modern goods and services, and that the extensive advertising industry only serves to reinforce increasing consumption.

Conservation scientists Lian Pin Koh and Tien Ming Lee, discuss that in the 21st century, the damage to forests and biodiversity cannot be dealt with only by the shift towards "Green" initiatives such as "sustainable production, green consumerism, and improved production practices". They argue that consumption in developing and emerging countries needs to be less excessive. Likewise, other ecological economists such as Herman Daly and Tim Jackson recognize the inherent conflict between consumer-driven consumption and planet-wide ecological degradation.

A 2020 review by Thomas Wiedman also concludes that the exponential growth in affluence and well-being of the population has significant increased resource use, pollutant emissions, and environmental degradation far more than these have been reduced through progress in technology aimed at sustainability. In fact, most studies agree that the "major drivers of global impacts are technological change and per-capita consumption". The authors thus argue that progress towards sustainability can only be made if technological developments are accompanied by societal and lifestyle changes.

American environmental historian and sociologist Jason W. Moore, in his book Anthropocene or Capitalocene? Nature, History, and the Crisis of Capitalism points out that the challenge of addressing both underconsumption and overconsumption of resources lies at the heart of the world's primary sustainability dilemma. While significant portions of the global population struggle to meet basic needs, the resource-intensive lifestyles of affluent societies – characterized by car dependency, frequent air travel, high meat consumption, and an apparently limitless appetite for consumer goods like clothing and technological devices – are key drivers of the unsustainable practices.

=== Consumerism as cultural ideology ===
In the 21st century's globalized economy, consumerism has become a noticeable part of the culture. Critics of this phenomenon have not only raised concerns about its environmental sustainability, but also its cultural implications. However, a number of scholars have explored the relationship between environmentalism and consumerism within the context of a market economy society.

Discussions of the environmental implications of consumerist ideologies appear in works by economists James Gustave Speth and Naomi Klein, and consumer cultural historian Gary Cross. Leslie Sklair proposes the criticism through the idea of culture-ideology of consumerism in his works. He says that,

First, capitalism entered a qualitatively new globalizing phase in the 1950s. As the electronic revolution got underway, significant changes began to occur in the productivity of capitalist factories, systems of extraction, processing of raw materials, product design, marketing and distribution of goods and services. [...] Second, the technical and social relations that structured the mass media all over the world made it very easy for new consumerist lifestyles to become the dominant motif for these media, which became in time extraordinarily efficient vehicles for the broadcasting of the culture-ideology of consumerism globally.

Today, people are universally and continuously being exposed to mass consumerism and product placement in the media or even in their daily lives. The line between information, entertainment, and promotion of products has been blurred, thus explaining how people have become more reformulated into consumerist behaviours. Shopping centers are a representative example of a place where people are explicitly exposed to an environment that welcomes and encourages consumption.

For example, in 1993, Goss wrote that the shopping center designers "strive to present an alternative rationale for the shopping center's existence, manipulate shoppers' behavior through the configuration of space, and consciously design a symbolic landscape that provokes associative moods and dispositions in the shopper". On the prevalence of consumerism in daily life, historian Gary Cross says that "The endless variation of clothing, travel, and entertainment provided opportunity for practically everyone to find a personal niche, no matter their race, age, gender or class."

The proliferation of consumerist cultural ideology can be witnessed all across the world. People who rush to the mall to buy products and end up spending money with their credit cards are liable to become entrenched in the financial system of capitalist globalization.

=== Alternatives ===
Since consumerism began, various individuals and groups have consciously sought an alternative lifestyle. These movements range on a spectrum from moderate "simple living", "eco-conscious shopping", and "localvore"/"buying local", to Freeganism on the extreme end. Building on these movements, the discipline of ecological economics addresses the macro-economic, social and ecological implications of a primarily consumer-driven economy.

== See also ==
- American Psycho – 1991 novel by Bret Easton Ellis
- Anthropological theories of value – Field of study
- Bourgeois personality – Social class
- Commercialism
- Commodity fetishism – Concept in Marxist analysis
- Consumer Bill of Rights – Guidelines for consumer protection
- Consumer capitalism – Condition in which consumer demand is manipulated through mass-marketing
- Consumer culture – Acquisition of goods beyond essential needs
- Consumer ethnocentrism – Psychological concept of consumer behaviour
- Consumer movement – Social movement to promote consumer protection
- Consumtariat – Global upper-class that bases its power on a technological advantage
- Corporatocracy – Society controlled by business corporations
- Cost the limit of price – Version of the labor theory of value
- Dawn of the Dead – 1978 film by George A. Romero
- Economic materialism – Excessive desire to acquire and consume material goods
- Fight Club – 1996 novel by Chuck Palahniuk
- Geoffrey Miller – American evolutionary psychologist (born 1965)
- Greed – Insatiable longing for material or immaterial gain
- Homo consumericus – Neologism used in social sciences
- Horace Kallen – American philosopher (1882–1974)
- Hyperconsumerism – Consumption of goods beyond ones necessities
- Hypermobility (travel) – Act of taking frequent trips
- Idiocracy – 2006 film by Mike Judge
- "Keeping up with the Joneses" – Idiom on comparing oneself to neighbors
- Keynesianism – Group of macroeconomic theories
- Moonlight clan – People who expend their entire salary before the end of each month
- One-Dimensional Man – 1964 book by Herbert Marcuse
- Overconsumption – Resource use exceeding carrying capacity
- Participatory culture – Cultural production made through social interactions of different communities and groups
- Philosophy of futility
- Planetary boundaries – Limits to safe impact on the Earth ecology
- Planned obsolescence – Product design with limited useful life
- Post-materialism – Concept in sociology
- Productivism – Primacy of productivity and growth
- Prosumer – Person who consumes and produces a product
- Sharing economy – Economic and social systems that enable shared access to assets
- Shopping addiction – Obsession with shopping and buying behavior
- Steady state economy – Constant capital and population size
- Supermarket – Large format of grocery store
- Surplus economics
- The Century of the Self – 2002 British documentary series
- The Joneses – 2009 American film directed by Derrick Borte
- They Live – 1988 film by John Carpenter
- The Paradox of Choice: Why More Is Less – 2004 book by Barry Schwartz
