= Netnography =

Type of qualitative social media research

Netnography is a "form of qualitative research that seeks to understand the cultural experiences that encompass and are reflected within the traces, practices, networks and systems of social media".

The term is a portmanteau combining "Internet" or "network" with "ethnography". Netnography was originally developed in 1995 by marketing professor Robert Kozinets (now USC Annenberg) as a tool to analyze online fan discussions about the Star Trek franchise. The use of the method spread from marketing research and consumer research to a range of other disciplines, including education, library and information sciences, hospitality, tourism, computer science, psychology, sociology, anthropology, geography, urban studies, leisure and game studies, and human sexuality and addiction research.

It is a specific set of research practices related to data collection, analysis, research ethics, and representation, rooted in participant observation that can be conceptualized into three key stages: investigation, interaction, and immersion. A significant amount of the data originates in and manifests through the digital traces of naturally occurring public conversations recorded by contemporary communications networks. Netnography uses these conversations as data. It is an interpretive research method that adapts the traditional, in-person participant observation techniques of anthropology to the study of interactions and experiences manifesting through digital communications (Kozinets 1998).

== Netnography and ethnography ==
Though netnography is developed from ethnography and applied in the online settings, it is more than the application of qualitative research in the form of traditional ethnographic techniques in an online context. There are several characters that differentiate netnography from ethnography.

1. Research focus. Netnographic research is more focused on reflections and data provided by online communities, whereas ethnography can focus on the entire human society.
2. Communication focus. Ethnography comprises research into all forms of human communication, including body language and tone of voice. Netnography incorporates human online communication, which is textual communication, or some multimedia communication such as video, audio, pictures.
3. Research method. Netnography offers a less intrusive research experience than ethnography, because netnography uses mainly observational data. Netnography is more naturalistic than personal interviews, focus groups, surveys, and experiments, whose data quality are largely influenced by the researcher. In addition, participants may alter their reactions/answers when involving in the interviews, focus group and surveys. The main advantage of netnography is that individuals reveal information, including sensitive details, unasked and voluntarily online naturally, and the netnographer could gain this organic information through observation.
4. Data collection. Compared with traditional ethnography which requires researchers physically immerse into the samples to collect data, netnographic researchers are able to download communication data directly from an online community. Netnographic researchers do not become members of communities and cultures as in traditional ethnographic practice, but are instead engaged in various and flexible levels of committed and public online social interaction, thus immerse oneself in the community. Thus ethnography usually collects real-life observation and primary data, and netnography usually collects computer-based and secondary data
5. Efficiency. Netnography tends to be less costly and timelier than many other methods because it leverages online archives and existing technologies to rapidly and efficiently gather and sort relevant data. Netnographic research is faster and cheaper in comparison with ethnographic research.
6. Number of participants. Netnography enables the researcher to investigate a large number of people, even more than when using ethnography.
7. Retroactivity. Netnography could trace back conversations several years ago so that allow researchers understand the history or the development of a topic/community, but ethnography can only study the current situation.

Netnography is also similar to ethnography in these ways:

1. It is naturalistic: it seeks to study online social interaction by participating within and observing it;
2. It is immersive: it involves the researcher as the key element in data collection and creation;
3. It is descriptive: it seeks rich contextual portrayals of the lived experience of online social life;
4. It is multi-method: it can involve a range of other methods, such as interviews, semiotic visual analysis, and data science; and
5. It is adaptable: it can be used to study many types of online sites and technology-related communications and interaction

== Keys components ==
Key components of netnography include emotion/story, the researcher, key source person, and cultural fluency.

=== Emotion and story ===
Netnography combines rich samples of communicative and interactions flowing through the internet: textual, graphic, audio, photographic and audio-visual. The data then will be analysed using content analysis, semiotic visual analysis, interviews (online and in person), social network analysis and the use of big data analytic tools and techniques. These techniques are employed to find the emotional story behind a subject.

This what differentiate netnography to big-data analysis that often relies on machine (sentiment analysis, word cloud) and also to digital ethnography or digital anthropology. These terms (netnography, digital ethnography, and digital anthropology) are often used interchangeably, but they are very different.

The difference between netnography and digital ethnography could be seen in several ways, including the research motivation and methodology determined by the purpose. Netnography focuses on internet users forming an online community which is highlighted from the substantial daily life, while digital ethnography only treat the digital world as a place to extend their offline data collection to complement the ethnographic research. The methodological framework between them are not typically different, since netnography mainly use online qualitative techniques and use online quantitative research as a supplement occasionally, while digital ethnography combines both quantitative (e.g., network and co-word analysis) and qualitative (e.g., sentiment and content analysis) techniques.

To find the emotional story, big data analysis is often used as a complementary technique, usually at the beginning of the research. However, instead of scooping a huge amount of data and relying on machine to analyse it, the strength of netnography is contextualized data, human-centered analysis, and resonant representation.

In the Journal of Marketing Management, Emma Reid and Katherine Duffy proposed a framework they termed "netnographic sensibility", using Pulsar as a case study platform to demonstrate how large-scale social media data can be gathered, segmented, and triangulated alongside qualitative netnographic analysis, extending what manual data collection can achieve while retaining the interpretive depth that distinguishes netnography from simple content analysis.

=== Key source person ===
The key to understand the culture is to find rich data from a 'key source person'. To find the reason behind perception of a brand or the reason behind brand loyalty, a netnographer needs to comb through the comments sections to find consumers with a particularly strong attitude - either negative or positive - towards the brand in question.

=== Cultural fluency ===
The goal of a netnographer is cultural literacy or "fluency", which means that at the end of the research, the researcher should be fluent in the symbolic language of the site's users that they have an almost biographical authority regarding them.

== Cultural meaning embedded in the internet ==
Unlike the fetishization of big data and its attempt to portray a generic, characterization of markets in online communities (i.e., frequency of brand engagement), netnography enables researchers "to argue for a central tenet" (Kozinets, 2016, p. 2) that emerges from the collected data that represents a particular market. Netnography has an advantage over ethnography in that it focuses primarily on the context of textual communication and any affiliated multimedia elements, whereas ethnography focuses primarily on physical forms of human communication (e.g., body language) (Bartl et al., p. 168). Since Netnography uses spontaneous data and conducts observation without intruding online users, it is regarded as more naturalistic than other approaches such as interviews, focus groups, surveys and experiments (Kozinets, 2015). While online communication has a relatively shorter duration in efficiency when compared to human communication, the speed in collecting online communication is much faster and far less expensive than traditional in-person ethnography and other qualitative methodologies like focus groups or interviews (Kozinets 2002). It is also a challenging approach involving work to tackle unpredictable and abundant data (Kozinets, 2015).

The need to understand the cultural meaning of online communities (e.g., Reddit; LinkedIn) has grown exponentially since the appraisal of Web 2.0 interfaces (i.e., user-generated content), along with other technological advances. One can no longer assume that people are isolating themselves from the physical world with technology, but rather view technology such as computer-mediated communication and digital information as a gateway that allows them to interact with familiar and, at times, anonymous users on a given occasion. Furthermore, cultural practices within the physical world are extended to, and enhanced by, these online communities, where people can choose a dating partner, learn about a religion and make brand choices, just to name a few examples. With ethnography's influence on netnography, this research method enables the researcher to link the communication patterns in order to understand the tacit and latent practices involved within and between these online communities of interest (Mariampolski, 2005). As Kozinets (Kozinets 1998, p. 366) pointed out, "these social groups have a 'real' existence for their participants, and thus have consequential effects on many aspects of behaviour, including consumer behavior" (see also Muniz and O'Guinn, 2001).

People participating in these online communities often share in-depth insights on themselves, their lifestyles, and the reasons behind the choices they make as consumers (brands, products etc.). Such insights have the potential of becoming something actionable. More specifically, this means that the researcher will be able to present an unknown and unseen truth to his/her client (Cayla & Arnold, 2013) so that they are able to make better decisions in engaging with a target community, whether it be in a form of an advertising or a non-profit campaign. While netnography has been predominantly applied within the field of marketing (Bengry-Howell, 2011), its methods can help researchers and their clients within social sciences to create an empathetic understanding of people's cultural behavior via online, and to allow the researcher and clients to 'immerse themselves' in the consumer domain (Kozinets, 2002; Piller et al., 2011; in Bartl et al., 2016, p. 167). The following information provides a systematic process to search for, collect and analyze data (Bartl et al., 2016, p. 168; see also Kozinets, 2000, 2010)

1. Define the research field. Develop a detailed research question(s) that allows the researcher to qualitatively find patterns.
2. Communication identification and selection. Use online search engines in order to identify appropriate, research-related online communities, which the researcher will then need to analyze and select details about the community, its members, and its forum.
3. Community observation and data collection. Observe the selected online communities in a non-participatory, non-biased manner. The researcher will then need to retrieve data from people's communication and data from personal observation.
4. Data analysis. Analyze data with automated software and manual methods in order to uncover patterns from the data analyses.
5. Research ethics. With regards to ethics, be vigilant in ensuring the online community members' anonymity and confidentiality.
6. Finding and solutions. Apply an empathetic perspective in order to obtain a deep understanding about the people of interest in order for the solutions to be well translated and trustworthy.

Netnography offers a range of insights for front end innovation, providing:

1. Holistic marketplace descriptions
2. Communicative and cultural comprehension
3. Embedded understanding of consumer choice
4. Naturalistic views of brand meaning
5. Discovery of consumer innovation
6. Mappings of sociocultural online space

=== Data collection ===
Netnography collects data from Internet data, interviews data and fieldnotes

1. Internet data: Researchers should spend the time to match their research questions and interests to appropriate online forum, using the novel resources of online search engines such as Yahoo! and Google groups, before initiating entrée. Before initiating contact as a participant, or beginning formal data collection, the distinctive characteristics of the online communities should be familiar to the netnographer.
2. Interview data: The interview can be conducted via email, Skype, in person, or by using other methods. Netnography’s emphasis on Internet data does not ameliorate the need to establish data in context and to extend understanding of those data into related concepts, archives, communications, and sites.
3. Fieldnotes: Reflective fieldnotes, in which ethnographers record their observations, are a time-tested and recommended method in netnography. Although some netnographies have been conducted using only observation and download, without the researcher writing a single fieldnote, this non-participant approach draws into question the ethnographic orientation of the investigation.

As with grounded theory, data collection should continue as long as new insights are being generated. For purposes of precision, some netnographers closely track the amount of text collected and read, and the number of distinct participants. CAQDAS software solutions can expedite coding, content analysis, data linking, data display, and theory-building functions. New forms of qualitative data analysis are constantly being developed by a variety of firms (such as MotiveQuest and Neilsen BuzzMetrics), although the results of these firms are more like content analyses of than ethnographic representations (Kozinets 2006). Netnography and content analysis differed in the adoption of computational methods for collecting semi-automated data, analyzing data, recognizing words and visualizing data (Kozinets, 2016). However, some scholars dispute netnography's distance from content analysis, preferring to assert that it is also a content analytic technique (Langer & Beckman 2005).

=== Data analysis ===
Distinct from data mining and content analysis, netnography as a method emphasizes the cultural contextualizing of online data. This often proves to be challenging in the social-cues-impoverished online context. Because netnography is based primarily upon the observation of textual discourse, ensuring trustworthy interpretations requires a different approach than the balancing of discourse and observed behavior that occurs during in-person ethnography. Although the online landscape mediates social representation and renders problematic the issue of informant identity, netnography seems perfectly amenable to treating behavior or the social act as the ultimate unit of analysis, rather than the individual person.

=== Research ethics ===
Research ethics may be one of the most important differences between traditional ethnography and netnography. Ethical concerns over netnography turn on early concerns about whether online forums are to be considered a private or a public site, and about what constitutes informed consent in cyberspace (see Paccagnella 1997). In a major departure from traditional methods, netnography uses cultural information that is not given specifically, and in confidence, to the researcher. The consumers who originally created the data do not necessarily intend or welcome its use in research representations. Netnography therefore offers specific guidelines regarding when to cite online posters and authors, how to cite them, what to consider in an ethical netnographic representation, when to ask permission, and when permission is not necessary (Kozinets 2002; cf. Langer & Beckman 2005).

=== Advantages and limitations ===
Compared to surveys, experiments, focus groups, and personal interviews, netnography can be less obtrusive. It is conducted using observations in a context that is not fabricated by the researcher. Netnography also is less costly and timelier than focus groups and personal interviews.

The limitations of netnography draw from the need for researcher interpretive skill, and the lack of informant identifiers present in the online context that can lead to difficulty generalizing results to groups outside the sample. However, these limitations can be ameliorated somewhat by careful use of convergent data collection methods that bridge offline and online research in a systematic manner, as well as by careful sampling and interpretive approaches (Kozinets 1998, 2002). Researchers wishing to generalize the findings of a netnography of a particular online group to other groups must apply careful evaluations of similarity and consider using multiple methods for research triangulation. Netnography is still a relatively new method, and awaits further development and refinement at the hands of a new generation of Internet-savvy ethnographic researchers. However, several researchers are developing the techniques in social networking sites, virtual worlds, mobile communities, and other novel computer-mediated social domains.

== Types of netnography ==
According to Kozinets, any netnography will fall into one of four categories: auto, symbolic, digital or humanist. These types of netnography are defined by distinctive axiologies and foci. In order to visualize how a netnography is defined one should Imagine a simple 2X2 figure. Along the figure's x-axis we see that a netnography can be defined by whether or not it supports or challenges the status quo of business and management. In this way we determine a netnography's axiological representation orientation as either "critical", meant to disrupt, or "complementary", meant to assist in decision making. If we turn our focus to the y-axis of our imaginary figure, we see then that a netnography can also be categorized by its analytic field focus, or what it examines based on its orientation. A netnography can be deemed "global" if its focus is on a larger and more general system, or we can think of it as "local" if it narrows its scope to particular iterations of that more general system.

Through the combination these distinct parameters we can end up with the four types of netnography:

1. Auto-netnography: Is the critical and local form of netnography due to the fact that the researcher must render the data through their own identity. It can be thought of as an adaption of auto-ethnography as it also contains personal and auto-biographical elements. However, an auto-netnography must also possess a distinctly critical element in its understanding of the netnographers own position in time suffused with technologically mediated communication.
2. Symbolic netnography: The most commonly used version of netnography, it is both local and complementary. Utilizes social media information and interaction to render identities around individuals or websites in order to inform business decision making. It tends to focus on a particular group or field site and illustrate the group's practices, meanings and generate a more action based understanding of particular consumers.
3. Digital netnography: Sits on the intersection of complementary axiology and global focus. Connects statistical data analysis with cultural understandings, meaning it encompasses a large amount of social data, but always with drive toward deeper cultural understanding, rather than just statistical trends. Along with symbolic netnography, digital netnography looks to reinforce existing business, management and social practices.
4. Humanist netnographies: Focused on research questions with deep social import. Utilizes social media data to attempt to answer these questions and influence social change. Places the researcher firmly in the position of an advocate, and can even push him into activism.
