= Observatoire Zététique =

French skeptical organization

Observatoire Zététique Zetetic Observatory
- Formation: 2003; 23 years ago
- Type: Association loi de 1901
- Purpose: Promoting and spreading the methods and techniques of zététique
- Headquarters: Grenoble
- Region served: France
- President: Serge Bret-Morel
- Website: zetetique.fr Pronunciation of 'Observatoire Zététique'

The Observatoire Zététique or OZ (English: Zetetic Observatory) is a French skeptical nonprofit organisation founded in 2003, headquartered in Grenoble. It is a member of the European Council of Skeptical Organisations (ECSO).

== Purpose ==
The OZ's stated goal is "promoting and spreading the methods and techniques of zététique" (defined as "a research method based on doubt and verification of information", in English better known as scientific skepticism). It seeks to:

- conduct investigations of the paranormal,
- set up experiments to evaluate the existence of purported paranormal phenomena,
- publish the results of tests,
- provide documentation, organise conferences and exposés on recurrent themes concerning the supernatural,
- reproduce phenomena that have been declared "impossible".

The Observatoire Zététique affirms it maintains a respectful approach to the freedom to believe tenets of the paranormal, to avoid dogmatism and to only comment on the validity of the evidence and reasonings.

== Activities ==
The OZ explores mechanisms of disinformation on the Internet.

The OZ publishes its researches and dossiers online, and produces a monthly newsletter, the POZ (Publication de l'Observatoire Zététique).

Regarding the Trans-en-Provence Case, a 1981 incident where a UFO is supposed to have left behind physical evidence near the town of Trans-en-Provence, the Observatory has done extensive investigations.

On 20 and 21 September 2008, the Observatoire Zététique organised the ECSO symposium in Grenoble.

== Reception ==
Vincent Brunner of Les Inrocks commented that "On topics that are real springboards to fantasies (...) the skeptics at the Observatoire Zététique [offer] a recurring and valuable response (...): they know how to put things in their place."

== See also ==
- Association française pour l'information scientifique
- CICAP
- Comité Para
- International Zetetic Challenge
- Laboratoire de Zététique
- List of prizes for evidence of the paranormal
- Science et pseudo-sciences
