= Jean-Claude Pecker =

French astronomer and astrophysicist (1923–2020)

Professor Jean-Claude Pecker
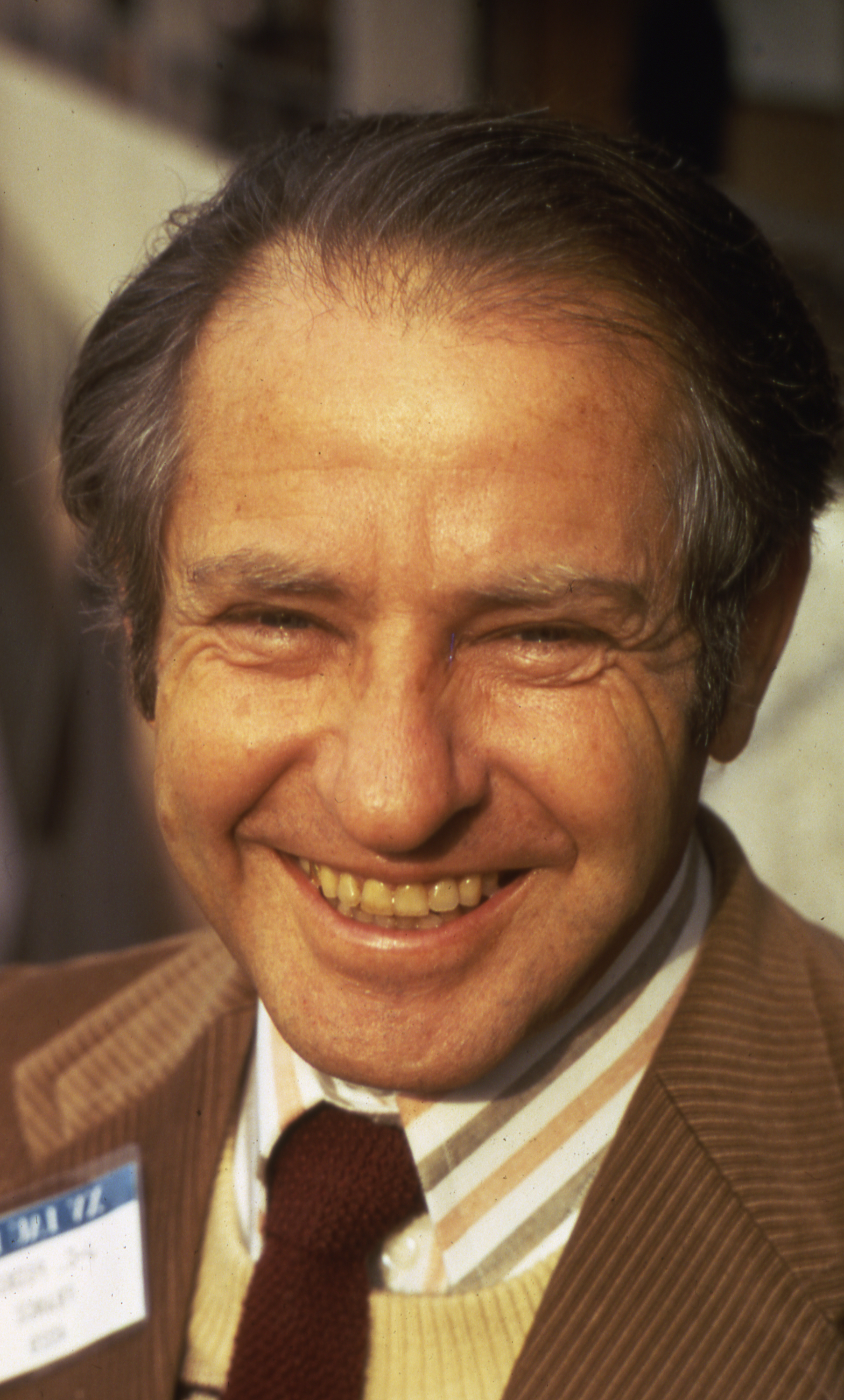
- Pecker in 1973
- Born: 10 May 1923; Reims, France
- Died: 20 February 2020 (aged 96); Île d'Yeu, France
- Education: Lycée Michel-de-Montaigne
- Alma mater: École normale supérieure University of Bordeaux; University of Grenoble
- Awards: Prix Jules Janssen (1967); Three Physicists Prize (1969); Commander of the Legion of Honour; Grand Cross of the National Order of Merit; Commander of the Ordre des Palmes Académiques
- Scientific career
- Fields: Theoretical astrophysics
- Workplaces: Professor emeritus at the Collège de France, Paris

Jean-Claude Pecker (10 May 1923 – 20 February 2020) was a French astronomer, astrophysicist and author, member of the French Academy of Sciences and director of the Nice Observatory. He served as the secretary-general of the International Astronomical Union from 1964 to 1967. Pecker was the President of the Société astronomique de France (SAF), the French amateur astronomical society, from 1973–1976. He was awarded the Prix Jules Janssen by the French Astronomical Society in 1967. A minor planet (1629 Pecker) is named after him. Pecker was a vocal opponent of astrology and pseudo-science and was the president of the Association française pour l'information scientifique (AFIS), a skeptical organisation which promotes scientific enquiry in the face of quackery and obscurantism.

== Early life ==
Jean-Claude Pecker was born 10 May 1923, in Reims, to Victor-Noël Pecker and Nelly Catherine née Hermann (a teacher of Philosophy and Literature), in the department of Marne, France. The grandson of Joseph Hermann, rabbi of Valenciennes and later Reims, Pecker was born in his maternal grandparents' house, moving later to Bordeaux. In the summer of 1941 they moved to the Hermann house in Paris because of anti-Jewish restrictions placed on his parents during the Vichy regime. In May 1944 both his parents were transported to Auschwitz where they died, while his grandmother, absent during the raid, was hidden by neighbour Ida Barrett who was later designated by the state of Israel as one of the Righteous Among the Nations for her actions to conceal the old lady until the liberation of Paris. Pecker was interested in astronomy from a young age. He studied at the Lycée Michel de Montaigne de Bordeaux but was forced to go into hiding during the Second World War. After the Liberation of France he attended the École Normale Supérieure in Paris. In October 1946 he joined the Institut d'astrophysique de Paris and studied for the agrégation of physics and chemistry, where he studied under, and had his doctoral thesis judged by Nobel Prize winning physicist Alfred Kastler. He earned his doctorate in May 1950. At the Institut d’Astrophysique he got to know and shared an office with Evry Schatzman with whom he collaborated for many years.

== Professional career ==
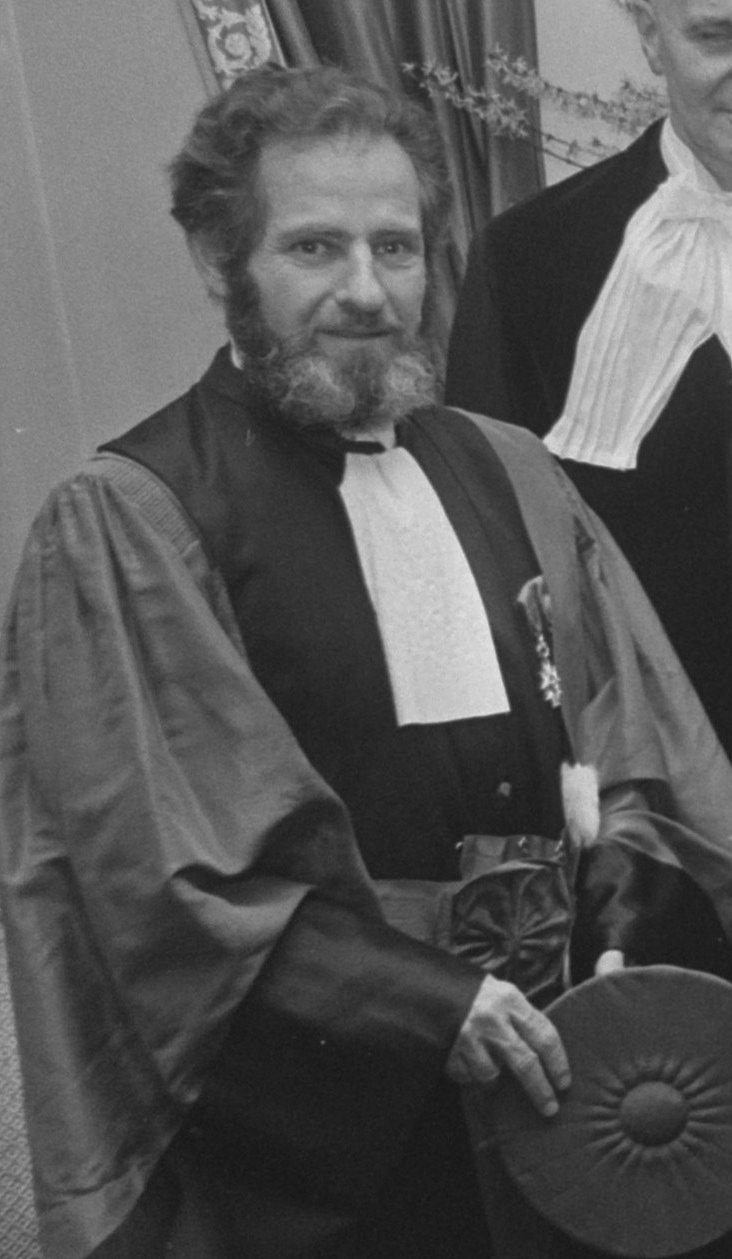
Pecker in 1970

From 1952 to 1955 Pecker was associate professor of astronomy and astrophysics at the University of Clermont-Ferrand. From early in his career he held many international appointments including fellow of the High Altitude Observatory in Colorado, USA. In 1955 he became astronomer for the Paris Observatory followed by director of the Nice Observatory in 1961. In 1963 Pecker became professor of theoretical astrophysics at the Collège de France in Paris, a position he held until 1988 when he became honorary professor. He was also director of the French National Centre for Scientific Research (CNRS) Institute of Astrophysics from 1972–1978. His main fields of work within astrophysics were solar and stellar atmospheres and Sun-Earth interactions. He was also known for questioning the standard Big Bang theory, positing "alternative but partial solutions" (a quasi-static model) and was signatory, with 33 other scientists, to an open letter to the scientific community expressing concern over the dominance of the Big Bang and expansion of the Universe theories. They complained that the tired light theory in particular was generally discounted or ignored by most cosmologists at the time of writing.

=== Positions held ===
- 1952–1955 Professor at the Faculty of Science, University of Clermont-Ferrand
- 1955–1962 Astronomer of the Paris Observatory
- 1962–1969 Director of the Nice Observatory
- 1963–1988 Professor of theoretical astrophysics at the Collège de France and honorary professor thereafter
- 1964–1967 General secretary of the Société astronomique de France and President thereafter until 1976
- 1964–1967 General Secretary of the IAU (International Astronomical Union)
- 1972–1979 Director of the French National Centre for Scientific Research (CNRS) Institute of Astrophysics
- 1978 President of the French association for the advancement of science
- 1983–1985 President of the Comité d'Orientation du Musée de la Villette
- 1986–1988 President of the Comité National de culture scientifique et technique
- 1988 Vice-chair of the Scientific committee of the Musées de France
- 1989–1992 Vice-President of the Academia Europaea
- 1990–1996 Vice-President of the French UNESCO committee and thereafter permanent representative to UNESCO of the International Humanist and Ethical Union (IHEU)
- 1999–2001 President of the Association française pour l'information scientifique

In the 1950s Pecker spent a year as associate fellow of the High Altitude Observatory at Boulder, Colorado. Pecker was also associate member of the Royal Society of Science (Liege), associate of the Royal Astronomical Society, member of the National Academy of Bordeaux, the Royal Academies for Science and the Arts of Belgium, the European Academy of Sciences and Arts and honorary associate of Rationalist International, member of the Academia Europaea and sat on the international advisory board of the Institute for Science and Human Values. Pecker was also a member of the International Astronomical Union (IAU).

=== Publications ===
Pecker wrote and co-wrote many books and over 700 academic papers on subjects such as cosmology, astronomy, astrophysics, human rights, pseudo-science, poetry and art. He also presented paintings at exhibitions in France. He also wrote popular science articles and books for the general public, some of which have been translated into other languages. His books include:

- The Sky (1959)
- Astrophysique Générale (with Evry Schatzman, 1959)
- The Orion Book of the Sky (Translated by William D. O'Gorman) (1960)
- Contribution to the spectral type theory: iv Formation of lines in stellar spectra (1963)
- Experimental Astronomy (translated by Robert Kandel) (1970)
- Space Observatories (Astrophysics and Space Science Library) (1970)
- Papa, dis-moi, qu'est-ce que c'est que l'Astronomie (1971) Book republished in January 2022 by Z4 Éditions.
- Stellar Paths: Photographic Astrometry with Long-Focus Instruments (1981)
- Clefs pour l'Astronomie (1981)
- Understanding the Universe: the impact of space astronomy (ed. West) (1983)
- Sous l'Étoile Soleil (1984)
- Astronomie Flammartion (1986)
- Building a world community: Humanism in the 21st century (ed. Paul Kurtz) (1989)
- The Future of the Sun (translated Maurice Robine) (1990)
- Pour comprendre l'Univers (w.Delsemme & Reeves 1988)
- L'avenir du Soleil (1990)
- Le Promeneur du Soleil (1992)
- Le Soleil est une étoile (1992)
- The Mars Effect (with Claude Benski) (1996)
- Understanding the Heavens: 30 centuries of astronomical ideas from ancient thinking to modern cosmology (English edition 2001)
- La photographie astronomique (2004)
- Current issues in cosmology (Cambridge University Press, 2006)

=== Foreword of scientific literature ===
- Pierre Bayart, La méridienne de France : et l'aventure de sa prolongation jusqu'aux Baléares, Paris, L'Harmattan, coll. « Acteurs de la science », 2007, 250 p. (ISBN 978-2-296-03874-5)
- Serge Rochain, Histoire de la mesure des distances cosmiques : de Hipparque à Hubble, Londres, ISTE éditions, coll. « Histoire des sciences et des techniques », 2016, 222 p. (ISBN 978-1-78405-201-0)
- Arkan Simaan, La science au péril de sa vie : Les aventuriers de la mesure du monde, Paris, Adapt/Vuibert, coll. « Histoire des sciences », 2001, 206 p. (ISBN 2-909680-41-X)
- Arkan Simaan, L’Image du monde de Newton à Einstein, Paris, Adapt/Vuibert, coll. « Histoire des sciences », 2005, 152 p. (ISBN 2-909680-67-3)

== Humanism ==
Pecker was vice-president of the French UNESCO committee in 1990, afterwards becoming a French permanent representative to UNESCO on behalf of the International Humanist and Ethical Union (IHEU), an organisation which reflected his humanist approach to his life's work. Pecker spoke out against the governments punitive immigration laws, publicly supporting the National Coordination of Sans Papiers (CNSP) organisation. He was awarded the International Humanist Award for services to Humanism from the International Humanist and Ethical Union (IHEU) in 2005 and acted as a permanent representative to UNESCO on behalf of the IHEU. Pecker was also a laureate of the International Academy of Humanism.

== Personal life ==
Pecker married Charlotte Wimel in 1947 with whom he had three children: Martine Kemeny, Daniel and Laure. They divorced in 1964. In 1974 he married Anne-Marie Vormser who died in 2002. In addition to his scientific disciplines Pecker also wrote poetry and created works of art. When asked what astrophysics is for he replied,

Nothing, fortunately!..Astrophysics brings no financial reward, but nowadays the only reward that counts is economic! Astrophysics is used to understand the Universe. It is essentially an intellectual discipline, for the pleasure of understanding, the pleasure of knowing, for the accumulation of knowledge. Astrophysics is for creating happiness.

== Awards ==
- Commander of the Légion d'Honneur
- Grand Cross of the National Order of Merit (France)
- Commander of the Ordre des Palmes Académiques
- 1966 Manley-Bendall Prize from the Academy of Bordeaux
- 1967 Jules-Janssen Prize, the highest award for Astronomy from the French Astronomical Society (SAF)
- 1967 Janssen Medal for significant advances in the field of astrophysics
- 1969 Three Physicists Prize
- 1972 Medal from the University of Nice
- 1973 Prix Jean Perrin, for popularising science to the general public
- 1977 Member of the French Academy of Sciences
- 1981 Medaille de l’Adion of the Nice Observatory
- 1983 Rationalist Union prize
- 1984 Personalité de l'Année
- 1996 Stroobant Prize from the Royal Academies for Science and the Arts of Belgium
- 1996 Lodén Prize from the Royal Society of Sciences in Uppsala
- 2005 International Humanist Award, for services to Humanism from the International Humanist and Ethical Union (IHEU)

Pecker also has a minor planet (1629) named in his honour, discovered by L. Boyer.
