= Teissier affair =

2002 French scientific controversy

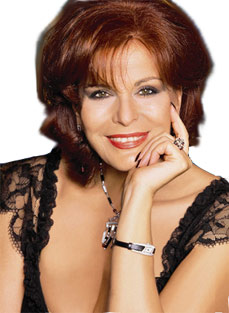
Élizabeth Teissier in 2009

The Teissier affair was a controversy that occurred in France in 2001. French astrologer Élizabeth Teissier was awarded a doctorate in sociology by Paris Descartes University for a doctoral thesis in which she argued that astrology was being oppressed by science. Her work was contested by the scientific community within the context of the science wars, and compared to the Sokal hoax. Criticisms included the alleged failure to work within the field of sociology and also lacking the necessary scientific rigour for a doctoral thesis in any scientific field. The university and jury who awarded the degree were harshly criticised, though both they and Teissier had supporters and defenders.

== Teissier's doctorate ==
On April 7, 2001, Elizabeth Teissier defended her thesis entitled Situation épistémologique de l'astrologie à travers l'ambivalence fascination-rejet dans les sociétés postmodernes ("The Epistemological Situation of Astrology in Relation to the Ambivalent Fascination/Rejection of Postmodern Societies") – accounts of the defense have been published. Her studies at the University of Paris Descartes were under the supervision of Michel Maffesoli, an Emeritus Professor of Sociology. The central idea of the thesis was described by The New York Times as being that astrology is being oppressed by science, which Teissier called "official science" and "monolithic thought". Teissier argued, however, that her work is devoid of bias and had "focused only on the misunderstanding that astrology as a multimillennial knowledge vehicle" provokes. Her prepared statement was enthusiastically received by her supporters, but there was also a declaration from the editor-in-chief of Science et Vie Junior that what was occurring was a "farce". At end of the defense, the jury deliberated only briefly before Serge Moscovici admitted Teissier to her doctoral degree with the "very honourable" distinction.

== Initial reaction ==
Controversy erupted in the scientific community following the decision, and several sociologists also publicly challenged its legitimacy. The university was criticised for granting the degree, as was the jury, along with Teissier's statements in support of astrology as a science, though the university rejected accusations of "irresponsibility". A petition signed by over 370 sociologists was sent to Professor Pierre Daumard, the President of the university; he responded that the Teissier had complied with all university requirements and it is not his place to question the "guarantees of the scientific validity of the thesis" from the independent jury. Daumard also defended that astrology is a legitimate subject for sociological study for its impact on society, a point on which Teissier's critics agreed. These critics were themselves criticised for their "incendiary" complaints which targeted her personally for her astrological beliefs instead of based on her thesis. Critics were also described as engaging in a witch-hunt whose true target was the academic reputation of Michel Maffesoli. Maffesoli addressed the controversy in an email on 23 April 2001, acknowledging that the thesis included some "slippages" but minimising the importance of these errors. Maffesoli added that there is a "manhunt" against him and more broadly against scientific and intellectual rigor in "diverse approaches to sociology", but still engaged with critics such as Christian Baudelot at an ASES-organised symposium on the Teissier affair. Maffesoli did state during the defense that he had tried to keep Teissier focused on the sociological impact of astrology rather than discussing its scientific legitimacy, while still maintaining that the thesis demonstrated sufficient sociological significance to justify awarding the doctorate.

== AFIS analysis ==
Once the thesis was available following the defense, the Association française pour l'information scientifique (AFIS) organised a group to critique the thesis; the analysis was published by a multi-disciplinary group (two experts in pseudoscience, including the editor of the AFIS Science et pseudo-sciences, three astrophysicists, two sociologists, and a philosopher) on 6 August 2001. They looked at the scientific, philosophical, and sociological aspects of Teissier's thesis, describing it as "not a thesis in sociology but actually pro-astrological advocacy". They concluded that the Teissier's work did not meet the requirements of scientific rigor of doctoral research, regardless of the discipline in question. They described the jury as having accepted the thesis "in defiance of basic academic requirements of objectivity and intellectual honesty" in part because the AFIS group's multidisciplinary analysis shows that "no relevant standard (analytical rigor, objectivity, indication of sources, style of writing, etc.) had truly been fulfilled". They comment all Teissier has achieved is to "demonstrate once again that [astrology] does not deserve the status of an intellectual discipline that can be taught in a university course". According to the journal Skepter, the "thesis pretends to provide irrefutable proof that astrology is a science, but the author has no idea what constitutes a scientific proof, she is muddleminded about basic astronomical and astrological facts, and the pièce de resistance of her argument consists of statements about Michel Gauquelin which can only be called lies." Examples of excerpts from the thesis which bear this out, according to Broch, include unsupported medical claims, fundamental errors in astronomy, and a lack of proper evidence. Teissier was "completely appalled" that a "tiny group" would question the award of her doctorate and did not exclude the possibility of suing the AFIS, who published the critique of her thesis, after its "intolerable attack" on academic freedom.

== Wider context ==
Discussion of the circumstances of Teissier's doctorate occurred and continues to occur with the context of the science wars, a dispute which pitted humanities academics taking postmodernist perspectives against scientists taking positivist and rationalist approaches. In particular, comparisons have been made to the Sokal hoax, in that each case exemplifies the alleged support for pseudoscience and hostility to science within postmodernist circles. The emphatic language and personalised tone of the debate around Teissier's work was fuelled by the broader ongoing conflict, as was the targeting of Maffesoli and the description of the university as "heavily influenced by so-called post-modern ideologists" (emphasis in original). It also explains criticisms of the jury for its failure to seek input from scientists (a bone of contention in the science wars), and the unusually personalised tone of comments such as that Teissier, "very astutely, has taken advantage of the intellectual weakness and/or incompetence of ... the nincompoops who accepted to ratify such nonsense" (bold emphases from original omitted).
