= Claude Mulot =

French screenwriter and film director

Claude Mulot (1942–1986) was a French screenwriter and film director who mainly specialized in adult films, but also made various attempts in other genres like horror films (The Blood Rose), comedies (Le jour se lève et les conneries commencent) and thrillers (Le Couteau sous la gorge). He accidentally drowned at the early age of 44 while his screenplay On se calme et on boit frais à Saint-Tropez was being shot by Max Pécas in Saint-Tropez in 1986.

== Filmography ==
=== as a director ===
- 1968 : Sexyrella starring Véronique Beauchêne and Velly Beguard
- 1970 : The Blood Rose (La Rose écorchée) starring Anny Duperey, Philippe Lemaire, Howard Vernon and Elizabeth Teissier
- 1970 : La Saignée starring Bruno Pradal, Charles Southwood and Patti D'Arbanville
- 1973 : Profession : Aventuriers starring Nathalie Delon and André Pousse
- 1974 : Les Charnelles (a.k.a. Émotions secrètes d'un jeune homme de bonne famille) starring Anne Libert and Francis Lemonnier
- 1974 : There's Nothing Wrong with Being Good to Yourself (C'est jeune et ça sait tout, a.k.a. Y'a pas de mal à se faire du bien / L'éducatrice) starring Jean Lefebvre, Michel Galabru and Andrée Cousineau
- 1975 : Le sexe qui parle starring Pénélope Lamour and Sylvia Bourdon
- 1976 : Shocking! starring Emmanuelle Parèze and Karine Gambier
- 1976 : Échanges de partenaires starring Karine Gambier
- 1976 : La Rage de jouir starring Marie-Christine Guennec
- 1977 : Suprêmes jouissances
- 1977 : La Grande Baise
- 1977 : Insomnies sous les tropiques starring Barbara Moose
- 1978 : Le Sexe qui parle 2 starring Erika Cool
- 1980 : La Femme objet starring Marilyn Jess
- 1980 : L'Immorale starring Sylvia Lamo and Isabelle Illiers
- 1980 : Les Petites Écolières starring Brigitte Lahaie, Marilyn Jess and Cathy Stewart
- 1981 : Le jour se lève et les conneries commencent starring Henri Guybet and Maurice Risch
- 1983 : Black Venus starring Joséphine Jacqueline Jones and Karin Schubert
- 1986 : Le Couteau sous la gorge starring Florence Guérin and Brigitte Lahaie
