= Michelle Schatzman =

French mathematician (1949–2010)

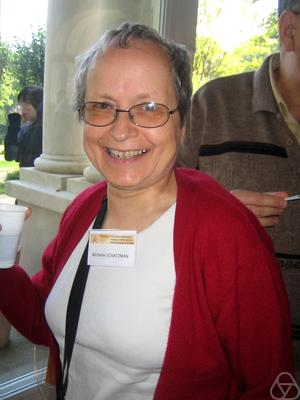
- Schatzman in 2007
- Born: Michelle Véra Schatzman; 8 December 1949; Lyon, France
- Died: 20 August 2010 (aged 60)
- Education: Université Paris VI
- Father: Evry Schatzman
- Awards: Chevalier de la Légion d'honneur
- Scientific career
- Fields: Mathematics
- Workplaces: Claude Bernard University Lyon 1
- Doctoral advisors: Haïm Brezis; Jacques-Louis Lions

Michelle Véra Schatzman (8 December 1949 – 20 August 2010) was a French analyst and mathematician, specializing in applied mathematics, particularly in topics related to nonlinear analysis and numerical analysis. She combined her role as a CNRS research director with teaching as a professor at the Claude Bernard University Lyon 1. In 1996, in collaboration with S. Jon Chapman and Jacob Rubinstein, Schatzmann developed a mean-field theory of the vorticity density of superconductivity vortices, now called the Chapman–Rubinstein–Schatzman model. In physics, the model is used to describe type-II superconductors.

== Early life and education ==
Michelle Véra Schatzman was born in a secular Jewish family. Her father was French astrophysicist Evry Schatzman, who also was president of the Rationalist Union. Her mother Ruth Schatzman (née Fisher) took a keen interest in Russian folk tales. She was an associate of Russian in high schools in Lille and Paris, then a lecturer at the Paris VIII University.

Schatzman entered the École normale supérieure de jeunes filles in 1968 and was top of the class. She earned the agregation and a PhD in 1971, under the leadership of Haïm Brezis and a state doctorate in 1979 under the direction of Jacques Louis Lions.

Michelle Schatzman married Yves Pigier in 1975. They had two children. They divorced in 1988. Her daughter is married to Dan Mangoubi, an Israeli mathematician and a professor at the Albert Einstein Institute of the University of Jerusalem.

== Career ==
Schatzman led something of a hybrid career, dividing her time between research and teaching.

She was first an attaché, then a research assistant from 1972 to 1984 at the Laboratoire d'analyse numérique in Paris 6, now Laboratoire Jacques-Louis Lions, then from spring 1981, at the Center of Applied Mathematics of the École Polytechnique.

She became a professor at the Claude Bernard University Lyon 1 in 1984, in the Lyon-Saint-Étienne digital analysis team, which in 1995 became the Laboratory for Applied Mathematics in Lyon (MAPLY), which Schatzman headed for eight years. This laboratory merged in 2005 with other laboratories in Lyons, leading to the establishment of the Institut Camille Jordan.

In 1996, S. Jon Chapman, Jacob Rubinstein and Schatzmann developed a mean-field theory of the vorticity density of superconductivity vortices, now called the Chapman–Rubinstein–Schatzman model.

She returned to the CNRS in 2005 as a research director while continuing to teach, especially master students.

Schatzman spent extended stays in foreign universities including the University of California at Berkley, the Institute of Mathematics and its Applications in Minneapolis, and the Courant Institute in New York City.

After suffering from cancer, Michelle Schatzman died in Lyon on 20 August 2010, aged 60.

== Honours and awards ==
- Knight of the Legion of Honor (2008).
- Prize of Mme Claude Berthault awarded by the French Academy of Sciences in 2006.

In 2026, Schatzman was announced as one of 72 historical women in STEM whose names were to be added to the 72 men already celebrated on the Eiffel Tower. The plan was conceived by a student and tour guide named Benjamin Rigaud and it was announced by the Mayor of Paris, Anne Hidalgo following the recommendations of a committee led by Isabelle Vauglin of Femmes et Sciences and Jean-François Martins, representing the operating company which runs the Eiffel Tower.

== Selected publications ==
Over the years, Schatzman published over 70 papers, many of which continue to be cited today.

Her books include:

- Numerical Analysis, A Mathematical Approach, first published by Masson in 1991 and reprinted by Dunod in 2001
- Numerical Analysis: A Mathematical Introduction (2002), Clarendon Press, Oxford. ISBN 0-19-850279-6.
