= Laboratoire de Zététique =

French research and educational institution

Laboratoire de Zététique Zetetic Laboratory
- Formation: 1998; 28 years ago
- Type: Research centre and educational institution
- Purpose: Investigation of paranormal claims; promotion of critical thinking
- Headquarters: University of Nice Sophia Antipolis
- Region served: France
- President: Henri Broch
- Website: unice.fr/zetetique/ Pronunciation of 'Laboratoire de Zététique'

The Laboratoire de Zététique (English: Zetetic Laboratory) is a structure founded by professor Henri Broch in 1998.

== Purpose and history ==
The laboratory is a research and information centre concerned with purported "paranormal" or "abnormal" phenomena. The goal is dissemination of the scientific method and zététique (defined as "the art of doubt", in English better known as scientific skepticism).

Logo of the CAZ.

The Laboratoire de Zététique is run by an association called the Centre d'Analyse Zététique (Centre for Zetetic Analysis), which publishes the CAZette (a portmanteau of gazette and its abbreviation CAZ) since November 2011. Since 2005, it is affiliated with the Center for Inquiry as "Center for Inquiry–France", with Henri Broch as its spokesperson and ambassador of CFI–Transnational.

Between 1987 and 2002, the laboratory offered the International Zetetic Challenge for an award of €200,000; no one has ever succeeded in demonstrating a paranormal phenomenon under these controlled conditions, however. Mediums and clairvoyants were challenged to show their powers, but all 275 (or 264) candidates failed.

In 2004, the UFO skeptic Claude Maugé presented on the site of the laboratory his Composite Reductionist Theory (TCR) about UFOs to explain this phenomenon.

Following Joe Nickell, Henri Broch once replicated the Shroud of Turin, demonstrating the bas-relief method as an easy explanation of how the Shroud could have been faked.

In October 2007, Richard Monvoisin became the first Doctor of Science Education on the subject of skepticism. His thesis, titled Pour une didactique de l'esprit critique – Zététique & utilisation des interstices pseudoscientifiques dans les médias ("For Education in Critical Thinking. Skepticism & Usage of Pseudoscientific Interstices in the Media"), was co-edited by codirected by Henri Broch and Patrick Lévy (Institut du sommeil et de la vigilance, faculté de médecine, Grenoble 1). Together with other French academics from other universities in Grenoble, Marseille, Montpellier etc., he founded the Collectif de recherche transdisciplinaire esprit critique et sciences (Cortecs) ("Interdisciplinary Research Collective on Critical Thinking and Science"). As of 2015, the Laboratoire de Zététique no longer offers courses on skepticism, but they have been transferred to the Joseph Fourier University of Grenoble, where Monvoisin's lectures on "Zététique & autodéfense intellectuelle" ("Skepticism & Intellectual Self-Defence") attract up to 900 students.

== See also ==
- Association française pour l'information scientifique
- CICAP
- Comité Para
- International Zetetic Challenge
- List of prizes for evidence of the paranormal
- Observatoire Zététique
