= Élizabeth Teissier =

French astrologer

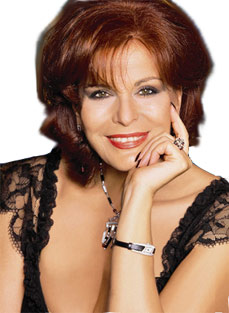
- Teissier in May 2009
- Born: Germaine Élizabeth Hanselmann; 6 January 1938 (age 88); Algiers, French Algeria
- Occupations: Model; Actress; Astrologer; Television presenter; Author
- Website: http://www.eteissier.com/

Élizabeth Teissier (born Germaine Élizabeth Hanselmann, 6 January 1938) is a French astrologer and former model and actress. Between 1975 and 1976, she created a daily horoscope on French television channel Antenne 2, and in 1981, she launched the Astro Show television programme in Germany. Her personal clients included former President of France François Mitterrand, and she has published several books on astrology. A test that compared her predictions against common sense and chance failed to show any evidence of her having any special powers.

She has been involved in several controversies, including the award of a Doctorate in Sociology for her thesis which argued that astrology was being oppressed by science. Her work was contested by the scientific community; criticisms included the alleged failure to work within the field of sociology and also lacking the necessary scientific rigour for a doctoral thesis in any scientific field. The university and jury who awarded the degree were harshly criticised, though both they and Teissier had supporters and defenders.

In 2015, Teissier unsuccessfully sued the Wikimedia Foundation, claiming that the French Wikipedia article about her damaged her reputation.

== Biography ==
=== Early life ===
Born to a Swiss father and a French mother, she married André Teissier du Cros in 1960 and thus became the daughter-in-law of Janet Teissier du Cros. She gained a Masters in Modern Literature in 1963 and a Bachelor of Arts in Literature in 1992.

=== Career ===
Between 1965 and 1975, she acted in a dozen films, including mainly soft erotic films, but also ones directed by Sydney Pollack (Castle Keep, 1969), Marcel Carné, Philippe de Broca and Yves Robert. She has also worked as a model, notably for Coco Chanel.

In 1968 she became a student of the astrologer Henri Joseph Gouchon on the advice of Federico Fellini. Afterwards, from 1975 to 2009, she had several astrological columns, presented astrology on television, and published pleas for astrology's recognition.

From 1989, she advised the French President, François Mitterrand, who consulted her regularly at the Élysée Palace. Her advice covered both personal matters, such as his health, and matters of state such as the Gulf War and the timing of the Maastricht Treaty referendum. She released transcripts of their recorded conversations four years after his death. For example, he said, "You once told me there were days when it was better to talk, and days when it was better not to talk. When is the next best day for me to speak? Could you check for me?"

=== Filmography ===
- 1966 (uncredited): Qui êtes-vous, Polly Maggoo ?, directed by William Klein
- 1966 (uncredited): Tendre Voyou, directed by Jean Becker
- 1968: Young Wolves (Les Jeunes Loups), directed by Marcel Carné
- 1968: Faites donc plaisir aux amis directed by Francis Rigaud
- 1969: Castle Keep, directed by Sydney Pollack
- 1969: The Blood Rose (La Rose écorchée), directed by Claude Mulot
- 1971: Frustration, ou Les Dérèglements d'une jeune provinciale, directed by José Bénazéraf
- 1972: Le rempart des Béguines, directed by Guy Casaril
- 1972: Rolande met de bles, directed by Roland Verhavert
- 1973: A Slightly Pregnant Man (L'Événement le plus important depuis que l'homme a marché sur la Lune), directed by Jacques Demy
- 1973: Salut l'artiste, directed by Yves Robert
- 1975: L'Incorrigible, directed by Philippe de Broca

=== Television astrology shows ===
From 1975 to 1983, she hosted a series of television shows making astrological predictions:

- From 16 July 1975 to 15 February 1976: Astralement vôtre or Interlude astral, daily broadcast on Antenne 2 (now France 2).
- 1978–1979: Au Bonheur des astres, weekly show on Antenne 2
- 1979–1980: La Légende des Ciels, weekly show on Antenne 2
- 1980–1983: Astro Show: on ARD in Germany.

== Astrological predictions ==
According to Teissier, her predictions have a success rate of 80% to 90%. She claims to have predicted events such as the shooting of Ronald Reagan, Black Monday and the fall of the Berlin Wall.

The Circle Zététique of Languedoc-Roussillon, via a test conducted at the University of Nice from April 2000 to January 2001, argued that her predictions and random predictions by a computer yielded identical results.

A team compared twenty-two forecasts made by Élizabeth Teissier for 2000 to twenty-two forecasts by a group using a common sense reasoning, and twenty-two forecasts made by using a computer to choose random dates. The target was a minimum of 16 successes for Teissier (73%).

Results:

- Random choice: 8 successes
- Teissier: 7 successes
- Common sense: 7 successes.

The experiment concluded that there was no evidence of Élizabeth Teissier having any particular gift, with common-sense predictions or even random chance having equivalent results.

=== Cancer prediction claims ===
Teissier sparked controversy and denunciation in September 2007 when she said, in an interview with the Swiss daily newspaper Le Matin, that "in an astrological chart, you can see if you have a predisposition to cancer, and the type of cancer in question" and that "astrology has never killed anyone, unlike medicine".

== Sociology thesis ==
On 7 April 2001, Elizabeth Teissier defended her thesis entitled Situation épistémologique de l'astrologie à travers l'ambivalence fascination-rejet dans les sociétés postmodernes ("The Epistemological Situation of Astrology in Relation to the Ambivalent Fascination/Rejection of Postmodern Societies"). Her studies at the University of Paris Descartes (a member of the Sorbonne University alliance), were under the supervision of Michel Maffesoli, an Emeritus Professor of Sociology. The central idea of the thesis was described by The New York Times as being that astrology is being oppressed by science, which Teissier called "official science" and "monolithic thought". Teissier argued, however, that her work is devoid of bias and had "focused only on the misunderstanding that astrology as a multimillennial knowledge vehicle" provokes. Her prepared statement was enthusiastically received by her supporters, but there was also a declaration from the editor-in-chief of Science et Vie Junior that what was occurring was a "farce". At end of the defense, the jury deliberated only briefly before Serge Moscovici admitted Teissier to her doctoral degree with the "very honourable" distinction.

The decision to award Teissier's doctorate was controversial, and several sociologists also publicly challenged its legitimacy. The university was criticised for granting the degree, as was the jury, along with Teissier's statements in support of astrology as a science.

A petition signed by over 370 sociologists was sent to Professor Pierre Daumard, the President of the university; he responded that Teissier had complied with all university requirements and it is not his place to question the "guarantees of the scientific validity of the thesis" from the independent jury. Daumard also defended that astrology is a legitimate subject for sociological study for its impact on society, However, a group organised by the Association Française pour l'Information Scientifique (AFIS) described it as "not a thesis in sociology but actually pro-astrological advocacy". They concluded that Teissier's work did not meet the requirements of scientific rigor of doctoral research, regardless of the discipline in question.

== Lawsuit against the Wikimedia Foundation ==
In July 2015, Teissier sued the Wikimedia Foundation, saying the article about her on the French Wikipedia damaged her reputation, and required her to have the right of response. She lost the original trial and appeal. In June 2016, The Court of Appeal in Paris dismissed the case, stating that the Wikimedia Foundation had a technical role of hosting provider, and was thus not involved in the content, and that the remarks about Teissier fell within the limits of free criticism.

== Bibliography ==
- Ne brûlez pas la sorcière, Pauvert, 1970. OCLC 3274316
- Astralement vôtre : le triomphe d'une vocation, Laffont, 1980. ISBN 9782221005477
- Astrologie, passion, Hachette, 1992. ISBN 9782010190599
- with Henri Laborit Étoiles et molécules, Grasset, 1992. ISBN 9782246463412
- Les Douze Signes du zodiaque, Edition 1, 1993. OCLC 492058661
- Vos étoiles jusqu'en l'an 2001 : la conjoncture mondiale et votre horoscope année par année, Edition 1, 1993. ISBN 9782863915417
- Les étoiles de l'Elysée : astro-portraits, Edition 1, 1995. ISBN 9782863916629
- Sous le signe de Mitterrand, Edition 1, 1997. ISBN 9782863918005
- Le passage de tous les dangers : 1999–2004: à l'aube du troisième millénaire, un survol des influx cosmiques pour vous et pour le monde, Laffont, 1999. ISBN 9782221089262
- L'homme d'aujourd'hui et les astres : fascination et rejet, Plon, 2001. ISBN 9782259196185
- Votre horoscope 2009, XO, 2008. ISBN 9782845633872
- with Gerhard Hynek 2012–2016 : cinq années qui vont changer le monde, XO, 2011. ISBN 9782845635340
- Est-il votre Mars ? Est-elle votre Vénus ? : petit traité ludique de l'amour et de l'amitié, XO, 2013. ISBN 9782845636040
