= Electromagnetic hypersensitivity =

Claimed sensitivity to electromagnetic fields

- Idiopathic environmental intolerance attributed to electromagnetic fields (IEI-EMF), Electrohypersensitivity (EHS), Electro-sensitivity, Electrical sensitivity (ES), Wi-Fi allergy

Pseudomedical diagnosis
- Risks: Nocebo

Electromagnetic hypersensitivity (EHS) is a claimed sensitivity to electromagnetic fields, to which adverse symptoms are attributed. EHS has no scientific basis and is not a recognized medical diagnosis. It is associated with a "variety of non-specific symptoms, which afflicted individuals attribute to exposure to electromagnetic fields". It is generally accepted that such symptoms are in fact of psychosomatic origin. Attempts to justify the claim that EHS is caused by exposure to electromagnetic fields have amounted to pseudoscience.

Those self-diagnosed with EHS report adverse reactions to electromagnetic fields at intensities well below the maximum levels permitted by international radiation safety standards. Provocation trials have found that such claimants are unable to distinguish between exposure and non-exposure to electromagnetic fields. A systematic review of medical research in 2011 found no convincing scientific evidence for symptoms being caused by electromagnetic fields. Since then, several double-blind experiments have shown that people who report electromagnetic hypersensitivity are unable to detect the presence of electromagnetic fields and are as likely to report ill health following a sham exposure as they are following exposure to genuine electromagnetic fields, suggesting the cause in these cases is the nocebo effect.

As of 2005, the WHO recommended that claims of EHS be clinically evaluated to determine and rule out alternative diagnoses for suffered symptoms. Cognitive behavioral therapy and management of comorbid psychiatric disorders may help manage the condition.

Some people who feel they are sensitive to electromagnetic fields may seek to reduce their exposure or use alternative medicine. Government agencies have enforced false advertising claims against companies selling devices to shield against EM radiation.

== Signs and symptoms ==
No specific symptoms are associated with claims of EHS, and the reported symptoms range widely among individuals. They include headache, fatigue, stress, sleep disturbances, skin prickling, burning sensations, rashes, and achy or painful muscles. In severe cases, such symptoms can be a disabling problem for the affected person, causing psychological distress. There is no scientific basis to link such symptoms to electromagnetic field exposure.

The prevalence of some reported symptoms is geographically or culturally dependent and does not imply "a causal relationship between symptoms and attributed exposure". Many such reported symptoms overlap with other syndromes known as symptom-based conditions, functional somatic syndromes, and IEI (idiopathic environmental intolerance).

Those reporting electromagnetic hypersensitivity usually describe different levels of susceptibility to electric fields, magnetic fields, and various frequencies of electromagnetic waves. Devices implicated include fluorescent and low-energy lights, mobile, cordless/portable phones, and Wi-Fi. A 2001 survey found that people self-diagnosing as EHS related their symptoms most frequently to cell sites (74%), followed by mobile phones (36%), cordless phones (29%), and power lines (27%). Surveys of people with EHS have found no consistent pattern to these symptoms.

== Causes ==
Most blinded conscious provocation studies have failed to show a correlation between exposure and symptoms. An example is a 2007 study where 17 individuals who showed symptoms in an open test were exposed variously to real mobile phones or sham ones. The individuals showed discomfort with the mobile phones regardless of whether the phones were genuine. These results suggest that psychological mechanisms play a role in causing or exacerbating EHS symptoms. In 2010, Rubin et al. published a follow-up to their 2005 review, bringing the totals to 46 double-blind experiments and 1175 people with self-diagnosed EHS. Neither review found robust evidence to support the hypothesis that electromagnetic exposure causes EHS, nor have other studies. They also concluded that the studies supported the role of the nocebo effect in triggering acute symptoms in those with EHS.

== Diagnosis ==
Electromagnetic hypersensitivity is not an accepted diagnosis; medically, there is no case definition or clinical practice guideline and no test to identify it, nor is there an agreed-upon definition with which to conduct clinical research.

Complaints of electromagnetic hypersensitivity may mask organic or psychiatric illness: in a recent psychological model of mental disorder, Sébastien Point proposed to consider it as a specific phobia. Diagnosing those underlying conditions involves investigating and identifying possible medical causes of the symptoms. It may require a thorough medical evaluation to identify and treat any specific conditions that may be responsible for the symptoms, and a psychological evaluation to identify alternative psychiatric/psychological conditions that may be responsible or contribute to the symptoms.

Symptoms may also be brought on by imagining that exposure is causing harm, an example of the nocebo effect. Studies have shown that reports of symptoms are more closely associated with the belief that one is being exposed than with actual exposure.

== Management ==
Whatever the cause of symptoms attributed to EHS, it can be a debilitating condition that benefits from treatment or management. Cognitive behavioral therapy has shown some success helping people cope with the condition.

As of 2005, WHO recommended that people presenting with claims of EHS be evaluated to determine if they have a medical condition that may be causing the symptoms the person is attributing to EHS, that they have a psychological evaluation, and that the person's environment be evaluated for issues like air or noise pollution that may be causing problems.

A variety of pseudoscientific devices are marketed to those who fear that they are being harmed by electromagnetic fields. The US Federal Trade Commission has warned about scams that involve selling products purported to protect against cell phone radiation. In the UK, a product called 5GBioShield was identified by Trading Standards as a "scam" device. Its manufacturers claimed that it could mitigate harms from phone radiation, but British authorities determined that the device was merely a USB drive.

== Prevalence ==
In 1997, before Wi-Fi, Bluetooth and 3G technology, a group of scientists attempted to estimate the number of people reporting "subjective symptoms" from electromagnetic fields for the European Commission. They estimated that electromagnetic sensitivity occurred in "less than a few cases per million of the population" (based on centres of occupational medicine in UK, Italy and France) or up to "a few tenths of a per cent of the population" (based on self-aid groups in Denmark, Ireland and Sweden). In 2005, the UK Health Protection Agency reviewed this and several other studies for prevalence figures and concluded that "the differences in prevalence were at least partly due to the differences in available information and media attention around electromagnetic hypersensitivity that exist in different countries" and that "Similar views have been expressed by other commentators". The authors noted that most of the studies focused on computer monitors (VDUs), as such the "findings cannot apply in full" to other forms of EMF exposure such as radio waves from mobile phones/base stations.

In 2007, a UK survey aimed at a randomly selected group of 20,000 people found a prevalence of 4% for symptoms self-attributed to electromagnetic exposure.

A 2013 study using telephone surveys in Taiwan concluded that the rates of IEI-EMF were in decline within the country, despite previous expectations of a rise in prevalence as electronic devices became more widespread. Rates declined from 13% in 2007 to 5% in 2013. The study also referred to apparent declines in the Netherlands (from 7% in 2009 to 4% in 2011) and in Germany (from 10% in 2009 to 7% in 2013). More women believed themselves to be electromagnetically hypersensitive than men.

In 2021, physicist Sébastien Point noted that the prevalence of electrohypersensitivity is similar to the prevalence of specific phobias as well as the gender ratio (2 electrohypersensitive or phobic women for one electrohypersensitive or phobic man), which, according to him, reinforces the hypothesis that electrohypersensitivity is a new specific phobia.

== Society and culture ==
In 2010, a cell tower operator in South Africa revealed at a public meeting that the tower that nearby residents were blaming for their EHS symptoms had been turned off over six weeks before the meeting, making it a highly unlikely cause of EHS symptoms.

In February 2014, the UK Advertising Standards Authority found that claims of harm from electromagnetic radiation, made in a product advertisement, were unsubstantiated and misleading.

People have sued for damages due to harm claimed from electromagnetic radiation. In 2012, a New Mexico judge dismissed a lawsuit in which a person sued his neighbor, claiming to have been harmed by EM radiation from his neighbor's cordless telephones, dimmer switches, chargers, Wi-Fi, and other devices. The plaintiff brought the testimony of his doctor, who also believed she had EHS, and a person who represented himself as a neurotoxicologist; the judge found none of their testimony credible. In 2015, parents of a boy at a school in Southborough, Massachusetts, alleged that the school's Wi-Fi was making the boy sick.

In November 2015, a depressed teenage girl in England died by suicide. This act was attributed to EHS by her parents and taken up by tabloids and EHS advocates.

The public position of the EU's Scientific Committee on Emerging and Newly Identified Health Risks (SCENIHR) to the European Commission is that "new improved studies on the association between radio frequency fields from broadcast transmitters and childhood cancer provide evidence against such an association." But "data on the health effects of intermediate frequency fields used, for example, in metal detectors or anti-theft devices in shops, are still lacking." The SCENIHR called for research to continue.

Some people who feel they are sensitive to electromagnetic fields self-treat by trying to reduce their exposure to electromagnetic sources by disconnecting or removing electrical devices, shielding or screening their selves or their residences, and alternative medicine. In Sweden, some municipalities provide disability grants to people who claim to have EHS to have abatement work done in their homes, even though the public health authority does not recognize EHS as an actual medical condition; towns in Halland do not provide such funds and this decision was challenged and upheld in court.

The United States National Radio Quiet Zone is an area where wireless signals are restricted for scientific research purposes, and some people who believe they have EHS have relocated there to seek relief.

Gro Harlem Brundtland, former prime minister of Norway and Director general of the World Health Organization, claims to have EHS. In 2015, she said that she had been sensitive for 25 years.

The 2022 documentary Electric Malady examines the life of a Swedish man who claims to have EHS.

The crime drama television series Better Call Saul, the prequel to Breaking Bad, features the character Chuck McGill, who claims to have EHS. McGill lives without electricity, his house lit by gas lamps, and his apparent reactions to electrical currents play a part in the story. It is eventually revealed that his illness is psychosomatic.

== See also ==
- Wireless electronic devices and health
- Electromagnetic radiation and health
- Bioelectromagnetics – the study of the interaction between electromagnetic fields and biological entities
- Microwave auditory effect
- List of questionable diseases
- Radiophobia – the fear of ionizing radiation, originating in the early 1900s
- Wind turbine syndrome
- Tinfoil hat – a popular stereotype and slang term for paranoia, persecutory delusions, pseudoscience, and conspiracy theories
- Havana Syndrome
