= Evry Schatzman =

French astronomer (1920–2010)

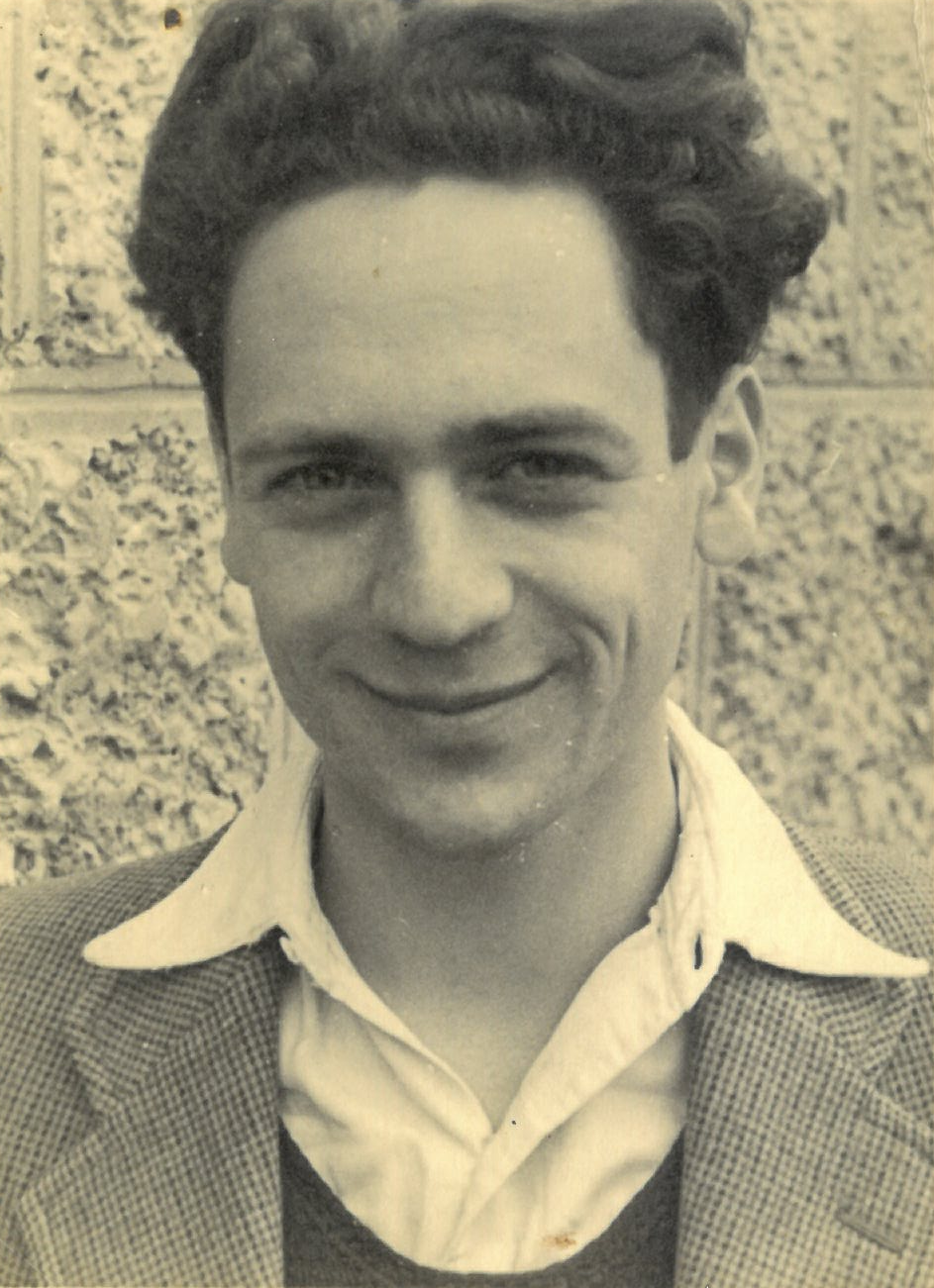
- Schatzman in 1943
- Born: 16 September 1920; Neuilly-sur-Seine, France
- Died: 25 April 2010 (aged 89); Paris, France
- Citizenship: French
- Education: École normale supérieure University of Paris
- Spouse: Ruth Fischer
- Children: Michelle Schatzman
- Awards: CNRS Gold Medal
- Scientific career
- Fields: Astrophysics

Evry Léon Schatzman (16 September 1920 – 25 April 2010) was a French scientist hailed as "the father of modern French astrophysics".

== Background ==
Schatzman was born in Romanian-Jewish family. His father, Benjamin Schatzman, was a dentist born in Tulcea, Romania, and emigrated at a young age with his family to Palestine. Schatzman began his studies at the École normale supérieure in November 1939. After the German invasion of France, Schatzman fled occupied France, arriving in Lyon in January 1942. He worked there for a year and then moved to Haute-Provence Observatory where he hid under the pseudonym Antoine Emile Louis Sellier.

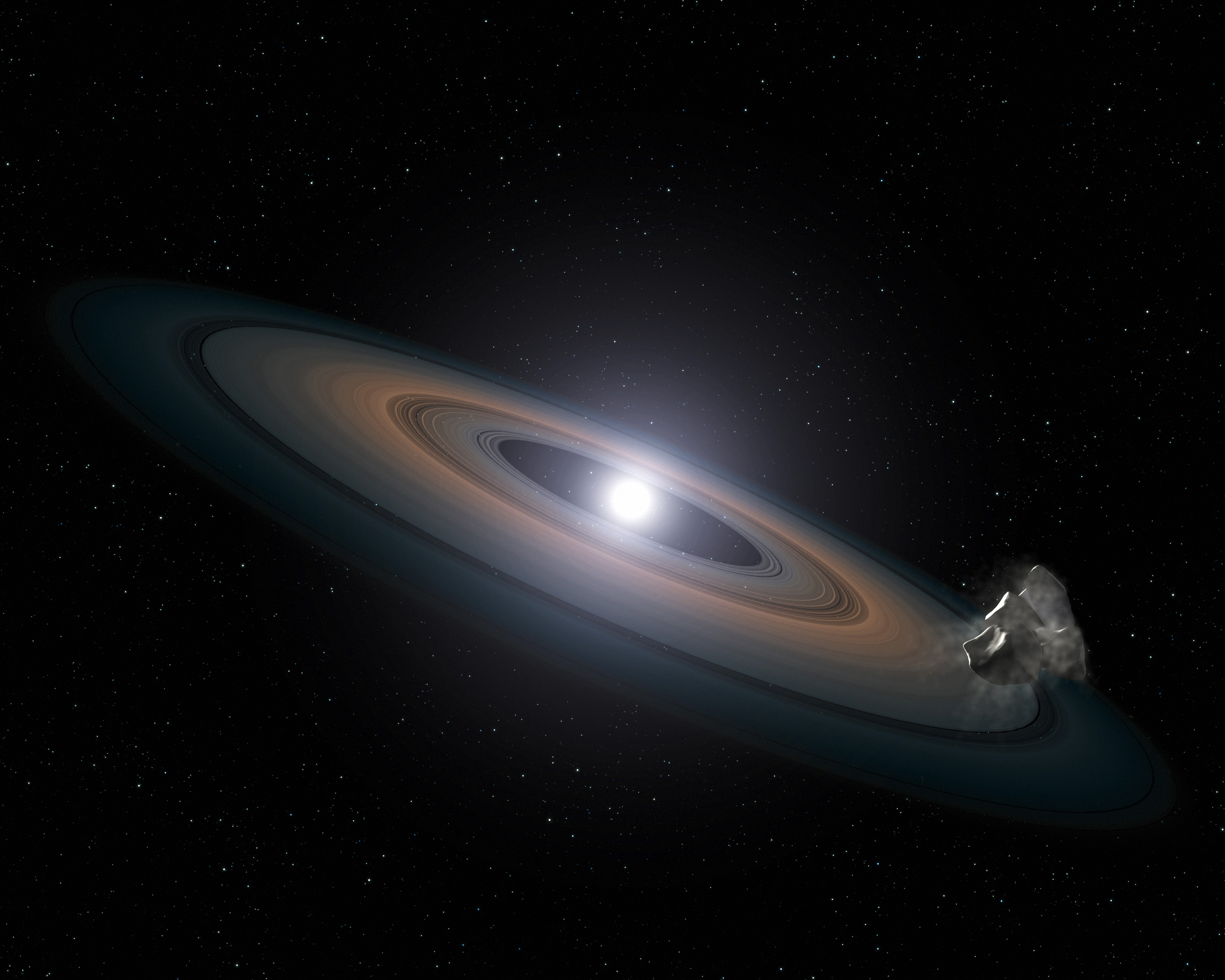
Artist's impression of debris around a white dwarf

== Career ==
He was appointed by the Centre national de la recherche scientifique (CNRS) in autumn 1945 and received his doctorate in March 1946. He taught at Princeton University and the Copenhagen Observatory. He was mentored during his year at Princeton by Lyman Spitzer and Martin Schwarzschild and works with Bengt Strömgren in Copenhagen.

He started teaching at the University of Paris in 1949, where he remained for 27 years, creating the first astrophysics chair in France. He worked for a long time at the Institut d'Astrophysique, a CNRS organization built in the garden side of l'Observatoire. During this period Schatzman also taught at the Université libre de Bruxelles (English: Free University of Brussels). Schatzman became an associate professor at the University of Paris in 1954.

He founded an astrophysics laboratory in Meudon in 1964, then in 1976 he moved to Nice Observatory, where he eventually became a full researcher. Schatzman retired in the fall of 1989.

His daughter, mathematician Michelle Schatzman, was born in 1949.

== White dwarfs and wave heating ==
Schatzman worked on white dwarfs during the 1940s. He realized that the atmospheres of white dwarfs should be gravitationally stratified, with hydrogen on top and heavier elements below,^{, §5–6} and explained pressure ionization in white dwarf atmospheres. He was one of the proponents of the wave heating theory of the solar corona. Schatzman proposed the mechanism of magnetic braking, by which outflows slow down the stellar rotation.

Schatzman wrote the astrophysics textbook Astrophysique Générale and contributed greatly to the popularity of astrophysics in France. He received the Prix Jules Janssen of the Société astronomique de France (French Astronomical Society) in 1973, the Holweck Prize in 1985, and the Gold Medal of the CNRS in 1983. He became a member of the French Academy of Sciences in 1985.

The CNRS recognized Schatzman as "the father of modern French astrophysics".

== Skepticism and political involvement ==
Schatzman advocated throughout his career for better science education to the general public. He was Chairperson of the Union rationaliste from 1970 to 2001. In 1992 the Committee for Skeptical Inquiry (CSICOP) presented him with their Distinguished Skeptic Award. He criticized science communicators who legitimized pseudo-scientific beliefs, such as Hubert Reeves.

He was a member of the Communist Party after the war. He left in 1959, in protest over Stalin's heavy-handed regime. He led a teachers' union from 1953 to 1957 and was active with the World Federation of Scientific Workers.

== Selected works ==
- Origine et évolution des mondes, Paris: A. Michel, 1957. Translated into Spanish by Raquel Rabiela de Gortari and Arcadio Poveda as Origen y evolución del universo, México: UNAM, 1960; translated into English by Bernard and Annabel Pagel as The origin and evolution of the universe, New York: Basic Books, 1965.
- White Dwarfs, Amsterdam: North-Holland, 1958.
- (with Jean-Claude Pecker) Astrophysique Générale, Paris: Masson, 1959.
- Our Expanding Universe, New York: McGraw–Hill, 1992, ISBN 0-07-055174-X.
- (with Françoise Praderie) Les Etoiles, Paris: Paris Interéditions et ed. du CNRS, 1990, ISBN 2-7296-0299-2. Translated into English by A. R. King as The Stars, Berlin: Springer, 1993, ISBN 3-540-54196-9.
