= Comité Para =

Belgian skeptic organization

Comité belge pour l'Analyse Critique des parasciences
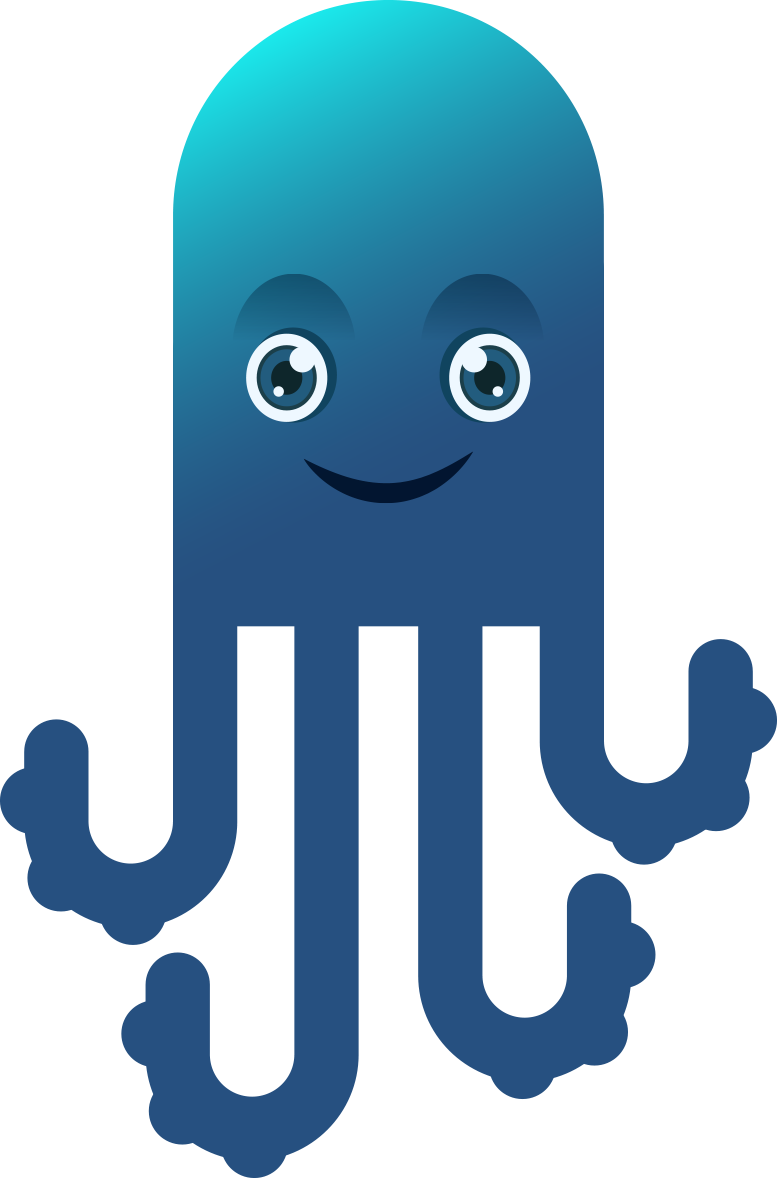
- Abbreviation: Comité Para
- Formation: 1949
- Type: Nonprofit organisation
- Purpose: Scientific investigation of paranormal claims
- Location: Brussels, Belgium
- Region served: French-speaking Belgium
- President: Alice Van Helden
- Website: comitepara.be

The Comité Para, in full Comité belge pour l'Analyse Critique des parasciences (from French: "Belgian Committee for the Critical Analysis of Parasciences"), is a francophone-Belgian non-profit organisation of skeptics. Founded in 1949, the Comité Para regards itself as the originator of the modern skeptical movement. The group's motto (by Robert Rendu) is Ne rien nier a priori, ne rien affirmer sans preuve ("Do not deny anything a priori, do not assert anything without evidence").

"Comité Para" originally stood for Comité Belge pour l'Investigation Scientifique des Phénomènes Réputés Paranormaux ("Belgian Committee for Scientific Investigation of Purported Paranormal Phenomena") until it adopted its present name on 19 June 2014.

== History ==
Challenging paranormal phenomena began long before the foundation of the Comité Para. For example, in the 19th century the debate raged about spiritism and the existence of spirits. The illusionist Harry Houdini (1874–1926) is seen by skeptics as a debunker of mediums, and therefore regarded as one of the founding fathers of the modern skeptical movement.

Discussion to form a committee that would regularly perform experiments with scientific controls to assess extraordinary claims originated in January 1947, after a group of academics was challenged to prove the validity of radiesthesia (the results were negative). The organisation was eventually founded by seventeen members including astronomer Sylvain Arend on 15 January 1949, and officially registered as an association without lucrative purpose on 4 June 1949. It emerged in part as a response to a pressing consumer protection problem in the aftermath of the Second World War: a predatory industry of bogus psychics was selling false hope to the grieving relatives of people who had gone missing during the war. The Comité Para tried to combat clairvoyants, astrologers, dowsers etc. American philosopher Paul Kurtz was inspired by the Comité Para to found the Committee for the Scientific Investigation of Claims of the Paranormal in the United States in 1976 after the debate around the Mars effect (that allegedly proved astrological influences). This made that the organised modern skeptical movement became an international one, and also gave a new impulse to scientific skepticism in Belgium. The Comité was formally bilingual, but after a sleeping existence it was revived by almost exclusively French-speaking members, most of them astronomers. When in 1976 teacher Jean-Marie Gantois founded the working group Prometheus within the Dutch-speaking Society for Astronomy (VVS), that besides astrology and ufology also began taking on other pseudosciences during the 1980s, discussion rose whether Prometheus was still compatible with the aims of the VVS. One proposal was to integrate the entire working group into the Comité Para, of which several people already had a membership, but the Comité concluded that founding a separate Dutch-speaking would be a better solution. This gave rise to the Flemish SKEPP as a sister society of the Comité in 1990.

Represented by Arlette Fougnies, the Comité Para became a founding member of the European Council of Skeptical Organisations (ECSO) in 1994.

== Members ==
- Jean Champenois is a former spirit medium who became an illusionist and skeptic, in the line of Harry Houdini, James Randi and also Gérard Majax. Currently he organises skeptic conferences in this domain. He uses his talents as a magician to imitate the techniques mediums utilise to convince their audience that they can contact the dead.
- Jean Dommanget (1924–2014) was an astronomer and long-time president of the Comité, who took the lead in many astrology and dowsing experiments.
- Jacques Van Rillaer is the author of Les Illusions de la Psychanalyse (1980) and co-author Le Livre Noir de la psychanalyse (2005), criticising the theories of Sigmund Freud as pseudoscientific.

== See also ==
- SKEPP
- Het Denkgelag
- List of skeptical organizations

== Publications ==
- Comité Para (Ed.) (2005). La science face au défi du paranormal. Brussels: Relie-Art.
- Nouvelles Sceptiques (until 2009 named Nouvelles Brèves), fanzine destined for members.
