= Zététique =

Scientific method applied to paranormal claims

Zététique (from Ancient Greek: ζητητικός zētētikós, "inquisitive", "keen") is the application of the scientific method when investigating allegations of paranormal phenomena. The term is widely used by the modern French skeptical movement for self-identification, and is similar to scientific skepticism. The movement also aims to examine pseudoscience and to promote critical thinking.

== Etymology ==
Zététique seems to have entered the French language around the 17th century. The oldest known reference is found in the Dictionnaire des Arts et des sciences (1694), II, p. 615, wherein the Methode zetetique is the method to resolve a mathematical problem. In the Littré dictionary of 1872, zététique is referred to as an educational term about research, especially as a method to resolve a mathematical problem, and in general a method to "penetrate the reason of things". Philosophes zététiques are described as "ancient philosophers who doubted everything." The 1876 Larousse dictionary, p. 1479, wrote thus:

The name of zététiques, which means seekers, indicates a rather original nuance of skepticism: it is provisional skepticism, it is close to Descartes' idea about doubt as a means, not as an end, as a preliminary procedure, not as a definitive result. If all skeptics really were zététiques and only zététiques, they would have said with Pyrrho: "We do not arrive at doubt, but at the suspension of judgement" ... skeptics literally mean examiners, people who think, reflect, study attentively; but in the long run they take a more negative than doubtful stance, and has meant that those who are under the pretext of always examining never decide. ... the word zététiques is not made to resolve the debate between the two meanings of all these terms ... Moreover, the name zététiques has remained on the ground of the school that created it; and, despite its wide expansion, which would have helped make the term general for all seekers of truth in all fields, it is exclusively applied to skeptics, and we could even say to Greek skeptics or Pyrrhonists.

Physics professor Henri Broch, who ran the International Zetetic Challenge (1987–2002) with Gérard Majax and Jacques Theodor, and in 1998 founded the Laboratoire de Zététique at the University of Nice Sophia Antipolis, defines zététique simply as "the art of doubt".

== Zététique organisations ==
Past and current organisations that consider themselves zététique include:

- Laboratoire de Zététique, attached to the University of Nice Sophia Antipolis, founded by professor Henri Broch in 1998, closed since 2015.
  - Centre d'Analyse Zététique, an association that proposes conferences in Nice.
  - International Zetetic Challenge (défi zététique international), from 1987 until 2002 run by Henri Broch, Gérard Majax and Jacques Theodor, since 1998 in collaboration with the Laboratoire de Zététique.
- Observatoire Zététique, a non-profit organisation in Grenoble, founded in 2003.
- Cercle Zététique (CZ), a non-profit organisation founded in 1994 in Metz, later moved to Paris. Paul-Eric Blanrue was its president until 2003, Patrick Berger succeeded him until the association was dissolved in 2005.
- Cercle Zététique Languedoc-Roussillon (CZLR), a non-profit organisation founded in 1996 as a regional branch of the CZ, but went on independently from 2000 onwards.
- Cercle de Zététique de l'association Aldéran de Toulouse.

=== In English ===
Marcello Truzzi and others who are critical of the modern skeptical movement often call themselves zetetic as a rendering of Zététique in English because they wish to use a different word to distinguish themselves from other skeptics. The first few issues of the Skeptical Inquirer, of which Truzzi was the first editor, it was titled The Zetetic.
