= The Blood Rose =

1970 film

- Film poster for The Blood Rose
- Directed by: Claude Mulot
- Written by: Claude Mulot; Jean Larriaga; Edgar Oppenheimer
- Starring: Anny Duperey; Philippe Lemaire; Howard Vernon
- Cinematography: Roger Fellous
- Edited by: Monique Kirsanoff
- Production company: Transatlantic Productions
- Distributed by: Allied Artists
- Release date: September 25, 1970 (France)
- Running time: 95 minutes
- Country: France

The Blood Rose (French: La Rose écorchée, lit. 'The Flayed Rose') is a 1970 French horror film directed and co-written by Claude Mulot.

The film involves a portraitist named Frederick Lansac (Philippe Lemaire) wanting to restore his wife Anne's (Anny Duperey) face to its former beauty after it was disfigured in an accident. Lansac tries to force a surgeon named Rohmer (Howard Vernon) to perform a transplant on her.

== Plot ==
Frederick Lansac is a botanist and portraitist who runs a beauty salon. Lansac meets and falls in love with Anne at a dress ball and the two get married. The two move into Lansac's home but at one of Lansac's portrait exhibitions, Anne's face is pushed into a bonfire by a jealous woman which horribly scars Anne's face. Anne isolates herself in her home where she slowly becomes less mentally stable as well as having erotic dreams about her nurse Agnès. Lansac learns that one of his clients, Dr. Rohmer is a former plastic surgeon who has halted from practicing medicine and currently only performs plastic surgery on criminals. Lansac blackmails Rohmer into performing a grafting surgery on his wife to restore her former beauty. Lansac tricks two of his female clients to his home to become the donors for his wife's new face but the two die in the process. Barbara (Élizabeth Teissier), the sister of Anne's former nurse comes to the chateau to look for her sibling, but finds Anne who demands to have her face. Barbara manages to escape and Rohmer commits suicide. Realizing how far his wife has grown into madness, Lansac has his wife killed by his servants and then gives himself up to the police.

== Cast ==
- Anny Duperey as Anne
- Philippe Lemaire as Frédéric
- Howard Vernon as Röhmer
- Gérard Huart as Wilfrid Lansac
- Élizabeth Teissier as Moïra
- Olivia Robin as Barbara
- Michèle Perello as Agnès
- Valérie Boisgel as Catherine
- Jean-Pierre Honoré as Paul
- Jacques Seiler as Inspector Dorsay

== Production ==
The film was shot between May 8, 1969, and June 2, 1969. The film is one of the many unofficial remakes of the film Eyes Without a Face. Other unofficial remakes include The Awful Dr. Orloff and Corruption.

== Release ==
The Blood Rose opened in France on September 25, 1970. The film was shown in the United States in Detroit on October 28, 1970. The film had scenes involving lesbianism that were cut for its American theatrical release.

The film was released on DVD by Mondo Macabro in 2007.

== Notes ==
=== References ===
- The American Film Institute Catalog of Motion Pictures Produced in the United States: Film beginnings, 1893-1910. (2v.). University of California Press. 1997. ISBN 0520209702.
- Smith, Richard Harland. "Home Video Reviews". Turner Classic Movies. Archived from the original on April 7, 2016.
