= Sébastien Point =

French researcher, engineer and physicist (born 1982)

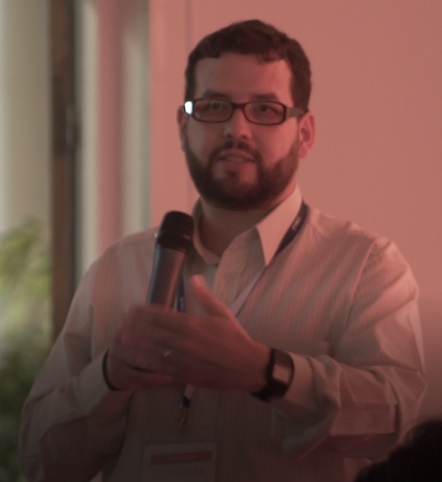
- Sébastien Point in 2017
- Born: July 11, 1982 (age 43); Digne-les-Bains, France
- Occupations: physicist, engineer

Sébastien Point (born 11 July 1982 in Digne-les-Bains) is a French physicist, engineer, researcher and specialist in science and technology who specialises in lighting with a particular focus on the biological and health effects of blue light. (Note: As an example: Point, Sébastien. "Champs magnétiques, champs électromagnétiques et santé" (PDF). Paris Sciences et Lettres Research University (in French): 125–128.) (Note: As an example: Point, Sebastien; Boulenguez, Pierre; Martinsons, Christophe; Carre, Samuel; Torriglia, Alicia; Jaadane, Imene; Behar-Cohenz, Francine; Savoldelliz, Michele; Jonetz, Laurent; Chahory, Sabine; Dore, Jean-Francois (2014-10-15). "Proceedings of the colloquium on the biological and health effects of non-ionizing radiations; Actes du colloque sur les effets biologiques et sanitaires des rayonnements non ionisants" (in French).)

As well as being involved in lighting research, Point is the president of the non-ionizing radiation section of the French Society for Radiation Protection (SFRP).

Point is also associated with Collectif science-technologie-action (transl. Science-Technology-Action Collective), which promotes technology in society.

== Popular science writing ==
Point is on the editorial board of the journal Science et pseudo-sciences, published by the French Association for Scientific Information, and writes a skeptical column for it.

He is also an author for the online journal The European scientist, and for the English skeptical journal Skeptical Inquirer.

== Positions and controversies ==
Point is known for his criticism of alternative medicine and has publicly denounced speeches he considered "alarmist" on electromagnetic waves; (Note: As an example: Point, De Sébastien (2018-03-02). "Electromagnetic waves and health: when lawyers think they are physicists". European Scientist.) including concerns about the retinal exposure to artificial lighting when it is rich in blue light, and questioned the relevance of research on rats to human beings. He also argued against "anti-wave" and "anti-blue light" devices which he considered unnecessary and even dangerous, while underlining the potential danger of alternative therapies based on prolonged observation of intense light sources.

He disputed the danger of 5G, and promoted its development, arguing that it will allow major technological and societal advances such as autonomous vehicles or connected factories.

Responding to MEP Michèle Rivasi's views against certain radiofrequencies, namely the non-ionizing radiation used by 5G, during the 2019 European elections, he stated that there is no proof of cancer, and nothing to fear from the mobile phone waves calling it a political logic propagating "a fear based on a subject difficult to access" and "a manipulation of minds".

In May 2019, he expressed concerns about the methodology in articles used by the National Agency for Food, Environmental and Occupational Health Safety (ANSES) to affirm the dangerousness of the blue light emitted by some LEDs.

In July 2019 Point criticized Petit Bateau for their marketing of “anti-wave caps” for children calling it an irresponsible marketing strategy, a position shared by several other scientists including Anne Perrin who is also a member of the SFRP.

His positions on the absence of harmfulness of electromagnetic waves has been criticized by its detractors including Paul Héroux, professor at the Faculty of Medicine of McGill University and director of the occupational health program who explained that "all of these waves have, for years, proven effects on the health of living beings". Point's model of considering electrohypersensitivity as a phobia was published in Skeptical Inquirer and Physics in Canada and he claims his model is consistent with the demography of electrohypersensitivity which is similar to the demography of specific phobias.

In 2021 Point denounced the recommendation formulated by the OPECST, then chaired by the mathematician and deputy Cédric Villani, to recognize the study of the effects of electromagnetic fields of biology to address certain health issues in the agricultural world, calling it a "charlatan network" and "a profitable business which seems to find political relays".

== Distinctions ==
- Medal of the French Society of Radiation Protection obtained in recognition of the work of informing the public on the retinal risk in blue light.

== Books ==
=== In English ===
Electrohypersensitivity The New Belief: How media and associations made the electrohypersensitives, 2021 (independently edited). (ISBN 979-8781173136)

=== In French ===
- Point, Sébastien (1997). Le contrat non-écrit (in French). Le Livre Régionaliste.
- Point, Sébastien (2006). Lampes toxiques: des croyances à la réalité scientifique. Book-e-Book editions.
- Perrin, Anne; Souques, Martine (2010-01-01). Champs électromagnétiques, environnement et santé. ISBN 978-2-8178-0133-9.
- Point, Sebastien (2019-01-01). "Lumière bleue: l'homme est-il fait comme un rat?" (in French). Editions Techniques de l'Ingenieur – via INIS.
- Point, Sébastien (2019-07-29). Lumière bleue: éclairage à LED et écrans menacent-ils notre santé?.
- Point, Sébastien (2021-10-19). Chroniques d'un Enfant Damné (in French). Independently Published. ISBN 979-8-4997-5614-0. (independently edited).
- Point, Sébastien (2021-11-10). La religion anti-ondes: Comment médias et associations ont fabriqué les électrosensibles. (independently edited).
