= Association française pour l'information scientifique =

Organization of European skeptics

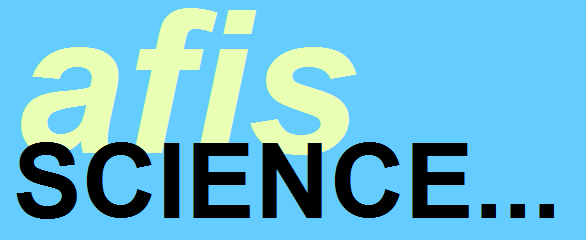
- Abbreviation: AFIS
- Formation: November 1968; 58 years ago
- Type: Nonprofit organisation
- Purpose: Furthering scientific literacy and scientific skepticism
- Headquarters: 4 Rue des Arènes 75005
- Location: Paris
- Region served: France
- Members: 700 (2010)
- President: Jean-Jacques Ingremeau
- Affiliations: European Council of Skeptical Organisations
- Website: pseudo-sciences.org Pronunciation of 'Association française pour l'information scientifique'

The Association française pour l'information scientifique or AFIS (English: French Association for Scientific Information) is an association regulated by the French law of 1901, founded under the leadership of Michel Rouzé in November 1968. As a skeptical organisation, it has been a member of the European Council of Skeptical Organisations since 2001, and publishes the magazine Science et pseudo-sciences ("Science and pseudosciences").

== Purpose ==
Statement of principles: "The AFIS strives to promote science against those who deny its cultural value, abuse it for criminal purposes or as a cover for quackery." According to the AFIS, science itself cannot solve humanity's problems, nor can one solve them without using the scientific method. Citizens should be informed about scientific and technical advancements and the problems it helps to solve, in a way that is accessible to everyone, regardless of the pressure from particular interests. They should be warned against false sciences and against those who propagate them in the media for personal or financial gain. Via its magazine, Science et pseudo-sciences, the association states it wants:

- to collect a number facts from current affairs in science and technology to consider them from a human perspective first;
- to distribute scientific information about all disciplines of research via the news, in a language that everyone can understand;
- to unconditionally denounce peddlers of false science or pseudoscience (astrology, flying saucers, sects, the "paranormal", fake medicine), malevolent charlatans and suppliers of irrationality;
- to defend scientific thinking against the threat of a new obscurantism.

Independent of all pressure groups, it rejects any concession to sensationalism, disinformation and complacency regarding the irrational.

== Publication ==
AFIS publishes a quarterly magazine Science et pseudo-sciences ("Science and pseudosciences"). According to the association, the magazine had 1400–1500 subscribers and a readership of 1400–2800 per issue in 2010. In 2010, the sale of the magazine delivered a revenue of €82,232 for production costs and €60,125 for postage costs. Engineer and physicist Sébastien Point is a member of AFIS and of the magazine. He has also written for the English magazine Skeptical Inquirer about free energy and chromotherapy, and about wrong beliefs surrounding electromagnetic radiations.

== Controversies ==
=== Astrology ===
When Élizabeth Teissier's dissertation Situation épistémologique de l'astrologie à travers l'ambivalence fascination/rejet dans les sociétés postmodernes ("Epistemological Situation of Astrology across the Ambivalence of Fascination/Rejection in Postmodern Societies") was accepted at the Paris Descartes University in April 2001, it caused an uproar within the scientific community. The AFIS took the initiative to critically analyse Teissier's thesis. It turned out to be a plea for astrology, presented as a sociological study, and did not comply with any academic standards for a dissertation. The analysis was conducted by a group of astrophysicists and astronomers (Jean-Claude Pecker, Jean Audouze and Denis Savoie), sociologists (Bernard Lahire and Philippe Cibois), a philosopher (Jacques Bouveresse) and specialists of pseudosciences (Henri Broch and Jean-Paul Krivine). Teissier rejected the criticism of the contents of her sociological dissertation, and branded the AFIS as the "Taliban of culture."

=== GMOs ===
In 2007, AFIS started a petition against the moratorium of genetically modified maize in France. It published numerous articles on GMOs. It also lobbied in the Senate during the discussion of the law on GMOs in 2008. In March 2008, this position of the association led a member of AFIS' Scientific Council, Marcel-Francis Kahn, emeritus professor in medicine at Paris Diderot University, to resign on the grounds that "the AFIS – without having consulted our opinion – made a 180° turn to a genuine pro-GMO lobby". He also alleged a connection between two members, Marcel Kuntz and Louis-Marie Houdebine, and "Monsanto or its affiliates". However, Kahn was unable to produce "real evidence" to back up these accusations. Meanwhile, the AFIS maintains its "total independence from any industrial group".

=== Global warming ===
After the publication of the report on global warming, including giving a voice to climate change deniers such as Vincent Courtillot and Benoît Rittaud, the association received criticism from climatologists and the Union rationaliste. Sylvestre Huet, science journalist at Libération, expressed his disappointment with the "mediocre" coverage of the topic in a critique of the association. AFIS has repeatedly stated that such accusations are baseless and purely defamatory, coming from people who use guilt by association as their main argument against people who question their own ideological biases. François-Marie Bréon, who was president of AFIS for 5 years, is a climatologist with CEA and has been a member of IPCC.

== Board and ==
=== Presidents ===
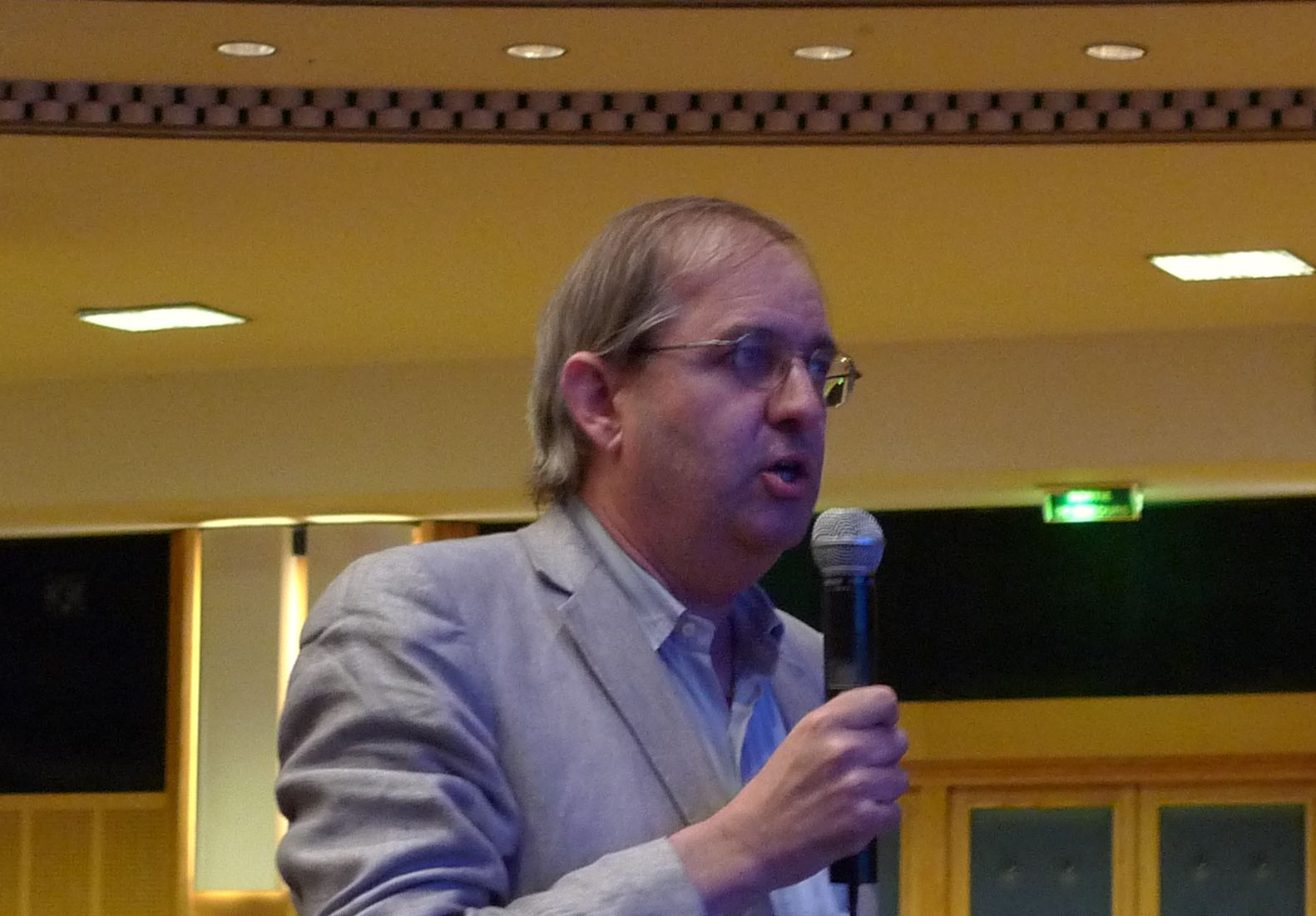
Jean Bricmont, president 2001–2006

- Michel Rouzé (1969–1999)
- Jean-Claude Pecker (1999–2001)
- Jean Bricmont (2001–2006)
- Michel Naud (2006–2011)
- Louis-Marie Houdebine (2011–2014)
- Anne Perrin (2014–2018)
- Roger Lepeix (2018–2019),
- Jean-Paul Krivine (2019–2020),
- François-Marie Bréon (2020–2024)
- Jean-Jacques Ingremeau, since 2024

=== Scientific supervisory committee ===
- Jean-Pierre Adam (archaeologist, CNRS, Paris).
- Alain Aspect (physicist, Nobel Prize 2022)
- Jacques Bouveresse (philosopher, professor at the Collège de France, chair of Philosophy of Language and Cognition).
- Jean Bricmont (professor of theoretical physics, University of Louvain-la-Neuve, Belgium).
- Yves Bréchet (member of the French Academy of Sciences, adjunct professor at McMaster University and Monash University)
- Henri Broch (professor of physics and zetetics, University of Nice Sophia Antipolis).
- Gérald Bronner (professor of sociology, University of Strasbourg).
- Henri Brugère (veterinary doctor, professor de therapeutic physiology at the National Veterinary School of Alfort).
- Yvette Dattée (honorary research director of the INRA, member of the Académie d’Agriculture de France).
- Jean-Paul Delahaye (professor at Lille University of Science and Technology, researcher at Laboratoire d'Informatique Fondamentale de Lille).
- Marc Fellous (professor of medicine, Institut Cochin de Génétique Moléculaire).
- Léon Guéguen (dietician, honorary research director of the INRA, member of the Académie d'agriculture de France).
- Louis-Marie Houdebine (biologist and research director at the centre of the INRA at Jouy-en-Josas).
- Bertrand Jordan (molecular biologist, emeritus research director at CNRS, Marseille).
- Jean-Pierre Kahane (professor of mathematics, member of the French Academy of Sciences).
- Jean de Kervasdoué (professor at the Conservatoire national des arts et métiers (CNAM), member of the French Academy of Technologies).
- Marcel Kuntz (biologist, research director at the CNRS).
- Gilbert Lagrue (honorary professor at the hôpital Albert Chenevier at Créteil).
- Hélène Langevin-Joliot (nuclear physicist, emeritus research director at the CNRS).
- Guillaume Lecointre (professor at the National Museum of Natural History, Paris)
- Jean-Marie Lehn (professor at the Collège de France, member of the French Academy of Sciences, Nobel Prize for Chemistry).
- Gérard Pascal (dietician and toxicologist, honorary research director of the INRA, member of the Académie d’Agriculture and the French Academy of Technologies).
- Jean-Claude Pecker (honorary professor of theoretical astrophysics at the Collège de France, member of the French Academy of Sciences).
- Arkan Simaan (professor agrégé of physics, historian of the sciences).
- Alan Sokal (professor of physics at New York University and professor of mathematics at the University College London).
- Jacques Van Rillaer (professeur de psychologie, Belgique).

=== Editorial staff Science et pseudo-sciences and website ===
- Jean-Paul Krivine (editor-in-chief).
- Bruno Przetakiewicz (webmaster)

=== Transparency ===
In 2008, after the work of the Prometheus Foundation on the transparency barometer of NGOs, the AFIS wanted to participate in a process of transparency by publicising the composition of the board council, the finances and activities reports.
