= Cathy Stewart =

French film actress and pornographic actress

- Born: Catherine Patricia Greiner; 2 April 1956; Royan, France
- Died: 9 August 1994 (aged 38); Breuillet, Charente-Maritime, France
- Other name: Cathy Greiner
- Occupation: Actress
- Years active: 1976–1986

Cathy Stewart (2 April 1956 – 9 August 1994) was a French pornographic actress who appeared in the majority of France's hardcore films between 1976 and the early eighties. She also appeared in several non-pornographic pictures, most notably Jean Rollin's 1980 horror film La Nuit des Traquées where she was credited under her real name (Catherine Greiner).

Suffering from drug addiction, she stopped her acting career in the 1980s, and died from an overdose in August 1994.
