= Science et pseudo-sciences =

French magazine

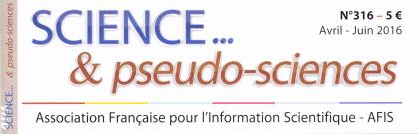
- Editor-in-chief: Jean-Paul Krivine
- Director of publication: Anne Perrin
- Categories: Scientific skepticism, rationalism, zététique
- Frequency: Quarterly
- Circulation: 5000 (2015)
- Publisher: Association française pour l'information scientifique
- First issue: 15 November 1968
- Country: France
- Language: French
- Website: www.pseudo-sciences.org
- ISSN: 0982-4022

Science et pseudo-sciences is a quarterly science magazine issued in France since 1968, it is the press organ of the Association française pour l'information scientifique. It was created by the journalist Michel Rouzé.

According to the association, the magazine had 1400–1500 subscribers and a readership of 1400–2800 per issue in 2010. In 2010, the sale of the magazine delivered a revenue of €82,232 for production costs and €60,125 for postage costs.
