= Arkan Simaan =

Lebanese-French novelist

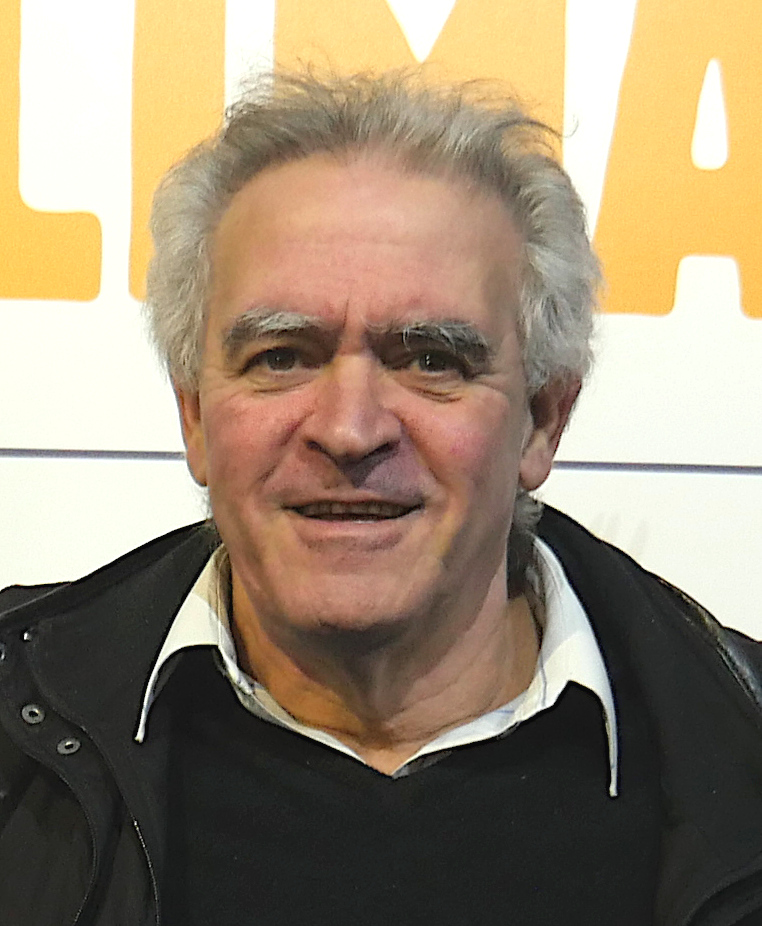
- Simaan in 2015
- Born: 1945 (age 80–81); Lebanon

Arkan Simaan (born 1945) is a Lebanese-French novelist.

== Biography ==
Arkan was born in Lebanon in 1945. When he was two years old, his family immigrated to Brazil and settled in the city of Anápolis near Brasília. The 1964 Brazilian coup d'état overthrew the government of João Goulart just as Simaan had begun studying physics at the University of São Paulo. In response to this, he became a student activist. Sought by the political police and sentenced to jail in absentia, he went underground. His name was then cited in several prosecutions. Forced to flee Brazil, he arrived in Paris in 1970.

After a few years in France, Simaan refrained from activities that were connected with his prior political involvement. In Paris he resumed his studies in physics at the University Paris Diderot. He then attended the Institut Supérieur des Matériaux et de la Construction Mécanique from which he received an engineering degree. Following a short spell in industry, he realized that he wanted to teach, so he obtained the agrégation in physics.

In 2012, he was one of the founders of Planète Amazone, a French non-governmental organization defending indigenous peoples. He took part in the travels in Europe of the chief Raoni Metuktire.

Arkan Simaan is member of the scientific patronage committee of Association Française pour l'Information Scientifique.

== Works ==
All his books were originally written in French, and many of them have won awards.

- (With Joëlle Fontaine) "L'Image du Monde des Babyloniens à Newton" (Adapt Editions, Paris, 1998)
- "Cette sentence vous fait plus peur qu'à moi-même : Giordano Bruno" (Cahiers rationalistes, 2000)
- "La science au péril de sa vie – les aventuriers de la mesure du monde" (Vuibert / Adapt, Paris, 2001.) In 2002 this book was awarded Prize of Special Book in Astronomy (Prix Spécial du livre d'astronomie)
- "Vénus devant le soleil – comprendre et observer un phénomène astronomique" (Vuibert / Adapt, 2003). This book concerns the transit of Venus across the Sun.
- "L'Image du Monde de Newton à Einstein" (Vuibert / Adapt, Paris, 2005)
- "Le paradoxe de la science: Fritz Haber" (Cahiers rationalistes n° 579, November 2005)
- "L'Écuyer d'Henri le Navigateur" (Éditions Harmattan, Paris, 2007)
- "Un marin en Terre des perroquets", (Ancre de marine éditions, Saint-Malo, 2024), 156 p. ISBN 978-2841414789
- Viens, on s’en va ! – Immigration, dictature, exil, Éditions Zinédi, 2025 (Born in Lebanon, the author recounts his immigration to Brazil, his political commitment against the Brazilian dictatorship, his arrest and his exile in France, where he became an associate professor of physics, then an activist for the defense of forests and indigenous peoples).
- Le Neveu de Zacuto (The Nephew of Zacuto), Ancre de Marine, Fiction collection, 2026 (ISBN 978-2-84141-519-9), historical novel. Set in the late fifteenth century, the novel follows Ithamar, a Jewish craftsman and astrolabe maker who is the fictional nephew of the astronomer Abraham Zacuto. Through his journey from Salamanca to Portugal, the narrative explores the Expulsion of Jews from Spain in 1492, forced conversions in Portugal and the persecution of Jewish communities in the Iberian Peninsula. It also addresses the contribution of Jewish scholars to astronomy and navigation during the Age of Discovery.
