= Jean-Paul Delahaye =

French computer scientist and mathematician (born 1952)

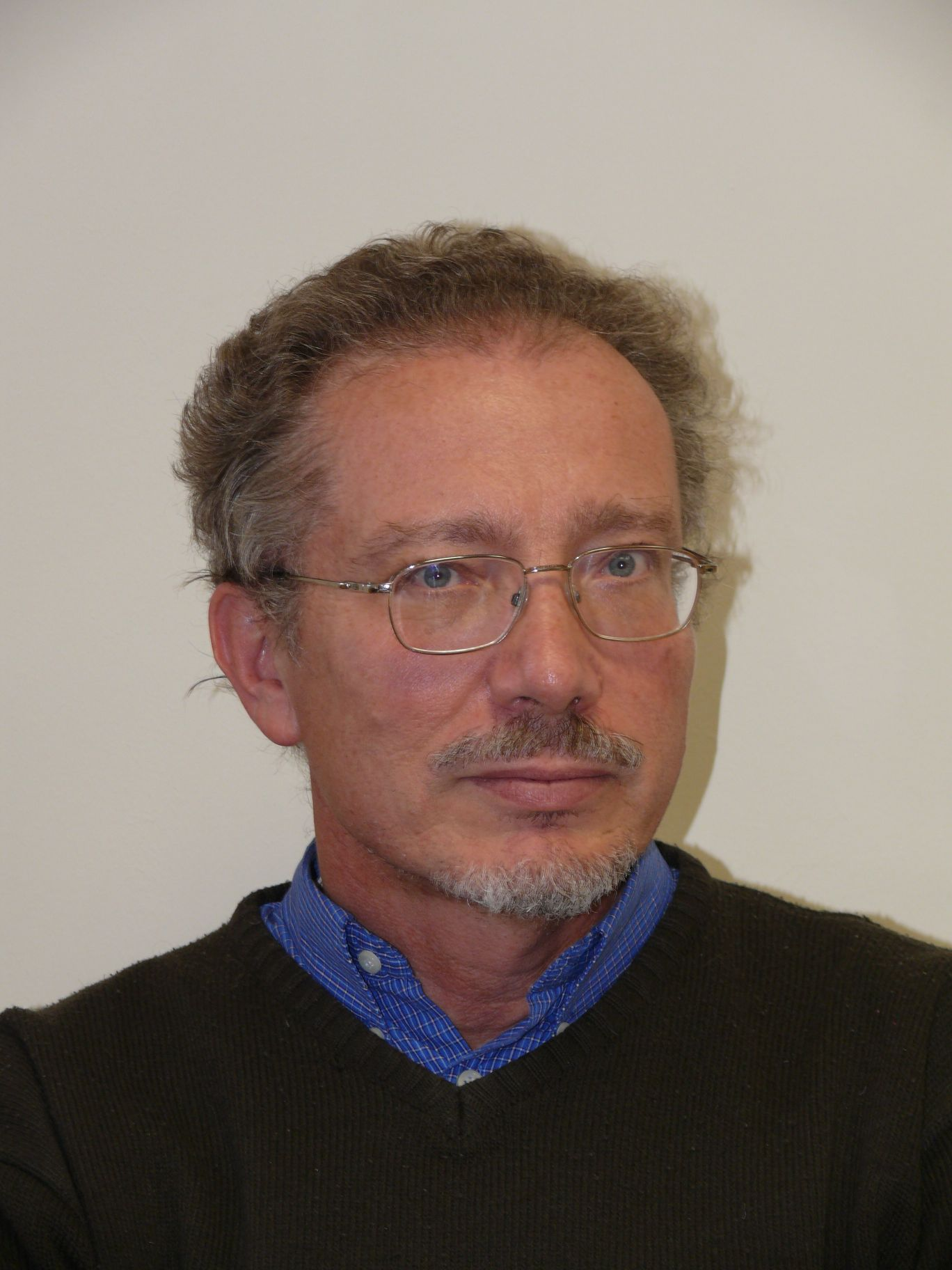
- Jean-Paul Delahaye in 2008
- Born: 29 June 1952 (age 74); Saint-Mandé; Seine
- Education: University of Paris-Sud
- Scientific career
- Fields: computer science Computational complexity theory computational game theory
- Doctoral advisor: Claude Brezinski

Jean-Paul Delahaye (born 29 June 1952 in Saint-Mandé Seine) is a French computer scientist and mathematician.

== Career ==
Delahaye has been a professor of computer science at the Lille University of Science and Technology since 1988 and a researcher in the school's computer sciences lab since 1983. Since 1991 he has written a monthly column in Pour la Science, the French version of Scientific American, dealing with mathematical games and recreations, logic, and computer science. He is a contributing author of the online scientific journal Interstices and a science and mathematics advisor to the Encyclopædia Britannica.

Delahaye won the 1998 d'Alembert prize from the Société mathématique de France for his books and articles popularizing mathematics, especially for the book Le fascinant nombre Pi.

== Works ==
- Delahaye, J.-P. (1981). "Automatic selection of sequence transformations". Math. Comp. 37 (155): 197–204. doi:10.1090/S0025-5718-1981-0616372-5.
- Formal Methods in Artificial Intelligence, North-Oxford Academic, 1987, ISBN 0470208260
- Le fascinant nombre pi, Paris: Bibliothèque Pour la Science, 1997, ISBN 2902918259
