= Les Illusions de la Psychanalyse =

1980 book by Jacques Van Rillaer

- Cover
- Author: Jacques Van Rillaer
- Language: French
- Subject: Psychoanalysis
- Publisher: Mardaga
- Publication date: 1980
- Publication place: Belgium
- Media type: Print (Paperback)
- Pages: 415 (fourth edition)
- ISBN: 978-2870091289

Les Illusions de la Psychanalyse is a 1980 book about psychoanalysis by the Belgian psychoanalyst Jacques Van Rillaer (UCLouvain), in which the author criticizes psychoanalytic theory and practice. Les Illusions de la Psychanalyse has been called a classic work.

== Reception ==
Les Illusions de la Psychanalyse received reviews in Revue Philosophique de Louvain in 1981, and in Revue Philosophique de la France et de l'Étranger in 1982. The psychologist Hans Eysenck praised the work, writing that Van Rillaer had "lost his illusions" and "written an extremely illuminating book highly critical of the theories and practices of his colleagues." Eysenck, calling Van Rillaer's work a classic, noted with regret that it was available only in French.
