= Gérard Majax =

French illusionist (born 1943)

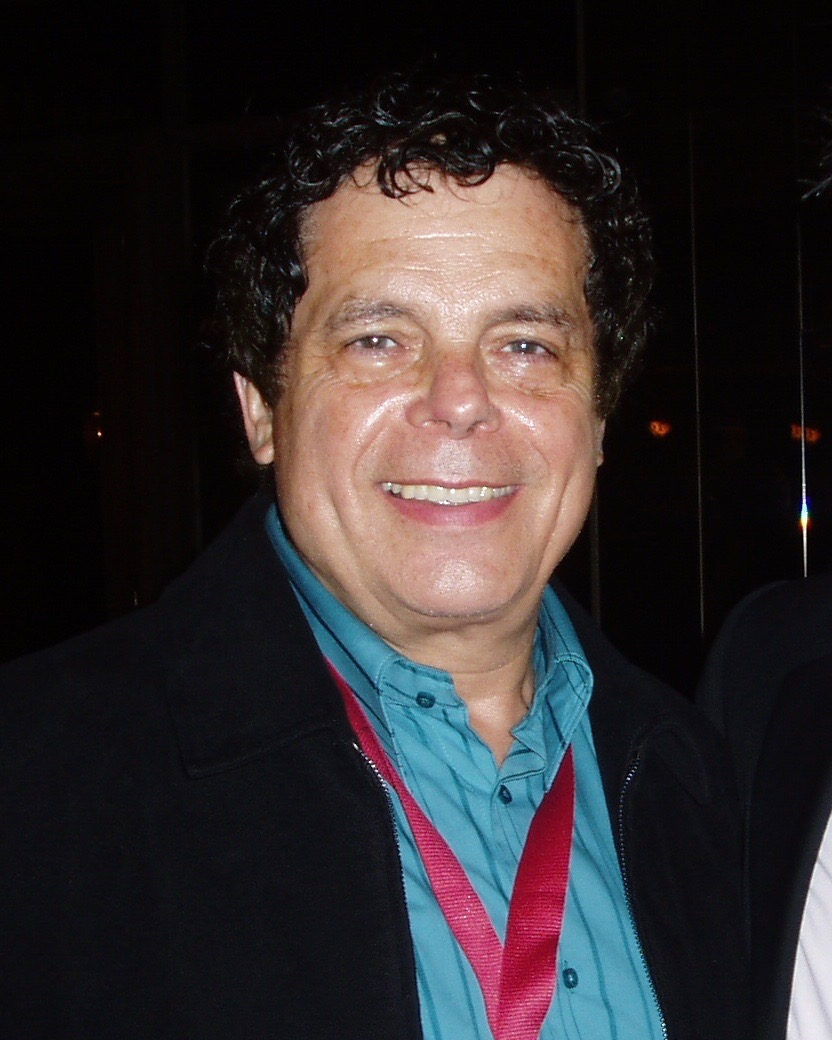
Gérard Majax in 2005

Maurice Faier, known as Gérard Majax (French pronunciation: [ʒeʁaʁ maʒaks]; born 28 April 1943), is a French illusionist. He was appointed a Knight of the Ordre des Arts et des Lettres in 1987. He has appeared in many television programmes, magic demonstrations, and movies.

Majax is also known in France as a skeptic; he has endeavored to publicly debunk claims about paranormal phenomena and supernatural abilities, using his skills as an illusionist to demonstrate how these effects are achieved. From 1987 until 2002 he, along with Jacques Théodor and Henri Broch of the Laboratoire de Zététique at the University of Nice Sophia-Antipolis, oversaw the International Zetetic Challenge.

During the 1990s, on a late-night television show hosted by Thierry Ardisson Majax gave a demonstration of the "rotating table" so-called supernatural phenomenon: a group of "randomly" selected people from the audience stood around a round table, put their hands on it, and the table went up and started rotating. Observation of a video recording made of this event showed that some participants had metal hacks hidden in the sleeves of their jackets. When the participants put the hands on the table, the hacks "pinched" the table underneath, allowing it to be lifted.

In 2000, he created The Hallucinoscope, a virtual reality system that works without electronics and gives the user the impression of walking above ground.

== See also ==
- James Randi is an American illusionist and skeptic who has also offered a prize for a demonstration of paranormal phenomena.
- La Maison de la Magie Robert-Houdin
