= Lycée Montaigne (Bordeaux) =

Senior high school in Bordeaux, France

Coordinates: 44.8344°N 0.5717°W

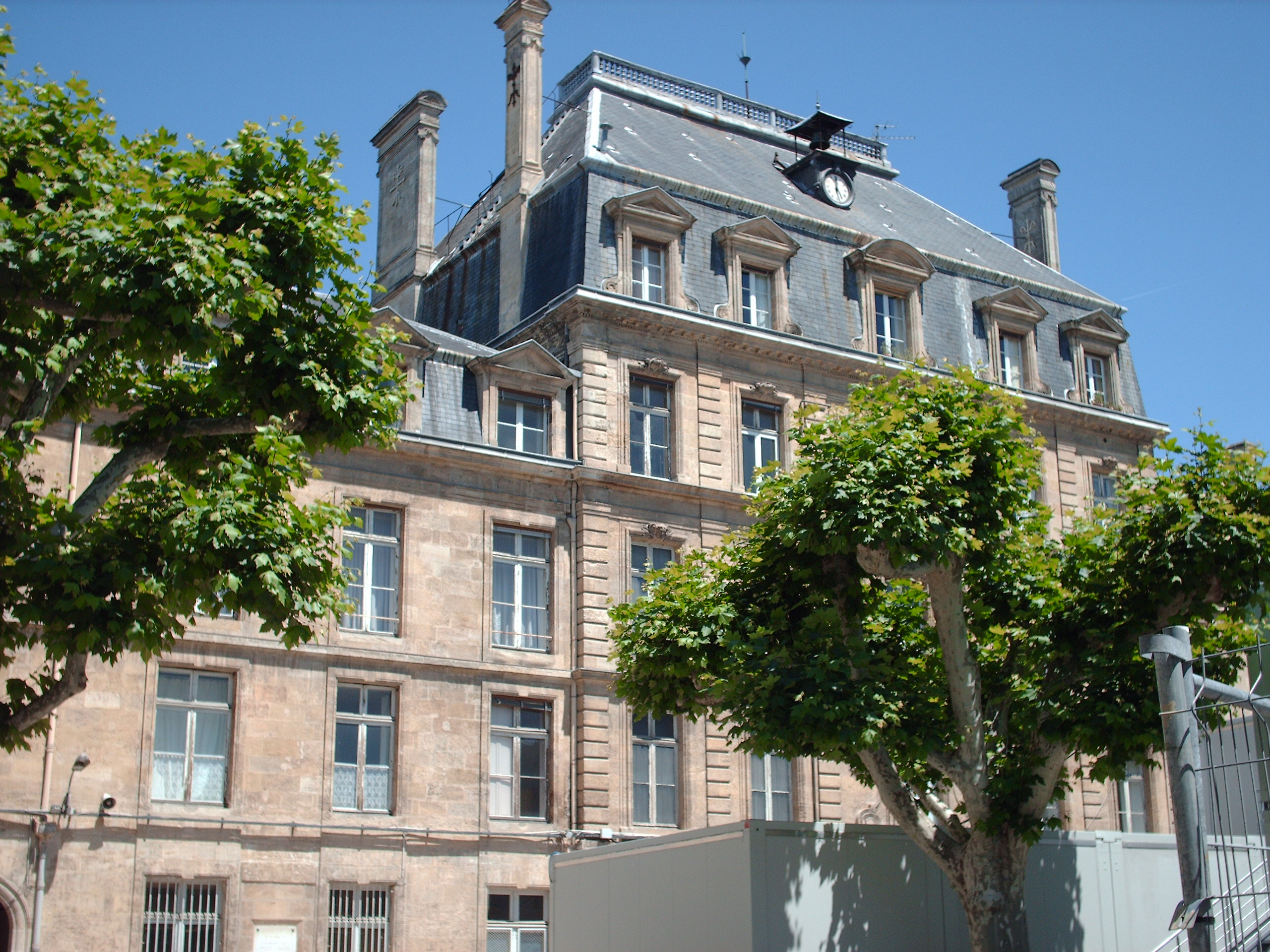
Entrance

Lycée Montaigne is a senior high school/sixth-form college in Bordeaux, France.

The Loi du 11 floréal de l’an X of 1 May 1802 established the school.
