= International Zetetic Challenge =

Former proof of paranormal prize

The International Zetetic Challenge (from Greek ζητεῖν zēteîn, "to search") was an attempt to prove or disprove the existence of, or demonstrate events related to, the paranormal. It ran from 1987 until 2002 and offered a €200,000 prize to "any person who could prove any paranormal phenomenon."

The challenge was overseen by two scientists, Henri Broch and Jacques Theodor; as well as a professional illusionist, Gérard Majax. Investigations and tests were carried out in the Laboratoire de Zététique at France's University of Nice Sophia-Antipolis.

After fifteen years and a number of investigations the challenge was ended, the prize was unawarded, as no verifiable paranormal incident had been witnessed by the challengers. The laboratory at the university still conducts research in fields related to the paranormal, however.

== See also ==
- Prabir Ghosh's $50,000 challenge against miracles and astrologers
- List of prizes for evidence of the paranormal
- James Randi's One Million Dollar Paranormal Challenge
