= Science & Vie Junior =

French childrens science magazine

Science & Vie Junior is a French science magazine targeting children. The magazine is published by Mondadori France, a subsidiary of the Italian media company Mondadori. The headquarters of the magazine is in Paris.

== History ==
Science & Vie Junior was started in 1989. The magazine is published on a monthly basis. The magazine is a spin-off of Science & Vie made for teenagers. In 2010, it won the Grand prix des Médias. In 2012 the circulation of the monthly was 166,451 copies.

== Sections of Science & Vie Junior ==
The magazine has three main parts.

- L'actu
- 100% Science
- MySVJ

=== L'actu ===
L'actu is the first section of the magazine. The main part of this section is news.

==== Cucaracha ====
Cucaracha is a comic in the L'actu section of the magazine. It is the first part of the section. It is about lives of cockroaches in human society. It was made by Marino Degano, and Laurent Salles.

Cucaracha cockroach is endowed with reason. With his small telescope, she is passionate about the sky and stars. But sometimes strange shadows infest his field of vision; these are Zoms who are struggling with frenzy. So rather than wait for the view emerges the heroine begins to watch them with a look relevant and sometimes critical.

The moral of this story... cockroaches need only be patient. One day the other, and will destroy the Zoms that day, they become "masters of the world".

Cucaracha is published monthly since November 2001 on the first page in Science et Vie Junior. The website presents a small selection of these stories.

==== Tout en images ====
Tout en images (All in images) is a part of L'actu. It compiles many pictures of an event. Then there are captions of one medium-sized paragraph. Tout en images takes seven pages most of the time.

==== Others ====
Another section explains news of different sciences. It also has one citation from a person, and a piece of statistics. That is called "Le nombre" (The number). There is also a place called textos with no images. Just text. Also, there is a fake interview that has as example anti-hydrogen.

=== 100% Sciences ===
100% Sciences is another section of the magazine. It has what is similar to the "Tout en images" but with less images. After, there are many long articles with one comic, experiments, technology tips, and math magic.

=== MySVJ ===
This section that means "My Science & Vie Junior". In this section, there is:

- Articles
- Reviews
- An invention
- Questions
- comics
