= Rationalist Union =

French organization

- Union rationaliste
- Formation: 1930; 96 years ago
- Founder: Paul Langevin
- Type: Nonprofit organisation
- Purpose: The promotion of reason
- Location: Paris, France
- Official language: French
- President: François Héran (since 2023)
- Affiliations: European Humanist Federation
- Website: union-rationaliste.org

The Rationalist Union (French: Union rationaliste) is a French nonprofit organization founded in 1930 that promotes the role of reason. Many of the members are scientists, members of the Institut de France, Nobel Prize laureates, professors at the Collège de France, and famous writers.

The Union is strongly republican (in the French sense of the term) and Jacobin and is opposed to communitarianism.

The Rationalist Union hosts two radio shows, one on the radio of the French Anarchist Federation, and another on the public radio France Culture, and publishes two journals, Les Cahiers Rationalistes, and Raison Présente.
