= Le Quart Livre =

1552 novel by François Rabelais

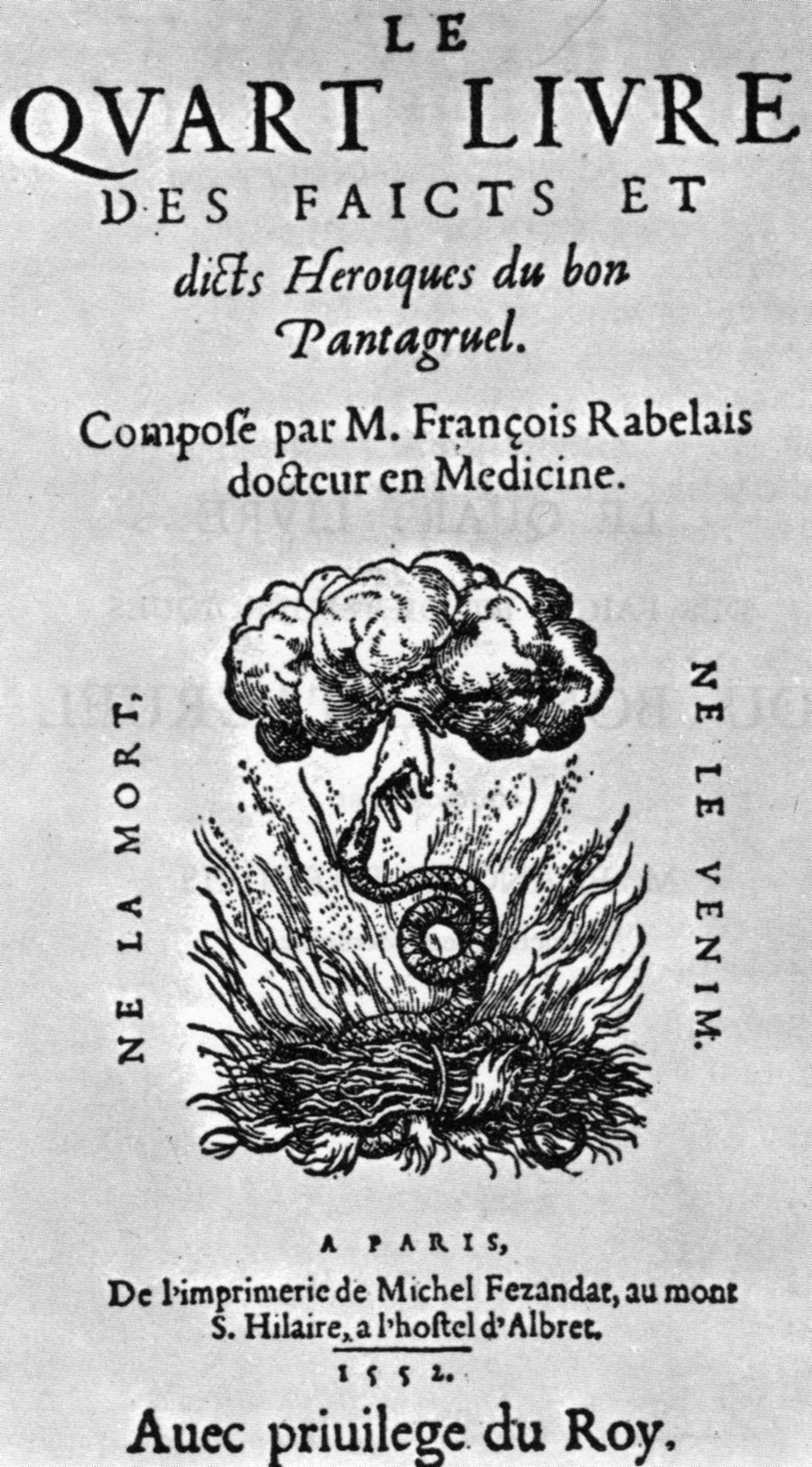
- Author: François Rabelais
- Language: French
- Genre: Novel
- Publication date: 1552
- Publication place: Kingdom of France

Le Quart Livre (The Fourth Book in English) is a novel by François Rabelais and published in its final version in 1552. The author was confronted with significant challenges in the context of this sequel to the adventures of Pantagruel, particularly in the wake of the publication of The Third Book and the subsequent opposition from theologians at the Sorbonne. Nevertheless, he obtained the support of Cardinal Odet de Coligny, and despite another attempt at censorship, the work achieved rapid success. The prologues serve to illustrate this polemical context.

The novel, written with the comic flair typical of François Rabelais, is a sea voyage narrative in which the protagonists encounter fantastical creatures and places that resonate with the author's humanist concerns. Following their decision at the end of The Third Book, Pantagruel, Panurge, and their companions embark on the Thalamège towards the oracle of the Divine Bottle, which they will reach in the Fifth Book.

The novel employs the conventions of the travel narrative, evoking the intellectual curiosity and sense of discovery that characterized the era of great explorations. However, it subverts the conventional wisdom of these discoveries through the use of satire and fantastical elements. The narrative draws inspiration from Greek mythology, particularly the quest for the Golden Fleece.

The structure of the novel has been interpreted in several ways. It has been seen as a juxtaposition of independent episodes lacking overall cohesion, as a narrative structured by recurring themes (such as sacraments, storms, and monsters), or conversely, as a highly structured text centered around the battle against the Physeter (a whale-like creature).

The narration is imbued with a pronounced allegorical quality, particularly evident in the enumeration of locales. However, this aspect is obfuscated by the blending of stylistic elements and subjected to satire by the narrator himself. Conversely, the satire more overtly reflects François Rabelais' humanist beliefs, denouncing the corruption of justice and, more significantly, resonating with Evangelical critiques of papal excesses.

The style of Le Quart Livre is characterized by a celebration of joyful erudition. The use of puns, proverbs, aphorisms, lists, and onomatopoeias reflects a linguistic playfulness and a contemplation of the nature of words. The novel's conclusion, particularly the episode involving the frozen words, illustrates the pivotal role of language in the narrative, with the interpretation of signs at the core of this passage.

As in Rabelais' other novels, the comic dimension of Le Quart Livre is marked by a certain ambivalence. This ambivalence is evident in the representation of monsters, which build the burlesque and fantastical dimension of the story while also carrying rich symbolic implications. Similarly, the obscene themes contribute to the novel's satirical charge while reflecting its carnivalesque dimension and Evangelical ideals.

François Rabelais draws from a multitude of ancient and contemporary sources to construct his novel, including the works of Lucian of Samosata and Teofilo Folengo. His reference to Hippocrates demonstrates his interest in medicine, while the incorporation of elements from various dramatic genres lends a theatrical quality to numerous scenes.

== Genesis ==
=== Biographical context ===
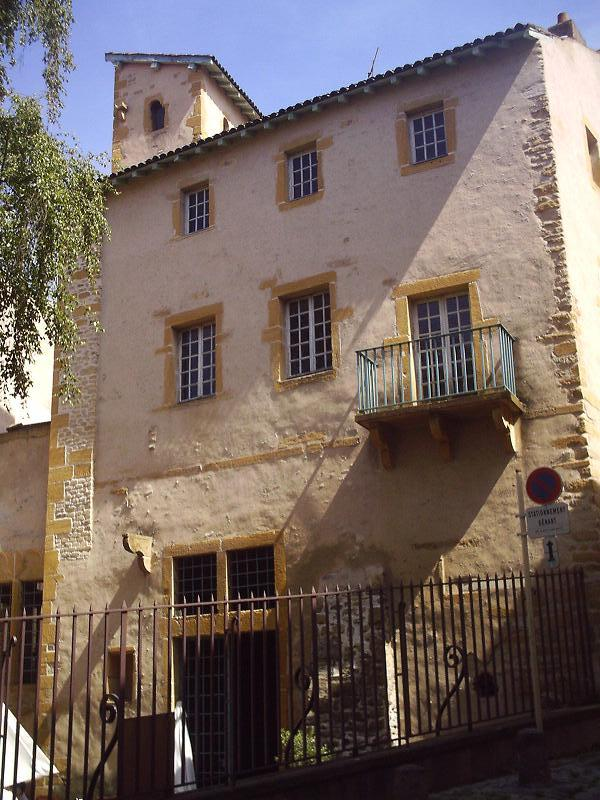
Chapel adjoining Rabelais's house in Metz.

The documented evidence concerning Rabelais' movements and activities between the publication of The Third Book in 1546 and the final version of Le Quart Livre in 1552 is insufficient. The condemnation of The Third Book by the Sorbonne authorities resulted in his exile in Metz, which was then a free imperial city. It is possible that he undertook a diplomatic mission on behalf of the Du Bellays during this period. It seems probable that he wrote at least part of Le Quart Livre of 1548 in that location, as evidenced by allusions to the subsequent sessions of the Council of Trent. On March 31, 1547, King Francis I, who had previously demonstrated support for Rabelais, passed away. It is possible that Rabelais accompanied his protector, Cardinal Jean du Bellay, on his journey to Rome, where he arrived on September 27, 1547. Alternatively, he may have joined him later, after depositing the unfinished manuscript of his latest novel in Lyon between the summer of 1547 and early 1548. In 1549, the Sciomachie was published, in which the author lauded the cardinal's contributions to the crown. The circumstances surrounding the publication of Le Quart Livre in 1552 were more propitious, with Rabelais overseeing the printing of his book and receiving direct support from Odet de Coligny and King Henry II.

=== From Le Quart Livre of 1548 to the one of 1552 ===
The initial iteration of Le Quart Livre, published in 1548, comprised a mere eleven chapters. Three editions have been preserved: two published in Lyon without the name of the publisher, but likely from the workshops of Pierre de Tours, and one with his name but undated. (Note: Rabelais 1998, p. 649, Les éditions du Quart Livre) The text is notable for its unfinished nature, concluding abruptly in the middle of a passage. This is followed by a legal phrase: "Is it true that because more is not said?" Many hypotheses have been put forth to account for this hasty publication. One such hypothesis is that the manuscript was stolen, a claim that is contradicted by the presence of a prologue and the printing patent of 1550. Another hypothesis is that the writer was experiencing financial difficulties or that the publication was intended to respond to immediate political events, such as Charles V's refusal to admit Henry II to the Order of the Golden Fleece. (Note: Rabelais 1998, p. 647, La première rédaction du Quart Livre (1548)) The editions printed by Pierre de Tours do not exhibit the orthographic traits that Rabelais typically employed, suggesting that the author entrusted the manuscript to a Parisian publisher, who subsequently released a lost edition. Pierre de Tours then republished this edition, imposing the norms of his workshop.

The final version was published on January 28, 1552, by Michel Fezandat, accompanied by a short text, the "Brief Declaration", which may be considered a kind of lexicon. The attribution of this text to Rabelais was once debated. The sale of the novel was suspended for two weeks by Parliament due to censorship by the faculty of theology. However, this did not prevent the book's swift success, as evidenced by the appearance of reprints and counterfeit editions that same year.

== Analytical summary ==
=== Defiant prologues ===
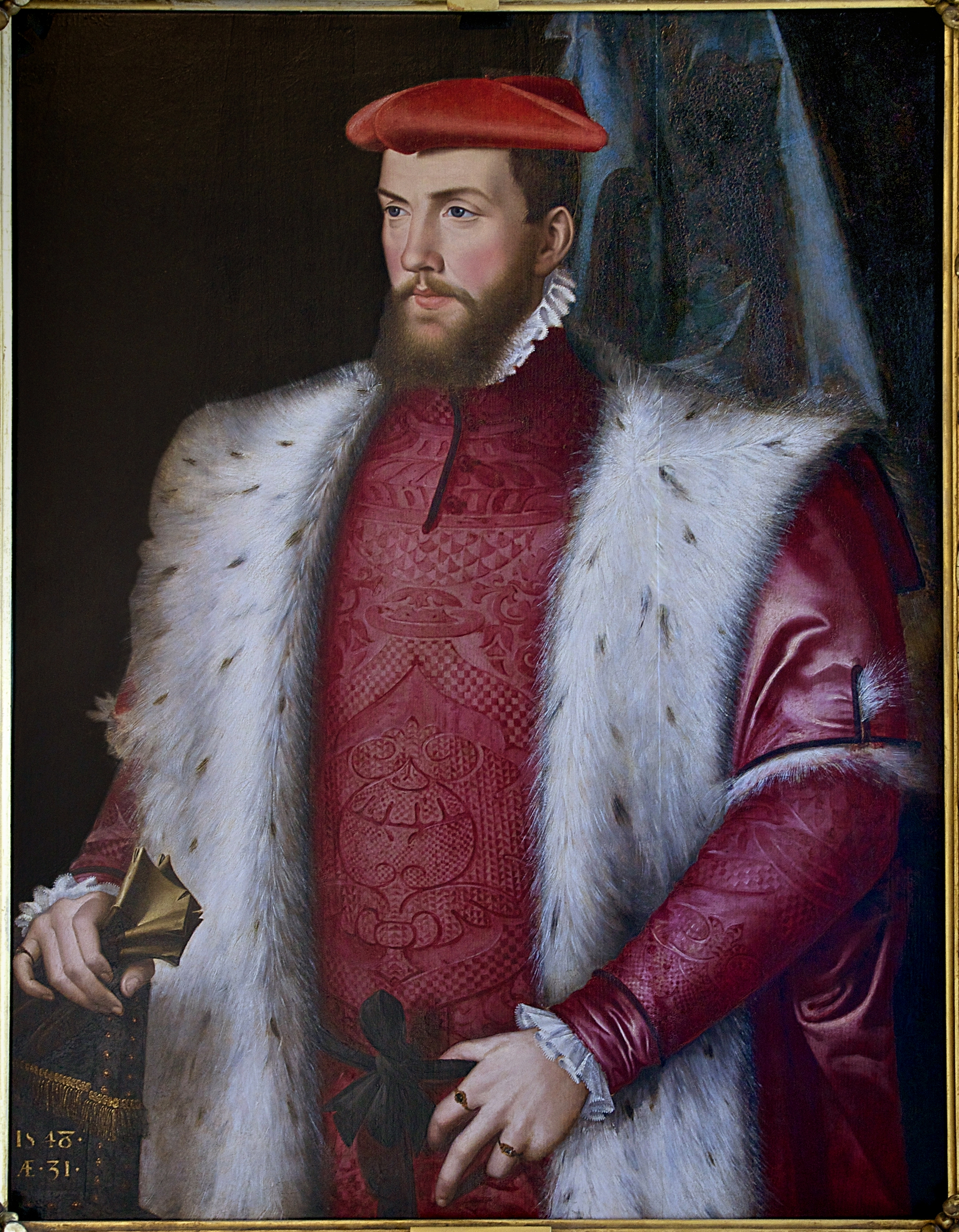
Cardinal Odet de Coligny, trained by Nicolas Berauld, an admirer of Erasmus like Rabelais, was between 28 and 30 years old when he granted his protection to the Touraine humanist, then in his fifties.

The 1552 edition commences with an epistle to Cardinal Odet de Coligny, through whom the privilege of 1550 had been obtained. (Note: Rabelais 1998, p. 25, Note 2) In a manner that resonates with the sentiments expressed in the preface of 1548, Rabelais elucidates that his Pantagruelian mythologies are principally designed to provide entertainment for his readers. (Note: Rabelais 1998, p. 30, Note 18) Additionally, he makes a point of noting that, according to Hippocrates, a physician should not hesitate to disguise themselves and adopt a cheerful demeanor for the benefit of the patient. He laments the accusations of heresy leveled by certain individuals, whom he identifies as "Cannibals, misanthropes, agelasts." (Note: Rabelais 1998, p. 33, Rabelais quote) These are likely references to attacks from the Sorbonne, Calvin, or Puy-Herbault, a cleric from the abbey of Fontevraud. (Note: Rabelais 1998, p. 32, Note 28) He also expresses gratitude to the cardinal for the protection he and the king provide. The epistle, while not displaying the usual verve of Rabelais' prologues, asserts the dignity of comedic intent and appeals for the reader's benevolence. It likens this appeal to that of King Francis I listening to the readings of Rabelais' books by Anagnoste Pierre du Chastel. It is worth noting that the epistle pays homage to the living, a salvific word that counters misunderstandings and slander. In this context, the cardinal is compared to the Gallic Hercules, a figure of eloquence invented by Lucian. The decision to persist in writing is associated with the continuation of his medical practice, as evidenced by the signature on the letter, which mentions the author's profession. Rabelais reaffirms the seriousness of his comedic undertaking and asserts his right to be judged on the merits of his work alone.

In contrast, the 1548 prologue serves to elucidate the fundamental characteristics and purpose of the work. It also makes oblique references to the political landscape through its portrayal of the conflict between magpies and jays. (Note: This evokes the war against Brittany.) (Note: Rabelais 1998, p. 618, Note 11) Furthermore, it underscores the hypocrisy and mendacity of those who have leveled accusations against the author. The 1552 prologue, in its final iteration, introduces a more complex structural framework and a broader scope of content. Rabelais, in contrast to his previous work, presents a more conciliatory tone, advocating for a lifestyle of moderation and humility. This is exemplified in his portrayal of Zacchaeus and Couillatris, who are directly inspired by an Aesop fable. The woodcutter, in his distress, was so vocal in his lamentations that his pleas reached Jupiter, who was otherwise engaged in addressing matters of international politics with the other deities of Olympus, including the ongoing conflict between Moscow and the Tartars. Jupiter requests that Mercury present the unfortunate man with three axes (his own, a golden one, and a silver one) and to sever his head if he makes an incorrect choice. Couillatris makes the appropriate decision, and in recognition of his humility, he is rewarded with the other two axes, which prove to be a valuable addition to his possessions. However, neighboring peasants attempt to emulate his actions but ultimately select the fatal golden axe. This prologue, nevertheless, presents some ambiguity, as the virtuous man's complaints exert a favorable influence on destiny, prompting readers to consider the underlying implications of the praise of simplicity.

=== Sea voyage ===
==== A mysterious itinerary ====
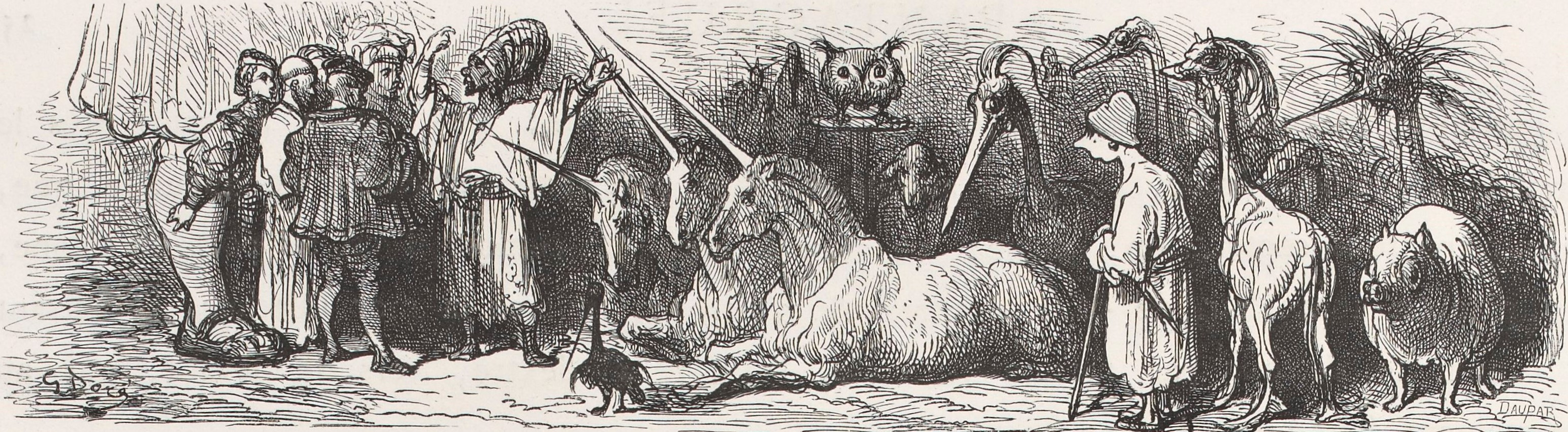
Unicorns for sale on the island of Medamothi.

The narrative commences with the embarkation towards the oracle of the Divine Bottle, which was referenced at the conclusion of The Third Book. On the day of the Vestal Feast, Pantagruel and his companions set sail aboard the Thalamège, a ship whose name had been presented as a common noun in the previous novel. They were accompanied by twelve other ships, the descriptions of which were replete with religious and alchemical symbols. (Note: Rabelais 1998, p. 80, Note 1) The initial description of the route, which aimed to circumvent the Cape of Good Hope, is somewhat opaque, potentially either an intentional or inadvertent attempt to perplex the reader. It suggests two possible courses of action: a northwest trajectory, following the route of Jacques Cartier, or a northeast route, as implied by the mention of Indians who had taken this route to reach Germany. (Note: Rabelais 1998, pp. 86–88, Note 32)

The initial destination is the island of Medamothi (derived from the Greek μηδαμόθι (mêdamóthi), meaning "nowhere"). (Note: Rabelais 1998, p. 90, Note 1) The protagonists arrive on a day designated for commercial transactions, which brings together the most affluent merchants from Africa and Asia. They are intrigued by the exotic merchandise and unusual creatures they encounter. Brother Jean procures two portraits, which he remunerates for in "monkey money"; (Note: This is the first recorded use of the expression, although its usage dates back to the Middle Ages.) (Note: Rabelais 1998, p. 92, Note 12) Panurge purchases a painting that imitates Philomela's embroidery, which depicts Tereus' crime; Epistemon acquires another that depicts Plato's ideas and Epicurus' atoms; and Rhizotome procures one that faithfully reproduces Echo. Among other curiosities, Pantagruel procures three unicorns and a tarandus, a reindeer reputed to alter its coloration in accordance with its surrounding environment and emotional state. These cryptozoological curiosities are drawn from Pliny the Elder's Natural History. (Note: Rabelais 1998, p. 94, Notes 23 & 25) The island of Medamothi thus introduces the novel with the marvelous, yet also with illusion, deception, and mirage, akin to the paintings that depict the unrepresentable. This passage has given rise to a number of contradictory interpretations. Some commentators view it as an example of Alexandrian symbolism, while others see it as an illustration of a pre-classical taste for idealized imitation or even as a device employed by the author to engage in self-referential discourse within the context of the fiction. The painting created by Epistemon has been perceived as a parody of Neoplatonic attempts to make the intelligible visible through hieroglyphs.

A swift vessel overtook the crew. Malicorne, a squire of Gargantua, delivers a letter in which the father inquires about the commencement of the voyage, citing the adage "the beginning is half of everything". (Note: Rabelais 1998, p. 103, Rabelais quote) (Note: Rabelais attributes this formula to Hesiod, repeating an error made by Erasmus in the Adages (I, 1).) (Note: Rabelais 1998, p. 102, Note 14) Pantagruel's reply, written in a Ciceronian style that contrasts with the archaic style of the previous letter, demonstrates his gratitude and filial piety. This passage also introduces the art of pigeon racing, as the use of carrier pigeons had been lost in Europe by then.

==== Dindenault's sheep ====
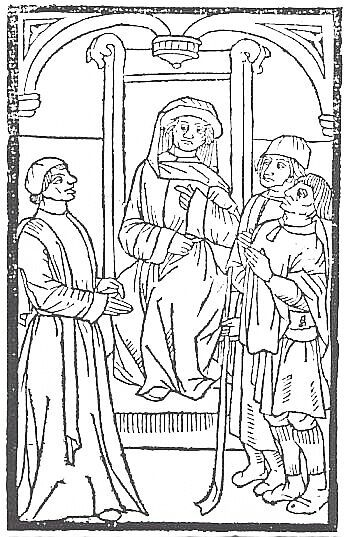
The Farce de Maître Pathelin is evoked at the end of the episode: Reste il icy, dist Panurge, ulle ame moutonniere? ("Where are those of Thibault l'Aignelet?")

As they continue their voyage, the protagonists encounter a merchant ship returning from the Lanternoys. They become aware of the forthcoming general chapter of the Lanterns, at which the assembly is preparing to engage in a practice known as "lanterning", which involves speaking nonsense. (Note: The land of the Lanternoys is borrowed from Lucian of Samosata, already referenced in Pantagruel.) The merchant Dindenault (Note: The name Dindenault derives either from dandin, meaning fool, or refers to the turkey, known at the time as the Indian rooster.) (Note: Rabelais 1998, p. 118, Note 11) derisively critiques Panurge's attire, noting that since The Third Book, Panurge has been wearing his glasses on his hat and a costume devoid of codpieces as a vow of marriage. Dindenault refers to him as a "cuckold". In response, Panurge launches an expletive. The merchant brandishes his sword. Brother Jean attempts to intimidate him, but the situation is defused by the intervention of the captain and the passengers. Subsequently, Panurge requests that Dindenault sell him a sheep, having invited Epistemon and Brother Jean to observe the proceedings. The latter evades the question, continuing to taunt Panurge with epithets such as "rascal", "scoundrel", and "fool", while simultaneously extolling the exceptional quality of his sheep. The rams are purported to belong to the Chrysomallos race, characterized by its golden fleece. Each part of the animal is believed to possess unique qualities. For instance, the wool is said to be of such exceptional quality that it could be used to create the finest Rouen cloth. Similarly, the skin is thought to be comparable to that of Turkish or Montélimar leather. Additionally, urine is regarded as a natural fertilizer, capable of enhancing agricultural yields. Finally, the dung is believed to possess medicinal properties, (Note: Rabelais 1998, p. 129, Rabelais quote) with the potential to cure up to 78 diseases. The merchant, pressed by the captain to conclude the transaction, ultimately agrees to sell the animal for the considerable sum of three livres tournois. Panurge selects a sheep that is vocalizing loudly and, with the sheep in view of the other animals, throws it into the sea. The entire flock imitates this behavior, resulting in each sheep jumping and ultimately drowning in the water. The merchant, shepherds, and sheepmen attempt to maintain their grip on the animals, but are ultimately pulled in with them. Panurge, armed with an oar to prevent them from climbing back up, delivers a sermon to them about the miseries of this world and the beauty of the next. He promises to erect cenotaphs and tombs while wishing them to meet a whale like Jonah. With the ship now devoid of its cargo and its crew, Brother Jean inquires as to why Panurge had paid the merchant. In response, Panurge asserts that he has received value for his money, that he is not ungrateful, and that no man has ever displeased him without repentance. The monk ultimately determines that Panurge is effectively condemning himself, akin to an "old devil", as retribution ultimately resides with God. This episode, derived from Teofilo Folengo's Macaronic Poems, serves to reinforce the mischievous, cowardly, and vindictive nature of Panurge, as observed in Pantagruel but somewhat tempered in The Third Book. Additionally, it highlights the underlying motivation behind the journey, which is closely tied to Panurge's apprehension about an unhappy marriage.

==== Ennasin and Cheli ====
The ship, propelled by the west wind, reaches the island of Alliances, formerly known as Ennasin. (Note: The word is formed from esnasé, meaning having a cut nose, and the Hebrew suffix -in.) This island is inhabited by a race of people with clover-shaped noses. The podestà informed the travelers that they are all members of the same family and allies. The relationships between the islanders are unconventional. A woman refers to her husband as "my porpoise", and he calls her "my cuttlefish". Another couple, a simpleton and his ally, address each other as "my mattress" and "my blanket". A bachelor calls a bachelorette "muse", and she calls him "horn". Panurge notes that if they mated, their relationship would resemble a "cornemuse", or bagpipe. The term "Ennasin" evokes the Essenes, a sect that was considered the ancestor of monasticism. The kinship ties allude to the monastic craze for inventing fictitious family connections. It is also probable that they refer to the "love alliances", a medieval custom that was transformed into an aristocratic fashion where people formalized a spiritual friendship. The Alliancers thus contrast with the model of Thélème through their arbitrariness and display a marked contempt for the seventh sacrament. (Note: Rabelais 1998, p. 142, Note 2) Their nonsensical word games also express a divorce between language and meaning.

During the brief stop on the island of Cheli, Brother Jean elects to withdraw from the company of his hosts and instead spend his time in the kitchens. A discussion ensues among the companions, questioning the monks' predilection for such locales. In his account, Epistemon notes that during a visit to Florence, a monk from Amiens, Bernard Lardon, expressed regret at the absence of rotisseries, while the others admired the grandeur of the architectural monuments. Pantagruel and Panurge contribute further anecdotes, indicating that while these locations are unworthy of kings, they are nevertheless appropriate for poets and individuals of lesser status. The Hebrew term cheli, which appears in the Bible and is used to refer to "pots and pans", suggests that a Kabbalistic motif may underlie the text, potentially related to the vessels of the Chevirat haKelim and the celestial hierarchy.

==== Chicanery and beatings ====
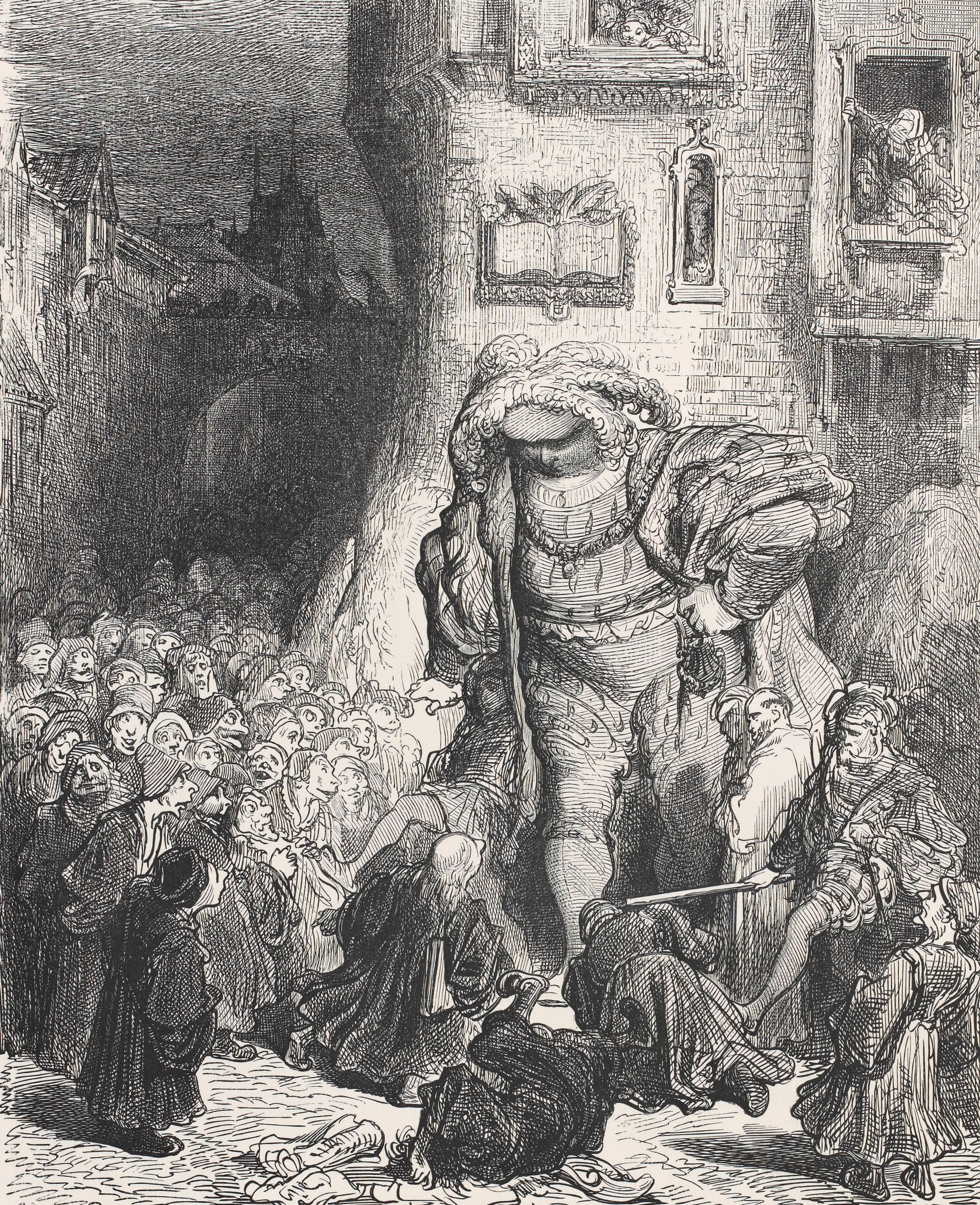
The Chicanous demand to be beaten.

On the following day, the crew arrived at the island of Procuration, which is inhabited by lawyers and those who practice Chicanous law. Rather than offering hospitality, they propose a commercial transaction. An interpreter elucidates to Pantagruel that the Chicanous derive their livelihood through the infliction of physical harm. Under the instructions of a usurer, priest, or lawyer, they verbally abuse a gentleman, who is compelled to defend his honor by striking them with considerable force. Subsequently, litigation is initiated, seeking redress, which ultimately results in the gentleman's downfall and incarceration. These chicaners, the subject of Rabelais' derision, were clerks tasked with the collection of ecclesiastical taxes from the minor nobility. In response, Panurge recounts the method of Lord Basché, who, during his struggle against the troops of Julius II and harassed by the prior of Saint-Louand during the War of the League of Cambrai, organized a fictitious betrothal, during which a custom requires friendly blows. However, he equipped his men with jousting gloves covered with ermine skin and invited them to strike the Chicanous with zeal. On the appointed day, a portly Chicanou arrived, bowed repeatedly, and inevitably summoned his host to court. By the end of the festivities, he was bruised and battered, though he retained a cheerful demeanor, evidently gratified by the reception.

Lord Basché proceeded to engage in a period of sustained consumption and recounted a trick of François Villon. The poet, who had undertaken to prepare a Passion for the fairs of Niort, could not obtain the necessary vestments, namely a stole and a chasuble, from the sacristan, Étienne Tappecoue. On the following Saturday, the actors, including Lord Basché, disguised themselves as devils and paraded through the town with animal skins, horns, and drums. They managed to spook Tappecoue's mare, causing her to gallop and buck, so that her rider, dismounted but caught with his foot in the stirrup, was gradually torn apart. With these words, Lord Basché doubled everyone's pay and expressed his wish never to be summoned by the Chicanous again.

Nevertheless, as he had foreseen, the situation continued to unfold in a tragicomical manner. The previous messenger was replaced by another of considerable height and slender physique. Basché and his men ceased their leisure activities and hastily prepared for the improvised wedding, which was met with widespread jubilation. Following the sprinkling of holy water, blows rained down, and the Chicanou, bleeding, was remounted on his horse without having played his role. A third Chicanou was dispatched, accompanied by two witnesses. Upon arrival during the meal, he summoned Basché, who took a copy of the summons and also invited him to the betrothal. The Chicanou, after declaring that traditions were being lost, initiated the brawl. Once it was over, the guests complained about the injuries and the Chicanou's eagerness to fight. Upon returning home, the three companions praised the betrothal they would never forget and excused the brawl they had begun.

In his commentary on this narrative, Pantagruel posits that the reverence for God obfuscates its comedic quality. Epistemon posits that culpability lies not with the Chicanous, but with the prior, who derived as much pleasure from contradicting the lord as from witnessing the beating of innocents. Brother John attempts to ascertain the extent of the Chicanous's corruption by proposing to beat one for 20 écus. He administers a severe beating, which the individual in question responds to with jubilation and provokes envy among his companions. As they were departing, they were informed of the execution of Rouge Muzeau, the molested monk, due to his theft of the "ferrements de la messe", which translates to "the tools of worship". This episode has been interpreted as evidence supporting the revolts of the reformers against the abuses of the Catholic Church. René du Puy, the lord of Basché, was a genuine Poitevin nobleman. The area surrounding Saint-Maixent, the setting for Villon's malevolent actions, was the site of violent Calvinist riots in 1538. The mock engagements increase sacrileges, as evidenced by the liturgical surplice used to conceal gauntlets. Pantagruel's restraint prevents this satire from being reduced to praise for violence, which is contrary to the Erasmian humanism that condemns vindictive resentment. Nevertheless, Rabelais maintains the narrative and theatrical power of his evocation.

==== A terrible storm between two funeral evocations ====
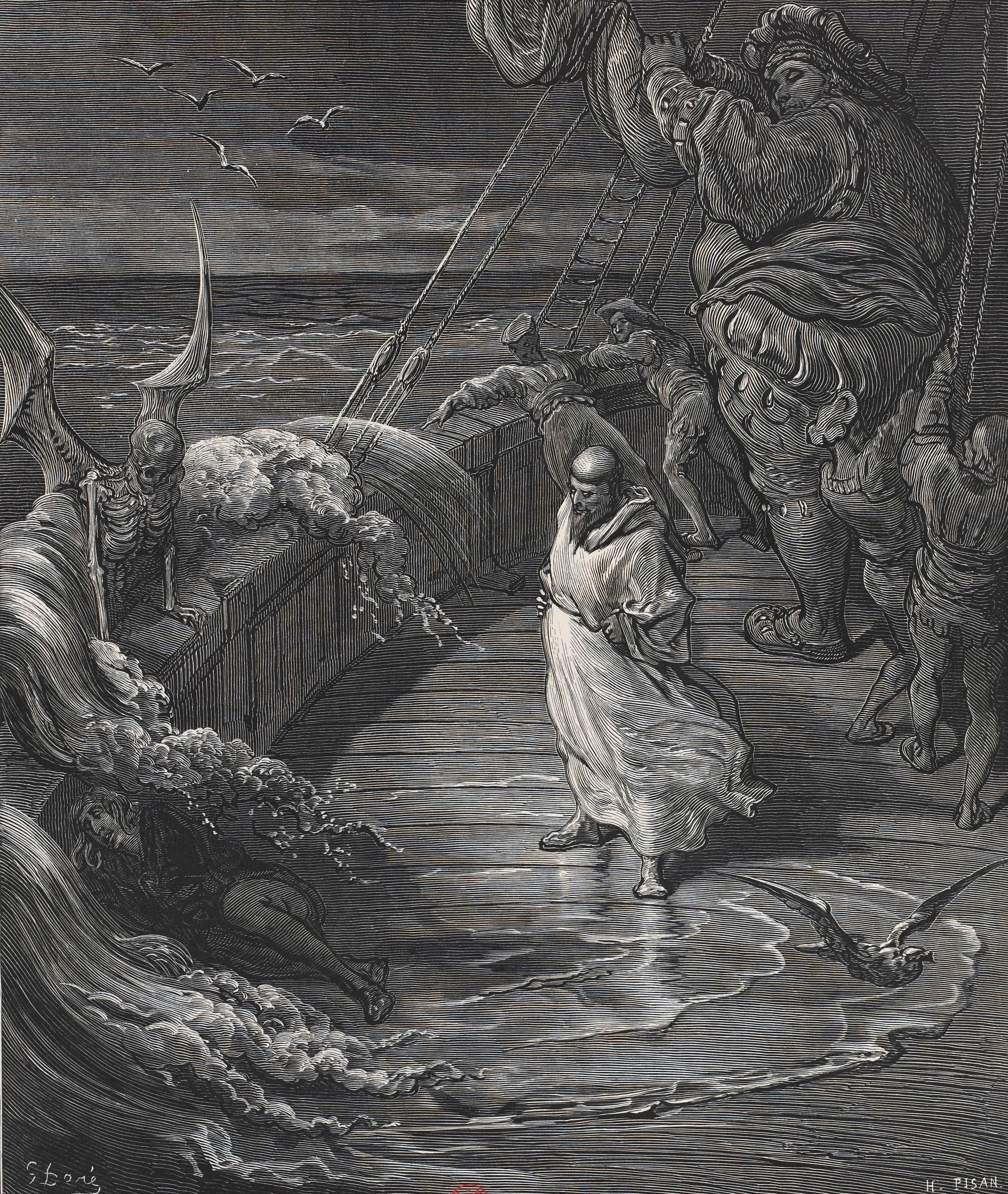
Brother John admonishes Panurge for his cowardice.

As they traverse the islands of Tohu and Bohu, the protagonists become aware of the demise of the colossal Bringuenarilles. Having exhausted his supply of windmills—his customary sustenance—the giant fell ill after ingesting frying pans and cauldrons. He ultimately succumbed to the recommended treatment proposed by the physicians. "A wedge of fresh butter from the mouth of a hot oven." This character is derived from The Disciple of Pantagruel, an anonymous text published in 1538 that draws upon the Pantagruelian saga and folkloric motifs. A series of unusual deaths is referenced in this passage, including that of Aeschylus, who is said to have perished from a tortoiseshell dropped by an eagle; a man who was ashamed to release gas in front of Emperor Claudius; and Philomenes and Zeuxis, who died laughing. Bringuenarilles' death, initially inconsequential and absurd like those that follow, serves to illustrate that the end of life is a trivial epiphenomenon in the grand scheme of things.

Subsequently, the crew encounters nine vessels laden with monks, an omen of misfortune, en route to the Council of Chesil (Note: This is a satirical allusion to the Council of Trent, with kessil meaning fool in Hebrew.) to examine articles of faith against new heresies. A tempestuous storm suddenly erupts, causing significant challenges for the majority of the crew as they contend with the formidable forces of nature. Panurge, suffering from ailments that impede his mobility, remains stationary on the deck, expressing his distress pitifully. Upon observing his fellow traveler wallowing in tears and evading the collective endeavor, Brother John admonishes him, urging him to take action. Despite repeated admonishments, Panurge trembles with fear, stutters, sees his final hour approaching, and demands his testament. This is a common topo in travel literature and epic tales, in which the storm carries an underlying evangelical discourse. This contrasts with Pantagruel's calm and faith in God, and with Panurge's superstitious cowardice and Brother John's blasphemous swearing. (Note: Rabelais 1998, p. 220, Notes 1 & 4)

Epistemon highlights the implausibility of drafting a will in such circumstances. Panurge posits that the document will be carried ashore by a wave, citing analogous examples. As the landmass becomes visible on the horizon, the sailors alter their course of action, and the previously observed turbulence subsides. In the aftermath of the incident, Pantagruel posits that while a state of perpetual fear indicates a lack of courage, its absence suggests a deficiency in one's comprehension of potential dangers. He further asserts that the efficacy of one's actions is the sole determining factor in this regard. Once the tempest has abated, Panurge feigns diligence and boasts of his fortitude. Epistemon asserts that invoking the gods is not an end in itself. Brother John, in turn, mocks the coward, suggesting they flay him to make a waterproof cloak from his skin. Eusthenes concludes with a Lombard proverb: "Once the danger has passed, the saints are mocked." This collective ordeal provides an illustrative example of a unified community working towards a shared objective. Additionally, the theme of death connects the preceding island with the subsequent one, namely the island of the Macræons (or Macréons).

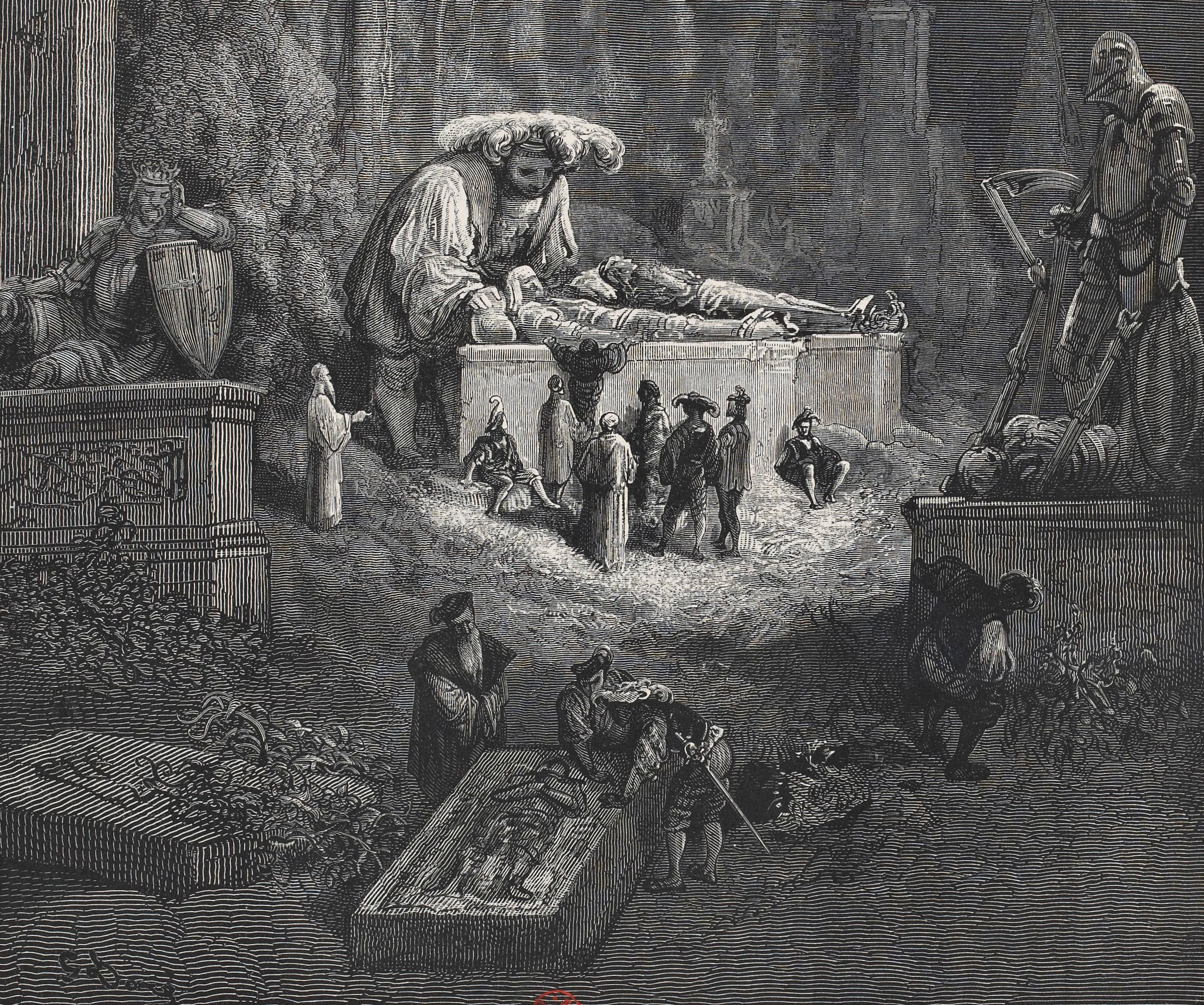
Tombs and antiquities visited on Macraeons Island.

The former magistrate of the region, known as Macrobe, welcomes the visitors and guides them through the ancient monuments, which are inscribed with epitaphs in diverse languages that are no longer in use. Panurge observes that the etymological meaning of the word macræon is "old man" and posits that the term maquerelle (procuress) is derived from it, given that this role is often held by elderly women. Macrobe elucidates that the forest is a habitat for both malevolent and benevolent entities, whose demise precipitates a cataclysmic upheaval. Pantagruel and his companions cite examples of individuals who, despite their beneficial and admired contributions during their lifetimes, have left behind a legacy of adverse consequences following their demise, often accompanied by significant natural or social upheavals. The prodigies that preceded the demise of Guillaume du Bellay, the lord of Langey, and the ominous sign that it represented for France are briefly discussed. Brother John queries the mortality of heroes, angels, and demons. In response, Pantagruel affirms his belief in the immortality of the soul and proceeds to recount the death of Pan during Tiberius' reign. This narrative, as presented in Plutarch's The Cessation of the Oracles, has been reinterpreted in Christian thought, with the Greek god being associated with Christ. While Eusebius, Paulo Marsio, and Guillaume Bigot consider pagans to be demons who unwittingly announce the coming of the Messiah, their tears are explained by their defeat. Rabelais, however, focuses on the scandal and pain of this death. Therefore, despite the apparent contrast between the deaths of Guillaume du Bellay and Bringuenarilles, both deaths illustrate two aspects of death: absurdity and tragedy, pain and absurdity. The character of Macrobe, likely a reference to the Latin writer of the same name, encourages us to consider the ethical implications of this passage beyond its theological context. Le commentaire sur le Songe de Scipion (The commentary on the Dream of Scipio) demonstrates that only active virtue allows for hope of salvation, as evidenced by the civic impact of Guillaume du Bellay, who is cited as an example after a storm marked by Panurge's futile entreaties.

==== Quaresmeprenant, enemy of the sausages ====
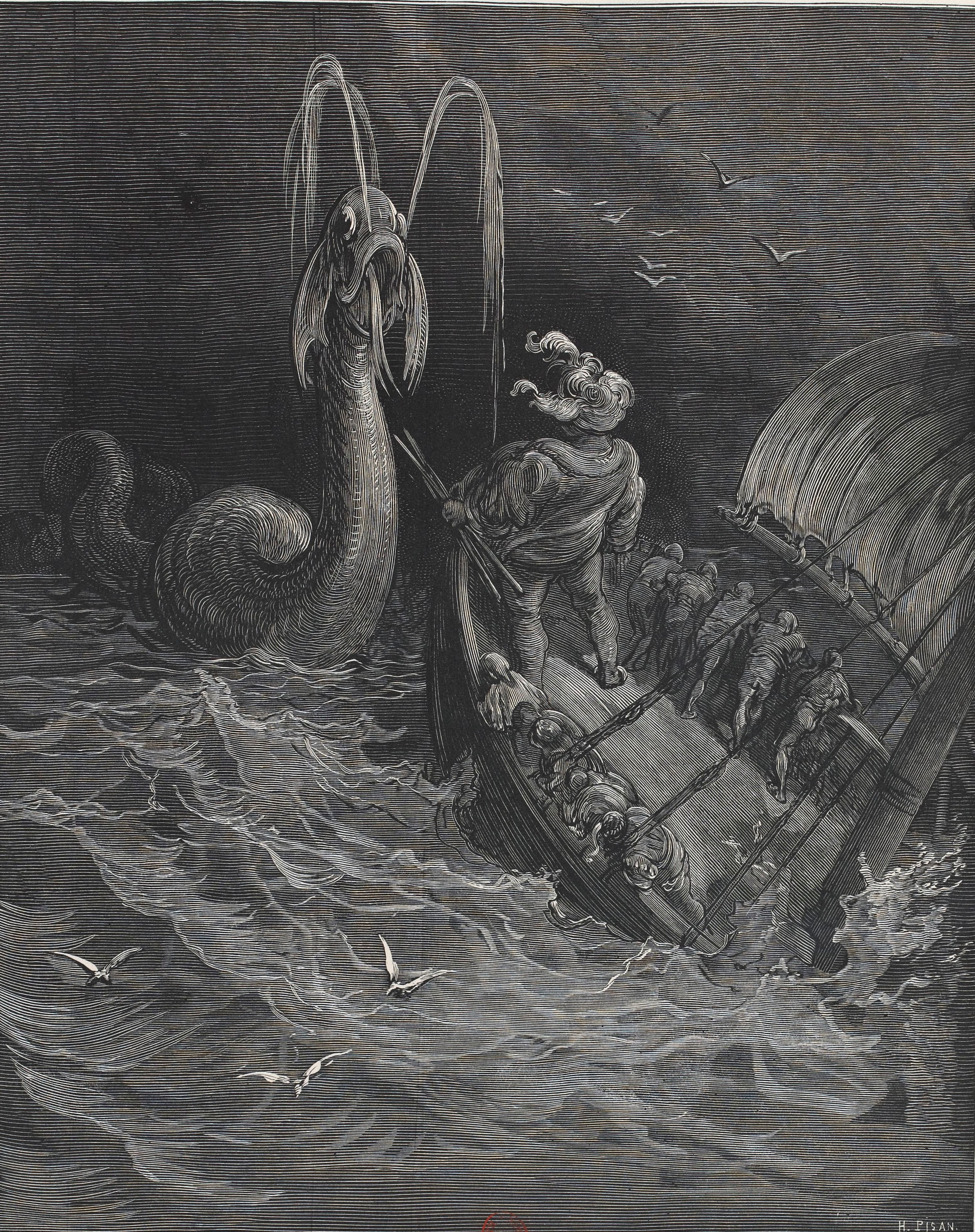
The Physetere is a monster associated with Leviathan by Panurge.

While sailing past the island of Tapinois without stopping, Xenomanes describes Quaresmeprenant, the island's master, at Pantagruel's request. The lengthy lists provide detailed descriptions of the anatomy and behavior of this character, who is described as a "very tall Lantern Bearer, standard-bearer of the Ichthyophages, dictator of the Mustardois, flogger of little children, and flatterer of doctors." (Note: Rabelais 1998, p. 297, Rabelais quote) The term Quaresmeprenant is typically used to refer to the three days preceding Ash Wednesday, which are observed as a period of festivity and indulgence. In this instance, Rabelais employs the term as a synonym for Lent, either out of respect for its etymological origins or as a deliberate play on the ensuing confusion. (Note: Rabelais 1998, p. 296, Note 2) This monstrous figure is distinguished by lethargy and passivity. The 78 internal and 64 external parts of his body, along with the 36 traits of his behavior, portray a grotesque figure that employs terminology derived from medicine and rhetoric (notably elements from Rhetorica ad Herennium). However, these references are subverted, as Quaresmeprenant cannot be visualized based on his description.

An immense marine reptile, equipped with a water jet propulsion system, suddenly appears on their route. While Panurge, terrified by the creature's gaping mouth and hellish appearance, already perceives himself as having perished and wails even more, Pantagruel displays his expertise by hurling beams at the creature's jaw, eyes, spine, and flanks, until it resembles the hull of a three-masted galleon. The creature then dies while flipping over. The physeter, likened to a monster represented on Olaus Magnus' Carta Marina, (Note: Rabelais 1998, p. 326, Note 1) is an obstacle associated with the Leviathan, and thus with evil, by Panurge. In contrast, Pantagruel's easy victory serves as a parodic demythologization.

The crew lands on the island of the Fierce Ones, where the Andouilles reside. This can be seen as a metaphorical evocation of the phallus. As they partake in the repast, Xenomanes elucidates that they are the adversaries of Quaresmeprenant. It has been impossible to reconcile them since the Council of Chesil, after which they were subjected to intense scrutiny and brought to trial. Pantagruel rises and observes the presence of numerous military units, positioned in a strategic ambush, accompanied by a variety of sausages, including those crafted from forest resources, substantial godiveaux, and horseback-borne sausages. He recommends exercising caution, as an armed reception could be a ruse, and he summons Captains Riflandouille and Tailleboudin, whose names foretell victory. This is followed by examining the relationship between words and things, as expressed in proper names. The Cratylic idea of a direct, deep, and tangible relationship between words and things is discussed, as well as the Pythagorean tradition of guessing disabilities or death based on the number of syllables in names. This final point resonates with Chapter XIX of The Third Book, which addresses the arbitrary nature of symbols. During the 16th century, it was widely accepted that names were originally analogous to their referents, a perspective shaped by the writings of Ammonius on Aristotle and Plato. (Note: Rabelais 1998, p. 352, Note 1)

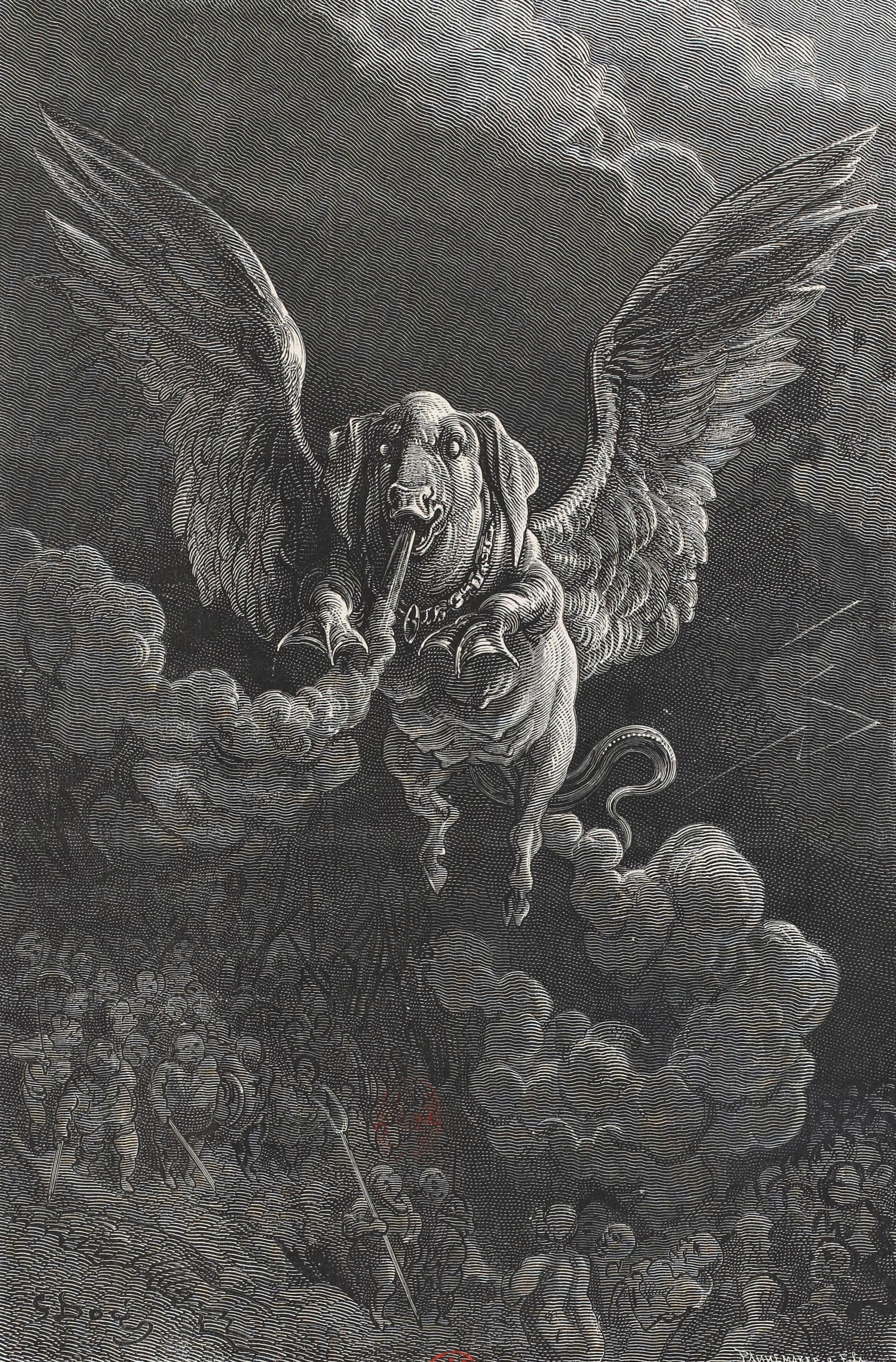
Mardi Gras, the god of Andouilles.

In this section, the narrator employs a persuasive and rhetorical style, invoking the language of a salesperson (Note: Rabelais 1998, p. 362, Note 1) to encourage the reader to view the andouilles in a more favorable light. The narrator draws parallels between the andouillic nature of the serpent in Genesis and the andouilles, reminding the reader of the historical association between Switzerland and sausage. Additionally, the narrator cites the example of Himantopodes, a fictional people of Ethiopia described by Pliny, as a testament to the enduring appeal of the andouilles. Frère Jean prepares for battle with the assistance of the kitchen staff, equipped with their implements, thereby contributing to the carnivalesque tone of this epic passage. (Note: Rabelais 1998, p. 366, Note 1) A device was constructed, which was referred to as the "great Sow", and which was capable of concealing an army similarly to that of the Trojan horse. Following the enumeration of the soldier-cooks, the narrative transitions to the battle. Gymnaste attempts to proclaim their peaceful intentions, but a substantial Cervelas instigates the engagement. The battle swiftly progresses in favor of the Pantagruelists. Subsequently, a sizable, adipose, gray, plumaged quadruped, adorned with crimson plumage and resembling to a flying pig, hurls barrels of mustard while vocalizing the exclamation "Mardi Gras" as the weapons ceasefire is observed. Queen Nipleseth of Andouilles requests pardon from Pantagruel. Intelligence reports had indicated the possibility of an attack by Quaresmeprenant. She presents him with tokens of her friendship and elucidates that the creature represents their tutelary god Mardi-Gras, the founder of their species, who came to provide them with balm. (Note: Mustard was a fecal symbol during the author's time.) Beyond the parodic elements, this episode contains allusions to contemporary political and religious events, with the Andouilles identified with the Protestants rebelling against Charles V. While the conflict revisits the traditional motif of the battle between carnival and Lent, neither side can be wholly assimilated to one or the other. For example, the Andouilles are compared to eels, food for lean days, which challenges the conventional association between Carnival and gluttony.

==== Papefigues and apimanes ====
The protagonists traverse the island of Ruach, which is inhabited by a people who subsist exclusively on winds, which they generate with fans or mills and consume with the discernment of gourmets. Pantagruel commends the uncomplicated nature of their way of life. The podestà elucidates that no aspect of existence is entirely blissful and that their circumstances render them susceptible to the slightest precipitation, not to mention Bringuenarilles, who habitually visited to procure their sustenance. The term Ruach is a Hebrew word that is defined as "wind" or "spirit" in the Brief Declaration. It is rich with multiple connotations in the Old Testament. The episode may allude to the sacramentarian movement in the Netherlands, for whom Christ's presence in the Eucharist is only spiritual.

On the following day, the party encountered the island of Papefigues, which had previously been known as the Gaillardets. One day, while the notables were engaged in a festival in the neighboring region of Papimania, one of them made a gesture resembling the act of eating figs (Note: This mocking gesture has an obscene meaning. The fig tree also symbolizes abundance in Christian tradition.) (Note: Rabelais 1998, p. 406, Note 1) at the portrait of the Pope. In response, the Papimanes invaded the island of the Gaillardets, subjected them to humiliation, and subjugated them. This reaction may be interpreted as a response to the repression of heresy, as well as a possible reference to the massacres that occurred in Mérindol and Cabrières in 1545. Nevertheless, it remains unclear whether the Papefigues can be identified with the Waldensians, who, in contrast to the Papefigues, were never free or wealthy but were instead excommunicated and marginalized. Furthermore, they eschewed public displays and held a particular aversion to processions. It is also possible that the Papefigues represent Jews. This is suggested by the fig tree, which is a symbol of Israel; the mention of bearded men; the participation of Roman Jews in the carnival; and the image of the empress riding backward on a mule, which evokes the anti-Judaic motif of the Jew riding backward and astride a sow. In a chapel, they learn the tale of a farmer and his wife who successfully outsmart the devil, who sought to seize their field.

Upon landing on the island of the Papimanes, four individuals approach them and inquire as to whether they have observed a figure they venerate to the point of idolatry, whom they refer to as "God on earth." This figure is none other than the Pope. The term, which has been used by canonists since the 13th century, refers to the authority of the Pope but is often perceived as having a scandalous connotation. (Note: Rabelais 1998, p. 428, Note 1) Their bishop, Homenaz, (Note: "Homme fort et bête" in Provençal refers to a strongman and beast.) welcomes them and first takes them to a church, where he shows them a gilded book, covered in precious stones and suspended in the air. This book contains the Decretals, which he claims fell from heaven (uranopetes) and were written by an angel. He offers them the opportunity to consult the book after a three-day fast, which they refuse, and to which Panurge responds with his usual quick wit.

Following the mass, Homenaz discloses a painting of the Pope that is concealed behind the altar. He asserts that the mere observation of this painting assures the remission of sins. Panurge notes that contemporary popes tend to favor the Persian tiara over the almuce. In response, the bishop asserts that military actions against heretics are justifiable. Subsequently, they proceed to a tavern to consume the proceeds of the collection. Following a considerable quantity of alcohol consumption, Homenaz delivers a lengthy and elaborate eulogy in praise of the Decretals. In response, Pantagruel's companions recount a series of unfortunate anecdotes about the Extravagantes and the Clementines. Homenaz also commends them for the financial contributions they make to Rome and the revenues they extract from the kingdom of France. He further suggests that the decretalists are well-suited for leading military campaigns, facilitating religious conversions, and administering the government. Upon their departure, the travelers are presented with a gift of fine pears, which Pantagruel contemplates planting in Touraine. This observation elicits a response from Frère Jean, who humorously suggests that the local population should be increased to facilitate the conversion of more individuals to Christianity. This pun is based on a real variety of pear, the "Bon-Chrétien." (Note: Rabelais 1998, p. 480, Note 1)

==== Frozen words ====
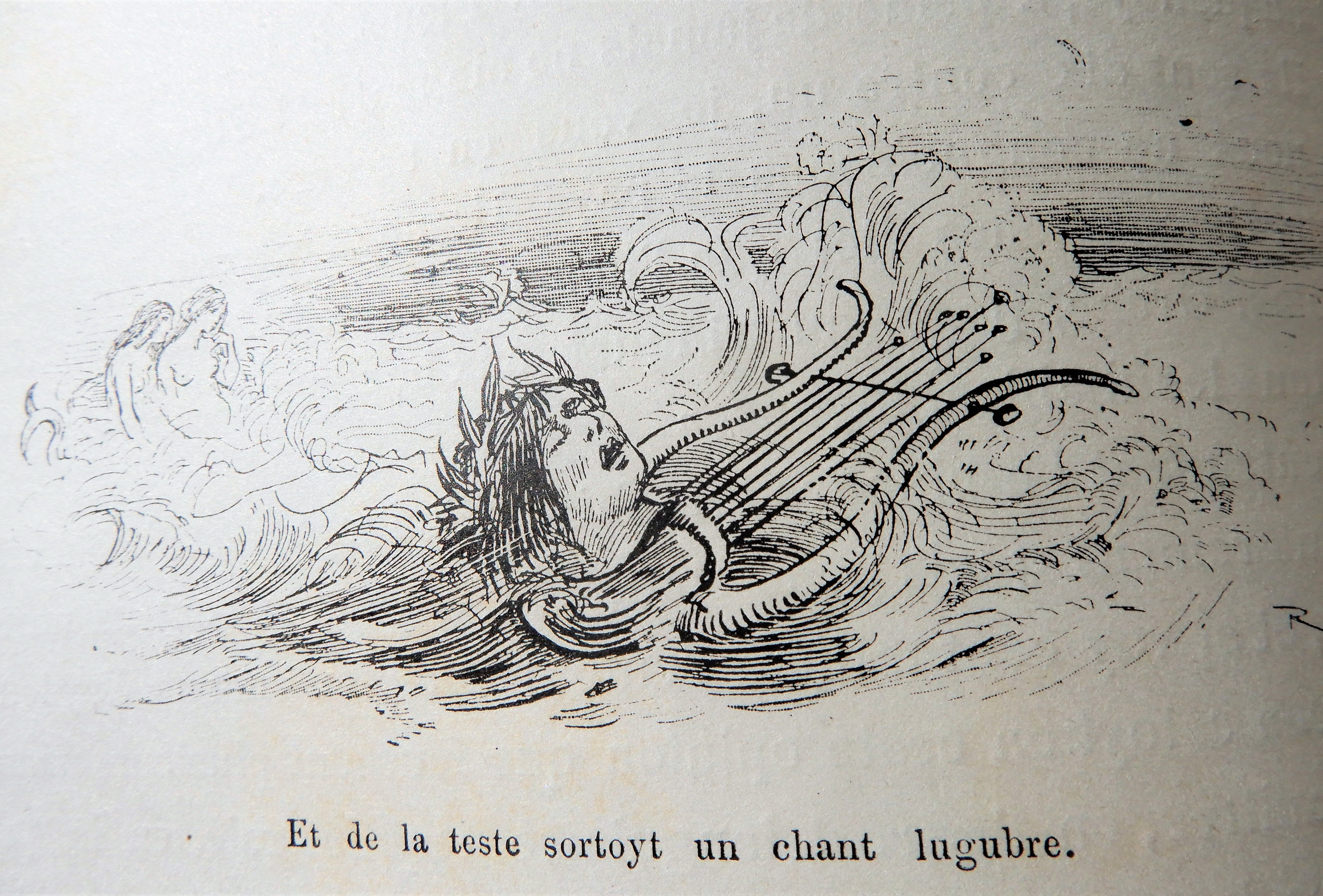
In Histoire de la divination, Auguste Bouché-Leclercq reports that Orpheus' head, buried at the end of its journey in Lesbos, the cradle of lyric, is said to have been giving oracles since the Trojan War. This oracular function of the severed head is mentioned in Philostratus' Life of Apollonius of Tyana (IV, 14).

Upon arrival in the Hyperborean seas, auditory evidence of human activity, including the voices of men, women, children, and horses, is discernible, despite the absence of any discernible visual presence on the horizon. It is possible to discern distinct words. Panurge proposes an immediate departure, whereas Pantagruel reassures him and proceeds to investigate the phenomenon through his scholarly expertise. He references the theory of the Pythagorean philosopher Petron, who postulated the existence of a veritable manor of truth situated at the center of numerous worlds. This locale is where words, ideas, exemplars, and portraits of all past and future things are said to reside. Additionally, the head of Orpheus is believed to drift on the sea, singing a mournful song accompanied by his lyre and animated by the wind.

The pilot provides an account of a significant confrontation between the Arismapians and the Nephelibates (Note: Nephelibate, meaning one who walks on clouds, is a term forged from the Greek νεφέλη (nephélê, meaning cloud) and βαήρ (baḗr, meaning walker). The myth of the conflict between the Arimaspes, who have only one eye, and the Griffons, who steal their gold, appears in Herodotus, drawing from Aristeas of Proconnesus.) that occurred during the previous winter season. With the advent of clement weather, the tumult of the battle gradually dissipates. Pantagruel then attempts to articulate the still-frozen words:

He threw onto the deck handfuls of frozen words, which looked like pearl dragees of various colors. We saw words of red, words of green, words of blue, words of black, and words of gold. As they warmed slightly in our hands, they melted, like snow, and we really heard them. (Note: Rabelais 1998, pp. 493–495)

— François Rabelais, Quart Livre, 1552

The companions are entertained by this sonic thaw, although the unpleasant and horrific sounds of the battle resound. The narrator recounts that he wanted to bring back some words of red preserved in oil, but Pantagruel pointed out the futility of preserving something as abundant and everyday as words of red among all good Pantagruelists. Reminiscences drawn from Antiphanes, Guillaume Postel, and Caelius Calcagninus underlie this episode, which should be read in connection with the episode of the Macraeons, for the evocation of relics, and the Andouilles, linked to the question of interpreting names.

— Quart Livre, 1552

The companions are momentarily diverted from the sonorous thaw, although the unpleasant and horrific sounds of the confrontation continue to reverberate. The narrator states that he attempted to preserve a few words spoken in oil, but Pantagruel highlighted the futility of preserving something as abundant and everyday as spoken words among all good Pantagruelists. This episode draws upon reminiscences from Antiphanes, Guillaume Postel, and Caelius Calcagninus. It should be read in relation to that of the Macræons, which evokes the remnants, and that of the Andouiles, which addresses the interpretation of names. (Note: Rabelais 1998, p. 486, Note 1)

==== Sir Gaster or the reign of the gut ====
Subsequently, they arrive at the island of Sir Gaster, the inaugural master of the arts in the world who resides in the castle of Arêtè, which is to say, of Virtue, and demands a challenging ascent. This king, who is deaf, issues commands through gestures and does not tolerate responses. He rules over both animals and powerful individuals in this world. His regent, Penia, which means Poverty, also instills fear because she is not constrained by any laws. The reference to the castle of Arêtè, described in Hesiod's Works and Days, is not without ambiguity. This place, which is only accessible after exhausting efforts, is neither an example nor a reward.

In the courtyard, Pantagruel exhibits a clear aversion to the Engastrimythes and the Gastrolâtres. The former assert that they are ventriloquists and deceive the populace with their purported divinations. The latter, who are devotees of their appetites, are conspicuous due to their indolence, fearful of causing themselves any discomfort. A portly gastrolatre, bearing a Manduce, (Note: The verb manducare means to grind with the teeth, chew, or absorb in Latin.) a carnival stick evocative of the Lyonnaise machecroûte, embellished with a colossal and absurd effigy, inaugurates a ceremony of offerings. The list of dishes and foods sacrificed to their pot-bellied god is then presented: fried bits, wild boar heads, pork loins with peas, squabs, grilled capons, multicolored dragees, and so forth. On days of limited food resources, the deity is satisfied with caviar, salted needlefish, flounder, moray eels, or even turtles and snails, all accompanied by drinks.

The fundamental contribution of Sir Gaster to human ingenuity can be attributed to the necessity of producing and preserving grain for sustenance. This has led to the advancement of numerous fields, including agriculture, blacksmithing, mathematics, military arts, navigation, architecture, and even techniques to master the elements. In response to the attacks launched by his adversaries, who were destroying his fortresses, he devised a method for reversing the trajectory of a cannonball using a magnet of siderite, a phenomenon that was presented as a natural remedy. This voracious ruler provides an ironic counterpoint to the Neoplatonism of Marsilio Ficino, who posits that it is love and not food requirements that inspire human creativity.

The inventions of Sir Gaster not only illustrate that the genesis of the arts and techniques is anchored in the necessity for sustenance—a concept that is not particularly novel. Subsequently, a chapter is dedicated to proven and historical innovations, which then take on an unrealistic and extraordinary turn. Instead of focusing on the siderite stone between the falconet and the page, the "balotte and dragees" propelled by the ballistic device revolve around it in a manner analogous to that of a celestial body. The narrative does not contain solely fanciful elements; it also mentions dictam, whose purported therapeutic properties were still acknowledged during the Renaissance. However, the imagination that pervades the narrative is both learned, playful, and experimental, suggesting in a playful manner that the world harbors unsuspected riches. This jubilant praise of ingenuity abolishes the distinction between utilitarian and contemplative intellectual works, as both respond to the reign of Gaster and open up perspectives of wonder as well as conquest.

==== Joyous banquet and Panurge's fright ====
The crew arrives near the island of Chaneph, (Note: Chaneph means hypocrisy in Hebrew.) where ascetic hermits subsist on alms bestowed by travelers. As the wind subsides, the passengers engage in a variety of pursuits while the vessel remains at anchor. Upon waking, Pantagruel is confronted with a multitude of inquiries from his companions. He responds that he will provide a single answer by sign to all of the requests, but that a hungry belly has no ears. He then requests that the meal be prepared first. Once at the table, the doubts and questions of the guests have disappeared; table talk flows, and after having "raised the time", the wind blows again. This meal, which can be read as the antithesis of Thélème, is rich in eschatological allusions to the Last Supper.

At last, they approach the island of Ganabin, which is inhabited by a population of thieves and rogues. The island is topped by a rock formation that resembles Mount Parnassus in Phocis. Panurge, overcome with trepidation at the prospect of disembarking on solid ground, unlike Brother Jean, seeks refuge in the hold. To play a practical joke on him, the monk suggests saluting the Muses with the firing of a cannon, which is imitated by the rest of the fleet. Panurge emerges from the hold in his shirt, chattering his teeth, with a shiny cat attached to the bottom of his breeches, named Rodilardus. In response to Pantagruel's inquiries, the timid individual claims that he perceived the feline to be a malevolent entity, which has subsequently inflicted scratches upon him. He vehemently refutes any suggestion of trepidation, exclaiming, "What is this?" One might inquire as to whether this substance can be designated as fire, brimstone, excrement, filth, desolation, fecal matter, excrement, lair, waste, disturbance, smoke, excrement, scybale, or spyrathe. "It is saffron from Hibernia." These two words conclude the novel. While late 19th and early 20th-century commentators like Jean Fleury or Alfred Glauser perceive a sign of dull fatigue in this scatological outburst, more recent critics reveal its allegorical implications and allusive nature.

The epilogue elucidates several motifs frequently associated with Panurge and present in the preceding novels or Le Quart Livre, except for in which he is absent. These motifs include fear, excrement, saffron, the devil, and wine. In The Third Book, the devils are deterred from approaching Panurge, who is depicted as "saffroned and bedraggled". (Note: See Chapter XXIII of The Third Book, "How Panurge makes a speech to return to Raminagrobis.") He encounters numerous fears, both real and imagined, including cuckoldry and the imminent threat of a storm. This conjunction of elements serves to reinforce the conclusive value of the final chapter, whose concluding sentence refers back to the beginning of the Pantagruelian adventure. Panurge, his garments shredded by the cat Rodilardus, is prepared to don new ones.

The term Sela, as defined in the Brève déclaration (Brief Declaration), is a Hebrew term of biblical origin. Its use in a burlesque context is thought to have originated with the jests, which are fanciful illuminations in the margins of Gothic manuscripts. The term is primarily used in the Psalms, yet its precise meaning remains obscure. Some commentators have proposed that it should be translated as "amen". The final sentence of the novel, when detached from the tirade, is not attributed to Panurge and may be spoken by an anonymous individual. Nevertheless, this linguistic fiction evokes the Jewish parodies that Rabelais may have been familiar with, contributing to a grotesque and learned humor that is irreverent in the face of the mysteries of the Holy Scriptures.

=== Brief declaration ===
The Brief Declaration of Some More Obscure Words Contained in Le Quart Livre of the Deeds and Heroic Sayings of Pantagruel, or Brief Declaration, is a lexical appendix that was added to the 1552 edition. The inclusion of definitions that appear surprising, erroneous, or impertinent has prompted questions regarding the text's veracity. In essence, this glossary aligns with Rabelais's linguistic preoccupations, including an affinity for etymology, a keen interest in dialects, and a disinclination towards errors in spoken language. (Note: Rabelais 1998, p. 588, Note 1) Therefore, the definition of "cannibal" as "a monstrous people in Africa, having a face like dogs, and abounding in a place of laughter" does not align with the meaning attributed to the term by Peter Martyr d'Anghiera, who characterized the cruel inhabitants of the Antilles. Instead, it underscores the author's focus on the etymological roots of the word, canis.

== Genre and structure ==
=== A journey under the sign of myth ===
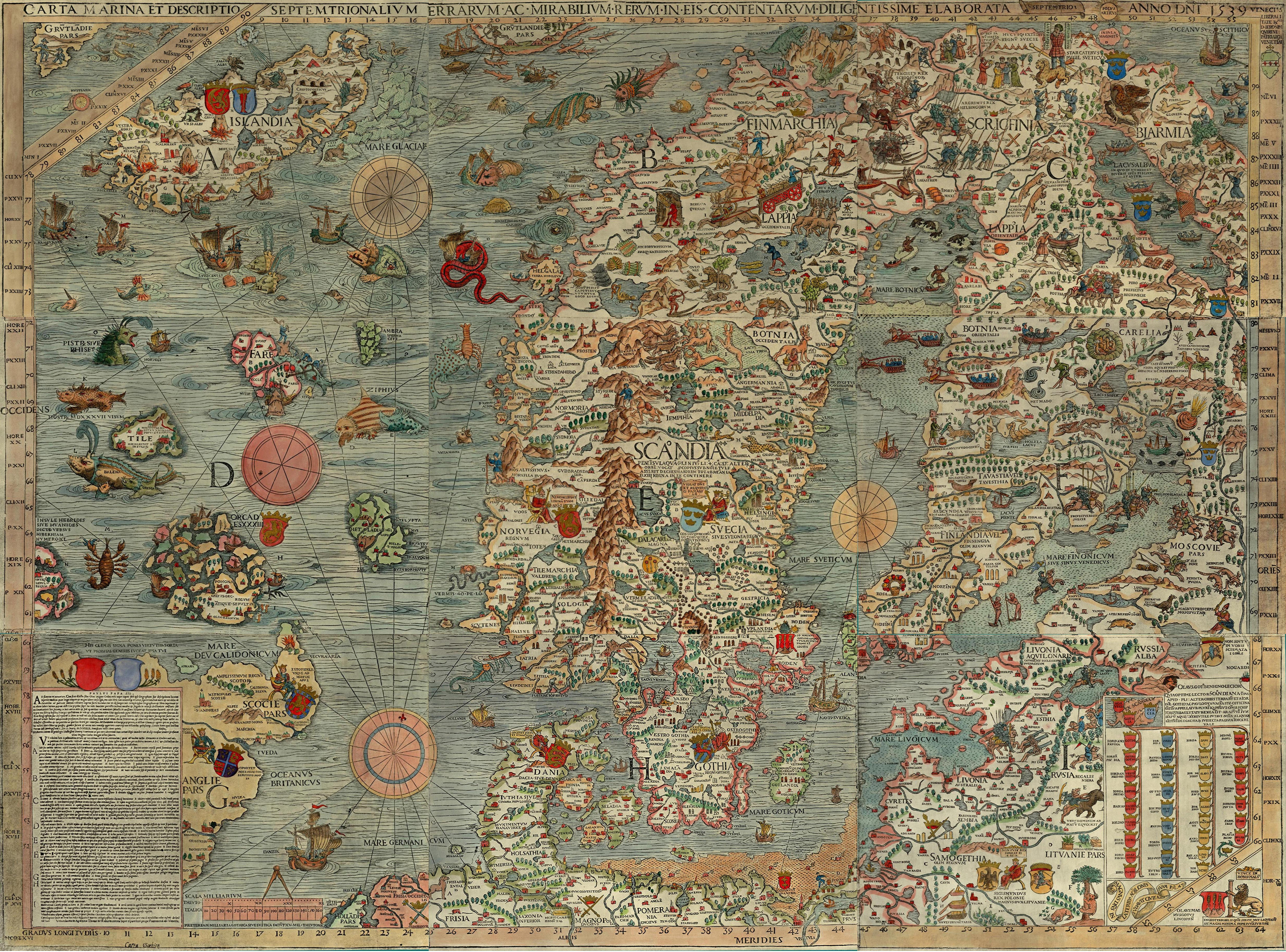
On the Carta Marina, west of the island of Fare (the Faroe Islands), a monster topped by the inscription " Pistr[is] sive phiset[er] " threatens a ship, while to the south a petrified monk could be an omen of storms.

The novel makes its presence known by using lexical elements about navigation and meteorological conditions, thereby establishing its status as a travel narrative. The narrative commences at the fictitious port of Thalasse, situated in proximity to Saint-Malo. The travellers embark on a quest to reach the temple of the Divine Bottle in Cathay, which is geographically proximate to China. The ship named the Thalamège in the novel is a reference to the vessel described in Ptolemy Philopator's account, but it is equipped with sails that were previously mentioned at the conclusion of The Third Book. The pursuit of a northern route to the Indies resonates with contemporary concerns and invites comparison with the voyages of Jacques Cartier. Nevertheless, literary critics such as Abel Lefranc and Marius Barbeau have endeavored to decipher a route. However, the implausibility and incoherence of the journey contradict this claim to realism, despite some places refer to existing toponyms. Rather than referring to proven explorations, the framework of the travel narrative is a literary device that allows for the staging of otherness and presents European realities in a new and strange light.

While the Rabelaisian vocabulary demonstrates a technical mastery of nautical knowledge, the account of this navigation is disorienting in spatial, temporal, and linguistic terms. The winds mentioned do not correspond to the ship's direction, and the itineraries scarcely converge. Additionally, temporal allusions and the internal chronology of the novel lack coherence. Furthermore, the lexical and stylistic registers intermingle more than in previous novels. In comparison to the 1548 edition, the 1552 edition represents a notable intensification of this blurring of references, as evidenced by the increased intermingling of the marine vocabulary of the Ponant and the Levant, as well as the erasure of the title Calloier des Îles Hyères, which was closely tied to the geopolitical context of the era.

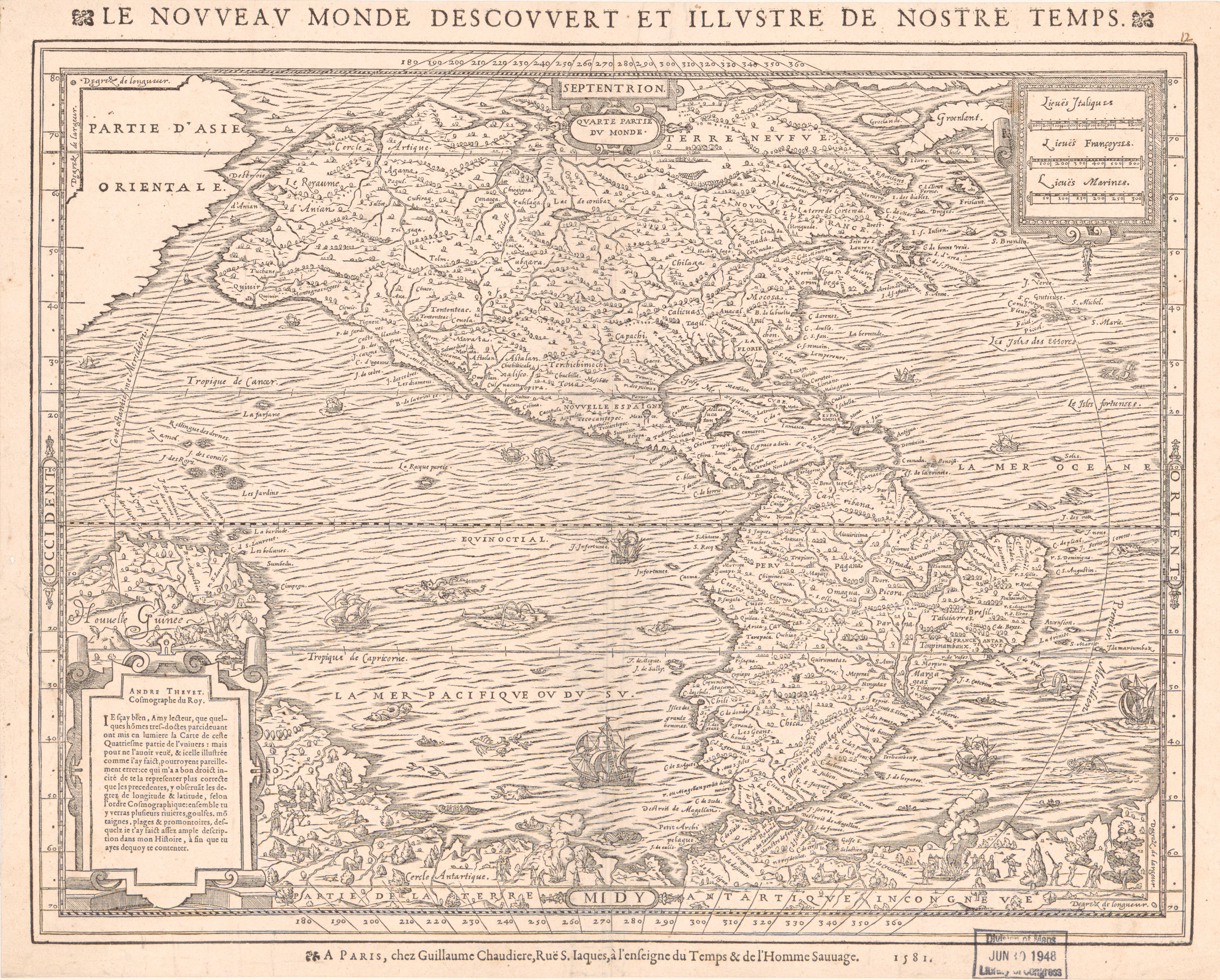
Several detailed analogies have been drawn between Macraeons Island and Devils Island, described in André Thevet's Cosmographie, which describes an island prey to demonic forces, or Guillaume Postel's De Orbis concordia, which refers to a species of Nordic demons with pathetic moans. Île aux Diables, or Devil's Island, was a mythical archipelago off the coast of Newfoundland in the 16th century. (Note: Rabelais 1998, Prologue de Michelle Huchon)

A defining feature of travel narratives is their pervasive fascination with novelty, which fuels the creation of cabinets of curiosities. The protagonists disembark at the island of Medamothi to view a selection of "exotic and peregrine" commodities, the term "exotic" being a neologism in the French language. The stalls are distinguished by the presence of luxurious and sensational objects. The assemblage of unparalleled artifacts represents a fundamental tenet of the humanist conception of travel, driven by an inherent desire for knowledge. Following the storm, Pantagruel elucidates to Macrobe that the objective of their expedition is praiseworthy and not mercantile. The documentation of the vestiges of the island of the Macréons is consistent with this perspective. The episode of the frozen words illustrates that these significant and memorable realities are inherent to each individual, which justifies the omission of verbal reports. Memories derived from explored lands may lack novelty in and of themselves but may gain significance when contextualized. For instance, the pears offered by Homenaz, which are cultivated in Touraine, retain their novelty despite the lack of new information about them. This example illustrates the practices of botanists of the time, as evidenced by Rabelais's role in sending seeds from Italy to Geoffroy d'Estissac and Guillaume Pellicier. The gift of local curiosities also corresponds to a political issue aimed at promoting the donor and strengthening the ties with the beneficiary, as illustrated by the exchange between Pantagruel and Niphleseth. The initial fascination with the strange gives way to a distancing from the imaginary constructions fueled by travelers, as evidenced by Le Quart Livre.

If the concept of exoticism evokes feelings of awe and admiration, the presence of artificial, implausible, or familiar objects suggests a satirical commentary on the unverifiable narratives of travelers. In this context, the island of Medamothi, which translates literally as the "island of nowhere", is associated with Ouy-dire in The Fifth Book. This is a motionless monster covered in ears that is responsible for disseminating false information throughout the world. In this way, the concept of exoticism in Rabelais can be seen to relate to a fascination with the inventory of the world and a sense of disappointment regarding the perceived scattering of its elements. It is not yet the result of an encounter with the other that invites reflection on one's civilization, as illustrated by the later reflections of Jean de Léry following his discovery of the Tupinambas in Brazil.

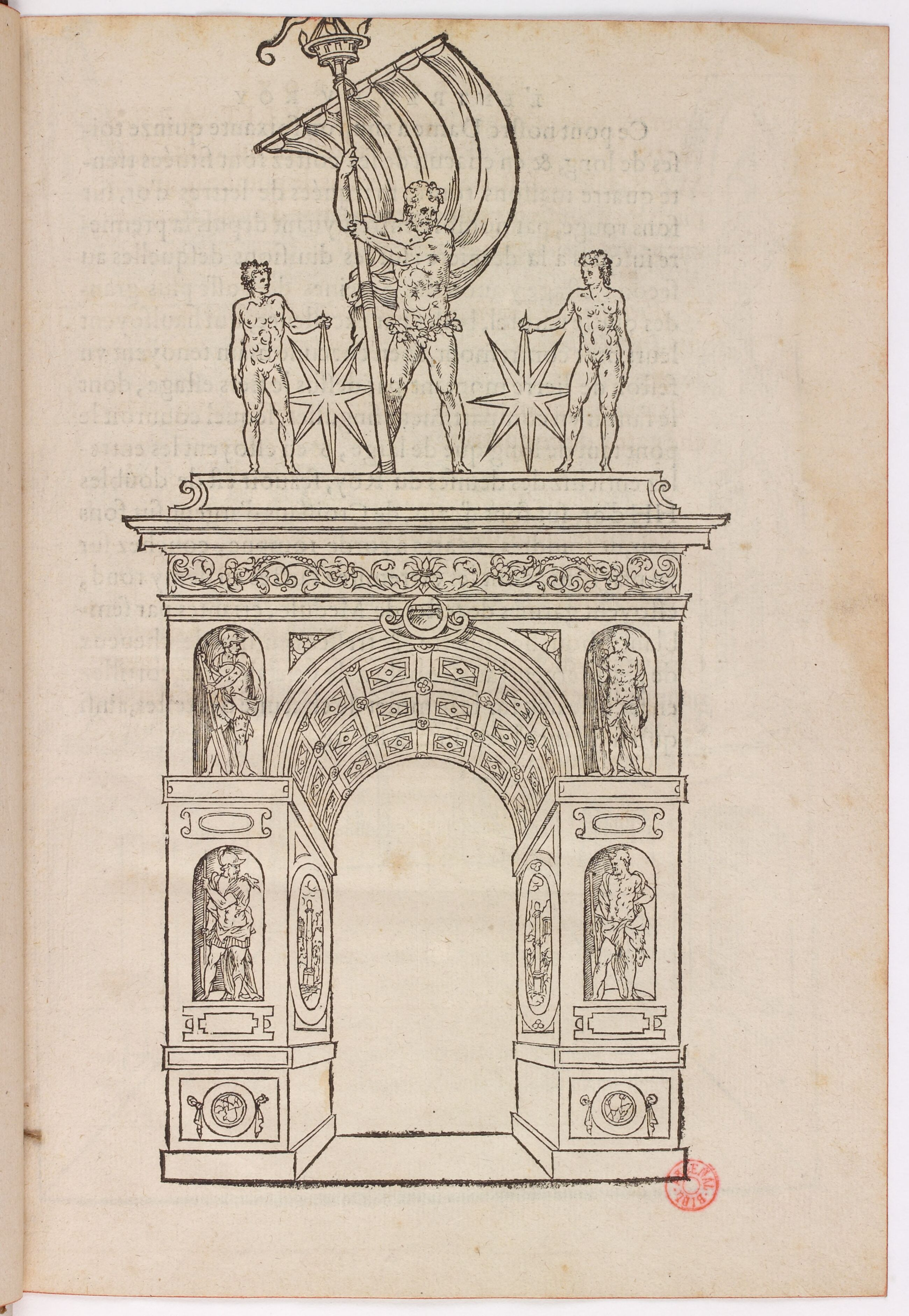
The triumphal arch celebrating Henri II's entry into Paris, built by Philibert Delorme and others at the end of the Pont Notre-Dame, shows that the Argonauts myth was used to celebrate French royalty.

The objective of the journey is twofold: firstly, to facilitate Panurge's quest and secondly, to seek counsel from the oracle of the Dive Bouteille. However, the narrative's dynamics are also shaped by the character of Pantagruel, who poses the majority of the questions designed to elucidate the enigmas of the islands. The pilgrimage is motivated by a desire for knowledge, as the giant explains to Macrobe, while Dindenault is punished for pursuing mercantile objectives. Pantagruel demonstrates tolerance and generosity towards the islanders he encounters. He cultivates a curiosity that is moderated by the humility he espouses, which is informed by a skeptical and evangelical perspective. This is in contrast to Panurge's vain knowledge. The rejection of a material motive in favor of a spiritual mission aligns with the discourse of other contemporary travelers, such as the naturalist Pierre Belon and the cosmographer André Thevet, as evidenced in the preface to Cosmographie universelle.

The dedication to Cardinal Odet de Châtillon signals the continuation of the Pantagruelian mythologies. As defined in Breve déclaration, the term "mythology" refers to a set of fabulous narratives and allegorical fictions that conceal a hidden meaning. The journey north evokes that of the Argonauts after the conquest of the golden fleece, as described in the Orphic version. The myth of the Argonauts, explicitly mentioned in the novel, directly refers to the political tribulations of the time, as illustrated by the order emphasized by Charles V or the depiction of Henry II under the guise of Tiphys.

Le Quart Livre of 1548 appears to follow the route of the Argonautica according to Apollonius of Rhodes, traversing the Caucasus and the Black Sea. In contrast, the version of 1552 seems to be more influenced by the Orphic Argonautica, where the ship reaches the hyperborean lands before returning along the Atlantic coast. Nevertheless, despite the evocation of the ram with the golden fleece, the episode of Dindenault is more closely aligned with Folengo's narrative and does not recount the return of the expedition. It is only indicated at the outset of the novel that the voyage lasts four months. The unfinished Argonautica by Valerius Flaccus, published in 1498 and completed by Giovan Battista Pio in 1528, may also have influenced Rabelais in his blurring of maps by providing an implausible junction between the Atlantic and the Mediterranean.

=== Composition ===
In his analysis, Frank Lestringant draws a parallel between the structure of the novel and that of an insular map, a term that was previously used to describe a collection of maps exclusively devoted to islands. The stages are juxtaposed without regard for connection, and only the concern for composition imbues the toponyms with a sense of depth. The progression of the voyage persists in its discontinuous nature, engendering a sense of arbitrariness that is more pronounced than that experienced on a more defined route traversing solid ground. Each island is the subject of a micro-narrative that serves to unify it. This narrative device lends a repetitive quality to the stops, which appear to have no definitive endpoint. It seems that no progression alters the course of the adventure, as if an ongoing, unfinished inquiry were substituting for the protagonists' quest. Nonetheless, the narrative progression within each episode precludes the succession of discoveries from being reduced to a monotonous device. The stakes and the meaning of each of them transform the whole into a journey. The exploration progresses from a cosmographic perspective, encompassing oceanic spaces, to topographical viewpoints attentive to the particularity of places. The integration of Canadian, Aegean, and Scandinavian references in developing these imaginary lands demonstrates that this geographical palimpsest is more akin to a labyrinth than a path defined by a beginning and an end.

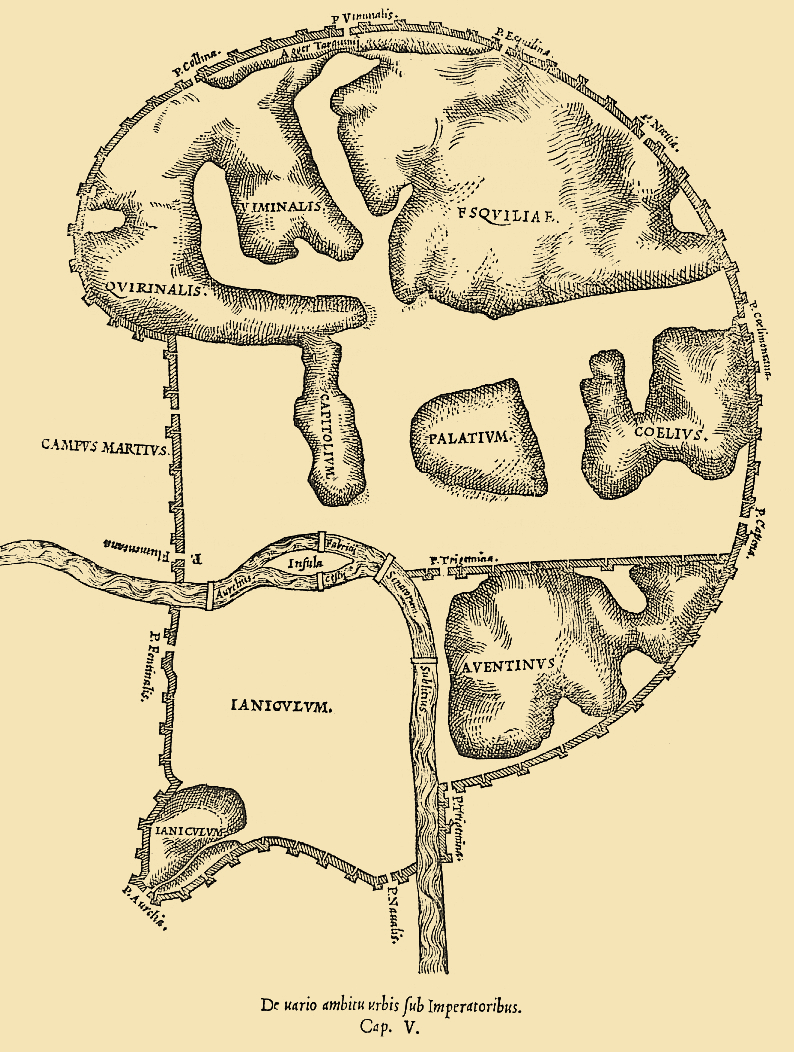
According to Gérard Defaux, Ganabin is none other than Rome, which is not only one of Rabelais' targets but also plays a structuring role in the architecture of the story.

Paul J. Smith identifies thematic consistencies in the imaginary travel narrative that ensure the novel's coherence. At the outset of the narrative, the travelers engage in a musical performance of Psalm 114 in its Marot translation, thereby establishing an analogy between the Pantagruelian quest and the wanderings of Israel in search of the Promised Land. The presence of the Exodus has been interpreted in various ways, with some associating it with the crisis of the Church and evangelical aspirations for a return to paleo-Christian rites. This therefore signals the sacramental concerns that traverse the journey. The storm, a second topos of marvelous navigation, follows the pattern of Psalm 107, although it also includes references to ancient traditions and humanist ideas. These include the unleashing of the waves, imploration, divine intervention, return to calm, relief of the crew, and arrival at port. Despite its theological implications, the text differs from the biblical source not only in its comedic dimension but also in its alignment with the cosmic conceptions of the Renaissance, as evidenced by its interpretation on the island of the Macræons. The depiction of the wind, which is absent in the storm and therefore equated with chaos due to its role in generating excessive movement, is also relevant to this theme. The harmony of favorable winds is situated between two extremes. The third common motif of the genre, the sea monster, is depicted stereotypically as a fearsome creature before being presented in a parodic manner as a centipede and a large fish. The diminishment of this epic motif aligns with the diminished perception of the term "monster" during the 16th century, as articulated by Ambroise Paré in his account of the whale in Des monstres et des prodiges. In this final volume, sea shells, remoras, and blue flyingflish appear, as they do in the Rabelaisian novel. The marine fauna is noteworthy for its admirable qualities, even when it is not fantastical. The evocation of the sperm whale plays with the polyphony of the monstrous register, functioning as a sign, an extraordinary phenomenon, and a natural curiosity.

Gérard Defaux, who is critical of Lestringant's thesis, proposes that a less elaborate concentric structure comparable to The Third Book can be discerned in the composition of Le Quart Livre. The 14 stops, equivalent to the number of consultations of Panurge in the previous novel, are distributed evenly in the two halves of the 67 chapters of the 1552 edition, with the fight against the sperm whale at the center, according to a scheme of 33 + 1 + 33. The battle against the monster is situated under the sign of the Trinity. It is reasonable to consider that this device relies on the symbolism of numbers in a Christian perspective, namely 3, 7, and 14, although the latter is less transparent. In his Topography of Ancient Rome, which was prefaced by Rabelais in 1534, Bartolomeo Marliani notes that the city of Rome, established on seven hills and divided into fourteen regions, had thirty-four gates. This observation is particularly relevant in light of the attacks against the papacy. In addition to this concentric structure, the stages oppose and draw closer, establishing more or less independent island links to the whole. This is demonstrated by the examples of Tapinois and Farouche, Quaresmeprenant and Niphleseth, or the Papimanes and the Papefigues. A dual ascent towards the grotesque, horror, and terror reaches its zenith with the intensified fanaticism of Homenaz and the tyranny of the belly of Sir Gaster. This progression elucidates Pantagruel's shifting demeanor: curious on the island of Medamothi, ironic with the Papimanes, and revolted near the island of Chaneph.

Furthermore, the characterization and actions of the protagonists contribute to the establishment of narrative coherence, aligning with the conceptualization of moral narrative as outlined in Art Poétique François by Thomas Sébillet. This moral narrative does not constitute an axiological discourse; rather, it concerns typology, verisimilitude, and the consistency of morals and characters. The concept of decorum personarum, borrowed from Horace and subsequently reworked by Renaissance theorists, requires that characters be appropriately aligned with their status and condition. From this perspective, the characters are not subordinated to the progression of the plot, contrary to what is advocated by Aristotelian poetics. Rather, the action enhances each character's properties. This characterization is conveyed both through abstraction, as illustrated by Quaresmeprenant, and through individualization, particularly concerning Pantagruel and his companions. Brother Jean's propensity to swear serves as a marker of his ethos.

The didactic interventions that frame or insert themselves into the narrative of the journey recall the metatextual discourses associated with ancient epic poetry and, more broadly, with the humanist edition of ancient texts. This is exemplified by the commentaries of Servius on Virgil or Eustathius on Homer. The reflection on proper names that opens in chapter 37, when the captains Riflandouille and Tailleboudin are summoned, thus recalls statements similar to those developed in the preface of a posthumous work by Du Bellay printed in 1569, Xenia, seu illustrium quorundam nominum allusions. The Rabelaisian self-commentary, while firmly situated within a scholarly tradition, also assumes a parodic quality, with comic allusions juxtaposed against serious references.

=== An allegorical narration permeated by polysemy ===
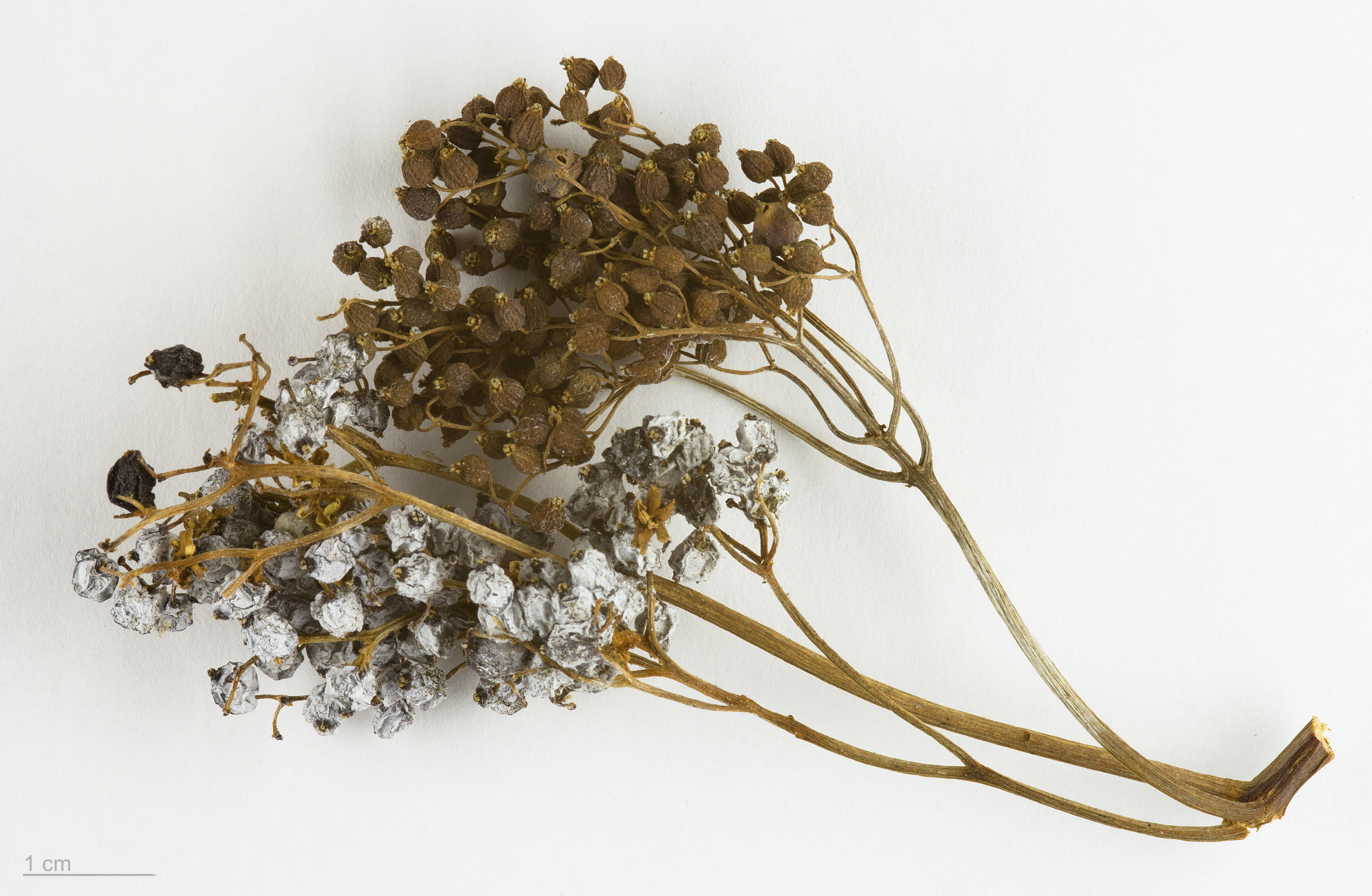
On Messire Gaster's island, referring to Pythagorean symbols, the narrator evokes the allegorical dimension of the elder tree, which is said to be of better quality for making flutes in countries where the rooster does not crow. This allegory would mean that studious people are invited to abandon vulgar, immediate music in favor of celestial, less accessible music.

The elimination of the principal narrator reflects the internal tensions of the narrative, which is traversed by two complementary pairs of oppositions. On the one hand, the actions of Panurge serve to correct Pantagruel's discourses. On the other hand, the perspective of a quest is disrupted by the caprices of navigation and the unpredictability of encounters. Indeed, this intradiegetic narrator generally confines himself to recount the course of events, thereby allowing the characters to assume a dominant position within the narrative. This represents a departure from his role in the first two volumes of the Pantagruelian saga, where he played the part of either an obsequious servant or a braggart mystifier. He presents himself as a witness and guarantor of authenticity, supported by a lexical field that is consistent with the conventions of a travel narrative. His use of humor and the reader's engagement with his credibility instead illustrate his command of the text and prompt insight, as he states in chapter 38: "Believe it if you will; if you do not want to, go see for yourself." The narrator's assertions of veracity are not necessarily indicative of his reliability. His claims frequently exhibit the characteristics of a charlatan, often accompanied by ironic nuances and amplified during the most implausible episodes. Through their exaggeration, his statements parody the conventions of geographical literature.

In this way, Frank Lestringant encourages an examination of the islands as geographical allegories, wherein their heterotopic dimension enables the staging of a distinct otherness, designed to stimulate the imagination and evoke a sense of wonder. From this perspective, the island of Papimanes represents a perverted form of Catholicism, characterized by worldly prosperity, idolatry, and the expectation of a pope who is assimilated to the Messiah. The initial inhabitants of this locale who encounter Pantagruel present an illustrative representation, as they include a monk, a falconer, a solicitor, and a winemaker, corresponding respectively to the clergy, nobility, legal professionals, and commoners. This personification attests to the symbolic and moral dimension of the episode.

The distinction between allegorical and non-allegorical passages is occasionally indicated by comedic or absurd elements within the narrative. The Y-shaped formation selected for the assault on the Physètère is, from a tactical standpoint, an illogical decision. However, from a symbolic perspective, the letter evokes a crossroads, underscoring the pivotal role of this episode. Indeed, the battle can be viewed from a theological perspective. The Leviathan, associated with the Physetère, corresponds to an infernal being from a mystical point of view. The Grand Admiral is in charge of the maritime provinces of Hell. Additionally, Pantagruel is amalgamated with Christ through Perseus. This is in accordance with the Christianization of this Greek myth during the Renaissance. The fifty spears planted in each flank of the monster would symbolize the triumph of the Church, with this number evoking Pentecost.

Both the characters and the narrative itself are open to a range of interpretations, including both praise and ridicule, in a style reminiscent of Rabelaisian fiction. The allegorical dimension of the narrative, which encourages readers to discern a hidden meaning behind the surface details, is less pronounced in this novel than in the previous one. However, this shift towards greater polysemy allows for a more nuanced understanding of the text. The interpretations of Pantagruel are juxtaposed with those of Panurge and the other characters, yet the meaning of the adventure remains undetermined and plays no structuring role. To illustrate, Messire Gaster initially appears to personify the abstract concept of the ambivalence of things, conveyed through a prosaic reality. This reality is that of the stomach's power, which can be seen to be both a source of enslavement and emancipation. Nevertheless, no value scale is explicitly prioritized over another. This is evidenced by the fact that Pantagruel's disgust does not diminish the fascination exerted by this culinary display. Furthermore, the truculence of Panurge and Brother Jean is not diminished by the quest for truth animating the giant, who is also capable of participating in the jokes and pleasures of the table.

The text's satirical aspect, manifested in the blending of tones and identifying a target, contributes to its hermeneutic complexity. The novel's conclusion, where scholarly satire and unbridled farce converge, calls for a nuanced interpretation. This is exemplified by the episode involving Messire Gaster, where the material and the spiritual are juxtaposed. In the novel, Panurge, who has been scorned and displays a tendency to boast, reclaims a quality that had been largely absent in The Third Book: ambivalence. This generic hybridity allows for an open interpretation of the text, synthesizing the literal and figurative senses, the trivial and the refined, the playful and the serious.

== A humanist satire ==
The term "satyricque mocquerie" is defined in Briefve declaration as "a manner of speaking ill of everyone for pleasure, and blazoning the vices, just as one does in the games of the Bazoche, through characters disguised in satire." From this perspective, Rabelais's satirical register aligns with the Horatian spirit of caustic criticism of the defects of the time, particularly regarding the adversaries of humanists. He adopts the analogy developed by Sébastien Brant in La Nef des fous between the doctor and the satirist, as well as the idea that the latter must apply his methods to himself.

=== A perverted justice ===
In her novel, the author focuses on the actions and corrupt practices of those in the legal profession. The episode of the Chicanous, which takes place on the island of Procuration, provides an exemplary illustration of this perversion of justice. The satire aligns with its etymological sense related to mixture, encompassing the intertwining of narratives, cross-borrowing from different theatrical genres such as farce and tragicomedy, and the interweaving of dissimilar themes including the religious and the scatological. However, the satire is not without ambiguity. The people of Lord Basché are not exempt from criticism. Furthermore, as Epistémon notes, the Chicanous act on behalf of the prior, and their cruel fate stems from an injustice that paves the way for a cycle of violence.

=== Abuse of the clergy and antipapism ===
Religious satire is a prominent feature of Rabelais's fiction, and it also plays a significant role in Le Quart Livre of the Lives of the Ladies of Lyon. The contrast between the Papefigues and the Papimanes is a satirical commentary on the idolatry of the pope. The interactions between the devil and the peasant provide opportunities for Rabelais to make jabs at the lust of the monks, as well as to satirize other aspects of society, including the greed of lawyers, the deceit of merchants, and the cunning of chamberlains.

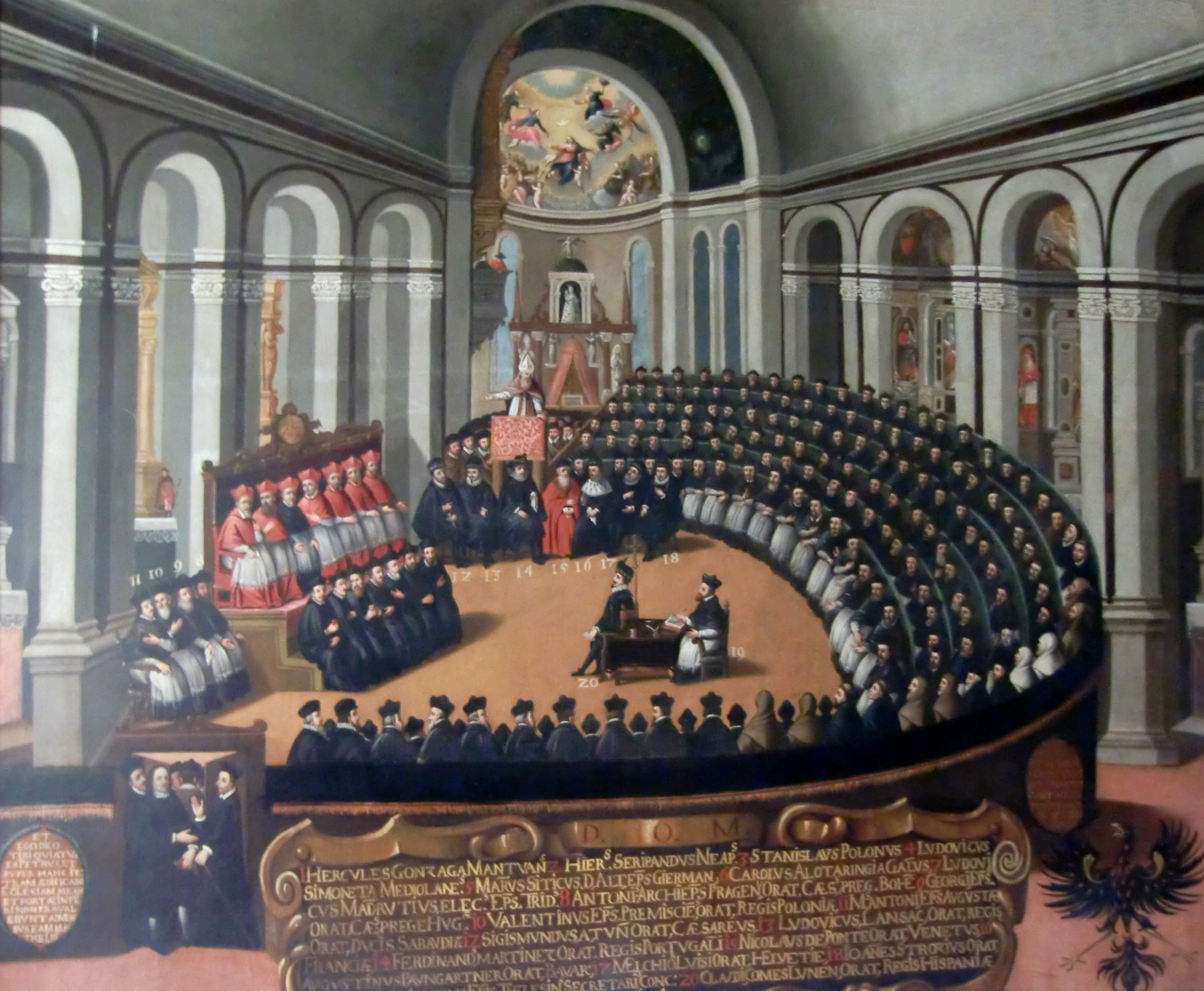
While France's overall relationship with the Council of Trent was complex, several attitudes coexisted with Rabelais' satirical position, such as Guillaume Postel's Gallican humanism or, on the contrary, Cardinal Charles de Lorraine's abandonment of intransigent Gallicanism.

The veneration of the decretals on the island of the Papimanes undermines the authority of canon law, which is regarded as superior to Christian charity. These texts, developed by Gratian in the 12th century, protect the clergy against the authority of civil and royal powers. Bishop Homenaz thus espouses a view that the Bible should be superseded by a substitute text. The attack on the decretals also occurs indirectly in the episode of the Chicanous, as evidenced by the condemnation of the wearing of terrifying costumes during church performances and the lending of religious garments for recreational purposes. By making these critical allusions, Rabelais mocks the immunity of the clergy and the distinction between the clergy and laypeople. The critique of the sacralization of the Pope, the rituals of the Mass, and the objects of liturgy aligns with that of the Reformed. The portrait of the Pope is admired for external signs like the tiara and slippers, rather than for his posture and humility.

The Papimanes serve as a transparent allegory of papists, symbolizing the enhanced clarity of Le Quart Livre in comparison to the preceding novels. These earlier works were characterized by hermeneutical intricacy in the prologue of Gargantua and by the perplexing actions of Panurge in The Third Book. This quality is consistent with aesthetic and historical considerations related to literature of combat. In this context, Homenaz asserts that they are "simple folk, since it pleases God." "And we call figs, figs; plums, plums; and pears, pears", he conveys a simplistic attitude that refuses to see the ambiguity of signs and reflects his literalist reading of sacred texts. The Papimanes espouse a binary vision of the world devoid of doubt, consider their salvation as guaranteed, and place less trust in an incorporeal and invisible God than in His representative on Earth. The lucidity of Rabelais's discourse can be attributed to two factors: its propagandistic objective and the intention to defend Gallicanism against the proponents of the Vatican's primacy. The estimation of the annual capture of 400,000 ducats from the Kingdom of France by Rome is consistent with the understanding that such figures were likely subject to a certain degree of exaggeration at the time. It is also noteworthy that enemies and allies are explicitly identified, such as Calvin and Putherbe, who are referenced among the deformed children of Antiphysie at the conclusion of the Quaresmeprenant account. The polemical implications of the satire contribute to the text's overall ambivalence.

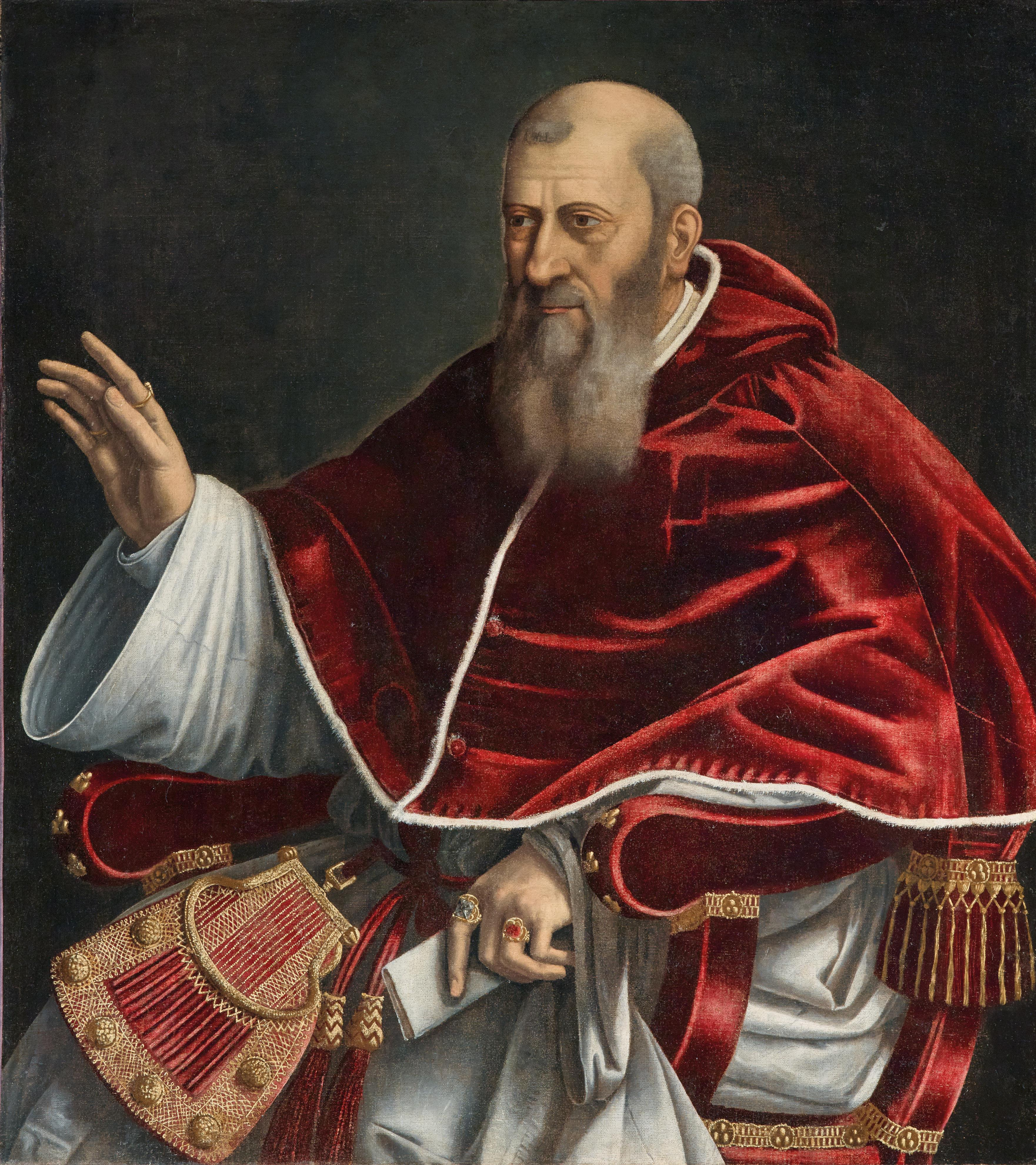
Criticism of the decretals took place against the backdrop of the Gallican crisis of 1550-1551. In particular, it targets Julius III, who represented canon law at the Council of Trent while serving as papal legate to Paul III, an untenable position for evangelicals and Protestants.

The satirical work does not espouse an unambiguous rejection of religious practices, as evidenced by the multifaceted portrayal of prayers in the novel. The Papimanes embark on a quest during a dry Mass, in which there is no offertory, which contravenes the liturgy. Furthermore, they use money for the pleasure of the table. Furthermore, they engage in ostentatious and superstitious behaviors, such as kissing their thumbs in the shape of a cross. In contrast, the propitiatory ceremony that precedes the departure to sea, Couillatris's simple faith, and Pantagruel's prayer during the storm evince sincere religious fervor. During this episode, the repeated invocations of the terrified Panurge offer a comic counterpoint to Pantagruel's brief supplication. The latter demonstrates humble trust in divine will, which he reaffirms before Macrobe.

In addition to criticizing the Catholic Church for its teachings on papism and the abuses of the clergy, the narrative also challenges the doctrine of the Eucharist, particularly within the context of Christianity. The ceremony is designed to recall the Last Supper and the communion of Christ with His disciples. However, the meaning of this ritual is distorted, as evidenced by the episode centered around Messire Gaster. Indeed, the ceremony celebrating him mocks the travesty of the Christian rite. For example, the transport of the ciborium and cruet by the acolytes is replaced by the delivery of baskets and pots by large servants. The Gastrolâtres engage in a parody of the Mass, in which they participate in the act of sacrifice. Humanists have been quick to criticize the fixation of Eucharistic communion in a series of rules and chants that are followed without reflection. They have also been vocal in their opposition to the interpretation of this sacrament as a sacrifice and the idea of the real presence of Christ in the water and wine, which they believe allows for the redemption of the faithful in a manner reminiscent of a pagan rite. From this perspective, the seemingly unfinished nature of the novel is explicable. Panurge's hope placed in the word of the Dive Bouteille is as illusory as the hope for salvation through ingesting the host.

Panurge's curses, associated with the devil and the farce of François Villon, evoke the devilries of medieval mysteries. In these mysteries, characters embodying diabolical roles tormented the damned, a practice that was met with great delight by the audience. Furthermore, these characters did not hesitate to leave the stage to spread a carnival racket throughout the city. Nevertheless, the devils of Le Quart Livre also serve a satirical purpose. The scene in which a peasant from the island of Papefigues is immersed in holy water like a duck while priests read a grimoire mocks the prevalent exorcism practice during that period. The mention of the damned being cooked and eaten in Hell by the tormentor of the peasant or by Homenaz subverts the popular imagery of the sufferings awaiting the damned, thereby challenging superstitious beliefs.

=== A muted or militant evangelicalism? ===
The evangelicals, defined by their aspiration to disseminate the biblical message to the widest possible audience in the vernacular without compromising their stance vis-à-vis the papacy, enjoyed the support of Francis I before the Affair of the Placards. The subsequent struggle against heresy witnessed a intensification of repression, as evidenced by the edict of January 13, 1535, which prohibited printing. This development significantly constrained the scope for action of the evangelicals.

In his work, Verdun-Léon Saulnier offers support for the thesis of Rabelais's hesychasm, which may be defined as an attitude of renunciation of active propaganda, akin to quietism, and a desire to live in peace. From this perspective, the polemical ideas of Le Quart Livre would be presented with caution and under the seal of secrecy to avoid persecution. This is suggested by the expression "secret garden", which recurs several times in the novel. Consequently, he identifies a symbol of autonomy in the cannon shot fired in front of the island of Ganabin, which would not serve as a haven for criminals but rather as a representation of flawed justice and oppression. (Note: Saulnier notes that Panurge's terror could not solely be explained by the presence of thieves, despite what the term ganabin covers in Hebrew. Panurge clarifies to Frère Jean that he risks nothing as a monk, which supports the hypothesis of an allusion directed against agents of religious authority.) This gesture reflects Pantagruel's tranquil prudence, in contrast to the cowardice of Panurge's flight and the audacity of Brother Jean's readiness to take up arms.

In contrast, Gérard Defaux maintains that Rabelais' visceral anticlericalism is expressed without embellishment, despite power did harden its stance toward heretical thoughts as early as 1534. The preface to Le Quart Livre of 1548, in addition to the episode of the war between the jays and the magpies, represents a plea accompanied by an indictment that does not resemble a retraction. The allusions and personal attacks against the dogmas of the evangelists are precise, direct, and supported. Michael Screech states that while the novel aligns with the political line of the King of France and the politico-religious context flourishes more than in previous works, the propagandistic dimension is only one among others, as evidenced by the passages that are primarily entertaining and comedic.

== Interpretations ==
=== A novel on language ===
==== Scholarly and irreverent uses of wordplay ====
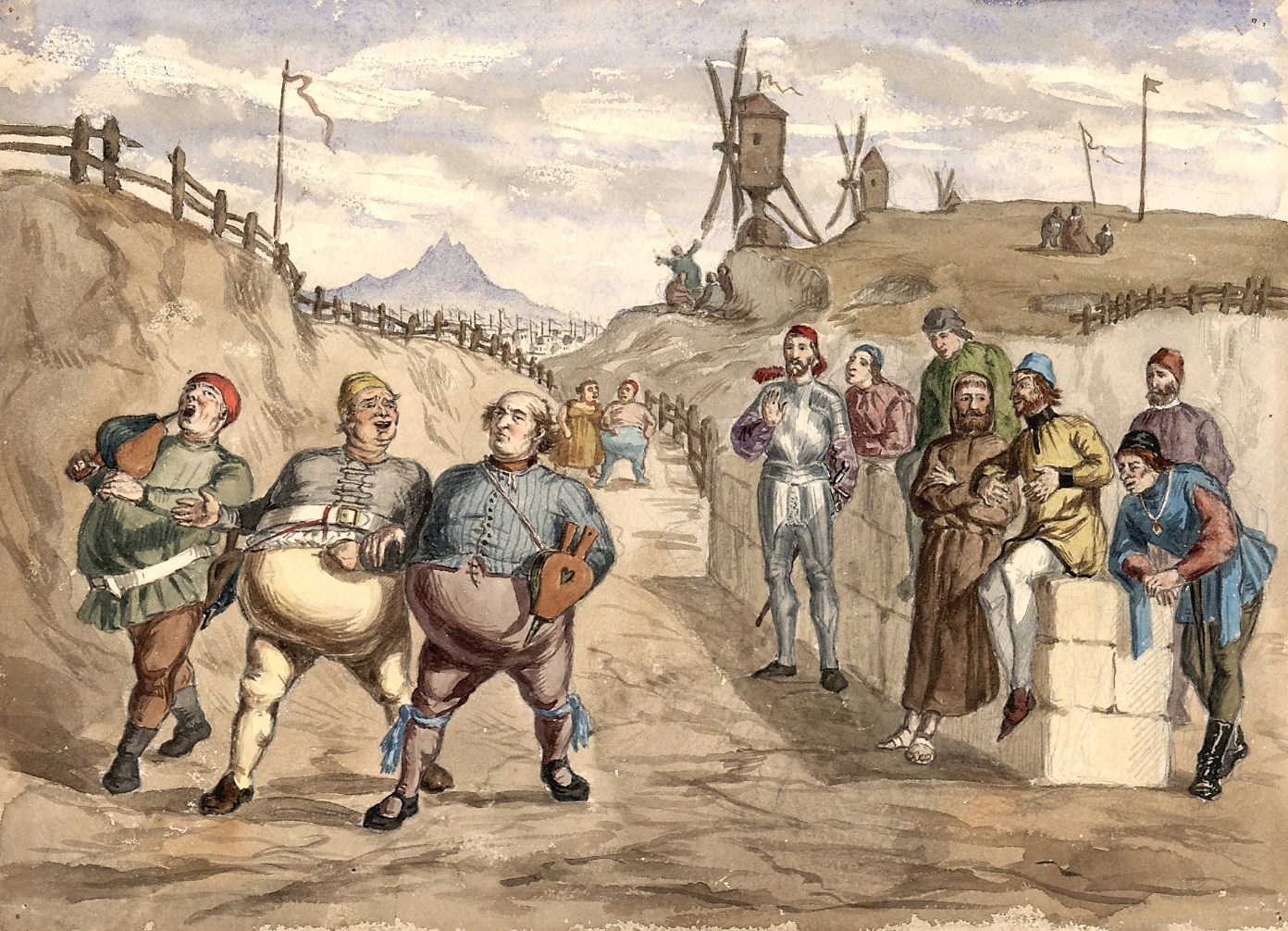
In Pantagruel's words, "ne vivre que de vent" suggests both simplicity and inconsistency, too much detachment from concrete things. Painting by Maurice Sand.

The motivation behind the lexical turns gives rise to the question of responsibility and the gratuitousness of language. Indeed, several narrative episodes are predicated upon misunderstandings or the presence of double meanings. Upon Couillatris's request for his axe, Priape provides an elaboration on the sexual ambiguity of the word. This is followed by a burst of laughter from the gods, which Couillatris likens to a "microcosm of flies". The gods then subject Couillatris to a test. Similarly, the podestà of Ennasin nearly frustrates Pantagruel when he takes Panurge's jest literally and fails to recognize the artificial nature of the connections he establishes. Among the Allianciers, the unions are primarily elucidated through the reconstruction of fixed expressions, once the terms have been individualized and embodied. Such usage results in a loss of commonality and a self-sufficiency of the symbol that exasperates the giant. For example, the words "horn" and "muse" form the word "bagpipe". Antiphysie, which reuses the conventional images of human dignity to invert them, or the Papimanes, who literally worship the "god on earth" through effigies, also exemplify this aporia of symbolization, as do the puns. The impact of wordplay along the narrative demonstrates the idolatry of signs.

The function of semantic games as a narrative device is particularly evident in the reinterpretation of proverbs. The literal interpretation of a fixed metaphor is a prevalent technique in Rabelais's work. The novel's originality lies in the staging of these expressions, as illustrated by the island of Ruach, where the phrase "to live only on air" is exploited throughout the episode. The suction cups serve to cure the windy colics of the deflated. The phrase "to break sausages over the knees", which serves as the title for chapter 41, denotes the prowess of the Pantagruélistes, who can produce the seemingly impossible. Additionally, the proverbial statements are personified on the island of the Allianciers. To illustrate, the characters of the cart and the shovel evoke the permutable proverb, "The cart mocks the shovel." (Note: The fourgon is an instrument used to stir the embers in an oven. He mocks the shovel for the darkness with which he himself is covered.) Rabelais reframes the established meaning, invigorating words as evidenced by the episode of frozen words. The proverbial diversion thus serves to structure the narrative, infuse it with a playful impetus, and explore the potentialities of language.

The use of the apophthegm corroborates this dual aspect of playful jest and reflection on language. Panurge, blinded by his egocentrism, thus distorts an attribute to Pyrrhon about a pig happy to be on the shore in the middle of a storm. However, all versions of this story mention the animal on the boat, which is a symbol of stupidity. (Note: Rabelais 1998, p. 224, Note 22) Furthermore, there is no evidence that Panurge is capable of questioning himself, a characteristic of skeptical philosophy. In contrast, Pantagruel employs the apophthegm for didactic purposes, to edify and encourage his companions. Moreover, he eschews the dogmatic use exemplified by Panurge, while still utilizing the device for comedic effect. In both instances, the apophthegm serves as both a means of appealing to an argument from authority and a reflection of its problematic nature.

To fully comprehend Rabelaisian lists, it is essential to consider both their internal narrative logic and their relationship to the hypotexts to which they refer. These lists are embedded in a tradition that is well-represented in medieval literature. Le Quart Livre incorporates four enumerative sequences, including the anatomy of Quaresmeprenant, the repast of the Gastrolatres, venomous animals, and the cooks of the war of the Sausages. The latter, comprising 161 nouns that function as proper names, recurs to the lexical field of food. One-third of these words appear to lack a direct connection to the domain of nourishment. However, the obscurity of some of these terms may be attributed to the evolution of the language, as evidenced by the term "Balafré", which denotes a dialectal form of the verb "bâfrer." The apparent intruders are explained by etymological acrobatics or plays on signifiers. For example, the surname "Lasdaller", which means "lazy", fits into the list because it is an anagram formed by "lard" and "salter". The list exhibits poetic effects through isometry (alternation and homology of syllable count in the different word sequences) and homoeoteleuton (Cabirotade and Carbonnade or Badigoncier and Saffranier). This verbal accumulation, on the one hand, refers to reflection on the work of language and the adequacy between name and thing. Additionally, it participates in creating a heroic-comic style, as evidenced by its parody of the enumerations of armies frequently found in epics. This is demonstrated by the allusions to Batrachomyomachy and the Iliad.

The onomatopoeias in Le Quart Livre are more numerous and longer than in previous novels, and they imbue the epic register and the quest for the origin of language, which also runs through the narrative, with a comic turn. While some of Rabelais' onomatopoeic interjections are similar to those of ancient or contemporary grammarians like Scaliger, the majority are original creations. Furthermore, he employs this trope with great exuberance, even spanning multiple lines, and is not averse to rendering animal sounds that circumvent rhetorical conventions. This is exemplified by the first written meow in the French language, (Note: In response to Homenaz's hypocritical tears, Epistemon and Brother Jean exclaim "Myault, myault, myault." See Chapter 54.) and he also indulges in consonantal sequences that evoke a confused sound devoid of meaning (the sequence of "r" pronounced by Dindenault). The erratic vocalizations render Panurge's fear palpable in the episode of the storm. In contrast, the flood of onomatopoeias that bursts forth during the melting of frozen words evokes more the Babel-like confusion of languages and the era's questions regarding primitive speech.

==== The thawing of speech ====
A discourse on interpretation can be discerned in the background of the final four sequences of Le Quart Livre. In the episode of the Papimanes, Homenaz represents a fixed and rigid conception of language, mired in the sensible and the literal, whereas Pantagruel, open to polysemy, does not fear lexical innovation, as illustrated by the naming of the pears received as a gift. Upon reaching the frozen words, he does not hesitate to formulate several hypotheses regarding their meaning, in contrast to his companions, who are rendered speechless by what they hear without seeing, and the captain, who reduces the extraordinary phenomenon to the memory of a past battle. Moreover, by eschewing the accumulation of words, he illustrates that language is constantly recreated through the dynamic of life, whereas Panurge attempts to manipulate speech as an object, proposing to bestow it (like a lover) or sell it (like a lawyer). The character of Messire Gaster also exemplifies the duality of the sign and the evils of literalism. Those who accept the primary meaning of hunger live in a state of obsession with their stomachs. However, hunger possesses a creative function because it awakens the imagination. During the final banquet, the companions express satisfaction with the lack of resolution to the riddles and celebrate their physical restoration. Pantagruel, however, identifies a lack of flexibility in their thinking, which he attributes to their voracious appetites. He proposes to "raise the time" not only through drinking, which is a traditional expression among sailors, but also by allowing time to pass, thereby once again exploring the polysemy of the term.

The concept of capturing the image of words or sounds in ice can be traced back to Rabelais. In his writings, Plutarch cites Antiphon's observation that Plato's teachings manifest as frozen words, their meaning gradually becoming apparent with the passage of time and the acquisition of wisdom. Furthermore, Castiglione's Courtier references a similar phenomenon observed during an extended stay in Muscovy. However, Rabelais employs this theme in a distinctly particular manner. He presents a Christian interpretation of the myth of Petron as described by Plutarch in the treatise On the Disappearance of Oracles. The ancient narrative asserts that the Ideas (Lógoi) and Exemplars (Paradeígmata) placed in celestial triangles partially spill into the temporal world through the movement of eternity. In Pantagruel's version, the words descend from the domain of truth until the "consummation of the Age", a term derived from the Gospel of Matthew to describe the end of times. From this perspective, the episode of frozen words deals with the part of revealed truth contained in words despite their conventional dimension, as well as the possibility of knowledge through language, which aligns with certain assertions from the Cratylus regarding the nature of language. In this context, words are seen as participating in a divine light that is said to have been bestowed upon humanity. They are regarded as "noisy vehicles of opinion", capable of conveying the truth in a way that is both distinctive and effective. In this interpretation, chapter 56 represents a comic counterpart to the preceding chapter. Once thawed, the words reduce to mere sounds and unintelligible voices where an unknown language mingles with the noise of war. Outside of language touched by grace, confusion, and misunderstandings prevail, with the only sounds bearing natural significance resembling the noise of beasts.

Chapter 56 is the setting for a linguistic conflict. Therefore, Panurge is primarily attuned to the materiality and perception of the sign, a quality shared by the majority of his companions, who are attached to the sensible qualities of speech. In contrast, Pantagruel is willing to distort meaning to interpret it figuratively. Nevertheless, it is not evident that one perspective necessarily prevails over the other. Before the pilot's intervention, Panurge correctly identified the sounds of a battle but perceived an imminent threat. Pantagruel, on the other hand, discerned the freezing and thawing of words without offering a suitable rationale. Rabelais not only engages with the nature of signs, but also with their utilization. Panurge ascribes an indexical value to words that incite him to flee; in contrast, Pantagruel regards them as signs that offer material for reflection. However, it is crucial to avoid an overly interpretive approach to the episode of the frozen words, as it also illustrates the arbitrary nature of the sign. The characters convey their conception of this incredible phenomenon at the expense of the narrator, and the whimsical nature of the fiction takes precedence over rationalizing claims. The colors of heraldry and the science of symbols recall the conventional character of the meaning attributed to the sign, and Pantagruel's final hypothesis regarding Orpheus's song evokes the poetic dimension of the frozen words.

==== Sound, between cacophony and a sign of life ====
The evocation of the sounds of the world, which indeed permeates the novel, should not, however, be read unilaterally in a negative light. In addition to the episode of the frozen words, the devilry of François Villon gives rise to a noisy hubbub, with actors parading through the city with their cymbals and bells, the wedding of Basché set to the sound of musical instruments, and a cannonade concluding Le Quart Livre. From Dindenault's clucking to Panurge's moans, the onomatopoeic utterances delineate the character of the uttering figures while simultaneously underscoring the text's playful aspect. Beyond its intrinsic linguistic interest, the narrative thus manifests an interest in the acoustic value of the sign and exalts living speech, in contrast to the sometimes (but not exclusively) unfavorable representation of print at several points in the plot. This portrayal of writing as an inert entity devoid of vitality when not supported by a reader is a recurring theme throughout the novel. As in the other novels, Rabelais includes numerous allusions to music, although he does not present an original and in-depth conception of musical theory. The episode of the frozen words illustrate a concept of sound atomism, whereby the freezing process preserves not only the material aspect of the sound but also the timbre and pitch, thereby endowing the sound with a quality that engages the senses beyond that of hearing. According to a procedure he is accustomed to, the writer combines the evocation of musical form with a more trivial reality. In this instance, Pantagruel comments on Panurge's flatulence, stating, "I acknowledge the counterpoint of the music you produce through your nose."

=== Ambivalence of Rabelaisian comedy ===
==== A tragic-comic farce ====
Rabelaisian writing employs a multivalent linguistic strategy whereby the comic register serves to disguise a serious message, and vice versa. The obscene ambiguities evoke the joviality of Carnival and the conviviality of evangelism, as evidenced by the intertextuality between death and laughter in the novel. The mortal traps that Dindenault and Tappecoue encounter subvert and satirize characters who are invested with their authority. However, the violence of these episodes is offset by the humanistic perspective of the Pantagruelists. The cruelty of Panurge and Villon is not condemned by a moral lesson, which helps preserve the lightness of these tragic farces. Instead, it is sanctioned by the symmetrically measured behavior of Pantagruel. The narrative of Couillatris's axe espouses a philosophy of mediocrity, which is understood as a just measure between two extremes. This is conveyed without resorting to didacticism, but rather through a satirical portrayal of a massacre in which greedy peasants are the victims. The laughter of Rabelais is multifaceted, with the joy of Pantagruelists contrasting with the malevolent joy of the tricksters. The instances of death resulting from laughter enumerated in the catalog of strange deaths in chapter 9, derived from a compilation by Ravisius Textor, can be regarded as a form of retribution for self-love or an affirmation of joy even in death.

The phantasmagorical nature of the episode of Basché is dependent upon the successive embedding of narratives, which increase the impression of their unreality. The inversion of values exemplified by the Chicanous, who are envied when they are illegally beaten and lamented when punished for their sacrilegious theft, illustrates the significance of the carnival as a social phenomenon. This is corroborated by the pervasive presence of wine, which is associated with celebration and a bacchanalian excess where social norms appear to be suspended. Épistémon observes that it is the instigator of the disputes, the Prior, who should be punished rather than the executors, the Chicanous. However, this incidental remark serves as a moral standard that does not impede the exuberant chaos of the narrative.

Rabelais employs tragicomedy techniques in a manner that challenges the boundaries of a codified genre, instead positioning it as an experimental concept. As defined in the Brief Declaration, tragicomedy is a "pleasant farce at the beginning, sad in the end". This genre is exemplified in the island of the Macræons and the trick played on the Chicanous. The concept is also employed by poets, as evidenced by Antonio Minturno's commentary on the ambiguous nature of Plautus's Amphitryon, and in vernacular literature, as illustrated by the preface to Théodore Beza's Abraham Sacrificing, which specifies the dual character of his play. The uncertain nature of the journey is effectively blended with the concept of ambivalence, as exemplified by the diptych of Bringunenarilles and du Bellay. In these works, death is represented successively as both a comic and tragic farce, reflecting Rabelais's penchant for ambivalence. Similarly, the portrayal of violence culminates in horror for the Chicanous and beauty for the Andouilles. As presented in the prologue as "a joy of spirit confected in contempt for trivial things", Pantagruelism can be regarded as a mindset to cultivate in the face of the uncertainty of the future, whether textual or not.

==== Teratology ====
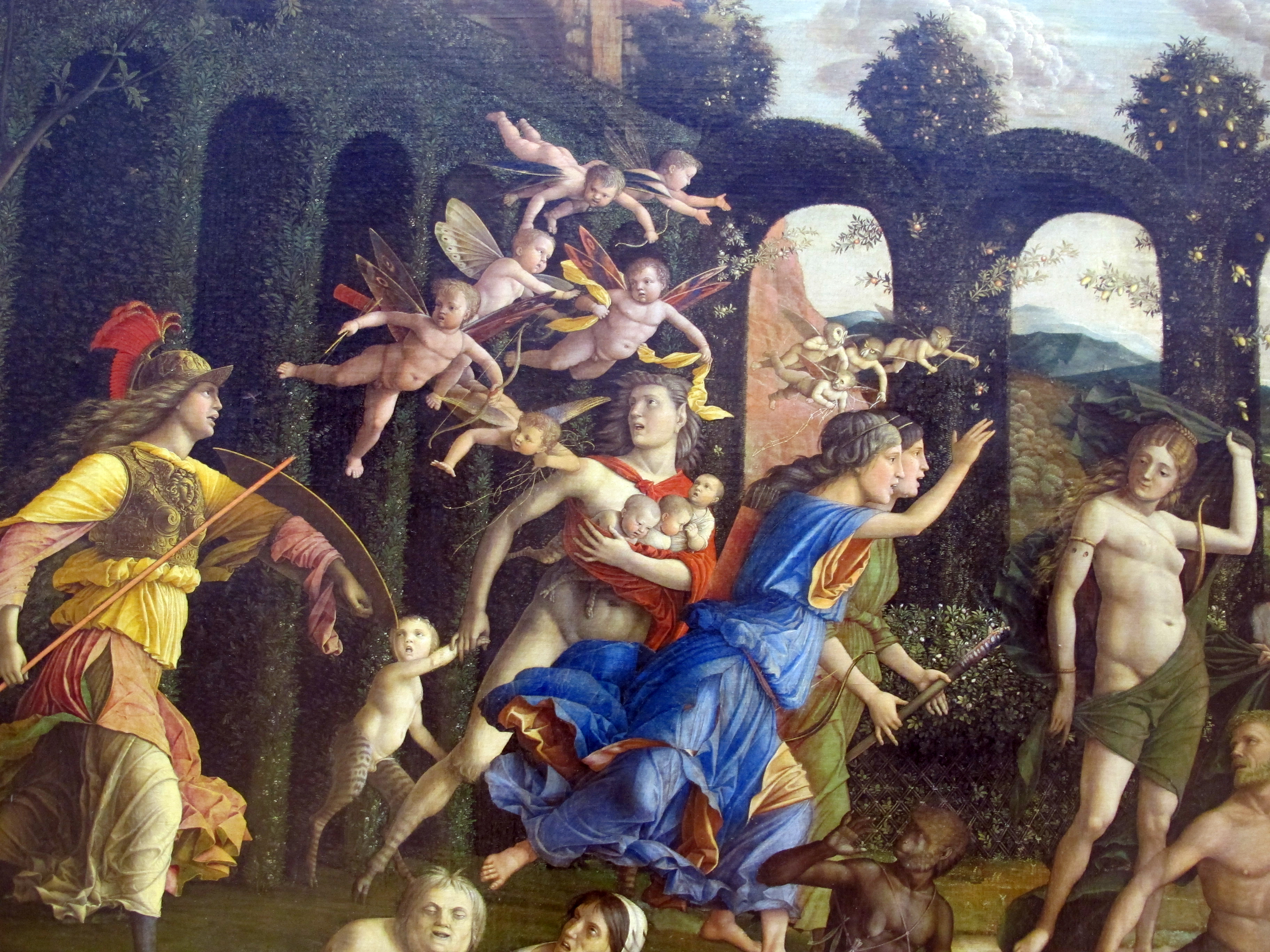
The Mardi Gras necklace bears the inscription "Pourceau Minerve enseignant" ("Minerva Teaching Pig"), which may symbolize philautia, or self-love, but also refers to impious curiosity (impia curiositas). The monster, also adorned with the trappings of luxury, serves to pinpoint the abuses of the papacy, while the andouillic race echoes the serpents of Genesis. (Note: It echoes a motto commented on by Erasmus in the Adages (I, 1, 40-41), "Sus Minervam et sus cum Minerva certamen suscepi." It evokes a pig that wishes to reclaim Minerva, the goddess of wisdom.)

The monster represents an extraordinary phenomenon for the scholarly elite of the Renaissance, a phenomenon admirable and frightening. It is presented as an enigma to be interpreted. A more deeply rooted tradition in popular culture does not ascribe a cosmic meaning to monstrosity but rather assimilates it to forms of carnival expressions associated with fear or the grotesque. Rabelais's work presents multiple conceptions of the monstrous, often used as a foil for humanist thought for polemical purposes.

The unconventional nature of these circumstances presents a hermeneutic challenge, as singularities do not inherently and consistently indicate the presence of a concealed meaning. Four sequences explicitly refer to the monster in the novel. These are the storm, associated with wonders on the island of the Macræons; Quaresmeprenant, the sperm whale; and the Andouilles. The storm, initially regarded as a natural cataclysm, is subsequently interpreted as a prescient indication of the protagonists' demise and is reincorporated into a coherent account of the world's phenomena. In contrast, the attack by the sperm whale, which recalls the stormy episode, appears to signify nothing other than itself. The vanquished creature retreats in a mundane and reminiscent way of a dead fish. Similarly, while the opposition between the Andouilles and Quaresmeprenant initially evokes the opposition between Lent and Carnival, as well as the evangelical satire against the institutional violence of the Church, fanciful elements undermine the idea of a transparent symbolization and demonstrate the ambivalence of signs. The bodies of the Andouilles, which are phallic, hybrid, and animal, are no less monstrous than those of their enemy. Their strangeness resists totalizing explanations, even if it evokes the concomitance of sexual and culinary pleasures. Therefore, Pantagruel's reference to Cratylus' theory concerning the name of the Andouilles should not be taken too seriously, as it contributes to the burlesque tone of the battle.

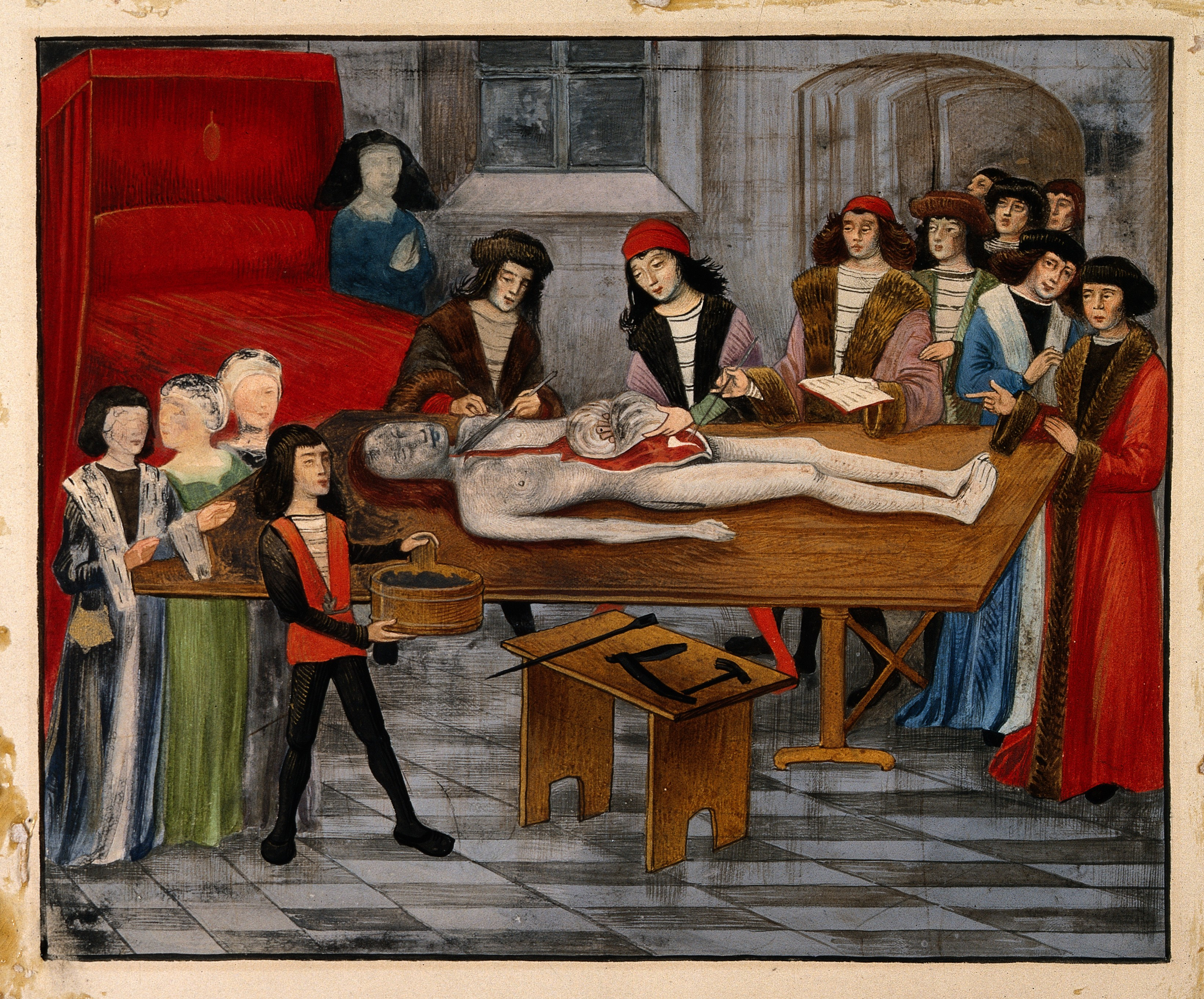
In his Grande chirurgie, Guy de Chauliac states that the stomach resembles a curved gourd and the liver the Moon. Rabelais amplifies and caricatures this type of comparison.

Quaresmeprenant represents an anomalous figure, a composite of disparate elements that resist any straightforward categorization as either human or non-human. To describe him, Rabelais employs an analogy, parodying anatomical treatises and the mirabilia of travel narratives. As Anatole-Félix Le Double observed, there are correspondences between the character's parts and the objects used for comparison. For instance, the shoulder blades are analogous to a mortar because the head of the humerus fits into it like a pestle in a mortar. This analogical system, which can be found in Galen's work, is then called into question by Vesalius' plates. Additionally, Rabelais incorporates accounts from travelers who juxtapose the unfamiliar with the familiar through striking comparisons and descriptions. Nevertheless, the implausibility of the portrait is challenged by Pantagruel, who questions how the internal parts could have been analyzed without dissection. The monstrosity of Quaresmeprenant is not depicted entirely negatively. Rather, it borrows elements from the myth of the Land of Cockaigne (sometimes inverted), showcases in its way the richness of nature, and shares common points with the kings of Lent (such as the association of its immobility with its productivity). The character conveys a satirical message while simultaneously embodying some contrasting traits. It laughs while biting, exhibits a combination of laziness and activity, and shares a fondness for table pleasures with Pantagruel.

In addition to their function within the narrative, the portrayal of monsters establishes an atmosphere of unreality and fantasy. Rabelais deploys enargeia, (Note: The ancient notion of enargeia takes on significant importance in modern rhetoric, as shown by its use in Rhetorica ad Herennium (IV, 54). More expansive than ekphrasis, it refers to the visual quality of the narrative.) a rhetorical device that aims to render a description tangible through the force of evidence, despite the creatures in question are not always representable. The sperm whale and the flying pig, respectively described by Olaus Magnus and Aelianus, are thus imaginable beings that are consistent with the logic of the narrative. The morphology of Quaresmeprenant is delineated solely by Xenomanes, and there is no assurance that he did not embellish in the presence of his companions. In contrast, Bringuenarilles, borrowed from Le Disciple de Pantagruel, is characterized by the implausibility of his demise and assumes an ornamental role due to his tenuous presence in the novel.

==== An obscene and polemical physiology ====
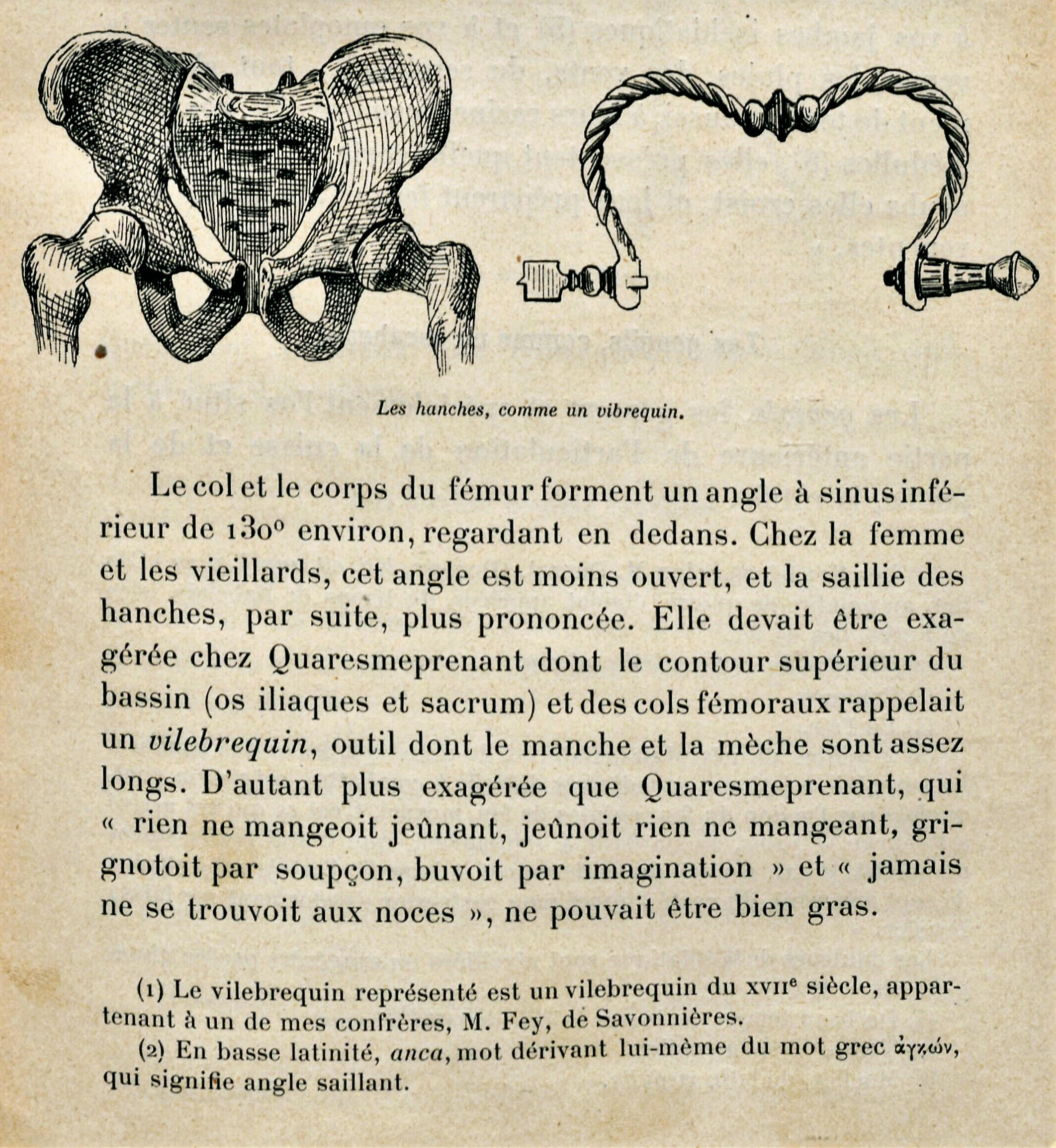
In 1899, anatomist Anatole-Félix Le Double noted the comic use of body descriptions. Some images of Quaresmeprenant are inspired by his years as a monk, such as the heart resembling a chasuble, the mesentery resembling an abbey mitre, or the kneecaps made protruding by genuflecting.

The text is imbued with a polemical charge, which is evidenced by the anatomical description provided by Quaresmeprenant, the rewriting of the androgynous myth in the guise of Antiphysie, and the ambiguities related to Priapus (the pun between mens [mind] and mentula [penis]). The andouilles represent this seemingly trivial aspect of Rabelaisian comedy: these sausages are literally erect phalluses, and Niphleseth refers to the male member in Hebrew. In his analysis, Alban Krailsheimer posits that the selection of "Andouilles" is influenced by the German language. He suggests that the term "Schmalkaldauen", which translates to "narrow intestines", resembles to Schmalkalden, evoking the historical League of Smalkald. This association, he proposes, aligns with the camp of Protestants. The founder of the Andouilles is a pig, and Martin Luther is referred to as a wild boar in the opening of the bull Exsurge Domine. The Lutheran intransigence, in comparison to the indiscriminate assaults of the Andouilles, is thus paralleled by that of the Papist camp. The 27 barrels of mustard, a scatological symbol sent as a celestial balm by Mardi Gras, complete this symbolic degradation of the lower bodily realm.

Nevertheless, excrement does not merely have a denigrating value in evangelical discourse. The puerile connotations, curative properties, and even the filthy aspect of excrement are not incompatible with spiritual elevation and hearty laughter. The use of excrement as a source of comic exaggeration is already present in Rabelais's oeuvre, as evidenced by the reference to the torchclec in Gargantua. In Dindenault's work, the benefits of sheep droppings are highlighted, with the assertion that "in all the fields where they urinate, the grain grows as if God had urinated there." The scatological enumeration represents a childlike and innocently transgressive pleasure, aligning with the humanist ideal of presenting the human body in its entirety. The stercoraire (excremental reference) retains its denigrating and moralizing dimension when Gaster reminds the matagots (a type of peasant) that he is not God but merely a humble creature, inviting them to seek a trace of divinity in his droppings, thereby denouncing the scandal of the Incarnation. The malodorous conclusion of Le Quart Livre can be interpreted in a similarly to that of the Heptaméron of Marguerite de Navarre. This interpretation suggests that the literary enterprise, and more broadly, language itself, are disqualified in their pretense to describe the world.

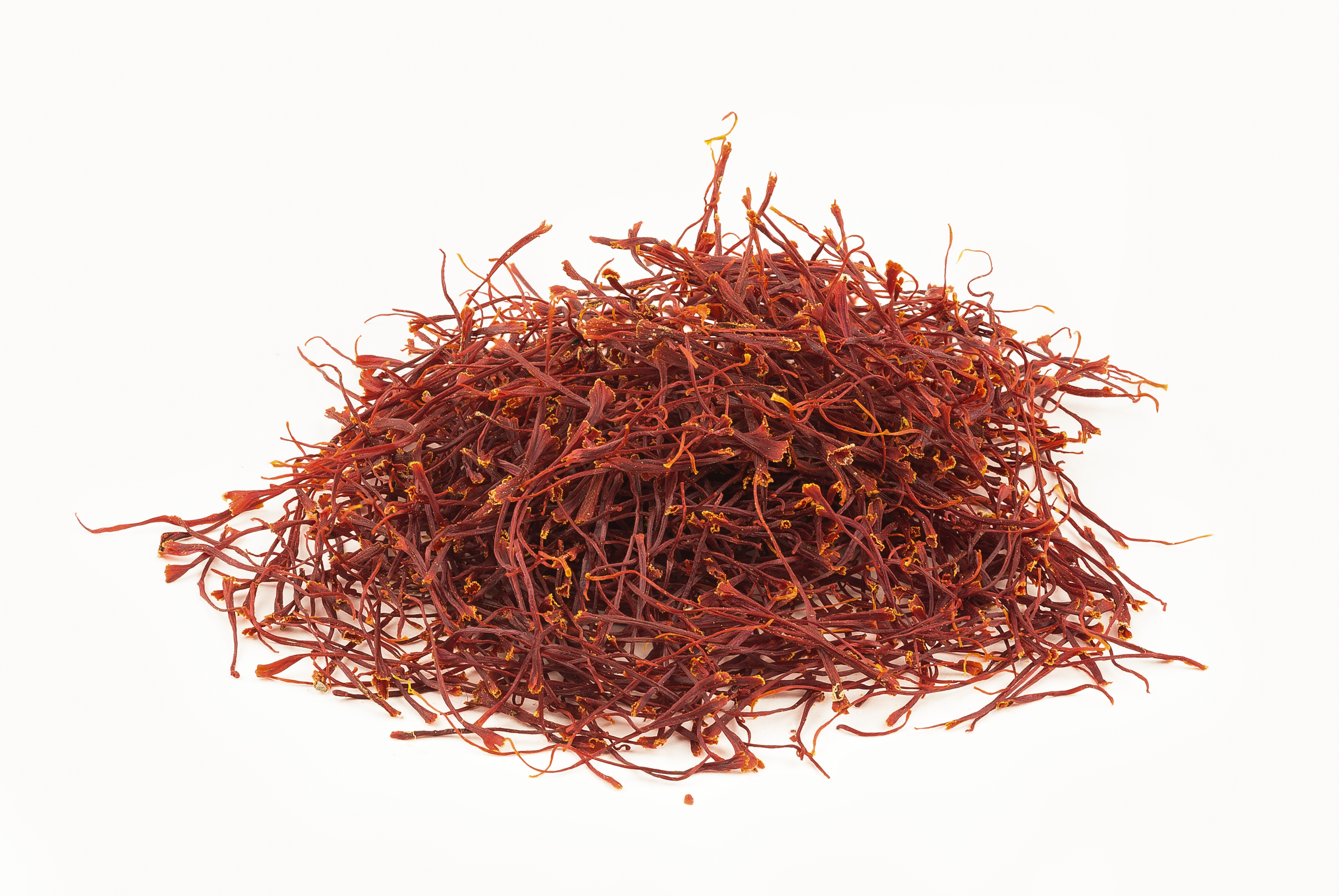
The transmutation of base matter into gold has alchemical connotations. Saffron is described as vegetable gold by alchemists, for example in Augurelli's Chrysopœia, translated by Pierre de Tours in 1548 as Facture de l'or.

In his concluding outburst, Panurge attempts to atone for his previous actions through a lexical pirouette, incorporating a pun in the process. The word bren, found in "Hibernie" by metastasis, serves as the basis for this pun. Nevertheless, this wordplay reveals Panurge's ambivalence. Saffron, when employed as a pharmaceutical agent rather than a condiment, is renowned for its myriad therapeutic properties, particularly for mitigating the effects of wine. However, it is also depicted as a lethal threat in high doses. In Canon, Avicenna enumerates the benefits of the substance, asserting that it brings a sweet and joyful death. This assertion is corroborated by Laurent Joubert in Traité du ris. Although Panurge appears to perform a value inversion by transmuting his excrement into gold, he is ultimately revealed to be a braggart magician who remains true to himself. However, before his tirade, Panurge is sent to wash and dress in white, which, along with the text's final words ("Sela. Beuvons"), invites the reader to consider that neither eschatological nor scatological readings are mutually exclusive.

Raphaële Garrod posits that the mention of Irish saffron is a veiled satire concerning the unsuccessful French landing in Ireland. By associating the color of his garment with the plant, Panurge refers to the saffron shirt worn by the Irish, or léine, which was documented by Renaissance cartographers and historians. This traditional garment serves as a marker of national identity and a signifier of rusticity. Since 1540, Gerald FitzGerald, who was unofficially king of Ireland, has been the subject of a power struggle between the regency of Edward VI and Henry II, who both sought to gain his allegiance. The peace between France and England on the one hand and the disunity of Gaelic lords on the other undermines this vassalization project. In June 1549, Gerald FitzGerald sided with the English cause. The portrait of Panurge, who moves his lips like a monkey with a cat clinging to his breeches, lends support to this analysis, as the feline recalls English arms, while the monkey has been associated with Kildare since the 13th century.

== Insights on intertextuality ==
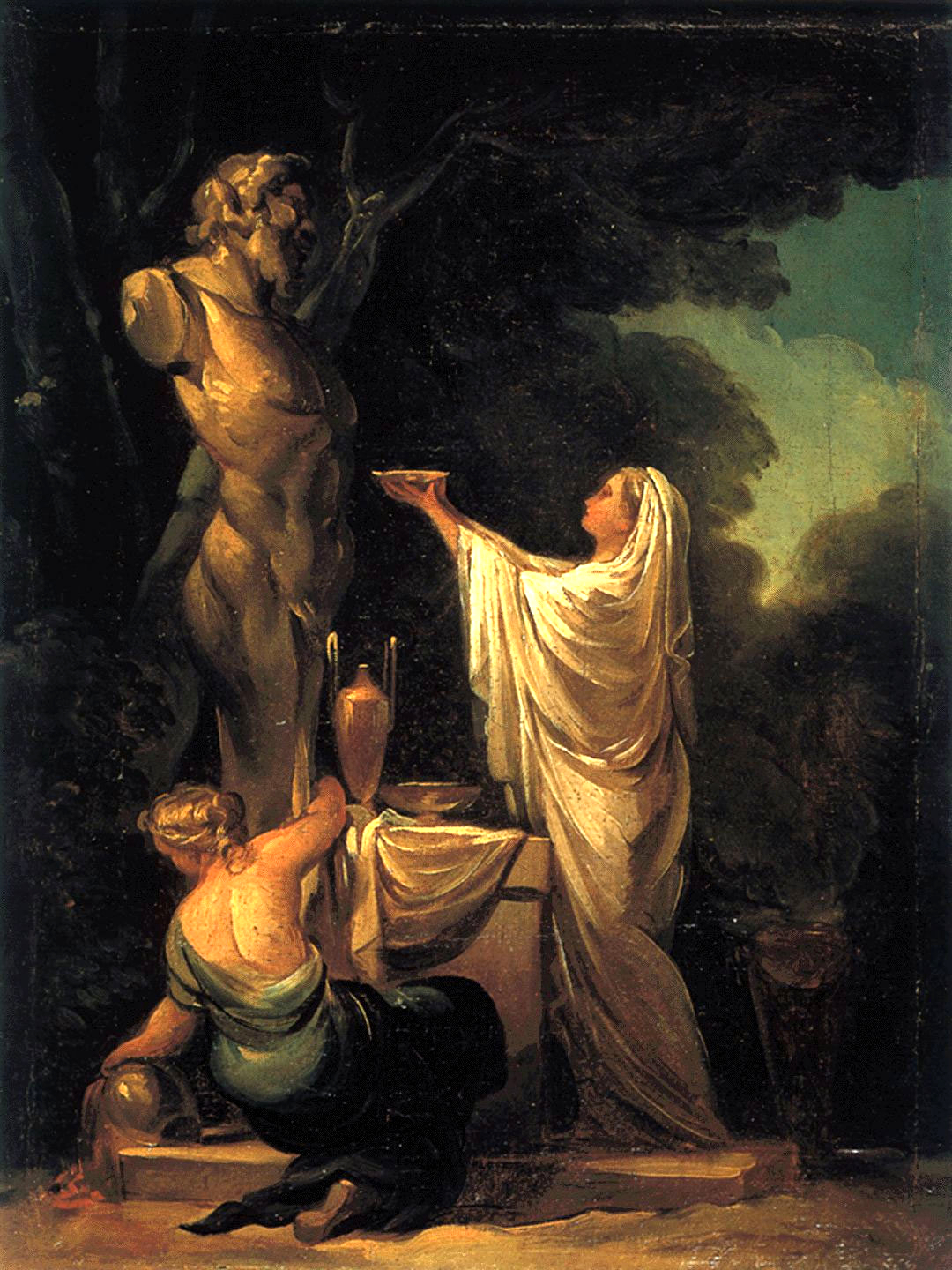
A Christian retelling of a Greek myth described by Plutarch, the evocation of Pan's death on the island of the Macraeons is associated with Christ's death and victory over evil in Renaissance literature. This syncretic motif can be found in Guillaume Postel's De Etruriae regionis and Guillaume Bigot's Christianae Philosophae Praludium.

A True History by Lucian, The Macaronics by Teofilo Folengo, and The Disciple of Pantagruel, ascribed to Jehan d'Abundance, represent three significant sources of inspiration for Rabelaisian themes in Le Quart Livre.

The giant Bringuenarilles and the Andouilles appear in Rabelais's The Disciple of Pantagruel. However, in Rabelais's work, the journey possesses a perspective that amplifies the significance of its source of inspiration. In the latter, events are juxtaposed without the protagonists complicating their interpretation through their narratives. The few motifs the writer reuses are reworked and imbued with new meaning.

The marginal annotations made in one of the four copies of Plutarch's Moralia that belonged to Rabelais provide insight into the genesis of Le Quart Livre. (Note: This refers to a Greek edition from 1542, preserved at the BNF under the reference GR Rés. g. R. 33, correcting the Aldine edition of 1509.) The marginalia of this compilation of essays indicate passages that captured the writer's attention. The treatise On the De la disparition des oracles provides the impetus for Pantagruel's contemplations on the aggregate of ages in chapter XXVII and the account of Pan's demise in the subsequent chapter. Another example is the connection between ideas and atoms referenced on the island of Medamothi, which evokes Epicurean physics as exposed in Against Colotes. More broadly, this source testifies to the writer's Hellenism, as he comments on Greek works that had not yet been translated into Latin.

The novel explicitly cites the Hippocratic Corpus on nine occasions, indicating a more pronounced influence than in Rabelais's previous narrative works. Moreover, it is noteworthy that the majority of these references originate from the treatise on Épidémies. Rabelais draws inspiration from the commentaries of Galen, Jean d'Alexandrie, and Leonhart Fuchs concerning this text, demonstrating that he consulted multiple editions. For example, he references the physician's complacency towards the patient, the lethal ingestion of a serpent, and the mention of the Engastrimythes (ventriloquists). This collection of observations rekindled interest in clinical observation during the Renaissance and aligns with the humanists' trend of correcting medieval knowledge using Greek philology. It summarizes and applies the teachings of Hippocrates found in other treatises, thereby elucidating their significance for a physician like Rabelais.

Le Quart Livre represents a synthesis of various dramatic genres prevalent during the period in which it was composed. The diableries of the mysteries are employed in a comedic manner in the opposition between Panurge and Frère Jean, or satirically to denounce the diabolical nature of the Papimanes. This reference is explicitly highlighted in the passage centered on the mystery of the Passion at Saint-Maxent, which was organized by François Villon. The description of the diablerie emphasizes particularly on the pyrotechnic displays, the noise of the performance, and the interjections, including the word "brou", which is typical of the devils in the mysteries. The bargaining between Dindenault and Panurge directly alludes to the negotiations depicted in La Farce de Maître Pathelin. The play adopts the form and function of the aforementioned dramatic genre, yet reverses the elements. While Pathelin's cleverness deceives Guillaume, Panurge's laconic discourse ultimately triumphs over Dindenault's boastfulness. Panurge effectively takes control of the discourse, allowing the loquacious speaker to become mired in a futile monologue.

The day of Pantagruel's embarkation corresponds to the day of the Vestalia, which is also mentioned in the preface to In Praise of Folly. As in his other novels, Rabelais subtly incorporates several allusions to Erasmus, aligning with his satirical critique of ecclesiastical institutions, particularly their materialism and denial of authentic spirituality. In Le Quart Livre, as in the aforementioned Erasmian work, the character of Priapus combines a ribald repertoire with Christ-like aspects.

== See also ==
- Gargantua and Pantagruel

== Bibliography ==
=== Older editions ===
- Le Quart livre des faictz et dictz héroïques du noble Pantagruel. Composé par M. François Rabelais, docteur en médecine et calloier des isles Hieres (in French). Lyon. 1548. Archived from the original on September 5, 2023.
- Le Quart livre des faicts et dicts heroiques du bon Pantagruel. Composé par M. François Rabelais docteur en medicine (in French). Paris: Michel Fezandat. 1552. Archived from the original on April 28, 2024.

=== Modern editions ===
- Rabelais, François (1994). Œuvres complètes [Complete works]. Bibliothèque de la Pléiade (in French). Paris: Gallimard. ISBN 978-2-07-011340-8.
- Rabelais, François (1998). Quart Livre [Fourth Book]. Folio classique (in French). Vol. 3037. Paris: Points. ISBN 2-07-038959-6.
- Rabelais, François (1947). Quart Livre [Fourth Book]. Textes littéraires français (in French). Vol. 10. Paris: Droz.

=== Studies ===
==== Books ====
- Demonet, Marie-Luce; Geonget, Stéphan (2012). Études rabelaisiennes [Rabelaisian studies]. Travaux d'Humanisme et Renaissance (in French). Vol. 52: Un joyeux quart de sentences. Geneva: Droz. ISBN 978-2-600-01607-0. JSTOR 24329137. Archived from the original on September 4, 2023.
- Defaux, Gérard (1997). Études rabelaisiennes, vol. 32 : Rabelais agonistes, du rieur au prophète : études. Travaux d'Humanisme et Renaissance (in French). Vol. 309. Geneva: Droz. ISBN 2-600-00202-2.
- Giacone, Franco (2012). Langue et sens du Quart Livre : actes du colloque organisé à Rome en novembre 2011 [Language and meaning in the Fourth World: proceedings of the conference held in Rome in November 2011]. Les mondes de Rabelais (in French). Paris: Classiques Garnier. ISBN 978-2-8124-0366-8. Archived from the original on October 23, 2020.
- Le Cadet, Nicolas (2021). Rabelais et le théâtre [Rabelais and the theater]. Les mondes de Rabelais (in French). Paris: Classiques Garnier. ISBN 978-2-406-10450-6.
- Marrache-Gouraud, Myriam (2011). Rabelais, aux confins des mondes possibles : Quart Livre [Rabelais, on the edge of possible worlds: Quart Livre]. Collection CNED-PUF / XVIe siècle français (in French). Paris: PUF, CNED. ISBN 978-2-13-059192-4.
- Saulnier, V.-L (1982). Rabelais, t. 2 : Rabelais dans son enquête. Étude sur le Quart Livre et le Cinquième Livre [Rabelais, t. 2: Rabelais dans son enquête. A study of the Quart Livre and the Cinquième Livre] (in French). Paris: Sedes. JSTOR 40527471. Archived from the original on September 4, 2023.
- Screech, Michael (1992). Rabelais. Tel (in French). Paris: Gallimard. ISBN 978-2-07-012348-3.
- Smith, Paul J (1987). "Études rabelaisiennes" [Rabelaisian studies]. Réforme, Humanisme, Renaissance. Travaux d'humanisme et de la Renaissance (in French). 19 : Voyage et écriture : étude sur le Quart livre de Rabelais (1). Geneva: Droz: 59–60. Archived from the original on March 7, 2024.
- Berry, Alice Fiola (2000). The Charm of Catastrophe : A Study of Rabelais's Quart Livre. North Carolina Studies in the Romance Languages and Literatures. Chapel Hill: University of North Calorina Press. ISBN 978-0-8078-9271-8. JSTOR 10.5149/9781469641591_berry. Archived from the original on October 2, 2020.

==== Papers ====
- Jeanneret, Michel (1975). "Les paroles dégelées (Rabelais, Quart Livre, 48-65)" [Thawed words (Rabelais, Quart Livre, 48-65)]. Littérature (in French). 17 (17): 14–20. doi:10.3406/litt.1975.979. eISSN 1958-5926. Archived from the original on March 18, 2024.
- Defaux, Gérard (1996). "« Hoc est porcus meus » : Rabelais et les monstres du Quart Livre" ["Hoc est porcus meus": Rabelais and the monsters of the Quart Livre]. Travaux de littérature (in French) (9): 37–50. eISSN 0995-6794.
- Deloince-Louette, Christiane (2005). "Mourir de rire, mourir pour rire dans le Quart Livre" [Dying of laughter, dying for laughter in the Fourth Book]. Recherches & Travaux (in French) (67): 103–112. doi:10.4000/recherchestravaux.267. eISSN 1969-6434. Archived from the original on July 5, 2022.
