= University of Paris =

Historic university in France (1150–1970)

- French: Université de Paris
- Coat of arms of the university
- Latin: Universitas magistrorum et scholarium Parisiensis
- Motto: Hic et ubique terrarum (Latin)
- Motto in English: Here and anywhere on Earth
- Type: Corporative, then public university
- Active: 1150 (Note: Origins at the Parisian cathedral school during the High Middle Ages.)–1970 (Note: Suppressed from 1793–1806, while the faculties and university were respectively reestablished in 1806 and 1896.)
- Location: Paris, France
- Campus: Urban

The University of Paris (French: Université de Paris, pronounced [ynivɛʁsite də paʁi]) was the leading university in Paris, France, from 1150 to 1970, except for 1793–1806 during the French Revolution. Emerging around 1150 as a corporation associated with the cathedral school of Paris, it was considered the second-oldest university in Europe. Officially chartered in 1200 by King Philip II and recognised in 1215 by Pope Innocent III, it was nicknamed after its theological College of Sorbonne, founded by Robert de Sorbon and chartered by King Louis IX around 1257.

Highly reputed internationally for its academic performance in the humanities ever since the Middle Ages – particularly in theology and philosophy – it introduced academic standards and traditions that have endured and spread, such as doctoral degrees and student nations. Notable popes, royalty, scientists, and intellectuals were educated at the University of Paris. A few of the colleges of the time are still visible close to the Panthéon and Jardin du Luxembourg: Collège des Bernardins (18 rue de Poissy, 5th arr.), Hôtel de Cluny (6 Place Paul Painlevé, 5th arr.), Collège Sainte-Barbe (4 rue Valette, 5th arr.), Collège d'Harcourt (44 Boulevard Saint-Michel, 6th arr.), and Cordeliers (21 rue École de Médecine, 6th arr.).

In 1793, during the French Revolution, the university was closed and, by Item 27 of the Revolutionary Convention, the college endowments and buildings were sold. A new University of France replaced it in 1806 with four independent faculties: the Faculty of Humanities (French: Faculté des Lettres), the Faculty of Law (later including Economics), the Faculty of Science, the Faculty of Medicine and the Faculty of Theology (closed in 1885).

In 1896, a new University of Paris was re-founded as a grouping of the Paris faculties of science, literature, law, medicine, Protestant theology and the École supérieure de pharmacie de Paris. It was inaugurated on November 19, 1896, by French president Félix Faure. In 1970, after the civil unrest of May 1968, the university was divided into 13 autonomous universities, which today are Sorbonne University, Panthéon-Sorbonne University, Assas University, Sorbonne Nouvelle University, Paris Cité University, PSL University, Saclay University, Nanterre University, Sorbonne Paris North University, Paris-East Créteil University and Paris 8 University. The Chancellery of the Universities of Paris inherited the heritage assets of the University of Paris, including the Sorbonne building, the "La Sorbonne" brand, control of the inter-university libraries, and management of the staff of the Paris universities (until 2007).

== History ==
=== Origins ===
In 1150, the future University of Paris was a student–teacher corporation operating as an annex of the cathedral school of Paris. The earliest historical reference to it is found in Matthew Paris's reference to the studies of his own teacher (an abbot of St Albans) and his acceptance into "the fellowship of the elect Masters" there in about 1170, and it is known that Lotario dei Conti di Segni, the future Pope Innocent III, completed his studies there in 1182 at the age of 21. Its first college was the Collège des Dix-Huit, established in 1180 by an Englishman named Josse and endowed for 18 poor scholars.

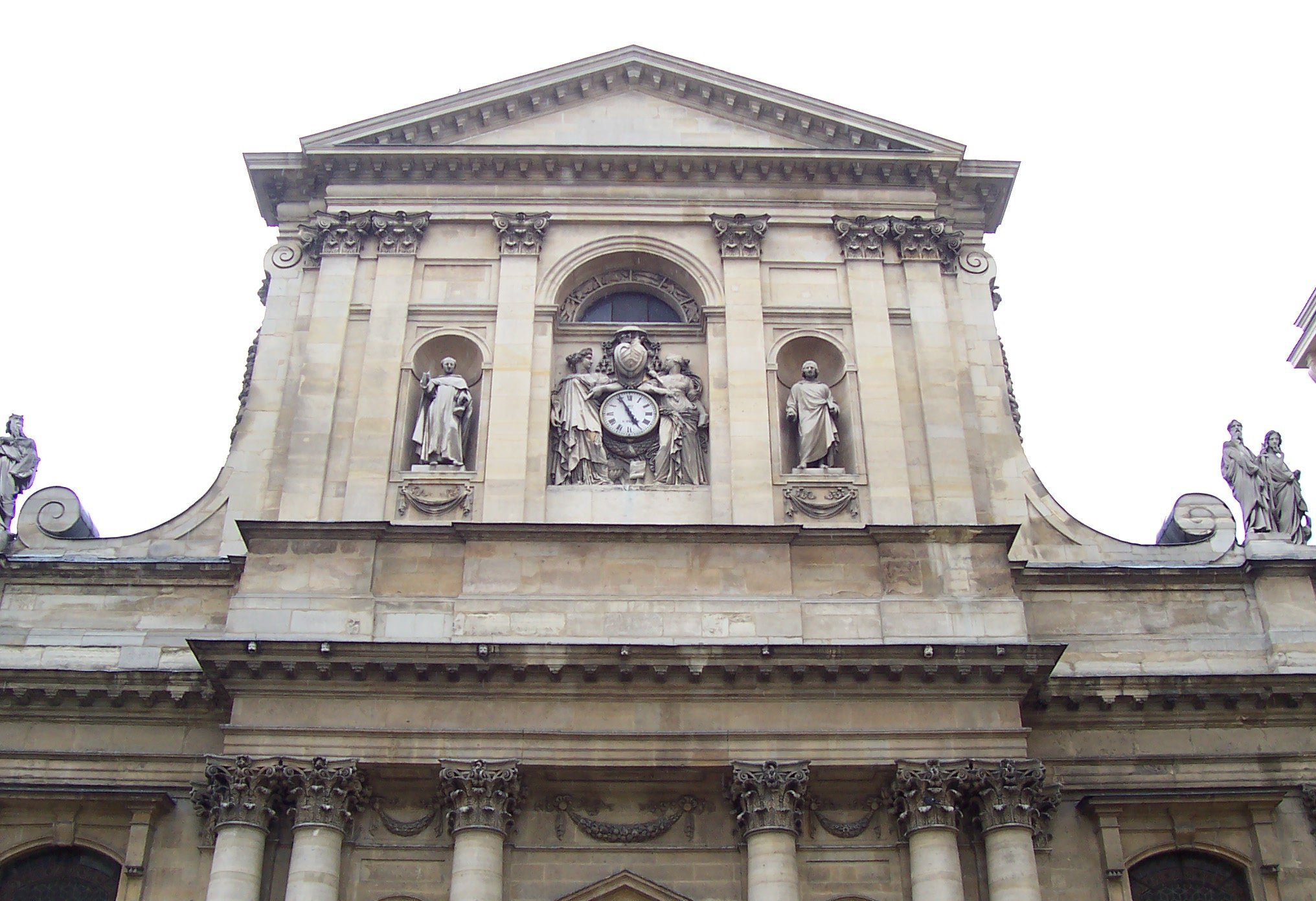
La Sorbonne

The corporation was formally recognised as an "Universitas" in an edict by King Philippe-Auguste in 1200: in it, among other accommodations granted to future students, he allowed the corporation to operate under ecclesiastic law which would be governed by the elders of the Notre-Dame Cathedral school, and assured all those completing courses there that they would be granted a diploma.

The university had four faculties: Arts, Medicine, Law, and Theology. The Faculty of Arts was the lowest in rank, but also the largest, as students had to graduate there in order to be admitted to one of the higher faculties. The students were divided into four nationes according to language or regional origin: France, Normandy, Picardy, and England. The last came to be known as the Alemannian (German) nation. Recruitment to each nation was wider than the names might imply: the English–German nation included students from Scandinavia and Eastern Europe.

The faculty and nation system of the University of Paris (along with that of the University of Bologna) became the model for all later medieval universities. Under the governance of the Church, students wore robes and shaved the tops of their heads in tonsure, to signify they were under the protection of the church. Students followed the rules and laws of the Church and were not subject to the king's laws or courts. This presented problems for the city of Paris, as students ran wild, and its official had to appeal to Church courts for justice. Students were often very young, entering the school at 13 or 14 years of age and staying for six to 12 years.

School	Founded
College of the Eighteen	1180
College of Sorbonne	1257
College of Navarre	1305
Law	1150
Medicine	1200
Arts	1213
Divinity	1221
Education	1794
Sciences	1808
Pharmacy	1864
Government	1872
Business	1956

=== 12th century: Organisation ===
Three schools were especially famous in Paris: the palatine or palace school, the school of Notre-Dame, and that of Sainte-Geneviève Abbey. The latter two, although ancient, were initially eclipsed by the palatine school, until the decline of royalty brought about its decline.

The first renowned professor at the school of Ste-Geneviève was Hubold, who lived in the tenth century. Not content with the courses at Liège, he continued his studies at Paris, entered or allied himself with the chapter of Ste-Geneviève, and attracted many pupils via his teaching. Distinguished professors from the school of Notre-Dame in the eleventh century include Lambert, disciple of Fulbert of Chartres; Drogo of Paris; Manegold of Germany; and Anselm of Laon. These two schools attracted scholars from every country and produced many illustrious men, among whom were: St. Stanislaus of Szczepanów, Bishop of Kraków; Gebbard, Archbishop of Salzburg; St. Stephen, third Abbot of Cîteaux; Robert d'Arbrissel, founder of the Abbey of Fontevrault etc. Three other men who added prestige to the schools of Notre-Dame and Ste-Geneviève were William of Champeaux, Abélard, and Peter Lombard.

Humanistic instruction comprised grammar, rhetoric, dialectics, arithmetic, geometry, music, and astronomy (trivium and quadrivium). To the higher instruction belonged dogmatic and moral theology, whose source was the Scriptures and the Patristic Fathers. It was completed by the study of Canon law. The School of Saint-Victor arose to rival those of Notre-Dame and Ste-Geneviève. It was founded by William of Champeaux when he withdrew to the Abbey of Saint-Victor. Its most famous professors are Hugh of St. Victor and Richard of St. Victor.

The plan of studies expanded in the schools of Paris, as it did elsewhere. A Bolognese compendium of canon law called the Decretum Gratiani brought about a division of the theology department. Hitherto the discipline of the Church had not been separate from so-called theology; they were studied together under the same professor. But this vast collection necessitated a special course, which was undertaken first at Bologna, where Roman law was taught. In France, first Orléans and then Paris erected chairs of canon law. Before the end of the twelfth century, the Decretals of Gerard La Pucelle, Mathieu d'Angers, and Anselm (or Anselle) of Paris, were added to the Decretum Gratiani. However, civil law was not included at Paris. In the twelfth century, medicine began to be publicly taught at Paris: the first professor of medicine in Paris records is Hugo, physicus excellens qui quadrivium docuit.

Professors were required to have measurable knowledge and be appointed by the university. Applicants had to be assessed by examination; if successful, the examiner, who was the head of the school, and known as scholasticus, capiscol, and chancellor, appointed an individual to teach. This was called the licence or faculty to teach. The licence had to be granted freely. No one could teach without it; on the other hand, the examiner could not refuse to award it when the applicant deserved it.

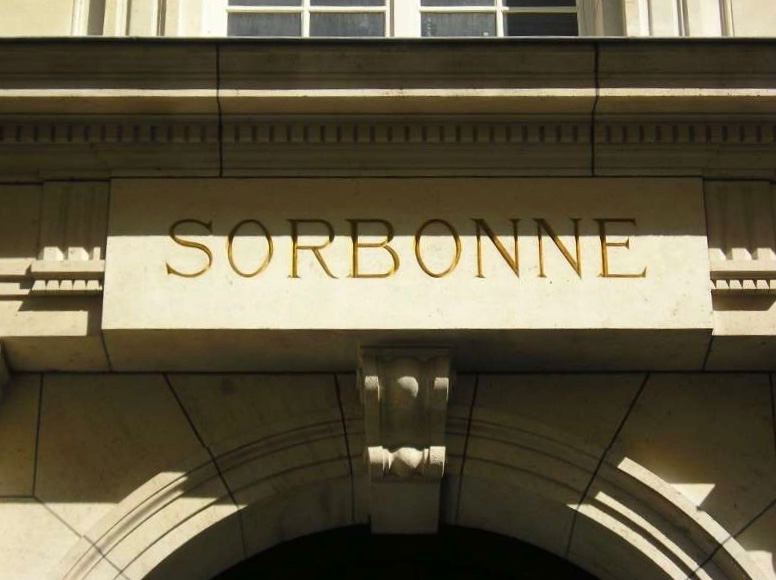

The school of Saint-Victor, under the abbey, conferred the licence in its own right; the school of Notre-Dame depended on the diocese, that of Ste-Geneviève on the abbey or chapter. The diocese and the abbey or chapter, through their chancellor, gave professorial investiture in their respective territories where they had jurisdiction. Besides Notre-Dame, Ste-Geneviève, and Saint-Victor, there were several schools on the "Island" and on the "Mount". "Whoever", says Crevier "had the right to teach might open a school where he pleased, provided it was not in the vicinity of a principal school." Thus a certain Adam, who was of English origin, kept his "near the Petit Pont"; another Adam, Parisian by birth, "taught at the Grand Pont which is called the Pont-au-Change" (Hist. de l'Univers. de Paris, I, 272).

The number of students in the school of the capital grew constantly, so that lodgings were insufficient. French students included princes of the blood, sons of the nobility, and ranking gentry. The courses at Paris were considered so necessary as a completion of studies that many foreigners flocked to them. Popes Celestine II, Adrian IV and Innocent III studied at Paris, and Alexander III sent his nephews there. Noted German and English students included Otto of Freisingen, Cardinal Conrad, Archbishop of Mainz, St. Thomas of Canterbury, and John of Salisbury; while Ste-Geneviève became practically the seminary for Denmark. The chroniclers of the time called Paris the city of letters par excellence, placing it above Athens, Alexandria, Rome, and other cities: "At that time, there flourished at Paris philosophy and all branches of learning, and there the seven arts were studied and held in such esteem as they never were at Athens, Egypt, Rome, or elsewhere in the world." ("Les gestes de Philippe-Auguste"). Poets extolled the university in their verses, comparing it to all that was greatest, noblest, and most valuable in the world.

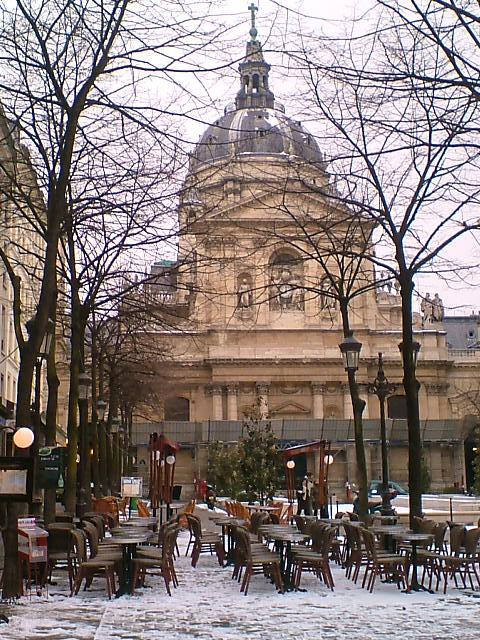
The Sorbonne covered by snow.

To allow poor students to study, the first college des dix-Huit was founded by a knight returning from Jerusalem called Josse of London for 18 scholars who received lodgings and 12 pence or denarii a month.

As the university developed, it became more institutionalized. First, the professors formed an association, for according to Matthew Paris, John of Celles, twenty-first Abbot of St Albans, England, was admitted as a member of the teaching corps of Paris after he had followed the courses (Vita Joannis I, XXI, abbat. S. Alban). The masters, as well as the students, were divided according to national origin,. Alban wrote that Henry II, King of England, in his difficulties with St. Thomas of Canterbury, wanted to submit his cause to a tribunal composed of professors of Paris, chosen from various provinces (Hist. major, Henry II, to end of 1169). This was likely the start of the division according to "nations," which was later to play an important part in the university. Celestine III ruled that both professors and students had the privilege of being subject only to the ecclesiastical courts, not to civil courts.

The three schools: Notre-Dame, Sainte-Geneviève, and Saint-Victor, may be regarded as the triple cradle of the Universitas scholarium, which included masters and students; hence the name University. Henry Denifle and some others hold that this honour is exclusive to the school of Notre-Dame (Chartularium Universitatis Parisiensis), but the reasons do not seem convincing. He excludes Saint-Victor because, at the request of the abbot and the religious of Saint-Victor, Gregory IX in 1237 authorized them to resume the interrupted teaching of theology. But the university was largely founded about 1208, as is shown by a Bull of Innocent III. Consequently, the schools of Saint-Victor might well have contributed to its formation. Secondly, Denifle excludes the schools of Ste-Geneviève because there had been no interruption in the teaching of the liberal arts. This is debatable and through the period, theology was taught. The chancellor of Ste-Geneviève continued to give degrees in arts, something he would have ceased if his abbey had no part in the university organization.

=== 13th–14th century: Expansion ===
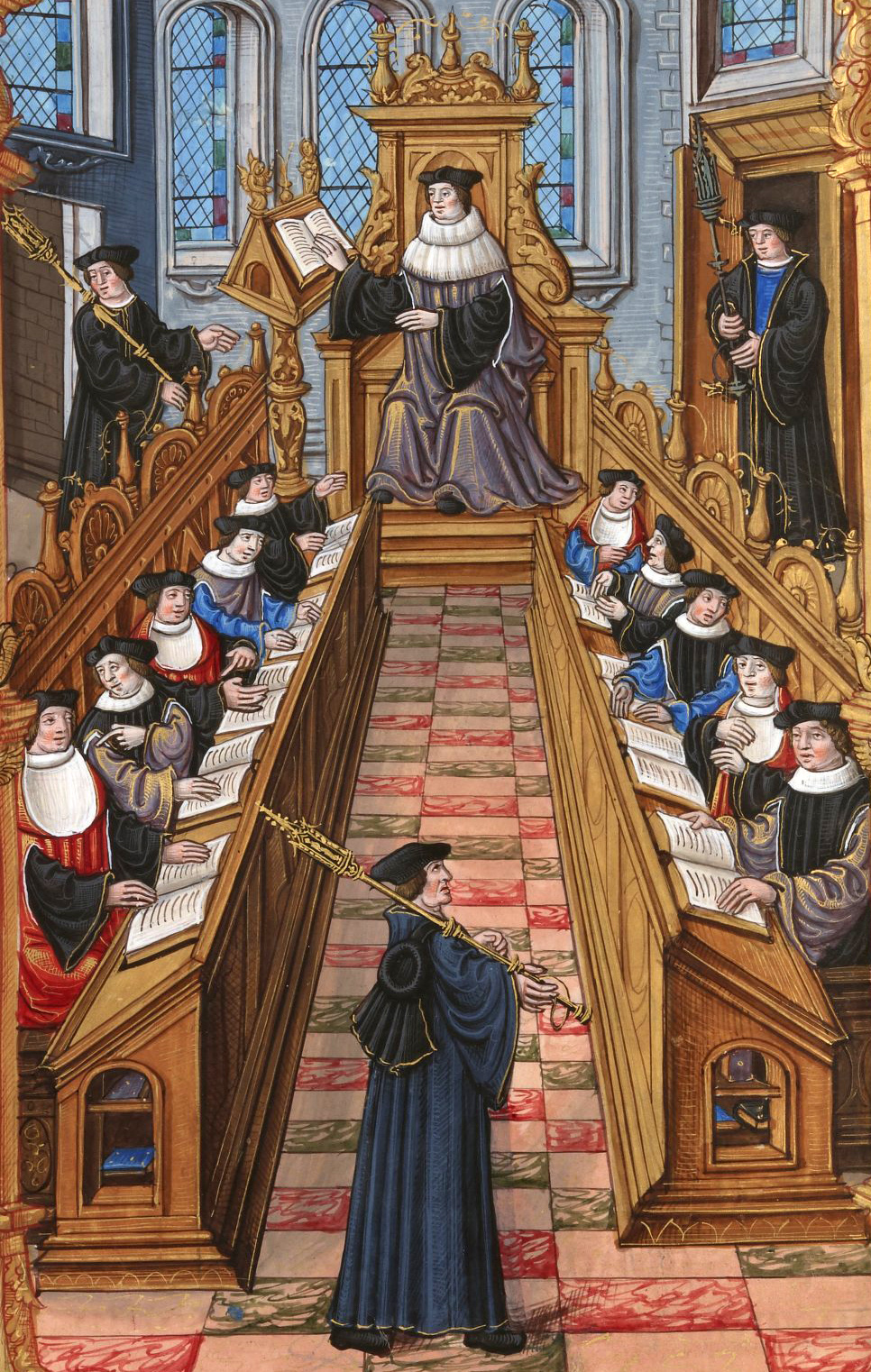
Meeting of doctors at the University of Paris. From a 16th-century miniature.

In 1200, King Philip II issued a diploma "for the security of the scholars of Paris," which affirmed that students were subject to only ecclesiastical jurisdiction. The provost and other officers were forbidden to arrest a student for any offence, unless to transfer him to ecclesiastical authority. The king's officers could not intervene with any member unless having a mandate from an ecclesiastical authority. His action followed a violent incident between students and officers outside the city walls at a pub.

In 1215, the Apostolic legate, Robert de Courçon, issued new rules governing who could become a professor. To teach the arts, a candidate had to be at least twenty-one, to have studied these arts at least six years, and to take an engagement as professor for at least two years. For a chair in theology, the candidate had to be thirty years of age, with eight years of theological studies, of which the last three years were devoted to special courses of lectures in preparation for the mastership. These studies had to be made in the local schools under the direction of a master. In Paris, one was regarded as a scholar by studies with only particular masters. Lastly, purity of morals was as important as reading. The licence was granted, according to custom, gratuitously, without oath or condition. Masters and students were permitted to unite, even by oath, in defence of their rights, when they could not otherwise obtain justice in serious matters. No mention is made either of law or of medicine, probably because these sciences were less prominent.

In 1229, a denial of justice by the queen led to suspension of the courses. The pope intervened with a bull that began with lavish praise of the university: "Paris", said Gregory IX, "mother of the sciences, is another Cariath-Sepher, city of letters". He commissioned the bishops of Le Mans and Senlis and the archdeacon of Châlons to negotiate with the French Court for the restoration of the university, but by the end of 1230 they had accomplished nothing. Gregory IX then addressed a Bull of 1231 to the masters and scholars of Paris. Not only did he settle the dispute, he empowered the university to frame statutes concerning the discipline of the schools, the method of instruction, the defence of theses, the costume of the professors, and the obsequies of masters and students (expanding upon Robert de Courçon's statutes). Most importantly, the pope granted the university the right to suspend its courses, if justice were denied it, until it should receive full satisfaction.

The pope authorized Pierre Le Mangeur to collect a moderate fee for the conferring of the license of professorship. Also, for the first time, the scholars had to pay tuition fees for their education: two sous weekly, to be deposited in the common fund.

==== Rector ====
The university was organized as follows: at the head of the teaching body was a rector. The office was elective and of short duration; at first it was limited to four or six weeks. Simon de Brion, legate of the Holy See in France, realizing that such frequent changes caused serious inconvenience, decided that the rectorate should last three months, and this rule was observed for three years. Then the term was lengthened to one, two, and sometimes three years. The right of election belonged to the procurators of the four nations. Henry of Unna was proctor of the University of Paris in the 14th century, beginning his term on January 13, 1340.

==== Four "nations" ====
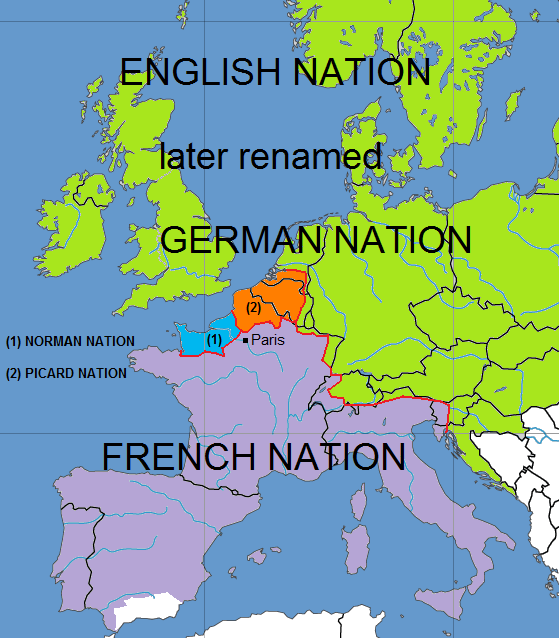
Map showing the territories covered by the four nations of the University of Paris during the Middle Ages.

The "nations" appeared in the second half of the twelfth century. They were mentioned in the Bull of Honorius III in 1222. Later, they formed a distinct body. By 1249, the four nations existed with their procurators, their rights (more or less well-defined), and their keen rivalries: the nations were the French, English, Normans, and Picards. After the Hundred Years' War, the English nation was replaced by the Germanic. The four nations constituted the faculty of arts or letters.

The territories covered by the four nations were:

- French nation: all the Romance-speaking parts of Europe except those included within the Norman and Picard nations
- English nation (renamed 'German nation' after the Hundred Years' War): the British Isles, the Germanic-speaking parts of continental Europe (except those included within the Picard nation), and the Slavic-speaking parts of Europe. The majority of students within that nation came from Germany and Scotland, and when it was renamed 'German nation' it was also sometimes called natio Germanorum et Scotorum ("nation of the Germans and Scots").
- Norman nation: the ecclesiastical province of Rouen, which corresponded approximately to the Duchy of Normandy. This was a Romance-speaking territory, but it was not included within the French nation.
- Picard nation: the Romance-speaking bishoprics of Beauvais, Noyon, Amiens, Laon, and Arras; the bilingual (Romance and Germanic-speaking) bishoprics of Thérouanne, Cambrai, and Tournai; a large part of the bilingual bishopric of Liège; and the southernmost part of the Germanic-speaking bishopric of Utrecht (the part of that bishopric located south of the river Meuse; the rest of the bishopric north of the Meuse belonged to the English nation). It was estimated that about half of the students in the Picard nation were Romance-speakers (Picard and Walloon), and the other half were Germanic-speakers (West Flemish, East Flemish, Brabantian and Limburgish dialects).

==== Faculties ====
To classify professors' knowledge, the schools of Paris gradually divided into faculties. Professors of the same science were brought into closer contact until the community of rights and interests cemented the union and made them distinct groups. The faculty of medicine seems to have been the last to form. But the four faculties were already formally established by 1254, when the university described in a letter "theology, jurisprudence, medicine, and rational, natural, and moral philosophy". The masters of theology often set the example for the other faculties—e.g., they were the first to adopt an official seal.

The faculties of theology, canon law, and medicine, were called "superior faculties". The title of "Dean" as designating the head of a faculty, came into use by 1268 in the faculties of law and medicine, and by 1296 in the faculty of theology. It seems that at first the deans were the oldest masters. The faculty of arts continued to have four procurators of its four nations and its head was the rector. As the faculties became more fully organized, the division into four nations partially disappeared for theology, law and medicine, though it continued in arts. Eventually the superior faculties included only doctors, leaving the bachelors to the faculty of arts. At this period, therefore, the university had two principal degrees, the baccalaureate and the doctorate. It was not until much later that the licentiate and the DEA became intermediate degrees.

==== Colleges ====
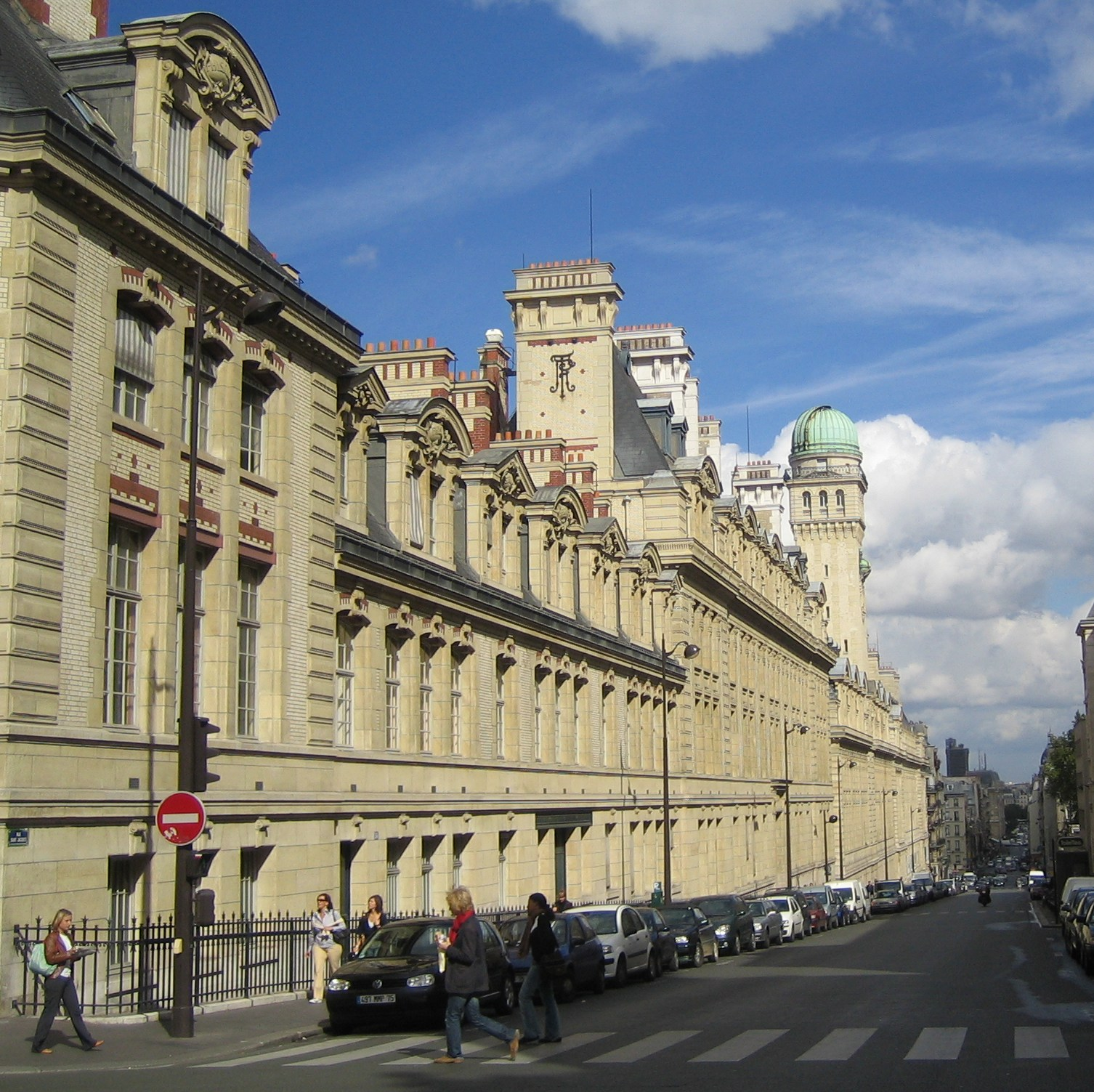
Rue Saint-Jacques and the Sorbonne in Paris

The scattered condition of the scholars in Paris often made lodging difficult. Some students rented rooms from townspeople, who often exacted high rates while the students demanded lower. This tension between scholars and citizens would have developed into a sort of civil war if Robert de Courçon had not found the remedy of taxation. It was upheld in the Bull of Gregory IX of 1231, but with an important modification: its exercise was to be shared with the citizens. The aim was to offer the students a shelter where they would fear neither annoyance from the owners nor the dangers of the world. Thus were founded the colleges (colligere, to assemble); meaning not centers of instruction, but simple student boarding-houses. Each had a special goal, being established for students of the same nationality or the same science. Often, masters lived in each college and oversaw its activities.

Four colleges appeared in the 12th century; they became more numerous in the 13th, including Collège d'Harcourt (1280) and the Collège de Sorbonne (1257). Thus the University of Paris assumed its basic form. It was composed of seven groups, the four nations of the faculty of arts, and the three superior faculties of theology, law, and medicine. Men who had studied at Paris became an increasing presence in the high ranks of the Church hierarchy; eventually, students at the University of Paris saw it as a right that they would be eligible to benefices. Church officials such as St. Louis and Clement IV lavishly praised the university.

Besides the famous Collège de Sorbonne, other collegia provided housing and meals to students, sometimes for those of the same geographical origin in a more restricted sense than that represented by the nations. There were 8 or 9 collegia for foreign students: the oldest one was the Danish college, the Collegium Dacicum, founded in 1257 and named after Dacia, the Latin term then used for Denmark. Swedish students could, during the 13th and 14th centuries, live in one of three Swedish colleges, the Collegium Upsaliense, the Collegium Scarense or the Collegium Lincopense, named after the Swedish dioceses of Uppsala, Skara and Linköping.

The Collège de Navarre was founded in 1305, originally aimed at students from Navarre, but due to its size, wealth, and the links between the crowns of France and Navarre, it quickly accepted students from other nations. The establishment of the College of Navarre was a turning point in the university's history: Navarra was the first college to offer teaching to its students, which at the time set it apart from all previous colleges, founded as charitable institutions that provided lodging, but no tuition. Navarre's model combining lodging and tuition would be reproduced by other colleges, both in Paris and other universities.

The German College, Collegium alemanicum is mentioned as early as 1345, the Scots college or Collegium scoticum was founded in 1325. The Lombard college or Collegium lombardicum was founded in the 1330s. The Collegium constantinopolitanum was, according to a tradition, founded in the 13th century to facilitate a merging of the eastern and western churches. It was later reorganized as a French institution, the Collège de la Marche-Winville. The Collège de Montaigu was founded by the archbishop of Rouen in the 14th century, and reformed in the 15th century by the humanist Jan Standonck, when it attracted reformers from within the Roman Catholic Church (such as Erasmus and Ignatius of Loyola) and those who subsequently became Protestants (John Calvin and John Knox).

At this time, the university also went through the controversy of the condemnations of 1210–1277.

The Irish College in Paris originated in 1578 with students dispersed between Collège Montaigu, Collège de Boncourt, and the Collège de Navarre; in 1677 it was awarded possession of the Collège des Lombards. A new Irish College was built in 1769 in rue du Cheval Vert (now rue des Irlandais), which exists today as the Irish Chaplaincy and Cultural centre.

=== 15th–18th century: Influence in France and Europe ===
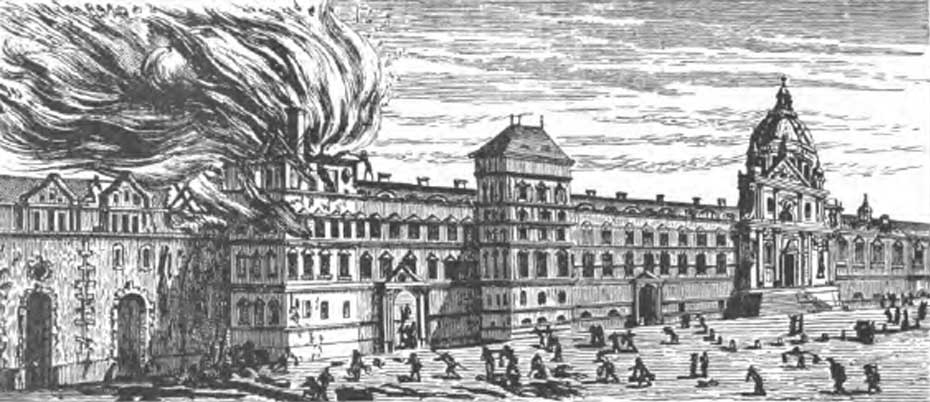
The Old Sorbonne on fire in 1670.

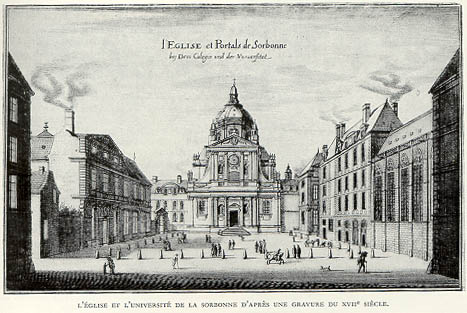
The Sorbonne, Paris, in a 17th-century engraving

In the fifteenth century, Guillaume d'Estouteville, a cardinal and Apostolic legate, reformed the university, correcting its perceived abuses and introducing various modifications. This reform was less an innovation than a recall to observance of the old rules, as was the reform of 1600, undertaken by the royal government with regard to the three higher faculties. Nonetheless, and as to the faculty of arts, the reform of 1600 introduced the study of Greek, of French poets and orators, and of additional classical figures like Hesiod, Plato, Demosthenes, Cicero, Virgil, and Sallust. The prohibition from teaching civil law was never well observed at Paris, but in 1679 Louis XIV officially authorized the teaching of civil law in the faculty of decretals. The "faculty of law" hence replaced the "faculty of decretals". The colleges meantime had multiplied; those of Cardinal Le-Moine and Navarre were founded in the fourteenth century. The Hundred Years' War was fatal to these establishments, but the university set about remedying the injury.

Besides its teaching, the University of Paris played an important part in several disputes: in the Church, during the Great Schism; in the councils, in dealing with heresies and divisions; in the State, during national crises. Under the domination of England it played a role in the trial of Joan of Arc.

Proud of its rights and privileges, the University of Paris fought energetically to maintain them, hence the long struggle against the mendicant orders on academic as well as on religious grounds. Hence also the shorter conflict against the Jesuits, who claimed by word and action a share in its teaching. It made extensive use of its right to decide administratively according to occasion and necessity. In some instances it openly endorsed the censures of the faculty of theology and pronounced condemnation in its own name, as in the case of the Flagellants.

Its patriotism was especially manifested on two occasions. During the captivity of King John, when Paris was given over to factions, the university sought to restore peace; and under Louis XIV, when the Spaniards crossed the Somme and threatened the capital, it placed two hundred men at the king's disposal and offered the Master of Arts degree gratuitously to scholars who should present certificates of service in the army (Jourdain, Hist. de l'Univers. de Paris au XVIIe et XVIIIe siècle, 132–34; Archiv. du ministère de l'instruction publique).

=== 1793: Abolition by the French Revolution ===
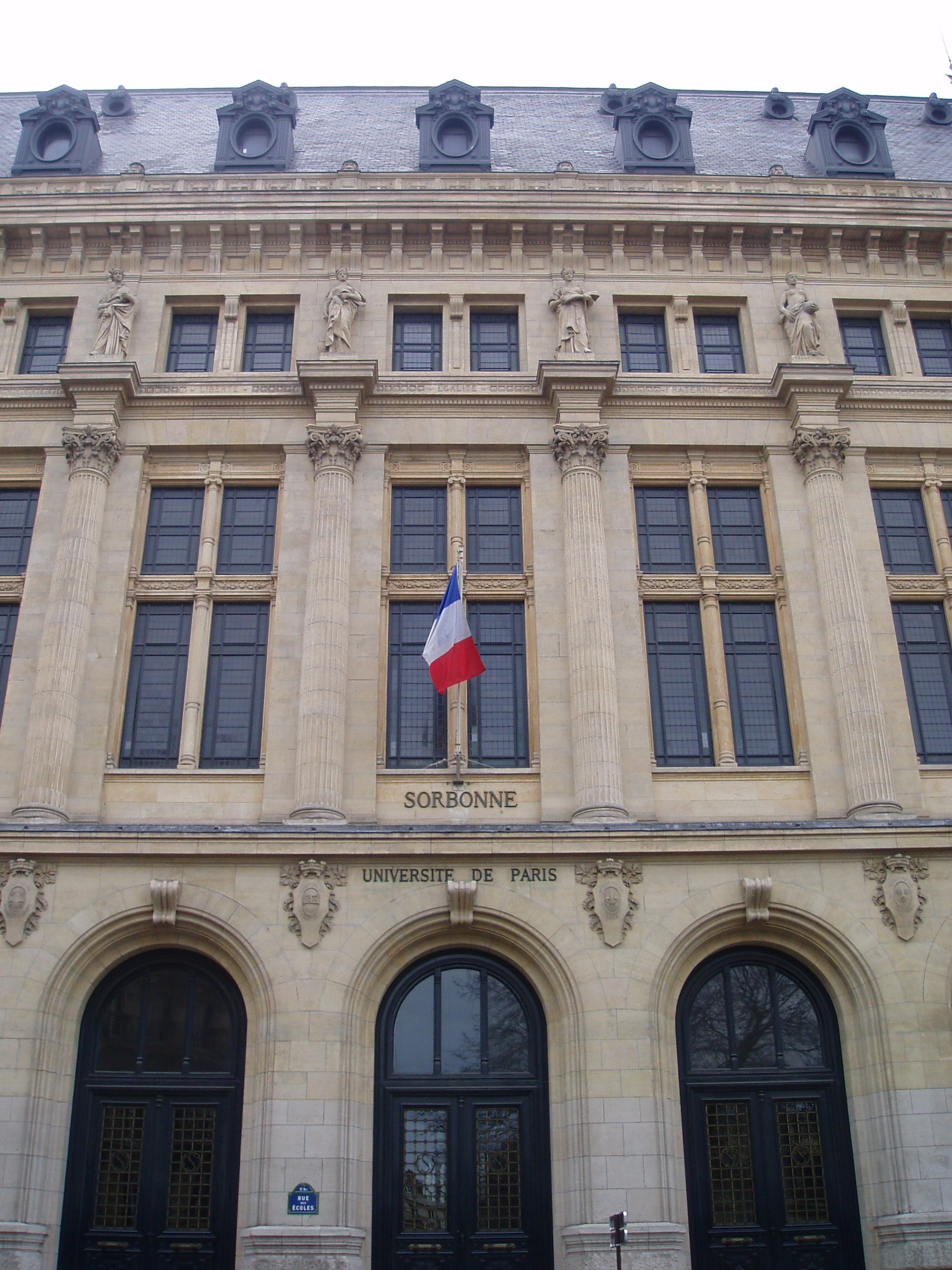
The Sorbonne as seen from rue des Écoles

The ancient university disappeared with the ancien régime in the French Revolution. On 15 September 1793, petitioned by the Department of Paris and several departmental groups, the National Convention decided that independently of the primary schools,

there should be established in the Republic three progressive degrees of instruction; the first for the knowledge indispensable to artisans and workmen of all kinds; the second for further knowledge necessary to those intending to embrace the other professions of society; and the third for those branches of instruction the study of which is not within the reach of all men.

Measures were to be taken immediately:

For means of execution the department and the municipality of Paris are authorized to consult with the Committee of Public Instruction of the National Convention, in order that these establishments shall be put in action by 1 November next, and consequently colleges now in operation and the faculties of theology, medicine, arts, and law are suppressed throughout the Republic.

This was the death-sentence of the university. It was not to be restored after the Revolution had subsided, no more than those of the provinces.

=== 1806–1968: Re-establishment ===
The university was re-established by Napoleon on 1 May 1806. All the faculties were replaced by a single centre, the University of France. The decree of 17 March 1808 created five distinct faculties: Law, Medicine, Letters/Humanities, Sciences, and Theology; traditionally, Letters and Sciences had been grouped together into one faculty, that of "Arts". After a century, people recognized that the new system was less favourable to study. The defeat of 1870 at the hands of Prussia was partially blamed on the growth of the superiority of the German university system of the 19th century, and led to another serious reform of the French university. In the 1880s, the "licence" (bachelor) degree is divided into, for the Faculty of Letters: Letters, Philosophy, History, Modern Languages, with French, Latin and Greek being requirements for all of them; and for the Faculty of Science, into: Mathematics, Physical Sciences and Natural Sciences; the Faculty of Theology is abolished by the Republic. At this time, the building of the Sorbonne was fully renovated.

==== Admission of women ====
From the 1860s onward, women were admitted to the University of Paris. Madeleine Brès was admitted alongside the American Mary Puttnam, the Russian Catherine Gontcharoff and the English Elizabeth Garrett - all holders of diplomas and bachelors in Arts and Sciences.

=== May 1968–1970: Shutdown ===
The student revolts of the late 1960s were caused in part by the French government's failure to plan for a sudden spike in the number of university students as a result of the postwar baby boom. The number of French university students skyrocketed from only 280,000 during the 1962–63 academic year to 500,000 in 1967–68, but at the start of the decade, there were only 16 public universities in the entire country. To accommodate this rapid growth, the government hastily developed bare-bones off-site faculties as annexes of existing universities (roughly equivalent to American satellite campuses). These faculties did not have university status of their own and lacked academic traditions and amenities to support student life or resident professors. One-third of all French university students ended up in these new faculties, and were ripe for radicalization as a result of being forced to pursue their studies in such shabby conditions.

In 1966, after a student revolt in Paris, Christian Fouchet, minister of education, proposed "the reorganisation of university studies into separate two- and four-year degrees, alongside the introduction of selective admission criteria" as a response to overcrowding in lecture halls. Dissatisfied with these educational reforms, students began protesting in November 1967, at the campus of the University of Paris in Nanterre; indeed, according to James Marshall, these reforms were seen "as the manifestations of the technocratic-capitalist state by some, and by others as attempts to destroy the liberal university". After student activists protested against the Vietnam War, the campus was closed by authorities on 22 March and again on 2 May 1968. Agitation spread to the Sorbonne the next day, and many students were arrested in the following week. Barricades were erected throughout the Latin Quarter, and a massive demonstration took place on 13 May, gathering students and workers on strike. The number of workers on strike reached about nine million by 22 May. As explained by Bill Readings:

De Gaulle responded on May 24 by calling for a referendum, and [...] the revolutionaries, led by informal action committees, attacked and burned the Paris Stock Exchange in response. The Gaullist government then held talks with union leaders, who agreed to a package of wage-rises and increases in union rights. The strikers, however, simply refused the plan. With the French state tottering, de Gaulle fled France on May 29 for a French military base in Germany. He later returned and, with the assurance of military support, announced [general] elections [within] forty days. [...] Over the next two months, the strikes were broken (or broke up) while the election was won by the Gaullists with an increased majority.

=== 1970: Dissolution ===
Following the disruption, de Gaulle appointed Edgar Faure as minister of education; Faure was assigned to prepare a legislative proposal for reform of the French university system, with the help of academics. Their proposal was adopted on 12 November 1968; in accordance with the new law, the faculties of the University of Paris were to reorganize themselves. This led to the division of the University of Paris into 13 universities, largely keeping faculties intact. Thus the new universities were mostly specialized by academic discipline.

In 2017, Paris IV and Paris VI universities merged to form the Sorbonne University. In 2019, Paris V and Paris VII universities merged to form the new Paris Cité University, leaving the number of successor universities at 11.

Number	Previous name	Current name	Faculties/institutes before breakup	Current subjects	Students	Academy
Paris I	University of Paris 1 Panthéon-Sorbonne		Faculty of Law and Economics (35 out of 41 of the economics Professors joined, along with a few professors from law) and the Faculty of Humanities. There were also Paris Institute of Geography, Paris Institute of Business Administration, part of Institute of Art and Archeology of the University of Paris	Humanities, Law, Social sciences, Economics	45,200	Paris
Paris II	Paris II Panthéon-Assas	Paris-Panthéon-Assas University	Faculty of Law and Economics of Paris (88 out of 108 of the law professors joined, along with a few professors from Economics), and Graduate Institute of International Studies	Law, Political Science, Economics	17,705	Paris
Paris III	New Sorbonne University		Faculty of Humanities accompanined by Institute of Linguistics of Paris, Institute for Advanced Latin American Studies of the University of Paris	Humanities	19,360	Paris
Paris IV	Paris-Sorbonne University	Sorbonne University	Faculty of Humanities, along with Institute of Slavic Studies of the University of Paris, and Institute of Musicology of the University of Paris	Humanities	55,600	Paris
Paris VI	Pierre-and-Marie-Curie University	Sorbonne University	Faculty of Science, Faculty of Medicine, National School of Chemistry, and Paris Institute of Earth Physics (until 1990)	Science, Medicine	55,600	Paris
Paris V	Paris Descartes University	Paris Cité University	Faculty of Humanities, Faculty of Medicine, Faculty of Pharmacy, Paris Institute of Psychology, Paris Institute of Pharmacotechnics and Pharmacodynamics, Avenue de Versailles University Institute of Technology, and Paris Institute of Molecular Pathology.	Medicine, Social sciences, Humanities	64,100	Paris
Paris VII	Paris Diderot University	Paris Cité University	Faculty of Sciences, Faculty of Letters, and Faculty of Medicine	Science, Medicine, Humanities, Social sciences, Arts	64,100	Paris
Paris VIII	University of Vincennes	Paris 8 University Vincennes-Saint-Denis	Vincennes University Center (Most professors were from Faculty of Humanities)	Social sciences	14,070	Créteil
Paris IX	Paris-IX University	Paris Dauphine University - PSL (grande école of PSL University)	Dauphine University Center (The professors were from the Department of Economics of the Faculty of Law and Economics)	Mathematics, Computer Science, Management, Economics, Finance, Law, Political Science, Journalism	10,000	Créteil
Paris X	Université Paris Ouest	Paris Nanterre University	Faculty of Law and Economics and Faculty of Humanities in Nanterre, along with Ville-d'Avray University Institute of Technology	Law, humanities, political science, social and natural sciences and economics.	32,000	Versailles
Paris XI	Université Paris-Sud	Paris-Saclay University	Faculty of Science in Orsay (Fourth Faculty of Sciences), Institut Gustave Roussy, Institute of Nuclear Physics of the University of Paris, Orsay University Institute of Technology, Cachan University Institute of Technology, and Sceaux University Institute of Technology	Medicine, Science, Law, Economics	60,000	Versailles
Paris XII	Université Paris-Est	Paris-East Créteil University	University Hospital Center (In French: Centre hospitalier universitaire, CHU) Henri-Mondor, Faculty of Law and Economics in Créteil, Varenne-Saint-Hilaire University Center, and Planning Institute of Paris	Medicine, Science	32,156	Créteil
Paris XIII	Université Paris Nord	Sorbonne Paris North University	Faculty of Sciences of Paris in Villetaneuse (Third Faculty of Sciences), Faculty of Law and Economics, Saint-Denis University Center - Villetaneuse, and Saint-Denis University Institutes of Technology	Science, Social sciences, Medicine, Law	23,078	Créteil

The successor universities to the University of Paris are now split over of the Île-de-France region.

Most of these successor universities have joined several groups of universities and higher education institutions in the Paris region, created in the 2010s.

== Notable people ==
=== Faculty ===
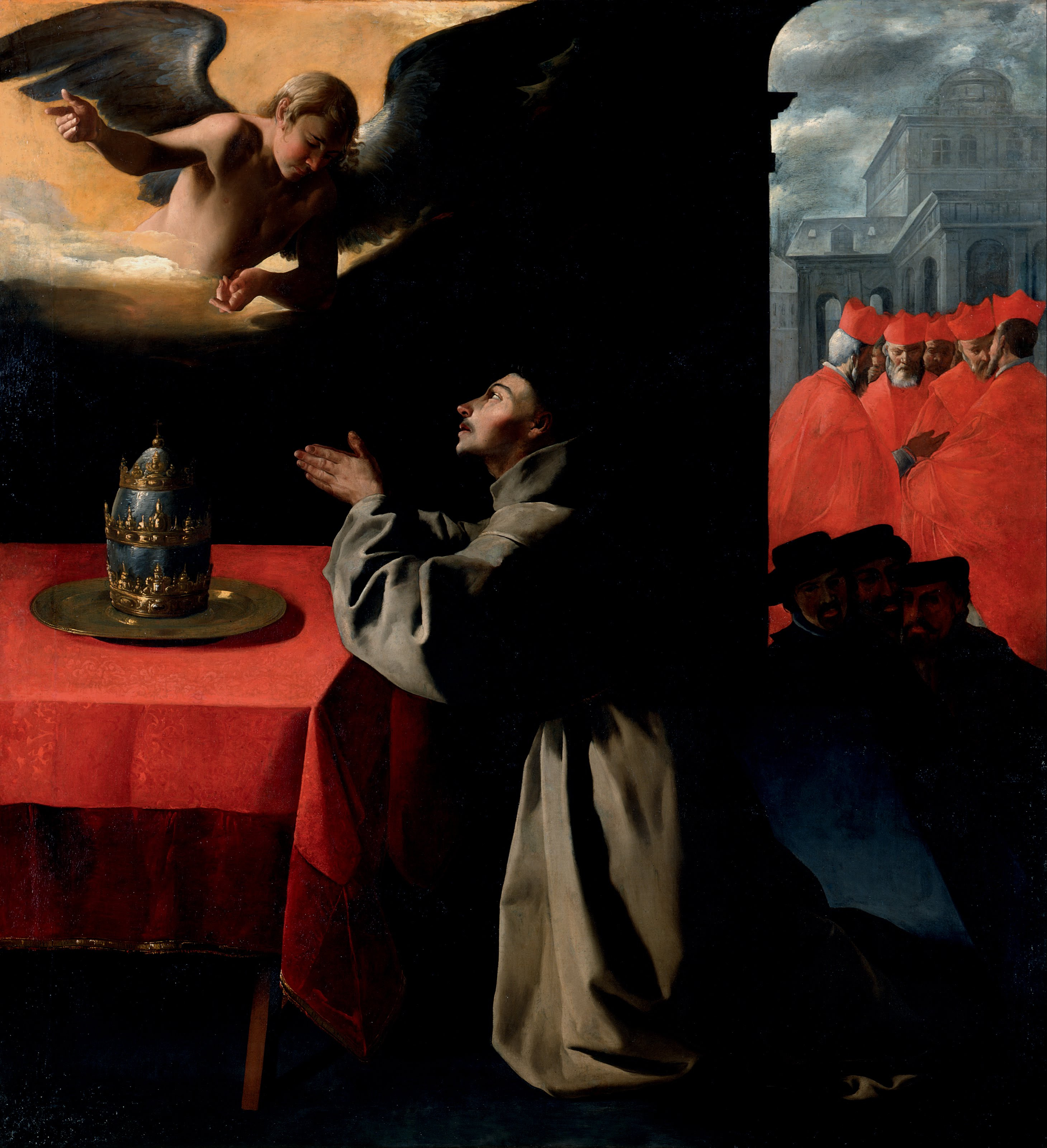
Bonaventure

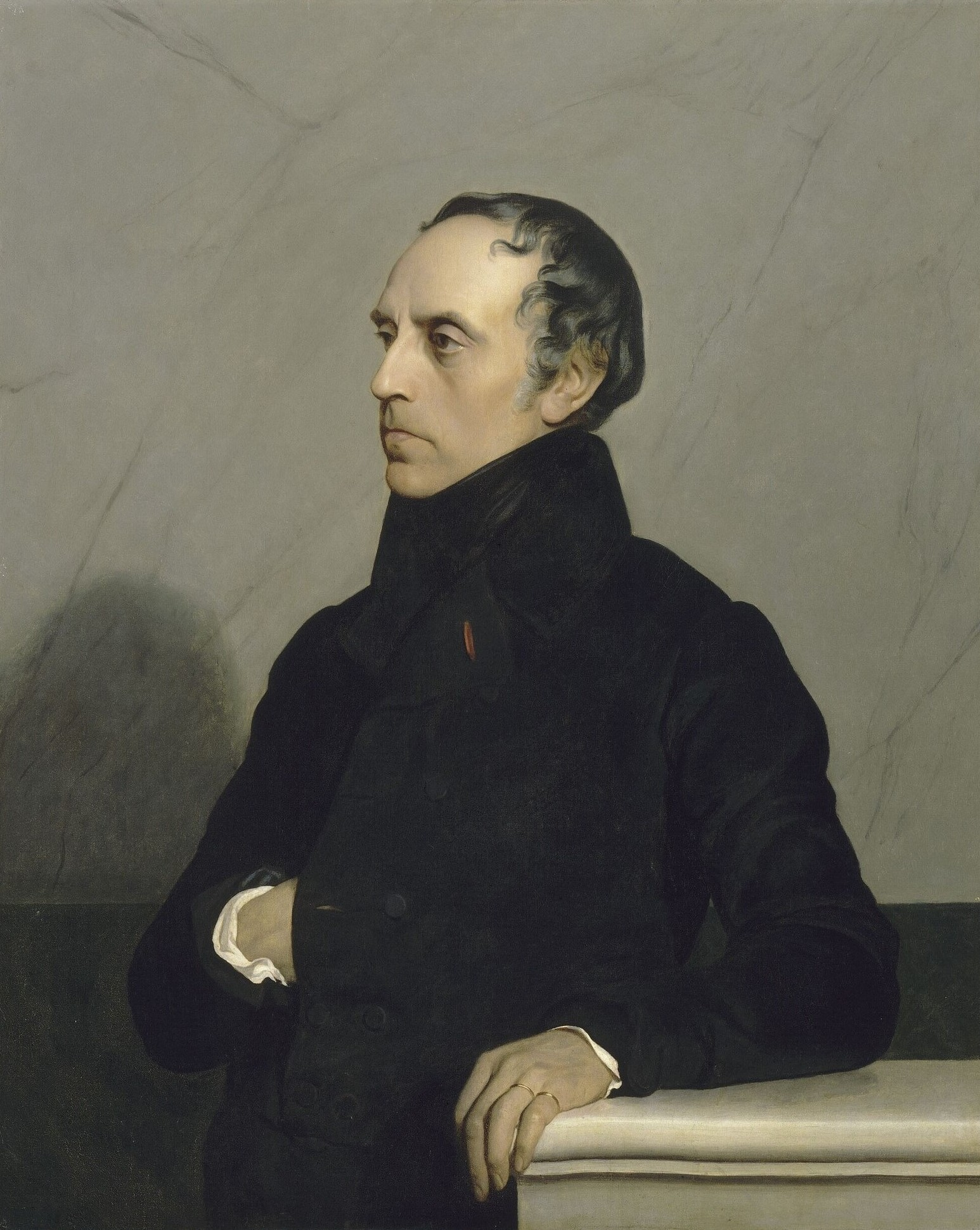
François Guizot

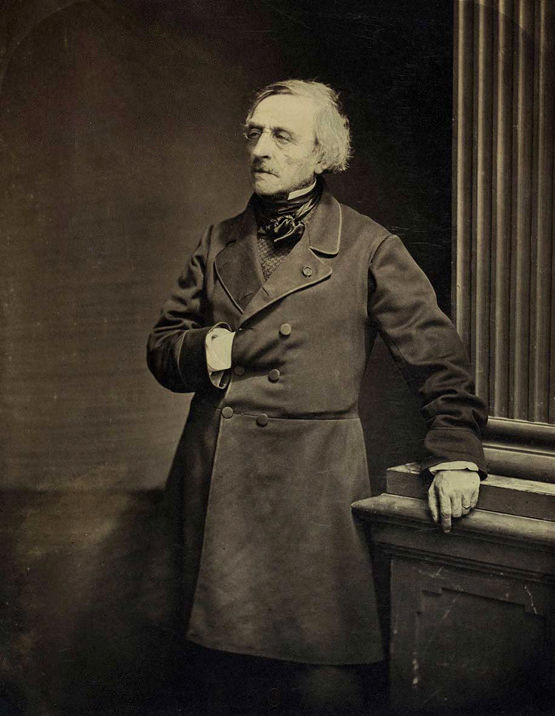
Jean-Jacques Ampère

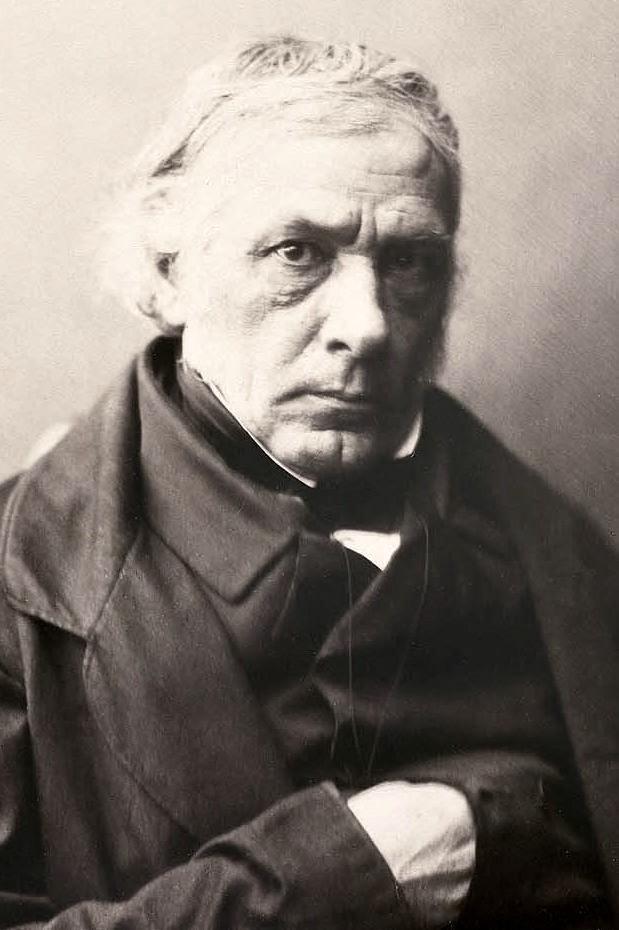
Victor Cousin

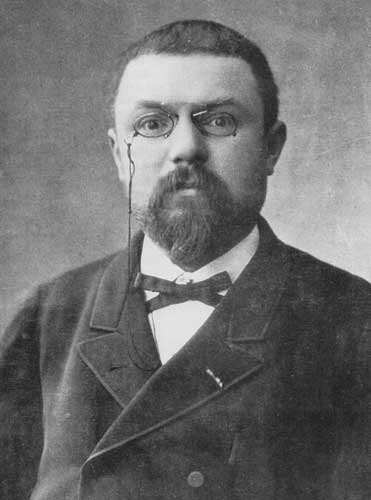
Henri Poincaré

=== Alumni ===
The Sorbonne has educated 11 French presidents, almost 50 French heads of government, three Popes (Innocent III, Celestine II, and Adrian IV), and many other political and social figures. The Sorbonne has also educated leaders of Albania, Canada, the Dominican Republic, Gabon, Guinea, Iraq, Jordan, Kosovo, Tunisia, and Niger among others.

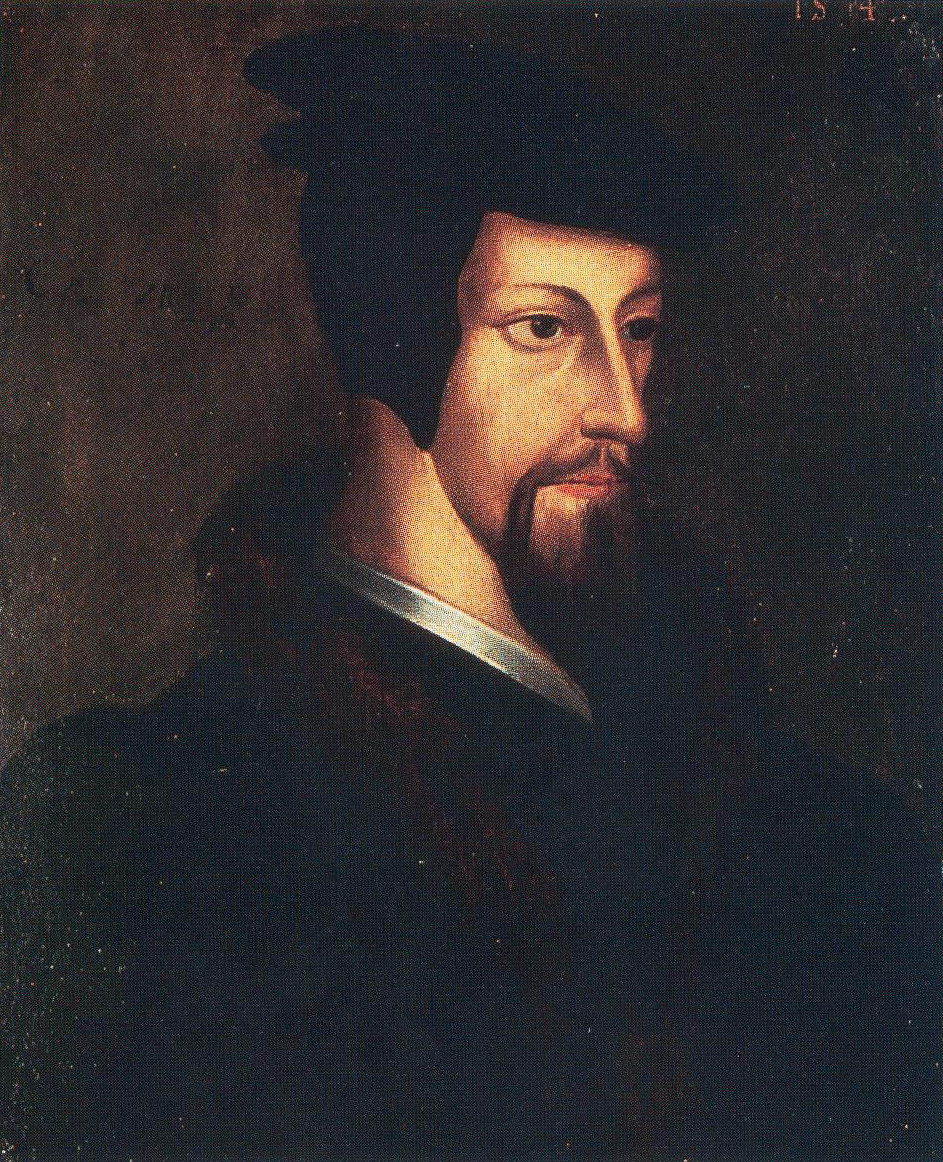
John Calvin

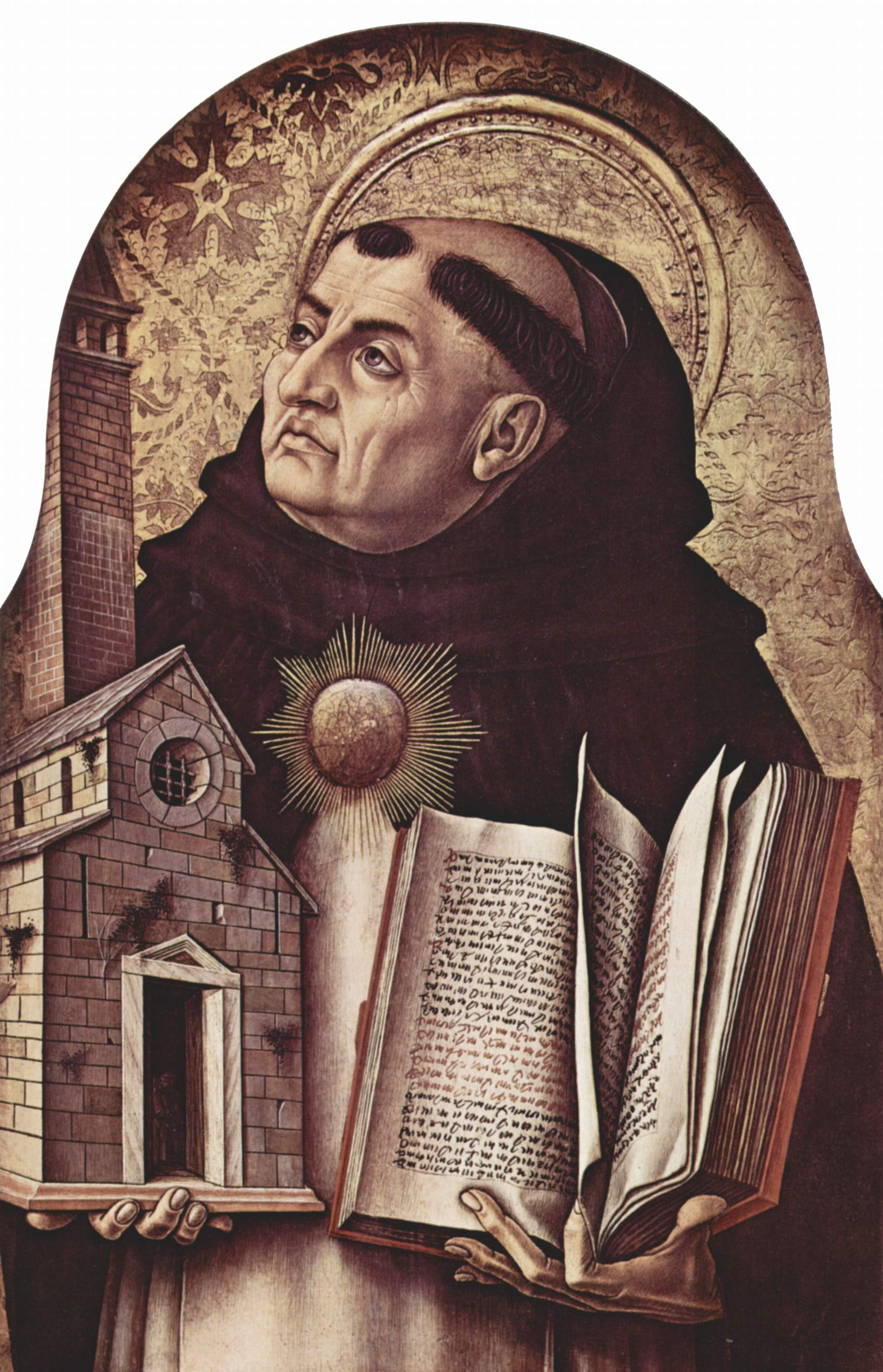
Thomas Aquinas

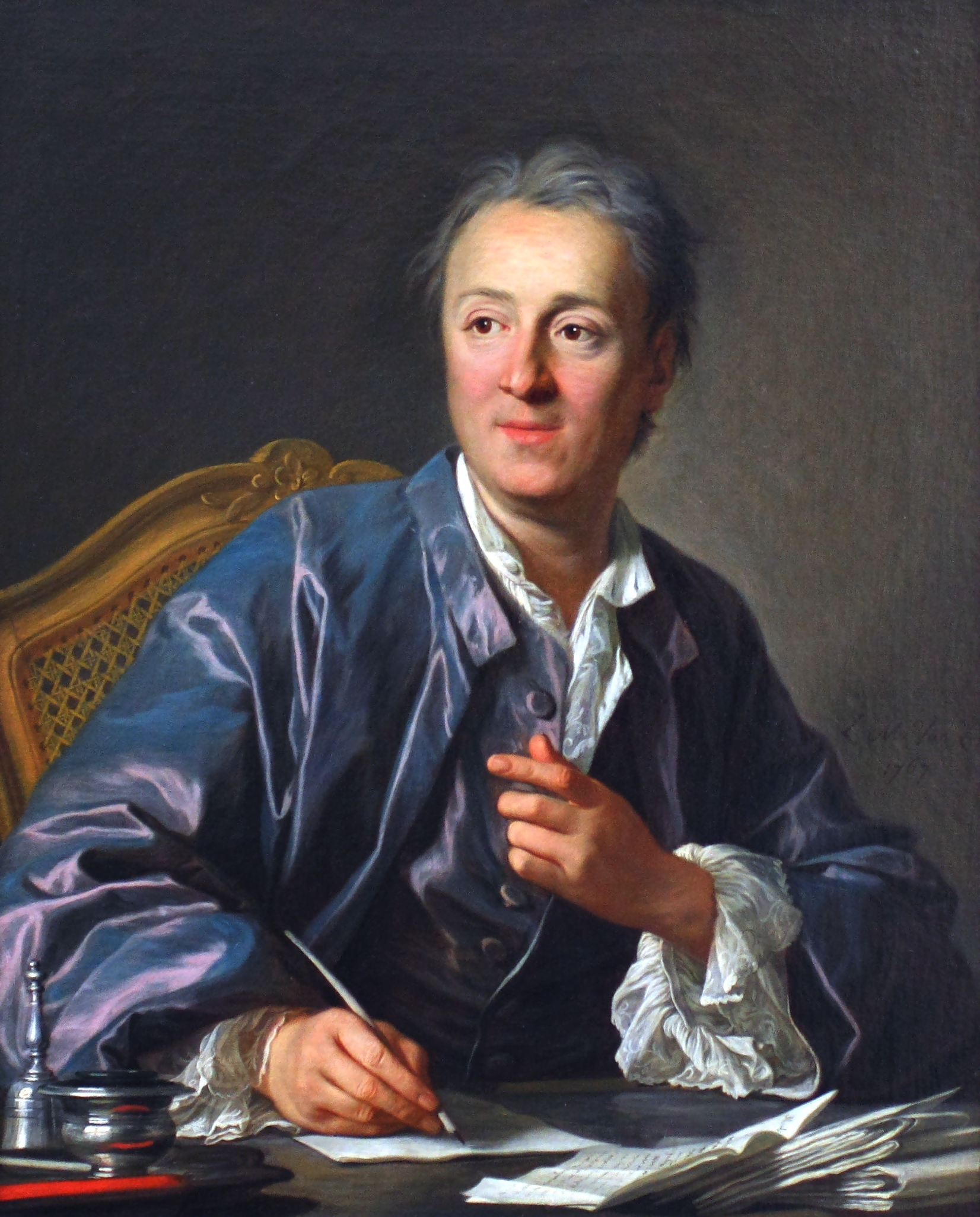
Denis Diderot

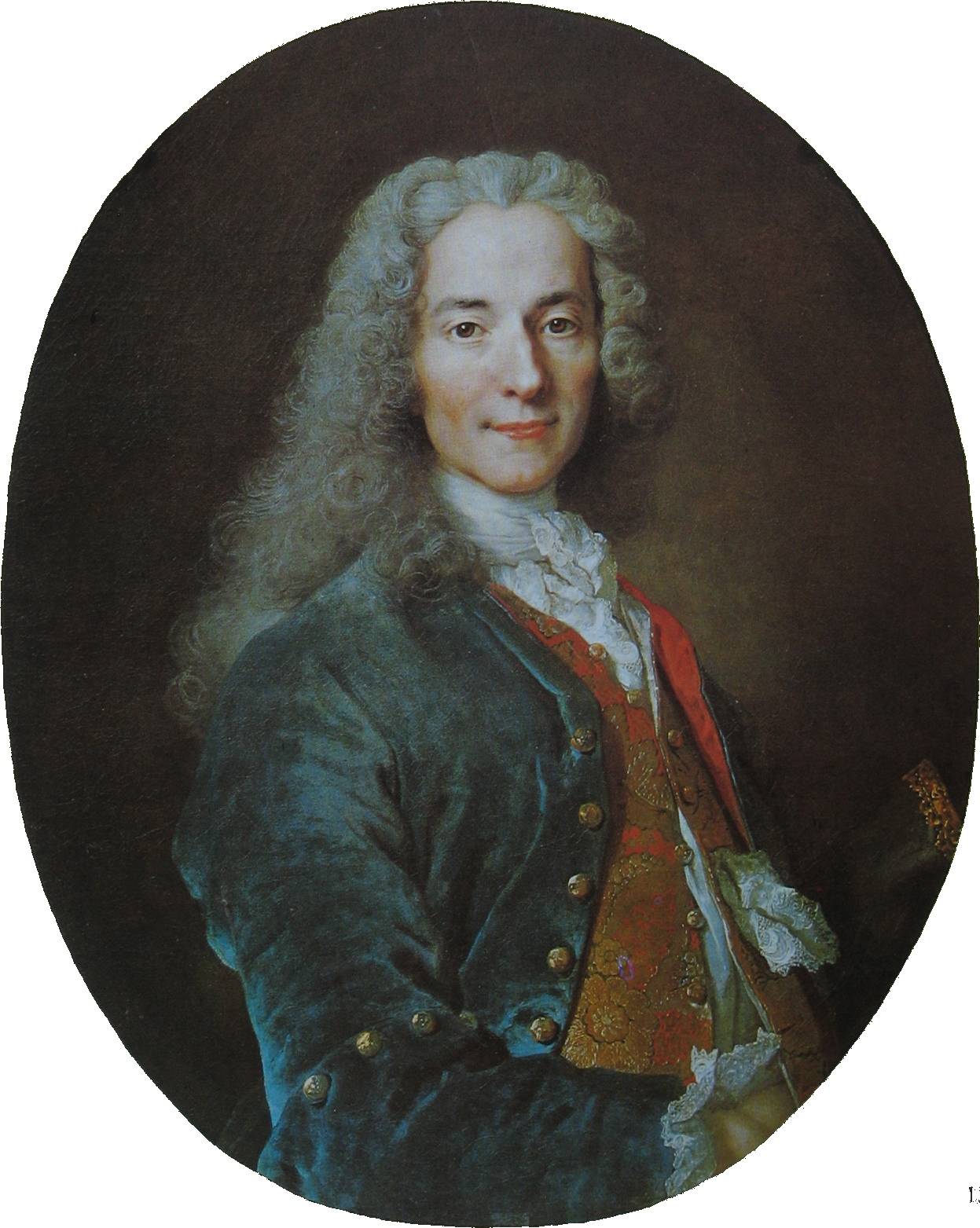
Voltaire

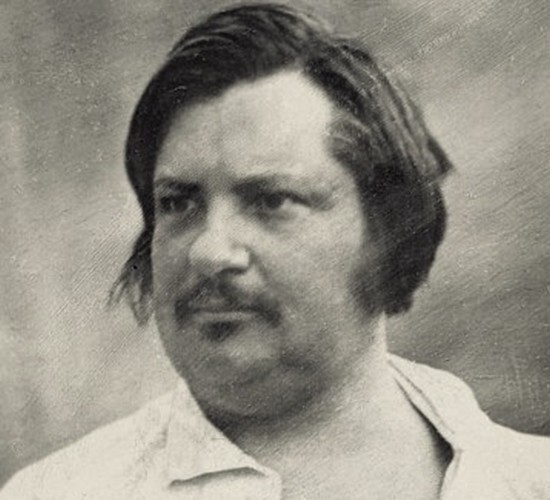
Honoré de Balzac
- Rodolfo Robles, physician
- Albert Simard, physician, activist during and post WWII.
- Carlos Alvarado-Larroucau, writer
- Paul Biya, President of Cameroon
- Jean-François Delmas, archivist, director of the Bibliothèque Inguimbertine and the museums of Carpentras
- Aklilu Habte-Wold, Ethiopian politician who served in Haile Selassie's cabinet
- Leonardo López Luján, Mexican archaeologist and director of the Templo Mayor Project
- Darmin Nasution, Coordinating Minister for Economic Affairs of Indonesia
- Maria Vasillievna Pavlova (née Gortynskaia) (1854–1939), paleontologist and academician
- Jean Peyrelevade, French civil servant, politician and business leader.
- Issei Sagawa, cannibal and murderer
- Tamara Gräfin von Nayhauß, German television presenter
- Michel Sapin, Deputy Minister of Justice from May 1991 to April 1992, Finance Minister from April 1992 to March 1993, and Minister of Civil Servants and State Reforms from March 2000 to May 2002.
- Menachem Mendel Schneerson, Head of the Chabad-Lubavitch movement
- Ali Abu el-Fotoh, was one of the most influential Egyptian economists from the 19th-century
- Ahmad al-Tayyeb, Grand Imam of Al-Azhar
- Pol Theis, attorney, interior designer, and founder of P&T Interiors in New York City
- Jean-Pierre Thiollet, French writer
- Loïc Vadelorge, French historian
- Yves-Marie Bercé, historian, winner of the Madeleine Laurain-Portemer Prize of the Académie des sciences morales et politiques and member of the Académie des sciences morales et politiques
- Phulrenu Guha, Indian Bengali politician and educationist, class of 1928
- Antoine Compagnon, professor of French literature at the Collège de France
- Anatole Félix Le Double, anatomist, physician, and academic
- Philippe Contamine, historian, member of the Académie des inscriptions et belles-lettres
- Pridi Banomyong, a Thai politician and professor who played an important role in drafting Thailand's first constitutions.
- Denis Crouzet, Renaissance historian, winner of the Madeleine Laurain-Portemer Prize of the Académie des sciences morales et politiques
- Marc Fumaroli, member of the Académie française and professor at the Collège de France
- Olivier Forcade, historian of Political and International relations at the University of Paris-Sorbonne and Sciences-Po Paris, member of the French National Council of Universities
- Edith Philips, American writer and educator
- Jean Favier, historian, member of the Académie des inscriptions et belles-lettres, president of the French Commission for UNESCO
- Nicolas Grimal, egyptologist, winner of the Gaston-Maspero prize of the Académie des inscriptions et belles-lettres et member of the Académie des inscriptions et belles-lettres, winner of the Diane Potier-Boes Prize of the Académie française.
- John Kneller (1916–2009), English-American professor and fifth president of Brooklyn College
- Claude Lecouteux, professor of Medieval German literature, winner of the Strasbourg Prize of the Académie française
- Jean-Luc Marion, French philosopher, member of the Académie française
- Tôn Nữ Thị Ninh, former ambassador of Vietnam to the European Union
- Danièle Pistone, Musicologist, member of the Académie des beaux-arts
- Jean-Yves Tadié, professor of French literature, Grand Prize of the Académie française
- Jean Tulard, historian, member of the Académie des sciences morales et politiques
- Khieu Samphan, former Khmer Rouge leader and head of state of Democratic Kampuchea
- Haïm Brézis, French mathematician who mainly works in functional analysis and partial differential equations
- Philippe G. Ciarlet, French mathematician, known particularly for his work on mathematical analysis of the finite element method. He has contributed also to elasticity, to the theory of plates and shells and differential geometry
- Gérard Férey, was a French chemist who specialized in the Physical chemistry of solids and materials. He focused on the crystal chemistry of inorganic fluorides and on porous solids
- Jacques-Louis Lions, was a French mathematician who made contributions to the theory of partial differential equations and to stochastic control, among other areas
- Marc Yor, was a French mathematician well known for his work on stochastic processes, especially properties of semimartingales, Brownian motion and other Lévy processes, the Bessel processes, and their applications to mathematical finance
- Bernard Derrida, a French theoretical physicist. He is best known for his work in statistical mechanics, and is the eponym of Derrida plots, an analytical technique for characterising differences between Boolean networks.
- François Loeser, a French mathematician who specialized in algebraic geometry and is best known for his work on motivic integration, part of it in collaboration with Jan Denef
- Achille Mbembe, Cameroonian Intellectual historian, Political philosophy, author of On the Postcolony, introduced the concept of necropolitics
- Claire Voisin, French mathematician known for her work in algebraic geometry
- Jean-Michel Coron, French mathematician who studied the control theory of partial differential equations, and which includes both control and stabilization
- Michel Talagrand, French mathematician specialized in functional analysis and probability theory and their applications
- Claude Cohen-Tannoudji, French physicist who specialized in methods of laser cooling and trapping atoms
- Serge Haroche, French physicist who specialized in quantum physics, whose other works developed laser spectroscopy
- Riad Al Solh, First Prime-minister of Lebanon
- Benal Nevzat İstar Arıman (1903–1990), one of the first woman members of the Turkish parliament (1935)
- Abdulrahman Ghassemlou (1930–1989), Kurdish politician and secretary-general for the KDPI, assassinated by Iranian agents 13 July 1989 in Vienna, Austria.
- Abdelkebir Khatibi, Moroccan literary critic, novelist, philosopher, playwright, poet, and sociologist
- Muhammad Shahidullah, Bengali linguist, educationalist, and social reformer
- Raphael Armattoe, Ghanaian medical doctor, politician, poet and writer
- Wu Songgao (1898–1953), Republic of China politician, jurist and political scientist
- Rostislav Doboujinsky (1903-2000), Russian designer
- Barbara Jo Allen (1906–1974), American actress
- Inam Karimov, Chief Justice of Supreme Court of Azerbaijan
- Gérard de Vaucouleurs, French observational astronomer known for his work on galaxies
- Lucien Abenhaim Pharmacoepidemiologist, professor of public health, and former general director of health for France.
- Nadine Ribault (1964–2021), French writer and translator
- Élodie Yung, French actress
- Fatema Mernissi (1940–2015), Moroccan feminist writer and sociologist

=== Nobel laureates ===
==== Alumni ====
Nobel Prize winners who had attended the University of Paris or one of its thirteen successors are:

1. [Ph.] Albert Fert (PhD) – 2007
2. [Ph.] Alfred Kastler (DSc) – 1966
3. [Ph.] Gabriel Lippmann (DSc) – 1908
4. [Ph.] Jean Perrin (DSc) – 1926
5. [Ph.] Louis Néel (MSc) – 1970
6. [Ph.] Louis de Broglie (DSc) – 1929
7. [Ph.] [Ch.] Marie Curie (DSc) – 1903, 1911
8. [Ph.] Pierre Curie (DSc) – 1903
9. [Ph.] Pierre-Gilles de Gennes (DSc) – 1991
10. [Ph.] Serge Haroche (PhD, DSc) – 2012
11. [Ch.] Frédéric Joliot-Curie (DSc) – 1935
12. [Ch.] Gerhard Ertl (Attendee) – 2007
13. [Ch.] Henri Moissan (DSc) – 1906
14. [Ch.] Irène Joliot-Curie (DSc) – 1935
15. [Ch.] Jacobus Henricus van 't Hoff (Attendee) – 2007
16. [PM] André Frédéric Cournand (M.D) – 1956
17. [PM] André Lwoff (M.D, DSc) – 1965
18. [PM] Bert Sakmann (Attendee) – 1991
19. [PM] Charles Nicolle (M.D) – 1928
20. [PM] Charles Richet (M.D, DSc) – 1913
21. [PM] François Jacob (M.D) – 1965
22. [PM] Françoise Barré-Sinoussi (PhD) – 2008
23. [PM] Jacques Monod (DSc) – 1965
24. [PM] Jean Dausset (MD) – 1980
25. [PM] Luc Montagnier (MD) – 2008
26. [Ec.] Gérard Debreu (DSc) – 1983
27. [Ec.] Maurice Allais (D.Eng.) – 1988
28. [Ec.] Jean Tirole (PhD) – 2014
29. [Pe.] Albert Schweitzer (PhD) – 1952
30. [Pe.] Charles Albert Gobat (Attendee) – 1902
31. [Pe.] Ferdinand Buisson (DLitt) – 1927
32. [Pe.] Léon Bourgeois (DCL) – 1920
33. [Pe.] Louis Renault (DCL) – 1907
34. [Pe.] René Cassin (DCL) – 1968
35. [Li.] Giorgos Seferis (LLB) – 1963
36. [Li.] Henri Bergson (B.A) – 1927
37. [Li.] Jean-Paul Sartre (B.A) – 1964
38. [Li.] Patrick Modiano (Attendee) – 2014
39. [Li.] Romain Rolland (D Litt) – 1915
40. [Li.] T.S.Eliot (Attendee) – 1979
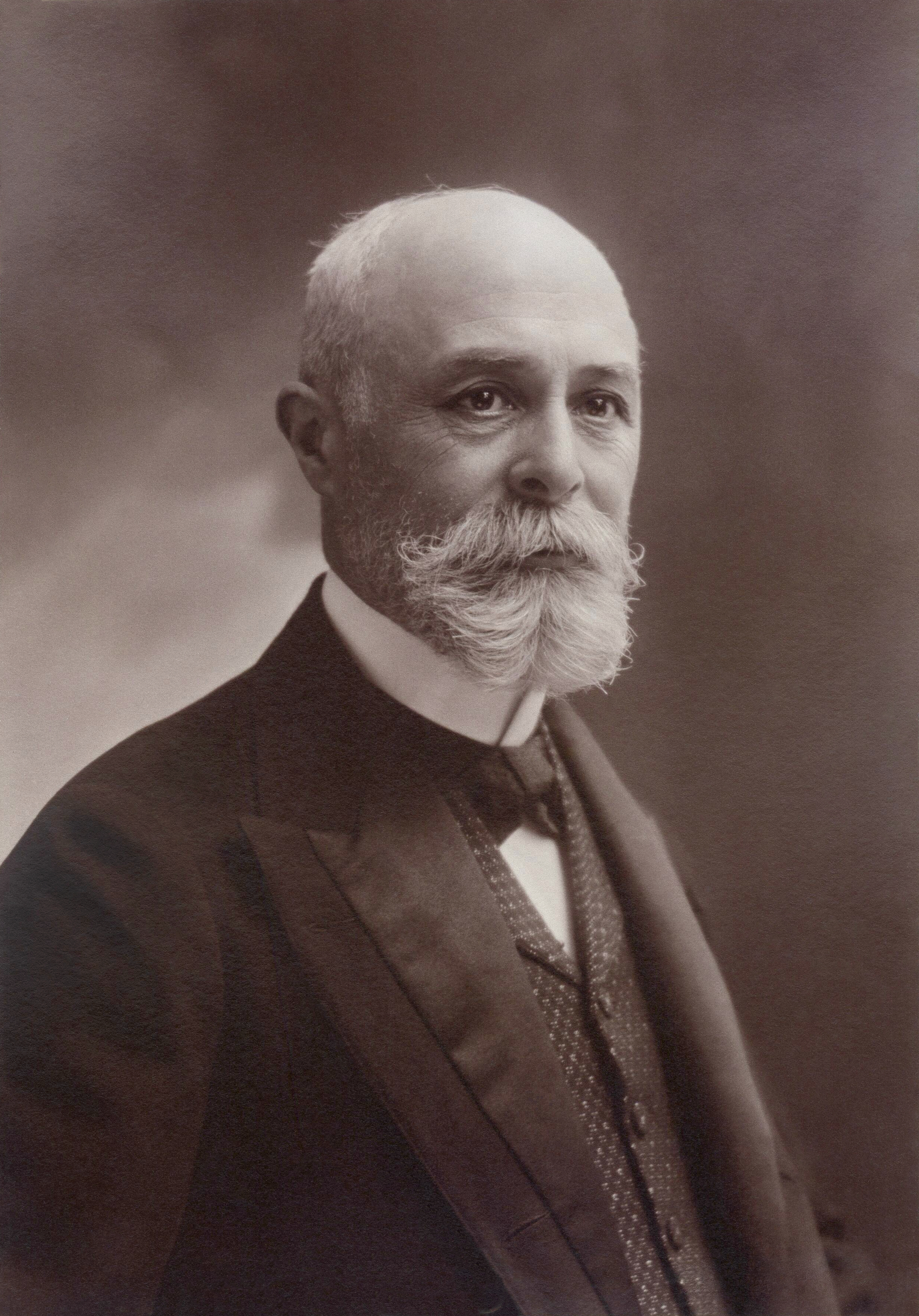
Antoine-Henri Becquerel

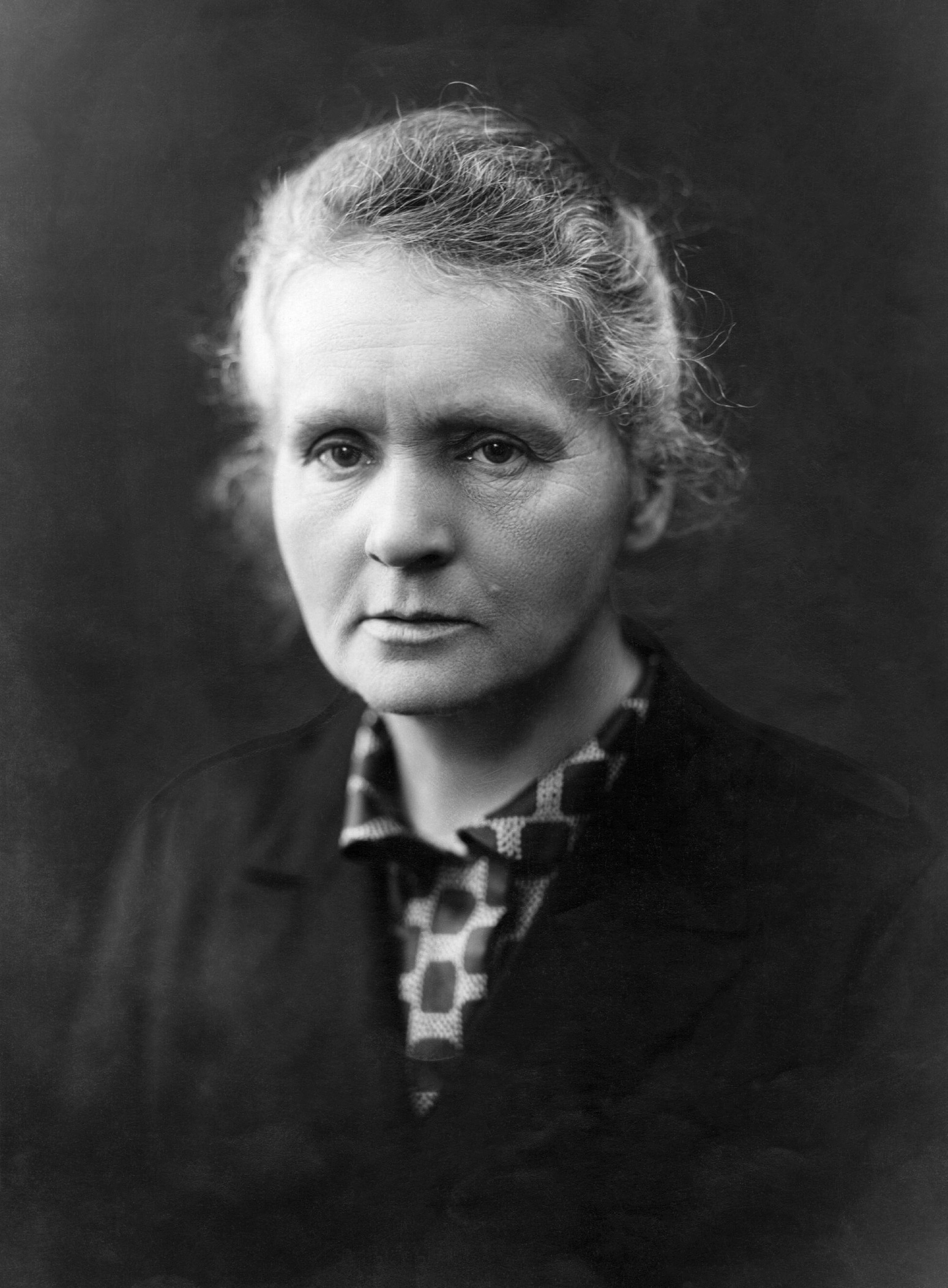
Marie Skłodowska Curie

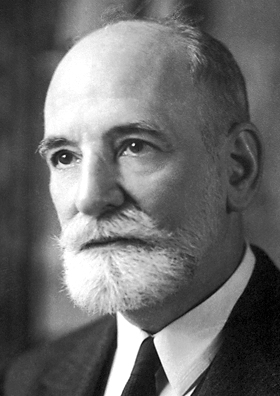
René Cassin

Henri Bergson

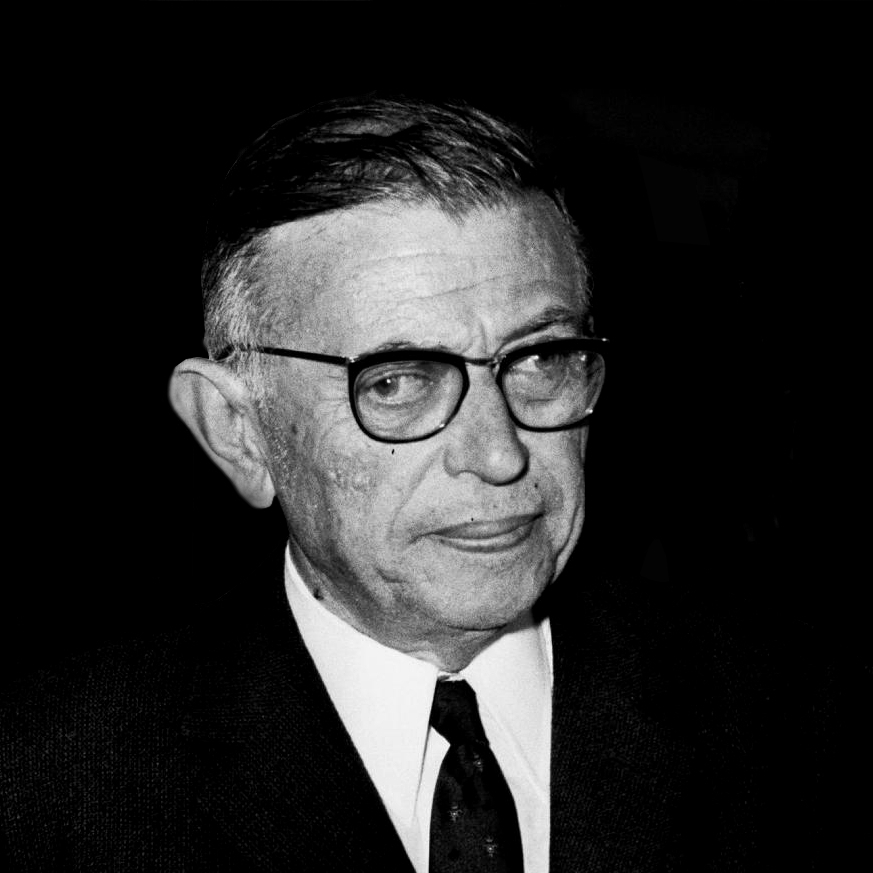
Jean-Paul Sartre

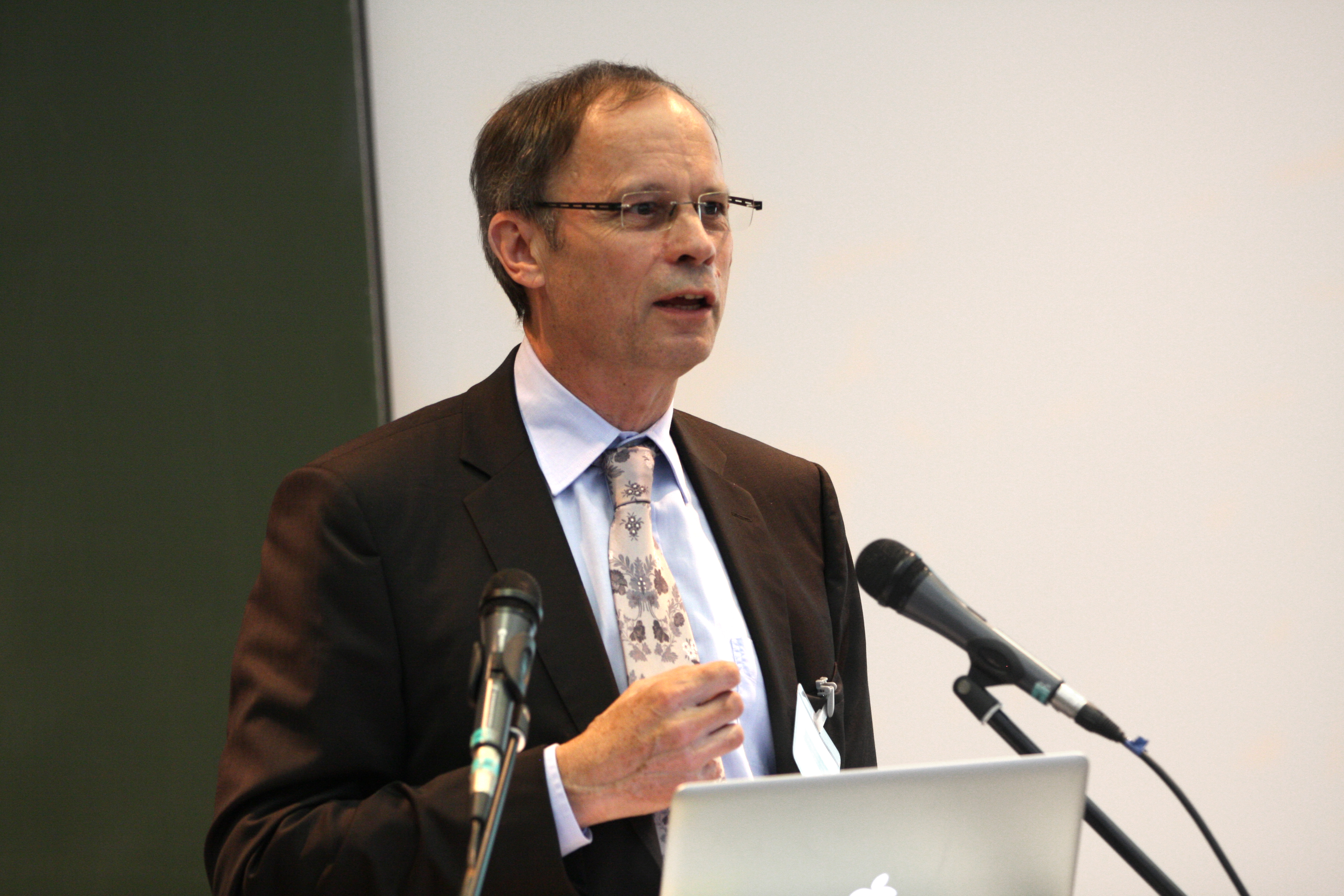
Jean Tirole

==== Faculty ====
List of Nobel Prize winners who were affiliated with the University of Paris or one of its thirteen successors.

1. [Ph.] George Smoot (Professor) – 2006
2. [Ph.] Gabriel Lippmann (Professor) – 1908*
3. [Ph.] Jean Perrin (Professor) – 1926*
4. [Ph.] Louis de Broglie (Professor) – 1929*
5. [Ph.][Ch.] Marie Curie (Professor) – 1903*, 1911*
6. [Ph.] Alfred Kastler (Researcher) – 1966
7. [Ch.] Henri Moissan (Professor) – 1906*
8. [Ch.] Irène Joliot-Curie (Professor) – 1935*
9. [Ch.] Peter Debye (Visiting Lecturer) – 1936
10. [PM] Charles Richet (Professor) – 1913*
11. [PM] Jules Bordet (Researcher) – 1919
12. [PM] Roger Guillemin (Researcher) – 1977
13. [PM] Jean Dausset (Professor) – 1980*
14. [Pe.] Louis Renault (Professor) – 1907*
15. [Li.] T.S. Eliot (Visitor) – 1948
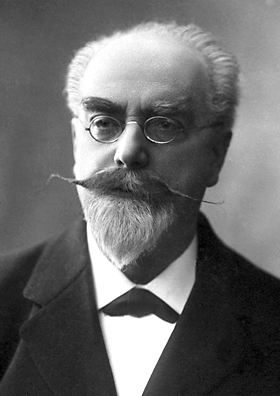
Gabriel Lippmann

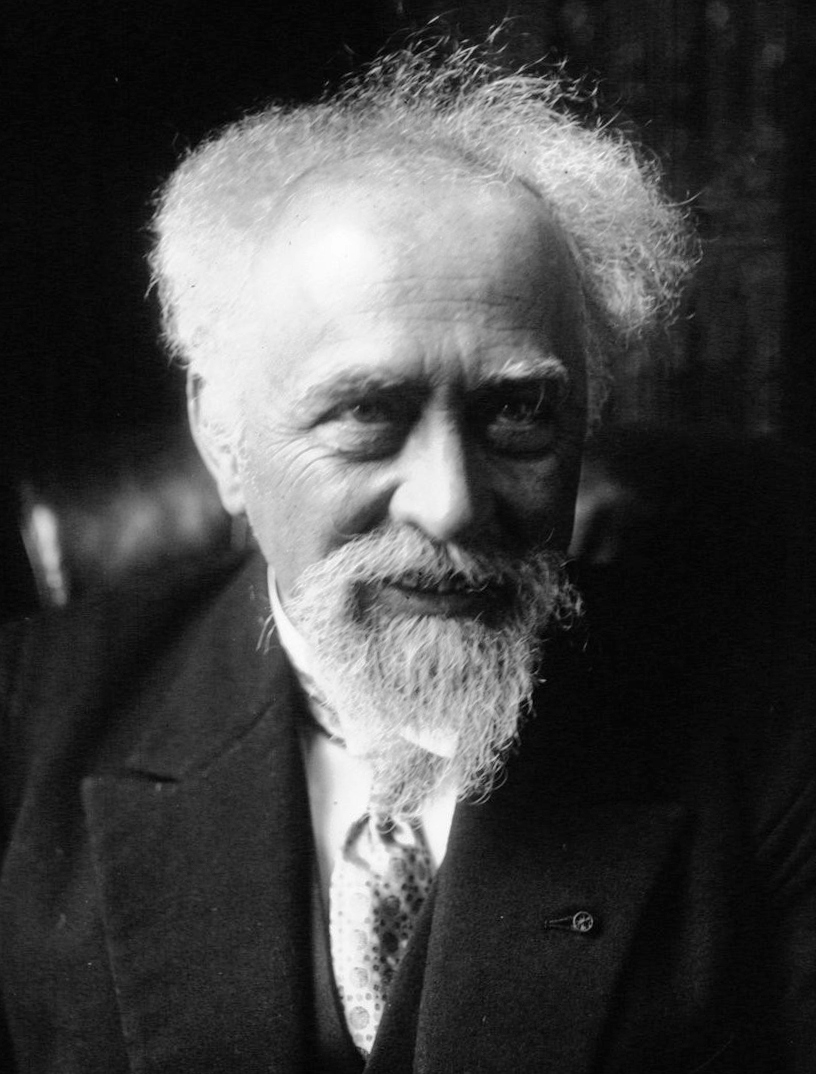
Jean Perrin

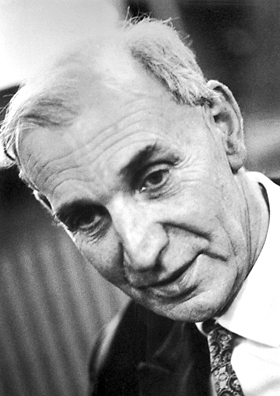
Alfred Kastler

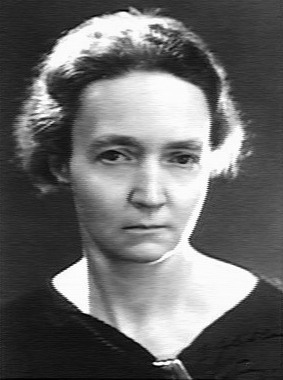
Irène Joliot-Curie

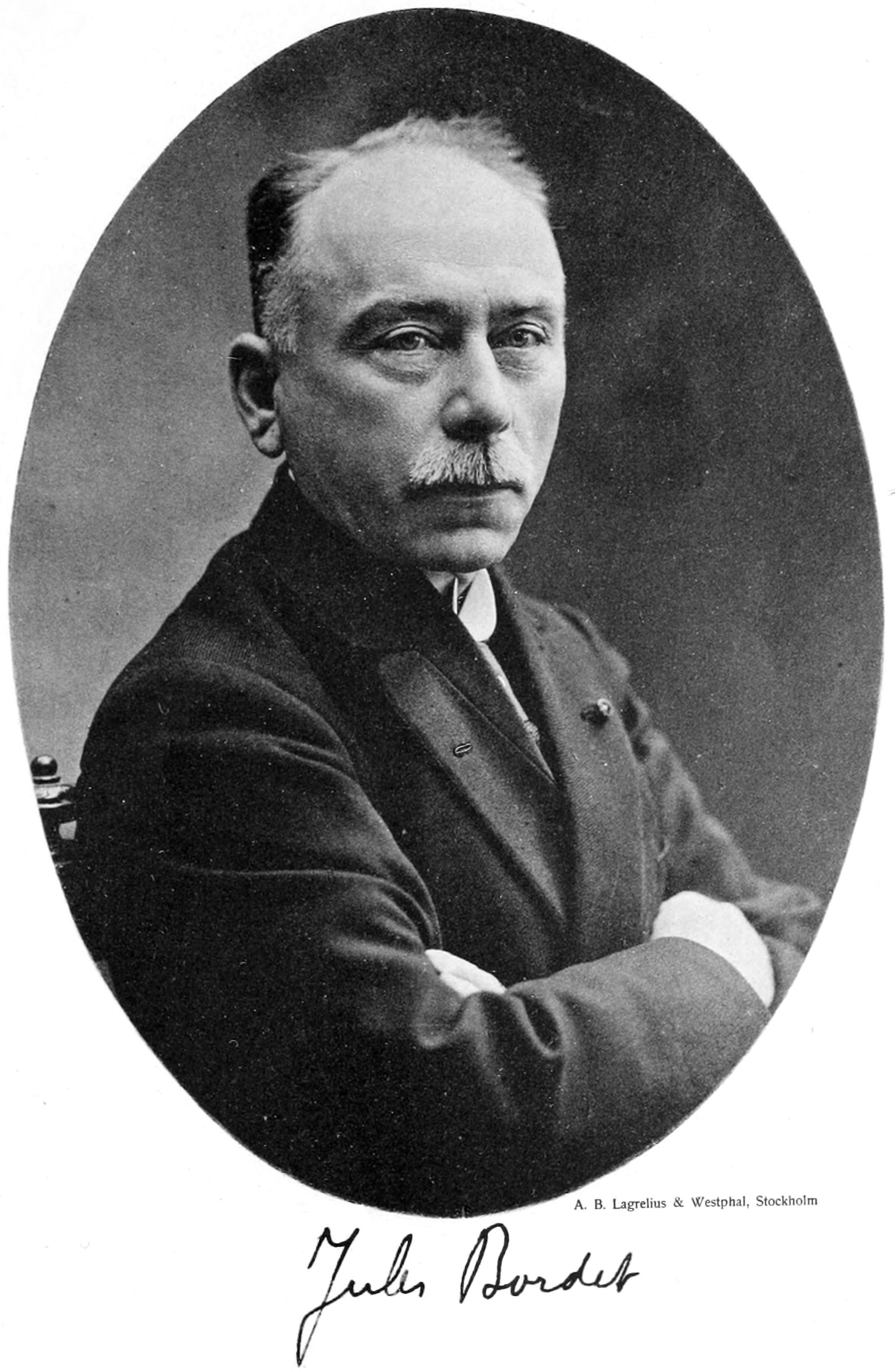
Jules Bordet

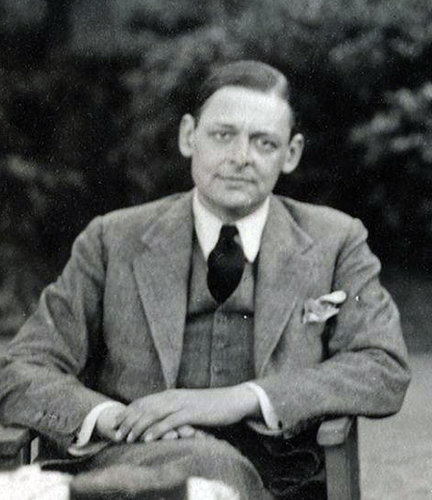
T. S. Eliot

== See also ==
- Royal Commission on Animal Magnetism – 1784 French scientific bodies' investigations involving systematic controlled trials
- Faculty of Law of Paris – Faculty of the University of Paris
- List of split up universities
- List of medieval universities
