= Collège des Dix-Huit =

College of the University of Paris

Collège des Dix-Huit (College of the Eighteen), founded in 1180 AD, was the earliest college of the University of Paris in France, established to endow 18 scholars.

== History ==
The college was founded in 1180 AD by an Englishman by the name of Jocius after a visit to Jerusalem. It was based south of the rue des Poirées.

In Warriors of the Cloisters: The Central Origins of Science in the Medieval World, Christopher Beckwith argues that Collège des Dix-Huit was modeled on the Central Asian madrasa: "The college founded by Jocius is identical ... to the typical madrasa then widespread in Syria and its vicinity. They were endowed institutions, generally quite small, which housed a small number of students, typically less than two dozen."

The founding text of the college:

We, Barbedor, dean of the church in Paris ... want it to be known to all, both present and future, that when Sir Josse of London returned from Jerusalem, having considered with the most careful devotion the assistance which is given to the poor and the sick in the hospital of Notre Dame (Blessed Mary) of Paris, he saw there a room in which, according to old custom, the poor clerics were lodged and, on our advice and that from Master Hilduin, Chancellor of Paris, then attorney of the same place, he acquired it in perpetuity for the price of 52 livres from the attorneys of the same house for the use of the said clerics, under the condition that the attorneys ... would provide 18 school children with suitable beds on a perpetual basis and each month twelve denarii taken from the alms which are collected in the safe.

The college was closed during the reconstruction of the University in the 17th century.

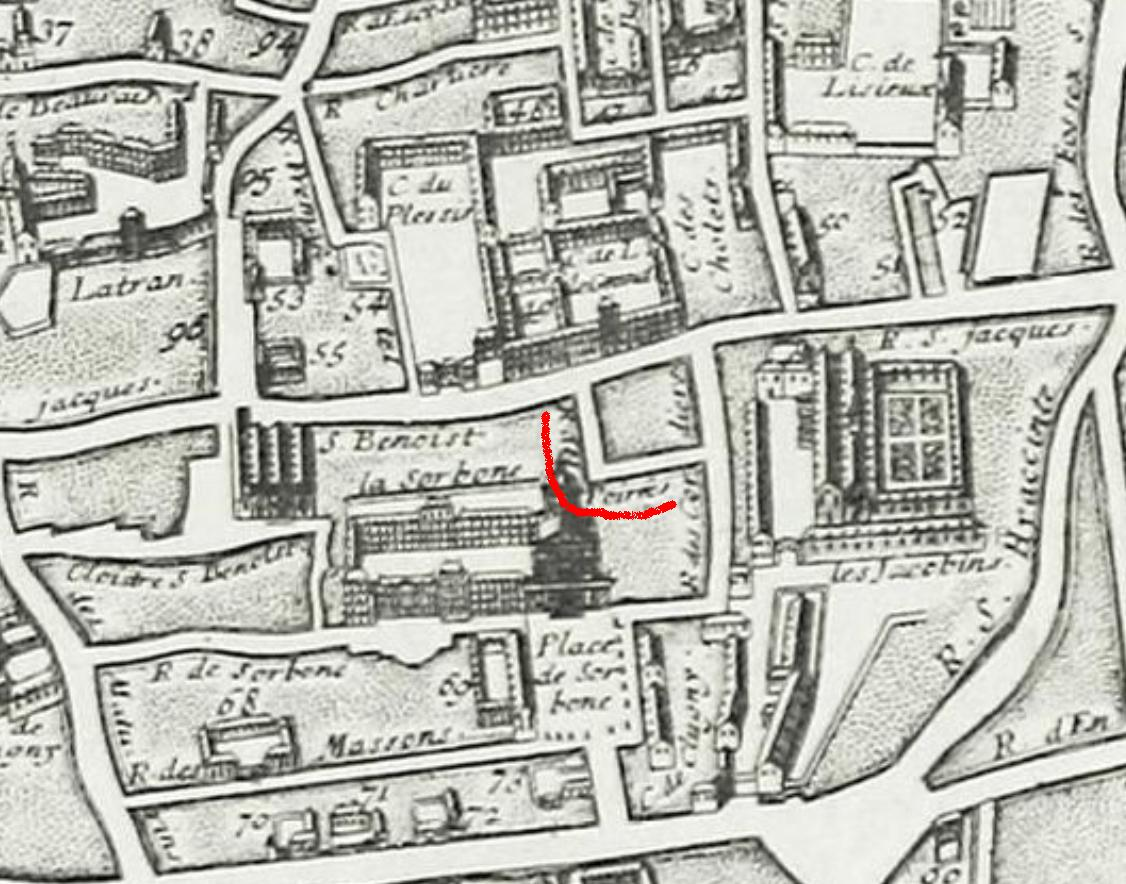
1713 Jaillot's map showing the rue des Poirées.
