= Lucien Abenhaim =

French physician

Lucien Abenhaim is a scientific entrepreneur. He has created several academic research groups and Medtechs, including [RE]MEDs, specialised in the repurposing of medicines. He was a member of the executive committee of the World Health Organization (WHO).

== Personal life ==
Abenhaim was born in 1951 in Casablanca (Morocco) to a Jewish family which moved to France and later to Canada. Abenhaim has a son, Félix LaHaye, a Los Angeles esports entrepreneur who made it to the INC and Forbes 30 Under 30 lists in 2016 and 2017 respectively.

== Education ==
Abenhaim was trained in medicine (MD from University of Paris in 1977 and MSc in Experimental medicine from McGill University in 1980), and information sciences (science doctorate from the Ecole des Hautes Etudes en Sciences Sociales in 1986).

== Academic research ==
Abenhaim worked in academic research in Canada and France, including positions at the University of Montreal, McGill University, and the French National Institute of Health and Medical Research (INSERM). His work focused on epidemiology and public health.

== MedTechs ==
Abenhaim founded several successful research companies focusing on innovative methodologies to assess drug effects in real life settings:

(i) The centre for risk research inc. (CRRx), a Canadian company. With the cooperation of Drs. Lamiae Grimaldi and Michel Rossignol, Abenhaim developed the widely subscribed PGRxTM information system, which was used in landmark studies such as the International study on Insulin and Cancer[6] and for the surveillance of new vaccines.

(ii) LA-SER, an international company active in over 20 countries, where he conducted so-called post-authorisation safety studies (PASS) or post-authorisation efficacy studies (PAES), the first Performance Agreement studies between pharma and payers.

(iii) Analytica-Laser, a spin-off of LA-SER, focusing on real world evidence for Health Technology Assessment (HTA) of pharmaceuticals.

(iv) In 2020, Abenhaim founded [RE]MEDs, a MedTech star-up which focuses on the use of big data, pharmacoepidemiology and Artificial Intelligence to identify unsuspected effects of drugs, including those useful for the repurposing of medications.

== Teaching ==
Abenhaim was an associate professor at the Faculty of Arts and Sciences at the University of Montreal from 1984 to 1987. He then became a professor of Epidemiology and Biostatistics at McGill University (1988–2005). There, he co-founded and directed the McGill University Pharmacoepidemiology Education program (1988–2005), the first graduate teaching programme in this new discipline to exist worldwide. He was also a visiting professor at the University of Bordeaux (1998–1999), and a professor of Public Health at the University René Descartes in Paris (2004–2007). Since 2005 he is an Honorary Professor of Epidemiology at the London School of Hygiene and Tropical Medicine (London).

== Public health service ==
Abenhaim served as the General Director of Health (equivalent to Chief Medical Officer) of France (1999–2003), and as a member of the General Assembly and of the executive committee of the WHO (2001–2003).

== Whistle blowing on 'Fen-Phen' ==
Abenhaim blew the whistle internationally on fenfluramine, an appetite suppressant developed by the French Laboratory Servier and commercialised by American Home Products in the US under the name Redux. Fenfluramine was the main toxic component of the so-called ‘fen-phen’ combination. He led the renowned International Primary Pulmonary Hypertension Study (IPPHS), which was published in the prestigious New England Journal of Medicine in 1996, and which showed that fenfluramine had a causal role in primary pulmonary hypertension, a fatal condition at the time. The study had been sponsored by Servier, who turned against it after its results were published. Abenhaim publicly opposed the USFDA's decision to authorise the commercialisation of ‘Redux®’, which was eventually banned in 1997 after it was shown that it caused an additional heart problem. Over 20 billion dollars in compensation were paid by pharmaceutical companies to the victims of Redux and other fenfluramine derivatives.

Abenhaim received the Radio-Canada Scientist of the Year award in 1997 for his work on appetite suppressants and the widespread communication of their risks to the public.

In 2021 and 2023, Abenhaim testified in French courts against Servier Laboratories, which despite the 1997 international ban had continued to produce a fenfluramine derivative marketed until 2010 under the name ‘Mediator®’. Servier was ordered to pay over half a billion euros and one executive received a jail sentence. Jacques Servier was also prosecuted but passed away before the trial.

== Scientific information ==
Abenhaim has been involved in science communication. He was a journalist for medical newspapers (and an editor of medical reviews). He created the Scientific Information Service of the Quebec OH&S research institute (IRSST). And, he conceived and co-produced with Pierre H. Tremblay and Pixcom the 13-episode television series “The Great Fears of Year 2000,” broadcast on primetime television in Quebec (TVA) in 2000. The show presciently warned about the high likelihood of a viral pandemic, and the consequences of climate change on water supplies, among other threats.

From 2010 to 2019, he sponsored and co-chaired a regular Symposium on the Access to Innovative Medicines organised at the London School of Hygiene and Tropical Medicine.

== Philanthropy ==
Since 1997, Abenhaim sponsors an annual fellowship – now the Prix Louise-LaHaye in memory of his late wife – which is awarded by the Quebec Center for Drama Writers (CEAD) to an original play for a younger audience.
