= François Loeser =

French mathematician (born 1958)

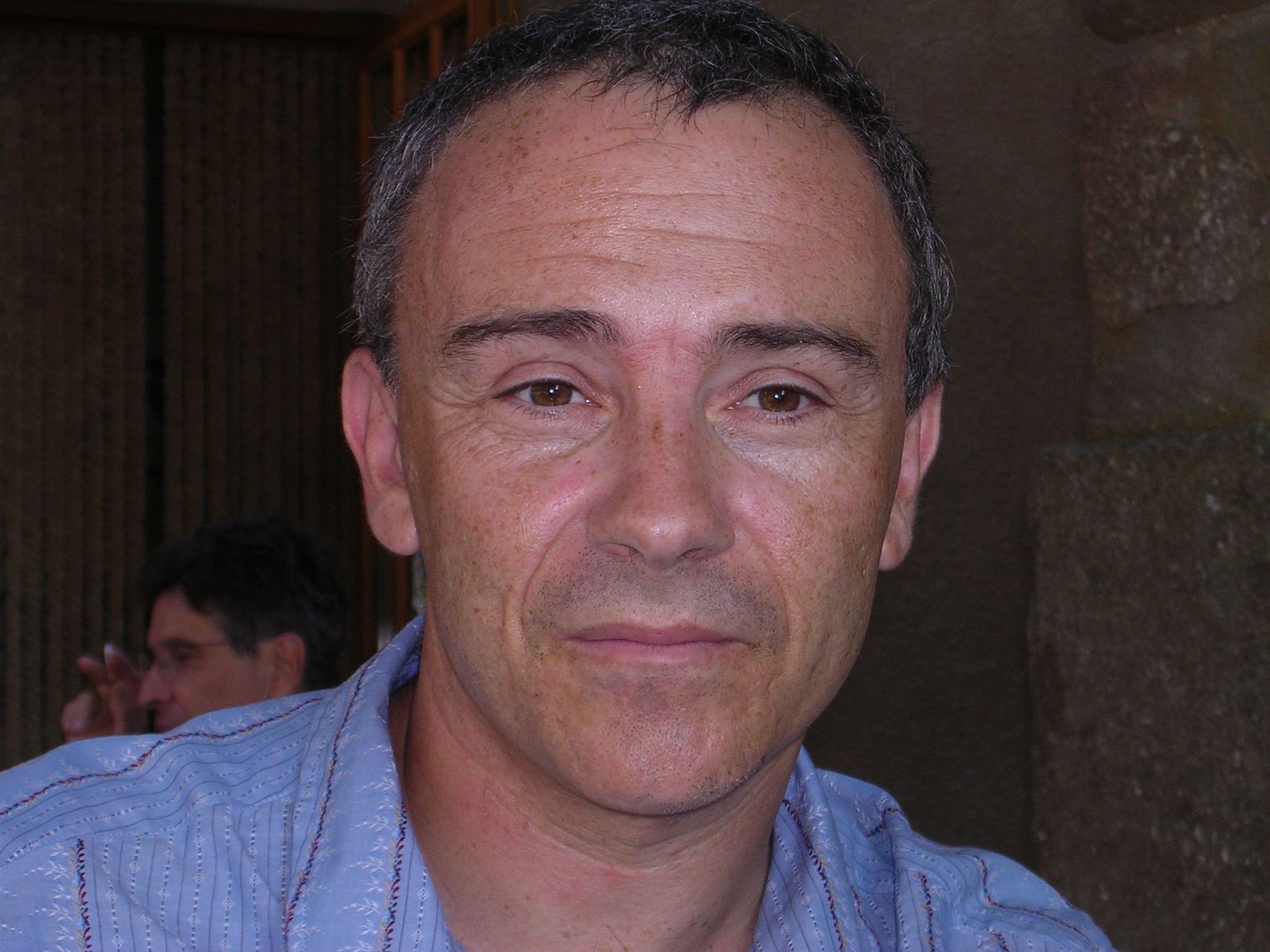
- Born: 25 August 1958 (age 68); Mulhouse
- Education: École Normale Supérieure
- Known for: Motivic Integration
- Awards: Charles-Louis de Saulces de Freycinet Prize (2007); CNRS Silver Medal (2011)
- Scientific career
- Fields: Mathematics
- Workplaces: Pierre-and-Marie-Curie University; Ecole Normale Supérieure
- Doctoral advisor: Bernard Teissier

François Loeser (born August 25, 1958) is a French mathematician. He is Professor of Mathematics at the Pierre-and-Marie-Curie University in Paris. From 2000 to 2010 he was Professor at École Normale Supérieure. Since 2015, he is a senior member of the Institut Universitaire de France.

He was awarded the CNRS Silver Medal in 2011 and the Charles-Louis de Saulces de Freycinet Prize of the French Academy of Sciences in 2007. He was awarded an ERC Advanced Investigator Grant in 2010 and has been a Plenary Speaker at the European Congress of Mathematics in Amsterdam in 2008. In 2014 Loeser was an Invited Speaker at the International Congresses of Mathematicians in Seoul. In 2015 he was elected as a fellow of the American Mathematical Society "for contributions to algebraic and arithmetic geometry and to model theory". He was elected member of Academia Europaea in 2019. In 2025-26, he was awarded the Jacques Tits Chair founded by the Belgian Mathematical Society.

He is a specialist of algebraic geometry and is best known for his work on motivic integration, part of it in collaboration with Jan Denef.

== Publications ==
- Denef, Jan; Loeser, François (1998). "Motivic Igusa zeta functions". Journal of Algebraic Geometry. 7 (3): 505–537. MR 1618144.
- Denef, Jan; Loeser, François (1999). "Germs of arcs on singular algebraic varieties and motivic integration". Inventiones Mathematicae. 135 (1): 201–232. arXiv:math/9803039. Bibcode:1999InMat.135..201D. doi:10.1007/s002220050284. MR 1664700. S2CID 13374510.
