= Motivic integration =

Notion in algebraic geometry

Motivic integration is a notion in algebraic geometry that was introduced by Maxim Kontsevich in 1995 and was developed by Jan Denef and François Loeser. Since its introduction it has proved to be very useful in various branches of algebraic geometry, most notably birational geometry and singularity theory. Roughly speaking, motivic integration assigns to subsets of the arc space of an algebraic variety, a volume living in the Grothendieck ring of algebraic varieties. The naming 'motivic' mirrors the fact that unlike ordinary integration, for which the values are real numbers, in motivic integration the values are geometric in nature.
