= Anatole Félix Le Double =

French anatomist (1848-1913)

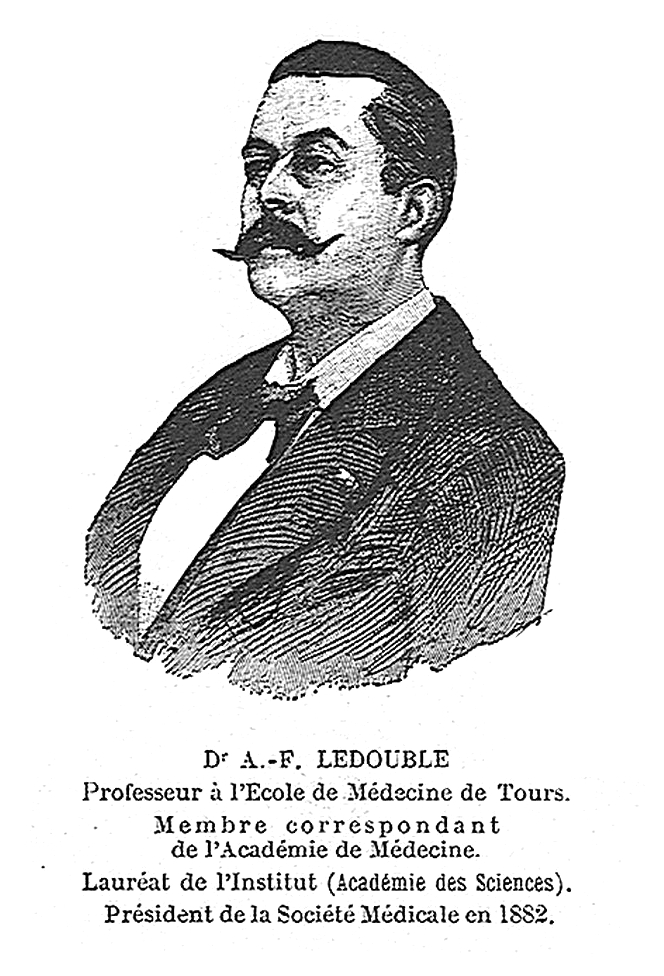

Félix Odoart Anatole Pierre Xavier Le Double (14 August, 1848 – 22 October, 1913) was a French anatomist and physician. He studied and taught comparative anatomy and took a special interest in anthropology and the differences in anatomy, and took an evolutionary view on these variations.

Le Double was born in Rocroi, Ardennes, where his father was the owner of the insurance company Compagnie du Soleil. He studied at the lycaeum in Honfleur where his family had moved to, and then went to study medicine in Paris. He graduated with medals and honours and served in the Franco-Prussian War. He then worked in Paris and submitted a thesis on occlusion caused by urogenital fistulas in 1876. He became a surgeon at the Hospice Général of Tours, and then a professor of the medical faculty of Tours.

Le Double took a special interest in comparative anatomy and in anthropology. He took a special interest in anatomical variations within humans. He was one of the first French researchers to promote the field of paleopathology.

Le Double wrote treatises on human musculature and anthropology. He also examined Rabelais as an anatomist. Le Double died of accidental carbon monoxide poisoning at home in Tours in 1913.
