= Jan Denef =

Belgian mathematician

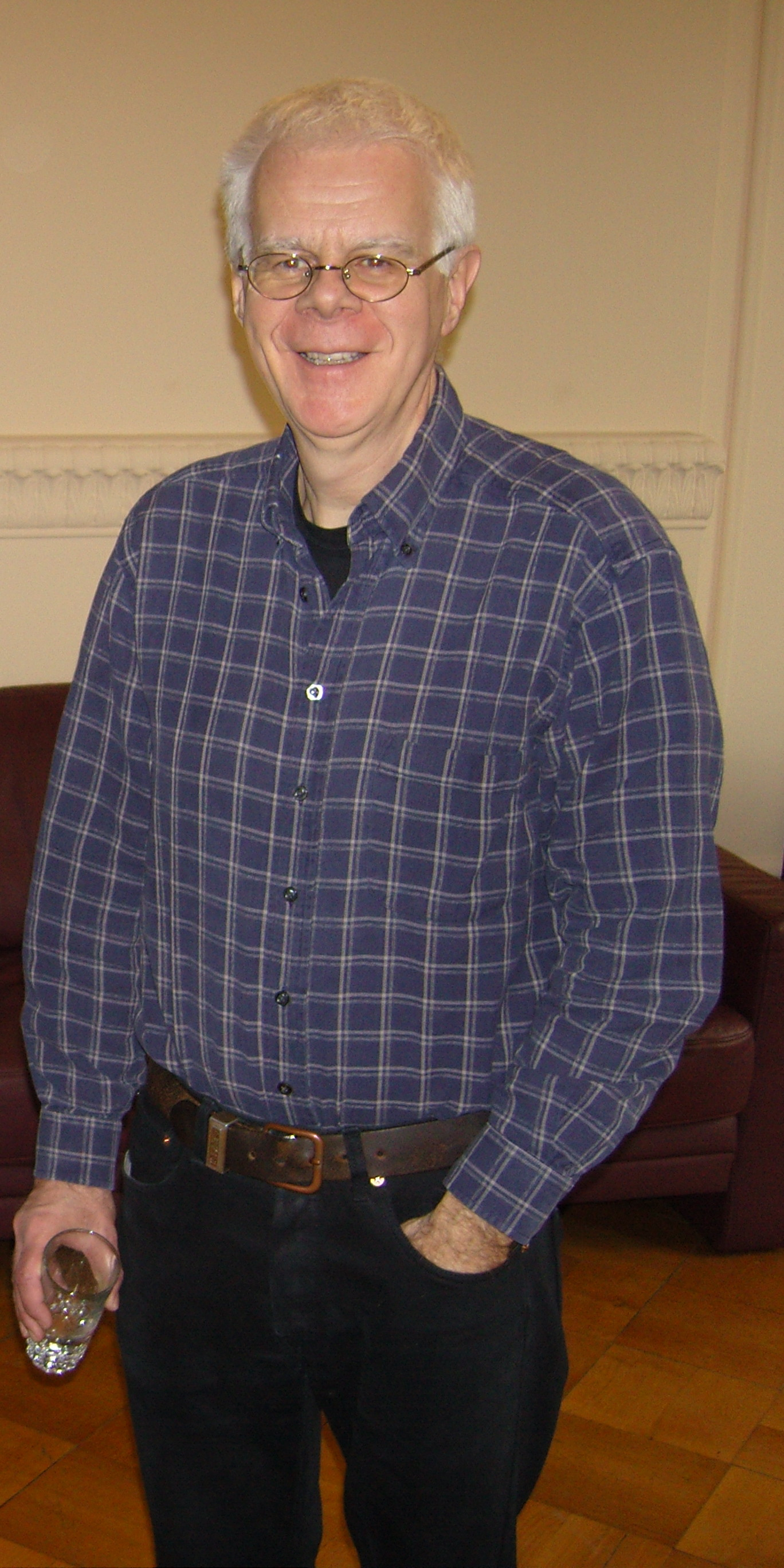
Jan Denef

Jan Denef (born 4 September 1951) is a Belgian mathematician. He is an Emeritus Professor of Mathematics at the Katholieke Universiteit Leuven (KU Leuven).

Denef obtained his PhD from KU Leuven in 1975 with a thesis on Hilbert's tenth problem; his advisors were Louis Philippe Bouckaert and Willem Kuijk.

He is a specialist of model theory, number theory and algebraic geometry. He is well known for his early work on Hilbert's tenth problem and for developing the theory of motivic integration in a series of papers with François Loeser. He has also worked on computational number theory.

Recently he proved a conjecture of Jean-Louis Colliot-Thélène which generalizes the Ax–Kochen theorem.

In 2002 Denef was an Invited Speaker at the International Congresses of Mathematicians in Beijing. His Hirsch-index is 24.

== Publications ==
- Denef, Jan; Loeser, François (1998). "Motivic Igusa zeta functions". Journal of Algebraic Geometry. 7 (3): 505–537. MR 1618144.
- Denef, Jan; Loeser, François (1999). "Germs of arcs on singular algebraic varieties and motivic integration". Inventiones Mathematicae. 135 (1): 201–232. arXiv:math/9803039. Bibcode:1999InMat.135..201D. doi:10.1007/s002220050284. MR 1664700. S2CID 13374510.
