= List of nominees for the Nobel Prize in Physics =

Chien-Shiung Wu, the first woman from Asia to be nominated for the Nobel Prize in Physics

The Nobel Prize in Physics (Swedish: Nobelpriset i fysik) is awarded annually by the Royal Swedish Academy of Sciences to scientists who have made outstanding contributions in Physics. It is one of the five Nobel Prizes which were established by the will of Alfred Nobel in 1895.

Every year, the Royal Swedish Academy of Sciences sends out forms, which amount to a personal and exclusive invitation, to about three thousand selected individuals to invite them to submit nominations. The names of the nominees are never publicly announced, and neither are they told that they have been considered for the Prize. Nomination records are strictly sealed for fifty years. As of 2026, the nominations for the years 1901 to 1975 are publicly available. Despite the annual sending of invitations, the prize was not awarded in six years (1916, 1931, 1934, 1940–1942) and have been delayed for a year nine times (1914, 1917, 1918, 1921, 1924, 1925, 1928, 1932, 1943).

From 1901 to 1974, 672 scientists were nominated for the prize, 100 of which were awarded either jointly or individually. 30 more scientists from these nominees were awarded after 1974. Of the 13 women nominees, only two were awarded the prize in physics. The first woman to be nominated was Marie Curie in 1902 by German scientist Emil Warburg and French mathematician Gaston Darboux, and she won the prize the next year. She is the only woman to win a Nobel Prize twice: Physics (1903) and Chemistry (1911). Besides 27 and 3 scientists from these nominees won the prizes in Chemistry (including two more women) and in Physiology or Medicine correspondingly (including years after 1974). Only one informal corporation - the Nuclear scientists (1946 and 1947) and three organizations: CERN (1970 and 1975), Brookhaven National Laboratory(1975) and SLAC National Accelerator Laboratory (1975) have been nominated.

Despite the long list of nominated noteworthy physicists, astronomers, engineers, and chemists, there have been other famed scientists who were overlooked for the prize in physics, such as physicists G.Fr.FitzGerald, G.Stokes, J.W.Gibbs, P.Drude, H.Minkowski, W.Ritz, G.J.Stoney, Osb.Reynolds, Fr.C.Alw.Pockels, V.Schumann, N.Umov, Ernst Pringsheim Sr., M.Smoluchowski, W.Voigt, M.Abraham, Al.Friedmann, G.Wulff, Ant. van den Broek, F.Kurlbaum, G.Sagnac, Em.Wiechert, R.Pictet, P.Ehrenfest, P.Knipping, L.Shubnikov, M.P.Bronstein, Ett.Majorana, Edw.Hall, S.P.Schubin, D.S.Roschdestwenski, Ol.Lodge, J.Larmor, J.Ishiwara, N.Dm.Papaleksi, R.Ch.Tolman, A.H.Pfund, W. W. Hansen, H.Nagaoka, Y.Nishina, Ya.Frenkel, Th.Kaluza, J.Lennard-Jones, H.Weyl, Al.Proca, J. von Neumann, G.Mie, D.Hartree, Ad.Smekal, P. Pringsheim, H. von Halban, Fr.Houtermans, B.Podolsky, A.I.Alikhanov, Ern.Marsden and E.F.Gross; astronomers and astrophysicists: Ot.W.v.Struve and his grandson Otto Struve, P.J.C.Janssen, Ch.Aug.Young, S.Newcomb, G.V.Schiaparelli, W. Huggins, K.Schwarzschild, P.Lowell, W.de Sitter, brothers Edw.Ch. and W.H.Pickering, R.H.Fowler, G.W.Ritchey, J.Jeans, Gr.Shajn, Otto Schmidt, G.Adr.Tikhov, C.K.Seyfert and Dm.Dm.Maksutov; inventors and engineers: Al.St.Popov, B.Rosing, G.B.Pegram, Ig.Kurchatov and S.Korolev.

In addition, nominations of 10 scientists and two corporations more were declared invalid by the Nobel Committee.

== Nominees by their first nomination ==
=== 1901–1909 ===
Picture	Name	Born	Died	Years Nominated	Notes
1901
	Wilhelm Röntgen	March 27, 1845; Lennep, German Confederation	February 10, 1923; Munich, Germany	1901	Won the 1901 Nobel Prize in Physics “in recognition of the extraordinary services he has rendered by the discovery of the remarkable rays subsequently named after him” and nominated later for the Nobel Prize in Physiology or Medicine too (Note: "The work done is in the physical field but among the latest discoveries, Röntgen's has been of greatest use in medicine")
	Henri Becquerel	December 15, 1852; Paris, France	August 25, 1908; Le Croisic, France	1901, 1902, 1903	Shared the 1903 Nobel Prize in Physics “in recognition of the extraordinary services he has rendered by his discovery of spontaneous radioactivity” with P. and M.Curie
	Philipp Lenard	June 7, 1862; Preßburg, Austria	May 20, 1947; Messelhausen, Germany	1901, 1902, 1903, 1904, 1905, 1924, 1925	Won the 1905 Nobel Prize in Physics “for his work on cathode rays”
	Gabriel Lippmann	August 16, 1845; Bonnevoie, German Confederation	July 13, 1921; SS France, Atlantic Ocean	1901, 1903, 1904, 1905, 1906, 1907, 1908	Won the 1908 Nobel Prize in Physics “for his method of reproducing colours photographically based on the phenomenon of interference”
	Guglielmo Marconi	April 25, 1874; Bologna, Kingdom of Italy	July 20, 1937; Rome, Kingdom of Italy	1901, 1902, 1903, 1908, 1909, 1929, 1933	Shared the 1909 Nobel Prize in Physics with K.F.Braun (Note: “in recognition of their contributions to the development of wireless telegraphy”)
	Johannes Diderik van der Waals	November 23, 1837; Leiden, Netherlands	March 8, 1923; Amsterdam, Netherlands	1901, 1907, 1909, 1910	Won the 1910 Nobel Prize in Physics “for his work on the equation of state for gases and liquids”
	Svante Arrhenius	February 19, 1859; Vik Castle, Sweden	October 2, 1927; Stockholm, Sweden	1901, 1902, 1903	Won the 1903 Nobel Prize in Chemistry and nominated for the Nobel Prize in Physiology or Medicine too (Note: "Work on immunochemistry")
	William Wallace Campbell	April 11, 1862; Hancock County, Ohio, United States	June 14, 1938; San Francisco, United States	1901	
	Adolf Erik Nordenskiöld	November 18, 1832; Helsingfors, Grand Duchy of Finland	August 12, 1901; Dalbyö, Sweden	1901	Nominated the only time by El. Sidenbladh. Died before the only chance to be rewarded
	Henry Augustus Rowland	November 27, 1848; Honesdale, Pennsylvania, United States	April 16, 1901; Baltimore, United States	1901 (Note: Nominations were declared invalid by the Nobel Committee – The Nobel Population 1901–1937: A Census of the Nominators and Nominees for the Prizes in Physics and Chemistry Elisabeth T. Crawford, J. L. Heilbron, Rebecca Ullrich (Office for History of Science and Technology, University of California, 1987))	H.Aug.Rowland died before the only chance to be rewarded Self-nominations
	Robert Henry Thurston	October 25, 1839; Providence, Rhode Island, United States	October 25, 1903; Ithaca, New York, United States	1901	H.Aug.Rowland died before the only chance to be rewarded Self-nominations
	William Thomson, 1st Baron Kelvin	June 26, 1824; Belfast, United Kingdom of Great Britain and Ireland	December 17, 1907; Largs, United Kingdom	1901, 1902, 1903, 1906, 1907	
	Pieter Zeeman	May 25, 1865; Zonnemaire, Netherlands	October 9, 1943; Amsterdam, Netherlands	1901, 1902	Shared the 1902 Nobel Prize in Physics “in recognition of the extraordinary service they rendered by their researches into the influence of magnetism upon radiation phenomena”
1902					Shared the 1902 Nobel Prize in Physics “in recognition of the extraordinary service they rendered by their researches into the influence of magnetism upon radiation phenomena”
	Hendrik Lorentz	July 18, 1853; Arnhem, Netherlands	February 4, 1928; Haarlem, Netherlands	1902, 1912, 1913, 1918, 1919, 1923	Shared the 1902 Nobel Prize in Physics “in recognition of the extraordinary service they rendered by their researches into the influence of magnetism upon radiation phenomena”
	Pierre Curie	May 15, 1859; Paris, France	April 19, 1906; Paris, France	1902, 1903	Shared the 1903 Nobel Prize in Physics “in recognition of the extraordinary services they have rendered by their joint researches on the radiation phenomena discovered by Professor Henri Becquerel” with H.Becquerel M.Curie won the 1911 Nobel Prize in Chemistry too
	Marie Curie	November 7, 1867; Warsaw, Congress of Poland	July 4, 1934; Passy, Haute-Savoie, France	1902, 1903	Shared the 1903 Nobel Prize in Physics “in recognition of the extraordinary services they have rendered by their joint researches on the radiation phenomena discovered by Professor Henri Becquerel” with H.Becquerel M.Curie won the 1911 Nobel Prize in Chemistry too
	John William Strutt, 3rd Baron Rayleigh	November 12, 1842; Langford Grove, Maldon, United Kingdom	June 30, 1919; Terling Place, Witham, England	1902, 1903, 1904, 1905	Won the 1904 Nobel Prize in Physics “for his investigations of the densities of the most important gases and for his discovery of argon in connection with these studies”
	J. J. Thomson	December 18, 1856; Cheetham, United Kingdom	August 30, 1940; Cambridge, England	1902, 1904, 1905, 1906, 1907, 1912	Won the 1906 Nobel Prize in Physics “in recognition of the great merits of his theoretical and experimental investigations on the conduction of electricity by gases”
	Charles Édouard Guillaume	February 15, 1861; Fleurier, Switzerland	May 13, 1938; Sèvres, France	1902, 1903, 1904, 1908, 1910, 1912, 1913, 1914, 1920	Won the 1920 Nobel Prize in Physics “in recognition of the service he has rendered to precision measurements in Physics by his discovery of anomalies in nickel steel alloys”
	Pierre Chappuis	Oktober 9, 1855; Bremblens, Switzerland	February 15, 1916; Basel, Switzerland	1902, 1903, 1904	Nominated jointly with Ch.Éd.Guillaume and J.-M.-R.Benoît only by P.Kr.Prytz.
	Justin-Mirande René Benoit	November 28, 1844; Montpellier, France	May 4, 1922; Dijon, France	1902, 1903, 1904, 1908, 1910, 1912, 1913, 1914, 1916	
	John Kerr	December 17, 1824; Ardrossan, United Kingdom	August 15, 1907; Glasgow, Scotland	1902, 1903	
	Johann Wilhelm Hittorf	March 27, 1824; Bonn, German Confederation	November 28, 1914; Münster, German Empire	1902, 1903, 1904	
1903
	Gustave Le Bon	May 7, 1841; Nogent-le-Rotrou, France	December 13, 1931; Marnes-la-Coquette, France	1903	Nominated the only time by Belgian physicist Pierre De Heen (1851–1915).
	Ludwig Boltzmann	February 20, 1844; Vienna, Austria	September 5, 1906; Tybein, Austria-Hungary	1903, 1905, 1906	
1904
	Albert A. Michelson	December 19, 1852; Strzelno, Congress of Poland	May 9, 1931; Pasadena, California, United States	1904, 1907	Won the 1907 Nobel Prize in Physics “for his optical precision instruments and the spectroscopic and metrological investigations carried out with their aid”
	William Ramsay	October 2, 1852; Glasgow, United Kingdom	July 23, 1916; High Wycombe, United Kingdom	1904, 1905	Won the 1904 Nobel Prize in Chemistry
	Walter Kaufmann	June 5, 1871; Elberfeld, German Empire	January 1, 1947; Freiburg im Breisgau, Germany	1904	Nominated jointly with J. J. Thomson, J.Dewar and K.Olszewski the only time by N.Umov.
	Ernst Abbe	January 23, 1840; Eisenach, German Confederation	January 14, 1905; Jena, German Empire	1904, 1905	Nominated for the Nobel Prize in Physiology or Medicine too (Note: "Work on the perfection of the microscope and work on social hygiene")
	Édouard Branly	November 23, 1844; Amiens, France	March 24, 1940; Paris, France	1904, 1909	Nominated for the Nobel Prize in Chemistry too.
	Friedrich Kohlrausch	October 14, 1840; Rinteln, German Confederation	January 17, 1910; Marburg, German Empire	1904, 1905, 1906, 1907, 1908, 1909	
	Julius Elster	December 24, 1854; Blankenburg (Harz), German Confederation	April 6, 1920; Bad Harzburg, Germany	1904, 1905, 1907, 1908, 1909, 1910, 1911	Only nominated jointly
	Hans Friedrich Geitel	July 16, 1855; Braunschweig, German Confederation	August 15, 1923; Wolfenbüttel, Germany	1904, 1905, 1907, 1908, 1909, 1910, 1911	Only nominated jointly
	Henri Poincaré	April 29, 1854; Nancy, France	July 17, 1912; Paris, France	1904, 1906, 1907, 1909, 1910, 1911, 1912	
	James Dewar	September 20, 1842; Kincardine, Fife, United Kingdom	March 27, 1923; London, United Kingdom	1904, 1905, 1912, 1913	Nominated for the Nobel Prize in Chemistry too.
	Karol Olszewski	January 29, 1846; Broniszów, Podkarpackie Voivodeship, now Poland	March 24, 1915; Kraków, now Poland	1904, 1913	Nominated for the Nobel Prize in Chemistry too.
	Oliver Heaviside	May 18, 1850; Camden Town, United Kingdom	February 3, 1925; Torquay, England	1904, 1905, 1907, 1909, 1911, 1912, 1914	Nominated by V.Bjerknes only.
	Arthur Schuster	September 12, 1851; Frankfurt am Main, German Confederation	October 14, 1934; Yeldall Manor, Berkshire, United Kingdom	1904, 1914, 1917, 1925	
1905
	Karl Ferdinand Braun	June 6, 1850; Fulda, German Confederation	April 20, 1918; Brooklyn, New York, United States	1905, 1906, 1907, 1909	Shared the 1909 Nobel Prize in Physics with G.Marconi
	Prosper-René Blondlot	July 3, 1849; Nancy, France	November 24, 1930; Nancy, France	1905	Nominated the only time by Ch.J.Bouchard.
	Pyotr Lebedev	February 24, 1866; Moscow, Russian Empire	March 1, 1912; Moscow, Russian Empire	1905, 1912	
	Heinrich Kayser	March 16, 1853; Bingen am Rhein, German Confederation	October 14, 1940; Bonn, Germany	1905, 1916, 1917	
	Augusto Righi	August 27, 1850; Bologna, Papal States	June 8, 1920; Bologna, Kingdom of Italy	1905, 1906, 1907, 1908, 1909, 1910, 1911, 1912, 1913, 1914, 1915, 1916, 1917, 1918, 1919, 1920	
1906
	Julius von Hann	March 23, 1839; Wartberg ob der Aist, Austria	October 1, 1921; Vienna, Austria	1906, 1911, 1913	
1907
	Wilhelm Wien	January 13, 1864; Gaffken near Fischhausen, German Confederation	August 30, 1928; Munich, Germany	1907, 1908, 1909, 1910, 1911, 1926, 1927, 1929	Won the 1911 Nobel Prize in Physics “for his discoveries regarding the laws governing the radiation of heat”
	Max Planck	April 23, 1858; Kiel, German Confederation	October 4, 1947; Göttingen, Germany	1907, 1908, 1909, 1910, 1911, 1912, 1913, 1914, 1915, 1916, 1917, 1918, 1919, 1920	Won the 1918 Nobel Prize in Physics in 1919 “in recognition of the services he rendered to the advancement of Physics by his discovery of energy quanta”
	Ernest Rutherford	August 30, 1871; Brightwater, British Empire	October 19, 1937; Cambridge, United Kingdom	1907, 1908, 1909, 1922, 1923, 1924, 1931, 1932, 1933, 1935, 1937	Won the 1908 Nobel Prize in Chemistry.
	Ernst Bessel Hagen	January 31, 1851; Königsberg, Kingdom of Prussia	January 15, 1923; Munich, Germany	1907	Nominated jointly with H.Rubens the only time by G.H.Quincke.
	Heinrich Rubens	March 30, 1865; Wiesbaden, German Confederation	July 17, 1922; Berlin, Germany	1907, 1909	
	Pierre Duhem	June 9, 1861; Paris, France	September 14, 1916; Cabrespine, France	1907, 1916	
	William Crookes	June 17, 1832; London, United Kingdom	April 4, 1919; London, England	1907, 1910, 1911, 1914, 1918	Nominated for the Nobel Prize in Chemistry too.
1908
	Gustaf de Laval	May 9, 1845; Orsa Municipality, Sweden	February 2, 1913; Stockholm, Sweden	1908	Nominated for the Nobel Prize in Chemistry too by Sven Otto Pettersson only
	Joseph Norman Lockyer	May 17, 1836; Rugby, Warwickshire, United Kingdom	August 16, 1920; Salcombe Regis, England	1908, 1909	
	Émile Amagat	January 2, 1841; Saint-Satur, France	February 15, 1915; Saint-Satur, France	1908, 1913, 1914	
1909
	Heike Kamerlingh Onnes	September 21, 1853; Groningen, Netherlands	February 21, 1926; Leiden, Netherlands	1909, 1910, 1912, 1913, 1914	Won the 1913 Nobel Prize in Physics “for his investigations on the properties of matter at low temperatures which led, inter alia, to the production of liquid helium” and nominated for the Nobel Prize in Chemistry too.
	Henri Farman	May 26, 1874; Paris, France	July 17, 1958; Paris, France	1909	Nominated jointly with brothers Wright only
	Gabriel Voisin	February 5, 1880; Belleville, France	December 25, 1973; Ozenay, France	1909	Nominated jointly with brothers Wright only
	Orville Wright	August 19, 1871; Dayton, United States	January 30, 1948; Dayton, United States	1909, 1913	Only nominated jointly
	Wilbur Wright	April 16, 1867; Millville, United States	May 30, 1912; Dayton, United States	1909, 1913	Only nominated jointly
	John Henry Poynting	September 9, 1852; Monton, United Kingdom	March 30, 1914; Birmingham, England	1909, 1911, 1912	
	Valdemar Poulsen	November 23, 1869; Copenhagen, Denmark	July 23, 1942; Gentofte, Denmark	1909, 1916, 1917, 1918, 1919, 1920, 1921, 1922, 1923	
	George Ellery Hale	June 29, 1868; Chicago, United States	February 21, 1938; Pasadena, United States	1909, 1913, 1914, 1915, 1916, 1917, 1922, 1923, 1924, 1925, 1934	

=== 1910–1919 ===
Picture	Name	Born	Died	Years Nominated	Notes
1910
	Albert Einstein	March 14, 1879; Ulm, German Empire	April 18, 1955; Princeton, New Jersey, United States	1910, 1912, 1913, 1914, 1916, 1917, 1918, 1919, 1920, 1921, 1922, 1923	Won the 1921 Nobel Prize in Physics in 1922 (Note: “for his services to Theoretical Physics, and especially for his discovery of the law of the photoelectric effect”)
	Allvar Gullstrand	June 5, 1862; Landskrona, Sweden	July 28, 1930; Stockholm, Sweden	1910, 1911, 1912	Won the 1911 Nobel Prize in Physiology or Medicine.
	Knut Ångström	January 12, 1857; Uppsala parish, Sweden	March 4, 1910; Uppsala parish, Sweden	1910	Nominated the only time by W.Röntgen. Died before the only chance to be rewarded.
	Otto Lummer	July 17, 1860; Gera, German Confederation	July 5, 1925; Breslau, now Poland	1910, 1911	Nominated jointly with W.Wien and M.Planck by Em.Warburg only.
	Henri Abraham	July 12, 1868; Paris, France	December 22, 1943; Oświęcim, now Poland	1910, 1916	
	Paul Langevin	January 23, 1872; Paris, France	December 19, 1946; Paris, France	1910, 1916, 1921, 1922, 1925, 1927, 1928, 1929, 1930, 1931, 1932, 1933, 1934, 1935, 1937, 1946	
1911
	Walther Nernst	June 25, 1864; Briesen, now Poland	November 18, 1941; Zibelle, now Poland	1911, 1912, 1914, 1915, 1916, 1917, 1921	Won the 1920 Nobel Prize in Chemistry in 1921.
	Ernst Mach	February 18, 1838; Brünn, now Czechia	February 19, 1916; Munich, German Empire	1911, 1912, 1914	
	Loránd Eötvös	July 27, 1848; Buda, Hungary	April 8, 1919; Budapest, Hungary	1911, 1914, 1917, 1923	
	Eugen Goldstein	September 5, 1850; Gleiwitz, now Poland	December 25, 1930; Berlin, Germany	1911, 1913, 1926	
	Charles Fabry	June 11, 1867; Marseille, France	December 11, 1945; Paris, France	1911, 1914, 1916, 1917, 1918, 1922, 1925, 1928, 1932	
1912
	Gustaf Dalén	November 30, 1869; Stenstorp, Sweden	December 9, 1937; Lidingö, Sweden	1912	Won the 1912 Nobel Prize in Physics (Note: “for his invention of automatic regulators for use in conjunction with gas accumulators for illuminating lighthouses and buoys”)
	Robert Hadfield	November 28, 1858; Sheffield, United Kingdom	September 30, 1940; Surrey, England	1912, 1913	
1913
	Jean Baptiste Perrin	September 30, 1870; Lille, France	April 17, 1942; New York City, United States	1913, 1916, 1917, 1918, 1919, 1920, 1921, 1922, 1923, 1924, 1925, 1926	Won the 1926 Nobel Prize in Physics (Note: “for his work on the discontinuous structure of matter, and especially for his discovery of sedimentation equilibrium”) and nominated for the Nobel Prize in Chemistry too.
	Theodor Svedberg	August 30, 1884; Fleräng, Sweden	February 25, 1971; Kopparberg, Sweden	1913, 1919	Won the 1926 Nobel Prize in Chemistry.
	Hermann Frahm	December 8, 1867; Büdelsdorf, North German Confederation	December 28, 1939; Remscheid, Germany	1913	Nominated the only time by Sv.Arrhenius.
	Adolf Slaby	April 18, 1849; Berlin, German Confederation	April 6, 1913; Charlottenburg, German Empire	1913	Nominated the only time by Pehr af Bjerkén. Died before the only chance to be rewarded.
	Ferdinand von Zeppelin	July 8, 1838; Konstanz, German Confederation	March 8, 1917; Berlin, German Empire	1913	Nominated jointly with brothers Wrights the only time by V.Czerny.
	Henry Frederic William Burstall	September 3, 1865; Old Machar, Aberdeenshire, United Kingdom	July 15, 1934; Hopwood, Worcestershire, United Kingdom	1913	Self-nomination
	Hugh Longbourne Callendar	April 18, 1863; Hatherop, United Kingdom	January 21, 1930; Ealing, England	1913, 1918, 1921	
	Otto Lehmann	January 13, 1855; Konstanz, German Confederation	June 17, 1922; Karlsruhe, Germany	1913, 1914, 1915, 1916, 1917, 1918, 1919, 1920, 1921, 1922	Nominated by C.Benedicks only.
	Henri-Alexandre Deslandres	July 24, 1853; Paris, France	January 15, 1948; Paris, France	1913, 1915, 1916, 1923	
	Carl von Linde	June 11, 1842; Berndorf, German Confederation	November 16, 1934; Munich, Germany	1913, 1918, 1926	
1914 – Prize was awarded a year later
	Johannes Stark	April 15, 1874; Schickenhof, German Empire	June 21, 1957; Traunstein, Germany	1914, 1916, 1917, 1918, 1919	Won the 1919 Nobel Prize in Physics (Note: “for his discovery of the Doppler effect in canal rays and the splitting of spectral lines in electric fields”)
	Henry Louis Le Chatelier	October 8, 1850; Paris, France	September 17, 1936; Miribel-les-Échelles, France	1914	Nominated jointly with W.Nernst the only time by Sven Otto Pettersson and for the Nobel Prize in Chemistry too.
	Louis Georges Gouy	February 19, 1854; Vals-les-Bains, France	January 27, 1926; Vals-les-Bains, France	1914, 1916, 1917, 1918, 1919, 1922	
	Friedrich Paschen	January 22, 1865; Schwerin, German Confederation	February 25, 1947; Potsdam, Germany	1914, 1915, 1918, 1919, 1922, 1923, 1924, 1925, 1926, 1927, 1928, 1929, 1930, 1931, 1932, 1933	
	Martin Knudsen	February 15, 1871; Hasmark, Denmark	May 27, 1949; Gentofte, Denmark	1914, 1916, 1917, 1918, 1919, 1920, 1921, 1937	
	Robert W. Wood	May 2, 1868; Concord, Massachusetts, United States	August 11, 1955; Amityville, New York, United States	1914, 1915, 1920, 1924, 1925, 1926, 1927, 1928, 1929, 1930, 1931, 1932, 1933, 1937, 1942, 1950	
	Max von Laue	October 9, 1879; Pfaffendorf, German Empire	April 24, 1960; West Berlin, Germany	1914, 1915	Won the 1914 Nobel Prize in Physics in 1915 (Note: “for his discovery of the diffraction of X-rays by crystals”)
	William Henry Bragg	July 2, 1862; Wigton, United Kingdom	March 12, 1942; London, England	1914, 1915	W.H.Bragg nominated for the Nobel Prize in Chemistry too Shared the 1915 Nobel Prize in Physics (Note: “for their services in the analysis of crystal structure by means of X-rays”).
1915					W.H.Bragg nominated for the Nobel Prize in Chemistry too Shared the 1915 Nobel Prize in Physics.
	Lawrence Bragg	March 31, 1890; Adelaide, Australia	July 1, 1971; Waldringfield, United Kingdom	1915	W.H.Bragg nominated for the Nobel Prize in Chemistry too Shared the 1915 Nobel Prize in Physics.
	Charles Galton Darwin	December 18, 1887; Cambridge, United Kingdom	December 31, 1962; Cambridge, England	1915	Nominated jointly with W.H.Bragg the only time by Sv.Arrhenius and for the Nobel Prize in Chemistry too. Moseley has been killed before the only chance to be rewarded.
	Henry Moseley	November 23, 1887; Weymouth, Dorset, United Kingdom	August 10, 1915; Gallipoli campaign, Turkey	1915	Nominated jointly with W.H.Bragg the only time by Sv.Arrhenius and for the Nobel Prize in Chemistry too. Moseley has been killed before the only chance to be rewarded.
	Charles Thomson Rees Wilson	February 14, 1869; Glencorse, United Kingdom	November 15, 1959; Carlops, Scotland	1915, 1918, 1924, 1925, 1926, 1927	Shared the 1927 Nobel Prize in Physics (Note: “for his method of making the paths of electrically charged particles visible by condensation of vapour”) with A.Compton
	Thomas Edison	February 11, 1847; Milan, Ohio, United States	October 18, 1931; West Orange, New Jersey, United States	1915	Nominated the only time by H.F.Osborn.
	Giacomo Casalis	1869; Italy	after 1931	1915	Nominated jointly the only time by T.Boggio
	Nicola Pavia	1872; Turin, Kingdom of Italy	February 22, 1937; Turin, Kingdom of Italy	1915	Nominated jointly the only time by T.Boggio
	Kristian Birkeland	December 13, 1867; Christiania, Norway	June 15, 1917; Tokyo, Japan	1915, 1916, 1917	Nominated jointly with C.Størmer only and for the Nobel Prize in Chemistry too.
	Carl Størmer	September 3, 1874; Skien, Norway	August 13, 1957; Oslo, Norway	1915, 1916, 1917, 1925, 1927, 1934	
	Aimé Cotton	October 9, 1869; Bourg-en-Bresse, France	April 16, 1951; Sèvres, France	1915, 1916, 1920, 1922, 1925, 1927, 1928, 1929, 1930, 1931, 1932, 1933, 1934, 1944, 1949	
1916 – this year Prize was not awarded
	Henri Mouton	September 5, 1869; Cambrai, France	June 13, 1935; Bezons, France	1916	Nominated jointly with A.Cotton, L.G.Gouy, P.Duhem and Ch.Fabry the only time by M.Brillouin.
	Robert Andrews Millikan	March 22, 1868; Morrison, Illinois, United States	December 19, 1953; San Marino, California, United States	1916, 1918, 1919, 1920, 1921, 1922, 1923, 1924, 1926	Won the 1923 Nobel Prize in Physics (Note: “for his work on the elementary charge of electricity and on the photoelectric effect”)
	Irving Langmuir	January 31, 1881; Brooklyn, New York City, United States	August 16, 1957; Woods Hole, Massachusetts, United States	1916, 1928, 1929, 1933, 1940	Won the 1932 Nobel Prize in Chemistry.
	Peter Debye	March 24, 1884; Maastricht, Netherlands	November 2, 1966; Ithaca, New York, United States	1916, 1917, 1921, 1922, 1924, 1925, 1926, 1927, 1928, 1929, 1930, 1931, 1932, 1933, 1936, 1939	Won the 1936 Nobel Prize in Chemistry.
	Carl Runge	August 30, 1856; Bremen, German Confederation	January 3, 1927; Göttingen, Germany	1916, 1917	Nominated jointly with H.Kayser only.
	Alexandre Dufour	May 8, 1875; Paris, France	June 19, 1942; Paris, France	1916	Nominated jointly with H.Abraham and G.-A.Ferrié the only time by M.Brillouin.
	Gustave-Auguste Ferrié	November 19, 1868; Saint-Michel-de-Maurienne, France	February 16, 1932; Paris, France	1916, 1930, 1931	
	Peder Oluf Pedersen	June 19, 1874; Sig, Denmark	August 30, 1941; Copenhagen, Denmark	1916, 1917, 1918, 1919, 1920, 1921, 1922, 1923	Nominated jointly with V.Poulsen only.
	Pierre Weiss	March 25, 1865; Mulhouse, France	October 24, 1940; Lyon, France	1916, 1921, 1922, 1924, 1925, 1927, 1928, 1929, 1930, 1931, 1932, 1933, 1934, 1936, 1937	
1917 – Prize was awarded a year later
	Niels Bohr	October 7, 1885; Copenhagen, Denmark	November 18, 1962; Copenhagen, Denmark	1917, 1918, 1919, 1920, 1921, 1922, 1923	Won the 1922 Nobel Prize in Physics (Note: “for his services in the investigation of the structure of atoms and of the radiation emanating from them”) and nominated for the Nobel Prize in Chemistry too
	Johannes Rydberg	November 8, 1854; Halmstad, Sweden	December 28, 1919; Lund, Sweden	1917, 1920	
	Arnold Sommerfeld	December 5, 1868; Königsberg, North German Confederation	April 26, 1951; Munich, Germany	1917, 1918, 1919, 1920, 1922, 1923, 1924, 1925, 1926, 1927, 1928, 1929, 1930, 1931, 1932, 1933, 1934, 1935, 1936, 1937, 1940, 1948, 1949, 1950, 1951	
1918 – Prize was awarded a year later
	Charles Glover Barkla	June 7, 1877; Widnes, United Kingdom	October 23, 1944; Edinburgh, United Kingdom	1918, 1919	Won the 1917 Nobel Prize in Physics in 1918 (Note: “for his discovery of the characteristic Röntgen radiation of the elements”)
	Alfred Perot	November 3, 1863; Metz, France	November 28, 1925; Paris, France	1918	Nominated jointly with R.A.Millikan, H.L.Callendar and Th.Lyman IV the only time by H.Crew.
	Fernando Sanford	February 12, 1854; Franklin Grove, Illinois, United States	May 21, 1948; Santa Clara, California, United States	1918, 1919, 1920	Nominated by D.St.Jordan only.
	Theodore Lyman IV	November 23, 1874; Boston, Massachusetts, United States	October 11, 1954; Cambridge, Massachusetts, United States	1918, 1926	Nominated jointly with R.A.Millikan only.
1919
	Percy Williams Bridgman	April 21, 1882; Cambridge, Massachusetts, United States	August 20, 1961; Randolph, New Hampshire, United States	1919, 1924, 1928, 1929, 1933, 1934, 1936, 1939, 1940, 1941, 1942, 1943, 1945, 1946	Won the 1946 Nobel Prize in Physics (Note: “for the invention of an apparatus to produce extremely high pressures, and for the discoveries he made therewith in the field of high pressure physics”) and nominated for the Nobel Prize in Chemistry too.

=== 1920–1930 ===
Picture	Name	Born	Died	Years Nominated	Notes
1920
	Friedrich Wilhelm Ostwald	September 2, 1853; Riga, Russian Empire	April 4, 1932; Großbothen, Germany	1920, 1921, 1923, 1924	Won the 1909 Nobel Prize in Chemistry and self-nominated for the Nobel Prize in Physics
	Walter Sydney Adams	December 20, 1876; Antakya, Turkey	May 11, 1956; Pasadena, California, United States	1920	Nominated the only time by Alfred Fowler.
	Carl Barus	February 19, 1856; Cincinnati, United States	September 20, 1935; Providence, Rhode Island, United States	1920, 1921	
	Louis Lumière	October 5, 1864; Besançon, France	June 6, 1948; Bandol, France	1920, 1921, 1922, 1924, 1927	Nominated jointly with A.Lumière by H.L.Le Chatelier only.
	Auguste Lumière	October 19, 1862; Besançon, France	April 10, 1954; Lyon, France	1920, 1921, 1922, 1924, 1927	Nominated for the Nobel Prize in Physiology or Medicine too (Note: "Work on the colloid state in sickness and in health")
1921 – Prize was awarded a year later
	Ernst Gehrcke	July 1, 1878; Berlin, German Empire	January 25, 1960; Hohen Neuendorf, Germany	1921, 1923, 1924, 1928	
	Abbott Lawrence Rotch	January 6, 1861; Boston, United States	April 7, 1912; Boston, United States	1921	Nominated posthumously with V.Fr.K.Bjerknes and W.N.Shaw by Al.G.McAdie the only time
	Léon Teisserenc de Bort	November 5, 1855; Paris, France	January 2, 1913; Cannes, France	1921	Nominated posthumously with V.Fr.K.Bjerknes and W.N.Shaw by Al.G.McAdie the only time
1922
	Francis William Aston	September 1, 1877; Harborne, United Kingdom	November 20, 1945; Cambridge, England	1922	Won the 1922 Nobel Prize in Chemistry.
	Charles Greeley Abbot	May 31, 1872; Wilton, New Hampshire, United States	December 17, 1973; Riverdale Park, Maryland, United States	1922	Nominated jointly with Fr.W.Aston, R.A.Millikan, W.D.Coolidge and G.Ell.Hale the only time by Ch.D.Walcott.
	Leo Graetz	September 26, 1856; Breslau, now Poland	November 12, 1941; Munich, Germany	1922, 1924	Nominated by G. von Mayr only.
	William D. Coolidge	October 23, 1873; Hudson, Massachusetts, United States	February 3, 1975; Schenectady, New York, United States	1922, 1927, 1935	
1923
	Frederick Soddy	September 2, 1877; Eastbourne, United Kingdom	September 22, 1956; Brighton, England	1923	Won the 1921 Nobel Prize in Chemistry in 1922.
	Kazimierz Fajans	May 27, 1887; Warsaw, Congress of Poland	May 18, 1975; Michigan, United States	1923	Nominated with Fr.Soddy by Em.G.Warburg and for the Nobel Prize in Chemistry too
	Notgemeinschaft der Deutschen Wissenschaft	October 30, 1920		1923	Nominated for the Nobel Prize in Chemistry too by Sv.Aug.Arrhenius only
	Wolfgang Gaede	May 25, 1878; Bremerhaven, German Empire	June 24, 1945; Munich, Germany	1923, 1924, 1925, 1929, 1935, 1936, 1937	
	Vilhelm Bjerknes	March 14, 1862; Christiania, Norway	April 9, 1951; Oslo, Norway	1921, 1923, 1924, 1926, 1929, 1936, 1937, 1938, 1939, 1940, 1942, 1944, 1945	
	James Franck	August 26, 1882; Hamburg, German Empire	May 21, 1964; Göttingen, Germany	1923, 1924, 1925, 1926	Shared the 1925 Nobel Prize in Physics in 1926 (Note: “for their discovery of the laws governing the impact of an electron upon an atom”)
1924 – Prize was awarded a year later					Shared the 1925 Nobel Prize in Physics in 1926
	Gustav Ludwig Hertz	July 22, 1887; Hamburg, German Empire	October 30, 1975; East Berlin, Germany	1924, 1926	Shared the 1925 Nobel Prize in Physics in 1926
	Owen Willans Richardson	April 26, 1879; Dewsbury, United Kingdom	February 15, 1959; Alton, Hampshire, England	1924, 1925, 1926, 1927, 1928, 1929	Won the 1928 Nobel Prize in Physics in 1929 (Note: “for his work on the thermionic phenomenon and especially for the discovery of the law named after him”)
	Jules Richard	1862 (Note: Nevertheless most probable nominee is Jules Richard (1848–1930) – inventor of a few meteorological instruments (including aneroid barograph)); France		1924	Nominated the only time by prominent meteorologist and climatologist Alfred Angot.
	Napier Shaw	March 4, 1854; Birmingham, United Kingdom	March 23, 1945; London, England	1921, 1924, 1927	Nominated by Al.G.McAdie only.
	John Sealy Townsend	June 7, 1868; Galway, United Kingdom of Great Britain and Ireland	February 16, 1957; Oxford, United Kingdom	1924, 1942, 1944	
1925
	Manne Siegbahn	December 3, 1886; Örebro, Sweden	September 26, 1978; Stockholm, Sweden	1923, 1925	Won the 1924 Nobel Prize in Physics in 1925 (Note: “for his discoveries and research in the field of X-ray spectroscopy”)
	Arthur Compton	September 10, 1892; Wooster, Ohio, United States	March 15, 1962; Berkeley, California, United States	1925, 1926, 1927, 1928	Shared the 1927 Nobel Prize in Physics (Note: “for his discovery of the effect named after him”) with Ch.Th.R.Wilson
	Louis de Broglie	August 15, 1892; Dieppe, France	March 19, 1987; Louveciennes, France	1925, 1926, 1928, 1929, 1950	Won the 1929 Nobel Prize in Physics (Note: “for his discovery of the wave nature of electrons”)
	Otto Stern	February 17, 1888; Sohrau, now Poland	August 17, 1969; Berkeley, California, United States	1925, 1927, 1928, 1929, 1930, 1931, 1932, 1933, 1934, 1935, 1936, 1937, 1938, 1939, 1940, 1941, 1943, 1944, 1945	Won the 1943 Nobel Prize in Physics in 1944 (Note: “for his contribution to the development of the molecular ray method and his discovery of the magnetic moment of the proton”)
	Walther Gerlach	August 1, 1889; Biebrich, German Empire	August 10, 1979; Munich, Germany	1925, 1927, 1928, 1929, 1930, 1931, 1932, 1934, 1936, 1937, 1940, 1944	Nominated jointly with Otto Stern only.
	Sigmund Strauss	January 4, 1875; Znaim, now Czechia	March 29, 1942; New York City, United States	1925	Nominated the only time by F.Ehrenhaft.
	John Ambrose Fleming	November 29, 1849; Lancaster, Lancashire, United Kingdom	April 18, 1945; Sidmouth, England	1925, 1927, 1928, 1934	
	Maurice de Broglie	April 27, 1875; Paris, France	July 14, 1960; Neuilly-sur-Seine, France	1925, 1926, 1928, 1930, 1939, 1946	
1926
	Dayton Miller	March 13, 1866; Strongsville, Ohio, United States	February 22, 1941; Cleveland, United States	1926	Nominated the only time by J.Sw.Ames.
	Werner Kolhörster	December 28, 1887; Schwiebus, Brandenburg, now Poland	August 5, 1946; Munich, Germany	1926, 1935	Nominated jointly with E.Goldstein the only time by Ernst Gehrcke.
1927
	Viktor Kaplan	November 27, 1876; Mürzzuschlag, Austria-Hungary	August 23, 1934; Unterach am Attersee, Austria	1927	Nominated the only time by Fr.Niethammer.
	Carl Ramsauer	February 6, 1879; Osternburg, Oldenburg, German Empire	December 24, 1955; Berlin, Germany	1927, 1931	Nominated by R.W.Pohl only.
1928 – Prize was awarded a year later
	Ludwig Prandtl	February 4, 1875; Freising, German Empire	August 15, 1953; Göttingen, Germany	1928, 1937	
	Jacob Aall Bonnevie Bjerknes	November 2, 1897; Stockholm, Sweden	July 7, 1975; Los Angeles, United States	1928, 1936, 1937, 1938, 1939	
	Tor Bergeron	August 15, 1891; Godstone, United Kingdom	June 13, 1977; Uppsala, Sweden	1928, 1937, 1938, 1939	Nominated jointly with J.Bjerknes only
	Halvor Solberg	February 5, 1895; Ringsaker, Norway	January 31, 1974; Oslo, Norway	1928, 1937, 1938, 1939	Nominated jointly with J.Bjerknes only
	Werner Heisenberg	December 5, 1901; Würzburg, German Empire	February 1, 1976; Munich, Germany	1928, 1929, 1930, 1931, 1932, 1933, 1969	Won the 1932 Nobel Prize in Physics in 1933 (Note: “for the creation of quantum mechanics, the application of which has, inter alia, led to the discovery of the allotropic forms of hydrogen”)
	Erwin Schrödinger	August 12, 1887; Vienna, Austria-Hungary	January 4, 1961; Vienna, Austria	1928, 1929, 1930, 1931, 1932, 1933	Shared the 1933 Nobel Prize in Physics (Note: “for the discovery of new productive forms of atomic theory”)
1929					Shared the 1933 Nobel Prize in Physics
	Paul Dirac	August 8, 1902; Bristol, United Kingdom	October 20, 1984; Tallahassee, Florida, United States	1929, 1933	Shared the 1933 Nobel Prize in Physics
	Clinton Davisson	October 22, 1881; Bloomington, Illinois, United States	February 1, 1958; Charlottesville, Virginia, United States	1929, 1930, 1931, 1932, 1933, 1934, 1936, 1937	Shared the 1937 Nobel Prize in Physics with G.P.Thomson (Note: “for their experimental discovery of the diffraction of electrons by crystals”)
	Lester Halbert Germer	October 10, 1896; Chicago, United States	October 3, 1971; Shawangunk Ridge, United States	1929, 1931, 1932, 1933, 1934, 1936, 1937, 1972	
	Emil Warburg	March 9, 1846; Altona, Hamburg, German Confederation	July 28, 1931; Bayreuth, Germany	1929	Nominated the only time by J.Franck.
	Edwin Howard Armstrong	December 18, 1890; Chelsea, Manhattan, New York, United States	February 1, 1954; Manhattan, New York City, United States	1929	Only nominated jointly
	Alexander Meissner	September 14, 1883; Vienna, Austria-Hungary	January 3, 1958; West Berlin, Germany	1929	Only nominated jointly
	Mihajlo Pupin	October 9, 1858; Idvor, now Serbia	March 12, 1935; New York City, United States	1929	
	David Hilbert	January 23, 1862; Wehlau, now Russia	February 14, 1943; Göttingen, Germany	1929, 1930, 1931, 1932, 1933	
	Jean Cabannes	August 12, 1885; Marseille, France	October 31, 1959; Saint-Cyr-sur-Mer, France	1929, 1931, 1943, 1953	
	C. V. Raman	November 7, 1888; Tiruchirappalli, India	November 21, 1970; Bangalore, India	1929, 1930	Won the 1930 Nobel Prize in Physics (Note: “for his work on the scattering of light and for the discovery of the effect named after him”)
1930
	Grigory Landsberg	January 22, 1890; Vologda, Russian Empire	February 2, 1957; Moscow, Russia	1930	Nominated jointly with C. V. Raman and L.Mandelstam the only time by Or.Khvolson.
	Leonid Mandelstam	May 4, 1879; Mogilev, now Belarus	November 27, 1944; Moscow, Russia	1930	
	Max Born	December 11, 1882; Breslau, now Poland	January 5, 1970; Göttingen, Germany	1930, 1934, 1939, 1946, 1947, 1948, 1949, 1950, 1951, 1952, 1953, 1954	Shared the 1954 Nobel Prize in Physics (Note: “for his fundamental research in quantum mechanics, especially for his statistical interpretation of the wavefunction”) with W.W.G.Bothe.
	Henry Norris Russell	October 25, 1877; Oyster Bay, United States	February 18, 1957; Princeton, New Jersey, United States	1930, 1950, 1953	
	Meghnad Saha	October 6, 1893; Shaoratoli near Dhaka, now Bangladesh	February 16, 1956; New Delhi, India	1930, 1937, 1939, 1940, 1951, 1955	
	Ira Sprague Bowen	December 21, 1898; Seneca Falls, New York, United States	February 6, 1973; Hollywood, United States	1930, 1934, 1939, 1950, 1968	

=== 1931–1939 ===
Picture	Name	Born	Died	Years Nominated	Notes
1931 – this year Prize was not awarded
	Victor Francis Hess	June 24, 1883; Schloss Waldstein, Peggau, Austria-Hungary	December 17, 1964; Mount Vernon, New York, United States	1931, 1933, 1935, 1936	Shared the 1936 Nobel Prize in Physics (Note: “for his discovery of cosmic radiation”) with C.D.Anderson.
	George Paget Thomson Wave properties of electrons experimenters	May 3, 1892; Cambridge, United Kingdom	September 10, 1975; Cambridge, England	1931, 1932, 1933, 1934, 1937	Won the 1937 Nobel Prize in Physics with Cl.Davisson
	George Paget Thomson Wave properties of electrons experimenters			1931	They nominated by Ern.G.Merritt the only time Ch.Alg.Parsons nominated by J.Ern.Petavel the only time but died before the only chance to be rewarded.
	Charles Algernon Parsons	June 13, 1854; London, United Kingdom	February 11, 1931; Kingston Harbour, Colony of Jamaica, British Empire	1931	They nominated by Ern.G.Merritt the only time Ch.Alg.Parsons nominated by J.Ern.Petavel the only time but died before the only chance to be rewarded.
	Georges Claude	September 24, 1870; Paris, France	May 23, 1960; Saint-Cloud, France	1931	They nominated by Ern.G.Merritt the only time Ch.Alg.Parsons nominated by J.Ern.Petavel the only time but died before the only chance to be rewarded.
1932 – Prize was awarded a year later
	Kotaro Honda	February 23, 1870; Okazaki, Aichi, Japan	February 12, 1954; Tokyo, Japan	1932	
	Auguste Piccard	January 28, 1884; Basel, Switzerland	March 24, 1962; Lausanne, Switzerland	1932, 1933	
	Arthur Eddington	December 28, 1882; Kendal, United Kingdom	November 22, 1944; Cambridge, England	1932, 1933, 1934, 1935, 1936, 1944	
1933
	Wolfgang Pauli	April 25, 1900; Vienna, Austria-Hungary	December 15, 1958; Zürich, Switzerland	1933, 1934, 1935, 1937, 1938, 1940, 1941, 1942, 1943, 1944, 1945, 1946	Won the 1945 Nobel Prize in Physics (Note: “for the discovery of the Exclusion Principle, also called the Pauli Principle”)
	René-Paul-Eugène Thiry	June 26, 1886; Langres, France	October 5, 1968; Mar Vivo, La Seyne-sur-Mer, France	1933	Nominated the only time by O.Colard from Belgium.
1934 – this year Prize was not awarded
	Carl David Anderson	September 3, 1905; New York City, United States	January 11, 1991; San Marino, California, United States	1934, 1935, 1936, 1941, 1942, 1944, 1945, 1946, 1947, 1948, 1949, 1950, 1951, 1952, 1953	Shared the 1936 Nobel Prize in Physics (Note: “for his discovery of the positron”) with the V.Fr.Hess.
	Walther Bothe	January 8, 1891; Oranienburg, German Empire	February 8, 1957; Heidelberg, Germany	1934, 1935, 1936, 1946, 1949, 1951, 1952, 1953, 1954	Shared the 1954 Nobel Prize in Physics (Note: “for the coincidence method and his discoveries made therewith”) with M.Born
	James Chadwick	October 20, 1891; Bollington, United Kingdom	July 24, 1974; Cambridge, England	1934, 1935, 1936, 1939	Won the 1935 Nobel Prize in Physics (Note: “for the discovery of the neutron”)
	Frédéric Joliot-Curie	March 19, 1900; Paris, France	August 14, 1958; Paris, France	1934, 1935, 1936	Shared the 1935 Nobel Prize in Chemistry
	Irène Joliot-Curie	September 12, 1897; Paris, France	March 17, 1956; Paris, France	1934, 1935, 1936	Shared the 1935 Nobel Prize in Chemistry
	Harold Urey	April 29, 1893; Walkerton, Indiana, United States	January 5, 1981; La Jolla, California, United States	1934	Won the 1934 Nobel Prize in Chemistry.
	Ferdinand Graft Brickwedde	March 26, 1903; Baltimore, United States	March 29, 1989; Linwood, New Jersey, United States	1934	Nominated jointly with H.Urey the only time by Fr.Horton
	George Moseley Murphy	June 1, 1903; Wilmington, North Carolina, United States	December 7, 1968; New York City, United States	1934	Nominated jointly with H.Urey the only time by Fr.Horton
	Gustav Waldemar Elmen	December 22, 1876; Stockholm, Sweden	December 10, 1957; Englewood, New Jersey, United States	1934	Nominated the only time by H.F.Osborn.
	Lars Vegard	February 3, 1880; Vegårshei, Norway	December 21, 1963; Oslo, Norway	1934	Nominated jointly with C.Størmer the only time by Alfred Kalähne.
	Giancarlo Vallauri	October 19, 1882; Rome, Kingdom of Italy	May 7, 1957; Turin, Italy	1934, 1935, 1941	
1935
	Enrico Fermi	September 29, 1901; Rome, Kingdom of Italy	November 28, 1954; Chicago, United States	1935, 1936, 1937, 1938, 1939, 1947, 1948	Won the 1938 Nobel Prize in Physics (Note: “for his demonstrations of the existence of new radioactive elements produced by neutron irradiation, and for his related discovery of nuclear reactions brought about by slow neutrons”) and nominated for the Nobel Prize in Chemistry too.
	Edward Victor Appleton	September 6, 1892; Bradford, United Kingdom	April 21, 1965; Edinburgh, United Kingdom	1935, 1939, 1941, 1942, 1943, 1944, 1946, 1947	Won the 1947 Nobel Prize in Physics (Note: “for his investigations of the physics of the upper atmosphere especially for the discovery of the so-called Appleton layer”)
	Arthur E. Kennelly	December 17, 1861; Colaba, now India	June 18, 1939; Boston, Massachusetts, United States	1935	Nominated jointly with Edw.V.Appleton only.
	Alexander Gurwitsch	September 26, 1874; Poltava, now Ukraine	July 27, 1954; Moscow, Russia	1935	Nominated jointly with H.Dingler and F.Ehrenhaft the only time by L.Zehnder and for the Nobel Prize in Physiology or Medicine too (Note: "Work on mitogenetic radiation")
	Hugo Dingler	July 7, 1881; Munich, German Empire	June 29, 1954; Munich, Germany	1935	Nominated jointly with Al.Gurwitsch the only time by L.Zehnder
	Felix Ehrenhaft	April 24, 1879; Vienna, Austria-Hungary	March 4, 1952; Vienna, Austria	1935	Nominated jointly with Al.Gurwitsch the only time by L.Zehnder
	Abraham Esau	June 7, 1884; Tiegenhagen, now Poland	May 12, 1955; Düsseldorf, Germany	1935	Nominated the only time by A.Gärtner.
	John Cunningham McLennan	October 14, 1867; Ingersoll, Ontario, Canada	October 9, 1935; Paris, France	1935	Nominated the only time by David Arnold Keys (1890–1977). Died before the only chance to be rewarded.
	Fritz Zwicky	February 14, 1898; Varna, Bulgaria	February 8, 1974; Pasadena, California, United States	1935	Nominated the only time by H.Bateman.
	Max Cosyns	May 29, 1906; Schaerbeek, Belgium	March 30, 1998; Brussels, Belgium	1935	Nominated by Fr.-V.-M.Cumont the only time
	Wander Johannes de Haas	March 2, 1878; Lisse, Netherlands	April 26, 1960; Bilthoven, Netherlands	1935, 1936, 1937, 1938, 1939, 1940, 1941, 1942, 1943, 1945	
	Hans Geiger	September 30, 1882; Neustadt an der Haardt, German Empire	September 24, 1945; Potsdam, Germany	1935, 1937, 1955	
	Samuel Goudsmit	July 11, 1902; The Hague, Netherlands	December 4, 1978; Reno, Nevada, United States	1935, 1947, 1951, 1952, 1953, 1954, 1955, 1956, 1957, 1958, 1964, 1965, 1966, 1967, 1968, 1969, 1970, 1971, 1973, 1974, 1975	
1936
	Patrick Blackett	November 18, 1897; London, United Kingdom	July 13, 1974; London, England	1936, 1939, 1940, 1942, 1944, 1945, 1947, 1948, 1949	Won the 1948 Nobel Prize in Physics (Note: “for his development of the Wilson cloud chamber method, and his discoveries therewith in the fields of nuclear physics and cosmic radiation”)
	Giuseppe Occhialini	December 5, 1907; Fossombrone, Kingdom of Italy	December 30, 1993; Paris, France	1936, 1949, 1950, 1952, 1953, 1954, 1955, 1956, 1957, 1958, 1959, 1961, 1963, 1964, 1965 (Note: “All joint nominations with C C Butler have been hidden at the Nomination Archive site”), 1968, 1969	
	Jacob Clay	January 18, 1882; Berkhout, Netherlands	December 31, 1955; De Bilt, Netherlands	1936, 1952	
	Hans (Richard (?)); Becker	December 3, 1887; Hamburg, German Empire (?)	March 16, 1955; Bad Schwalbach, Germany (?)	1936	Nominated by S.J.Barnett the only time
1937
	John Cockcroft	May 27, 1897; Todmorden, United Kingdom	September 18, 1967; Cambridge, England	1935, 1937, 1938, 1939, 1943, 1945, 1946, 1947, 1949, 1951, 1952	Shared the 1951 Nobel Prize in Physics (Note: “for their pioneer work on the transmutation of atomic nuclei by artificially accelerated atomic particles”)
	Ernest Walton	October 6, 1903; Abbeyside, United Kingdom of Great Britain and Ireland	June 25, 1995; Belfast, United Kingdom	1935, 1937, 1938, 1939, 1945, 1947, 1951	Shared the 1951 Nobel Prize in Physics
	Otto Hahn	March 8, 1879; Frankfurt, German Empire	July 28, 1968; Göttingen, Germany	1937, 1940, 1941, 1943, 1945, 1946, 1947	Won the 1944 Nobel Prize in Chemistry in 1945.
	Lise Meitner	November 7, 1878; Vienna, Austria-Hungary	October 27, 1968; Cambridge, United Kingdom	1937, 1940, 1941, 1943, 1945, 1946, 1947, 1948, 1949, 1954, 1955, 1956, 1959, 1961, 1964, 1965, 1967	Nominated for the Nobel Prize in Chemistry too.
	Alfred Lee Loomis	November 4, 1887; Manhattan, New York, United States	August 11, 1975; East Hampton (town), New York, United States	1937	Nominated jointly with R.W.Wood only.
	Nikola Tesla	July 7, 1856; Smiljan, now Croatia	January 7, 1943; New York City, United States	1937	Nominated the only time by F.Ehrenhaft.
	Gilles Holst	March 20, 1886; Haarlem, Netherlands	October 11, 1968; Waalre, Netherlands	1937, 1944	
	Geoffrey Ingram Taylor	March 7, 1886; St. John's Wood, United Kingdom	June 27, 1975; Cambridge, England	1937, 1945, 1953, 1954, 1955, 1956, 1957, 1958, 1959, 1961, 1963, 1968, 1969, 1970, 1973, 1974	Nominated for the Nobel Prize in Chemistry too.
1938
	Ernest Lawrence	August 8, 1901; Canton, South Dakota, United States	August 27, 1958; Palo Alto, California, United States	1938, 1939, 1940	Won the 1939 Nobel Prize in Physics (Note: “for the invention and development of the cyclotron and for results obtained with it, especially with regard to artificial radioactive elements”)
	Erich Regener	November 12, 1881; Schleusenau, now Poland	February 27, 1955; Stuttgart, Germany	1938	Nominated the only time by Erw.Schrödinger.
1939
	Isidor Isaac Rabi	July 29, 1898; Rymanów, now Poland	January 11, 1988; New York City, United States	1939, 1940, 1941, 1942, 1943, 1944, 1945	Won the 1944 Nobel Prize in Physics (Note: “for his resonance method for recording the magnetic properties of atomic nuclei”)
	Albert W. Hull	April 19, 1880; Southington, Connecticut, United States	January 22, 1966; Schenectady, New York, United States	1939	Nominated jointly with P.Debye and P.Scherrer the only time by H.Perlitz.
	Paul Scherrer	February 3, 1890; St. Gallen, Switzerland	September 25, 1969; Zürich, Switzerland	1939, 1951	

=== 1940–1949 ===
Picture	Name	Born	Died	Years Nominated	Notes
1940 – this year Prize was not awarded
	Hideki Yukawa	January 23, 1907; Tokyo, Japan	September 8, 1981; Kyoto, Japan	1940, 1941, 1943, 1944, 1945, 1946, 1948, 1949, 1950	Won the 1949 Nobel Prize in Physics (Note: “for his prediction of the existence of mesons on the basis of theoretical work on nuclear forces”) and nominated for Nobel Peace Prize too
	William Giauque	May 12, 1895; Niagara Falls, Ontario, Canada	March 28, 1982; Berkeley, California, United States	1940	Won the 1949 Nobel Prize in Chemistry.
	Jaroslav Heyrovský	December 20, 1890; Prague, Czechia	March 27, 1967; Prague, Czechia	1940	Won the 1959 Nobel Prize in Chemistry and nominated for the Nobel Prize in Physiology or Medicine too (Note: "The polarographic method and its biological applications")
	Henri Bouasse	November 16, 1866; Paris, France	November 15, 1953; Toulouse, France	1940	Nominated jointly the only time by R. de Mallemann. (Note: Chamberlain' motivation - “whose personal action has avoided a world war, and thus enabled all scientists to pursue their researches”) Chamberlain: Prime Minister of the United Kingdom (1937–1940) Chamberlain nominated for the Nobel Peace Prize too
	Neville Chamberlain	March 8, 1869; Edgbaston, United Kingdom	November 9, 1940; Heckfield, England	1940	Nominated jointly the only time by R. de Mallemann. Chamberlain: Prime Minister of the United Kingdom (1937–1940) Chamberlain nominated for the Nobel Peace Prize too
	Willem Hendrik Keesom	June 21, 1876, Texel, Netherlands	March 24, 1956; Leiden, Netherlands	1940, 1943, 1944, 1945, 1947, 1948, 1955	
1941 – this year Prize was not awarded
	Fritz Strassmann	February 22, 1902; Boppard, German Empire	April 22, 1980; Mainz, Germany	1941, 1945, 1946	Nominated jointly with Otto Hahn only.
	Seth Henry Neddermeyer	September 16, 1907; Richmond, Michigan, United States	January 29, 1988; Seattle, Washington, United States	1941, 1942, 1944, 1945, 1946, 1947, 1948, 1949, 1950, 1951, 1952	Nominated jointly with or by C.D.Anderson only.
	Pierre Victor Auger	May 14, 1899; Paris, France	December 25, 1993; Paris, France	1941, 1947, 1948, 1949, 1951, 1953, 1975	
1942 – this year Prize was not awarded
	George de Hevesy	August 1, 1885; Budapest, Austria-Hungary	July 5, 1966; Freiburg im Breisgau, Germany	1942	Won the 1943 Nobel Prize in Chemistry in 1944 and nominated for the Nobel Prize in Physiology or Medicine too.
1943 – Prize was awarded a year later
	Hans Bethe	July 2, 1906; Strasbourg, now France	March 6, 2005; Ithaca, New York, United States	1943, 1946, 1948, 1949, 1950, 1951, 1953, 1954, 1955, 1956, 1957, 1958, 1959, 1960, 1962, 1964, 1965, 1966, 1967	Won the 1967 Nobel Prize in Physics (Note: “for his contributions to the theory of nuclear reactions, especially his discoveries concerning the energy production in stars”)
	Santiago Antúnez de Mayolo	January 10, 1887; Huacllan District, Aija Province, Department of Ancash, Peru	April 20, 1967; Lima, Peru	1943	Nominated the only time by C.Granda from Lima.
	Donald William Kerst	November 1, 1911; Galena, Illinois, United States	August 19, 1993; Madison, Wisconsin, United States	1943, 1945, 1946, 1947, 1948, 1949, 1951, 1952, 1953, 1956, 1969	
	George Gamow	March 4, 1904; Odesa, now Ukraine	August 19, 1968; Boulder, Colorado, United States	1943, 1946, 1967, 1974	
1944
	Frits Zernike	July 16, 1888 Amsterdam, Netherlands	March 10, 1966 Amersfoort, Netherlands	1944, 1948, 1950, 1951, 1952, 1953	Won the 1953 Nobel Prize in Physics (Note: “for his demonstration of the phase contrast method, especially for his invention of the phase contrast microscope”) and nominated for the Nobel Prize in Chemistry too.
	Henk Dorgelo	February 9, 1894; Dedemsvaart, Netherlands	March 6, 1961; Eindhoven, Netherlands	1944	Nominated jointly with G.Holst the only time by G.J.Elias
	Willem Christiaan van Geel	October 27, 1895; Haarlemmermeer, Netherlands	August 23, 1967; Eindhoven, Netherlands	1944	Nominated jointly with G.Holst the only time by G.J.Elias
	Frans Michel Penning	September 12, 1894; Gorinchem, Netherlands	December 6, 1953; Utrecht, Netherlands	1944	Nominated jointly with G.Holst the only time by G.J.Elias
1945
	Bernard Lyot	February 27, 1897; Paris, France	April 2, 1952; Cairo, Egypt	1945, 1947, 1948, 1949, 1950, 1951, 1952	
	Otto Robert Frisch	October 1, 1904; Vienna, Austria-Hungary	September 22, 1979; Cambridge, United Kingdom	1945, 1946, 1947, 1948, 1959, 1961, 1963, 1967	Nominated for the Nobel Prize in Chemistry too.
1946
	Pyotr Kapitsa	July 8, 1894; Kronstadt, Russian Empire	April 8, 1984; Moscow, Russia	1946, 1947, 1948, 1950, 1953, 1955, 1956, 1957, 1958, 1959, 1960, 1965, 1966, 1968, 1969, 1970, 1971, 1972, 1973, 1974, 1975	Shared the 1978 Nobel Prize in Physics (Note: “for his basic inventions and discoveries in the area of low-temperature physics”) with A.A.Penzias and R.W.Wilson
	Nuclear Scientists			1946, 1947	
	Arthur Jeffrey Dempster	August 14, 1886; Toronto, Canada	March 11, 1950; Stuart, Florida, United States	1946, 1948	
	Francis Simon	July 2, 1893; Berlin, German Empire	October 31, 1956; Oxford, United Kingdom	1946, 1953, 1956	Nominated for the Nobel Prize in Chemistry too.
	J. Robert Oppenheimer	April 22, 1904; New York City, United States	February 18, 1967; Princeton, New Jersey, United States	1946, 1951, 1955, 1967	
1947
	Edwin McMillan	September 18, 1907; Redondo Beach, California, United States	September 7, 1991; El Cerrito, California, United States	1947, 1948, 1951, 1956, 1965	Shared the 1951 Nobel Prize in Chemistry with Gl.T.Seaborg.
	Vladimir Veksler	March 4, 1907; Zhytomyr, now Ukraine	September 22, 1966; Moscow, Russia	1947, 1948, 1951, 1956, 1957, 1959, 1964, 1965	
	Camille Gutton	August 30, 1872; Nancy, France	August 19, 1963; Saint-Nom-la-Bretèche, France	1947	Nominated the only time by L. de Broglie.
	Robert Serber	March 14, 1909; Philadelphia, United States	June 1, 1997; New York City, United States	1947	Nominated jointly with D.W.Kerst by Cz.Białobrzeski the only time.
	Karl-Friedrich Bonhoeffer	January 13, 1899; Breslau, now Poland	May 15, 1957; Göttingen, Germany	1947, 1949	Nominated by W.Heisenberg only and for the Nobel Prize in Chemistry too.
	Klaus Clusius	March 19, 1903; Breslau, now Poland	May 28, 1963; Zürich, Switzerland	1947, 1949, 1953, 1955, 1956, 1957, 1958, 1959, 1960, 1962, 1963	Nominated for the Nobel Prize in Chemistry too.
	Walther Meissner	December 16, 1882; Berlin, German Empire	November 16, 1974; Munich, Germany	1947, 1950, 1955, 1966, 1967	
	Dmitri Skobeltsyn	November 24, 1892; Saint Petersburg, Russian Empire	November 16, 1990; Moscow, Russia	1947	Nominated jointly with Br.Rossi, P.Blackett and P.V.Auger the only time by Cz.Białobrzeski.
	Bruno B. Rossi	April 13, 1905; Venice, Kingdom of Italy	November 21, 1993; Cambridge, Massachusetts, United States	1947, 1948, 1949, 1952, 1954, 1955, 1956, 1957, 1958, 1959, 1960, 1961, 1962, 1963, 1965, 1966, 1967, 1968, 1971, 1973, 1975	
	Llewellyn Hilleth Thomas	October 21, 1903; London, United Kingdom	April 20, 1992; Raleigh, North Carolina, United States	1947, 1968	Nominated jointly with S.Goudsmit and G.Uhlenbeck only.
	George Eugene Uhlenbeck	December 6, 1900; Batavia, now Indonesia	October 31, 1988; Boulder, Colorado, United States	1947, 1951, 1952, 1953, 1954, 1955, 1956, 1957, 1958, 1964, 1965, 1966, 1967, 1968, 1969, 1970, 1971, 1973, 1974, 1975	Nominated jointly with S.Goudsmit only.
1948
	Helmut Scheffers	September 13, 1898; Darmstadt, German Empire	February 25, 1963; West Berlin, Germany	1948	Nominated the only time by J.Stark.
	Balthasar van der Pol	January 27, 1889; Utrecht, Netherlands	October 6, 1959; Wassenaar, Netherlands	1948, 1949, 1950	Nominated by brothers Louis and M. de Broglie only.
	Marcel Schein	June 9, 1902; Trstená, now Slovakia	February 20, 1960; Chicago, United States	1948, 1949, 1951, 1952	
	Walter Grotrian	April 21, 1890; Aachen, German Empire	March 3, 1954; Potsdam, Germany	1948	Nominated jointly with B.Edlén and B.Lyot the only time by Alfred Kastler.
	Henry Lincoln Yeagley, Sr.	July 17, 1899; York, Pennsylvania, United States	December 26, 1996; State College, Pennsylvania, United States	1948	Nominated jointly with R.W.Pohl the only time by W.O.Schumann
	Karl Guthe Jansky	October 22, 1905; Norman, Oklahoma, United States	February 14, 1950; Red Bank, New Jersey, United States	1948	Nominated jointly with R.W.Pohl the only time by W.O.Schumann
	Robert Wichard Pohl	August 10, 1884; Hamburg, German Empire	June 5, 1976; Göttingen, Germany	1948, 1953, 1957, 1959, 1967	
	Bengt Edlén	November 2, 1906, Gusum, Sweden	February 10, 1993; Lund, Sweden	1948, 1950, 1954, 1956, 1957, 1960, 1963, 1964, 1974	
	Felix Bloch	October 23, 1905; Zürich, Switzerland	September 10, 1983; Zürich, Switzerland	1948, 1949, 1950, 1951, 1952, 1953, 1974	Shared the 1952 Nobel Prize in Physics (Note: “for their development of new methods for nuclear magnetic precision measurements and discoveries in connection therewith”)
1949					Shared the 1952 Nobel Prize in Physics
	Edward Mills Purcell	August 30, 1912; Taylorville, Illinois, United States	March 7, 1997; Cambridge, Massachusetts, United States	1949, 1950, 1951, 1952	Shared the 1952 Nobel Prize in Physics
	C. F. Powell	December 5, 1903; Tonbridge, United Kingdom	August 9, 1969; Valsassina, Italy	1949, 1950, 1951	Won the 1950 Nobel Prize in Physics (Note: “for his development of the photographic method of studying nuclear processes and his discoveries regarding mesons made with this method”)
	Vannevar Bush	March 11, 1890; Everett, Massachusetts, United States	June 28, 1974; Belmont, Massachusetts, United States	1949	Nominated the only time by Arthur C. Hardy.
	Alfred Otto Carl Nier	May 28, 1911; St. Paul, Minnesota, United States	May 16, 1994; Hennepin County Medical Center, United States	1949	Nominated the only time by J.L.Kerwin and for the Nobel Prize in Chemistry too.
	Albert Portevin	November 1, 1880; Paris, France	April 12, 1962; Abano Terme, Italy	1949	Nominated the only time by C.Benedicks and for the Nobel Prize in Chemistry too.
	Leo Szilard	February 11, 1898; Budapest, Austria-Hungary	May 30, 1964; San Diego, United States	1949	Nominated the only time by M.Goldhaber and for the Nobel Prize in Chemistry too.
	Hans Kramers	February 2, 1894; Rotterdam, Netherlands	April 24, 1952; Oegstgeest, Netherlands	1949, 1950, 1952	
	Harold Jeffreys	22 April 1891; Fatfield, United Kingdom	18 March 1989; Cambridge, England	1949, 1964, 1966	
	Edward Carl Stevenson	March 9, 1907; Sumpter, Oregon, United States	July 23, 2002; Charlottesville, Virginia, United States	1949	Nominated jointly with C.D.Anderson, S.Neddermeyer, H.Yukawa and J.C.Street the only time by Peter Gerald Kruger (1902–1978) from Urbana, Illinois, United States
	Jabez Curry Street	May 5, 1906; Opelika, Alabama, United States	November 7, 1989; Charleston, South Carolina, United States	1949, 1953, 1954, 1955, 1956, 1959, 1962, 1967	
	Lawrence Randolph Hafstad	June 18, 1904; Minneapolis, United States	October 12, 1993; Oldwick, New Jersey, United States	1949	Nominated jointly with Gr.Breit the only time by W.S.Adams
	Merle Anthony Tuve	June 27, 1901; Canton, South Dakota, United States	May 20, 1982; Bethesda, Maryland, United States	1949	Nominated jointly with Gr.Breit the only time by W.S.Adams
	Gregory Breit	July 14, 1899; Mykolaiv, now Ukraine	September 13, 1981; Salem, Oregon, United States	1949, 1970, 1971, 1972, 1973, 1975	
	Eugene Hill Gardner	March 22, 1913; Logan, Utah, United States	November 27, 1950; Vallejo, California, United States	1949	Nominated jointly with C.Lattes the only time by W.Sc.Hill Rodriguez (1903–1987) from Montevideo.
	Cesare Mansueto Giulio Lattes	July 11, 1924; Curitiba, Brazil	March 8, 2005; Campinas, Brazil	1949, 1951, 1952, 1953, 1954, 1975	

=== 1950–1959 ===
Picture	Name	Born	Died	Years Nominated	Notes
1950
	Georg von Békésy	June 3, 1899; Budapest, Austria-Hungary	June 13, 1972; Honolulu, United States	1950, 1953, 1954, 1958	Won the 1961 Nobel Prize in Physiology or Medicine.
	Josef Mattauch	November 21, 1895; Ostrava, Czechia	August 10, 1976; Klosterneuburg, Austria	1950	Nominated jointly with W.Kossel the only time by F.K.L.Machatschki and for the Nobel Prize in Chemistry too.
	Walther Kossel	January 4, 1888; Berlin, German Empire	May 22, 1956; Tübingen, Germany	1950, 1954, 1955	Nominated for the Nobel Prize in Chemistry too.
	Hertha Wambacher	March 9, 1903; Vienna, Austria-Hungary	April 25, 1950; Vienna, Austria	1950	Nominated jointly with M.Blau the only time by Erwin Schrödinger. Died before the only chance to be rewarded.
	Marietta Blau	April 29, 1894; Vienna, Austria-Hungary	January 27, 1970; Vienna, Austria	1950, 1955, 1956, 1957	Nominated for the Nobel Prize in Chemistry too.
	Horace Welcome Babcock	September 13, 1912; Pasadena, California, United States	August 29, 2003; Santa Barbara, California, United States	1950, 1956, 1958	Nominated by Al.H.G.Dauvillier (Note: French physicist Alexandre Henri Georges Dauvillier (5 May 1892 Saint-Lubin-des-Joncherets – 23 September 1979 Bagnères-de-Bigorre) from Paris) only
	Grote Reber	December 22, 1911; Wheaton, Illinois, United States	December 20, 2002; Ouse, Tasmania, Australia	1950, 1967, 1969	
1951
	Julian Schwinger	February 12, 1918; New York City, United States	July 16, 1994; Los Angeles, United States	1951, 1952, 1956, 1957, 1960, 1962, 1963, 1964, 1965, 1966	Shared the 1965 Nobel Prize in Physics with R.Ph.Feynman (Note: “for their fundamental work in quantum electrodynamics, with deep-ploughing consequences for the physics of elementary particles”)
	Shin'ichirō Tomonaga	March 31, 1906; Tokyo, Japan	July 8, 1979; Tokyo, Japan	1951, 1952, 1955, 1956, 1957, 1960, 1962, 1963, 1964, 1965	Shared the 1965 Nobel Prize in Physics with R.Ph.Feynman
	Luis Walter Alvarez	June 13, 1911; San Francisco, California, United States	September 1, 1988; Berkeley, California, United States	1951, 1953, 1960, 1962, 1963, 1964, 1965, 1966, 1967, 1968	Won the 1968 Nobel Prize in Physics (Note: “for his decisive contributions to elementary particle physics, in particular the discovery of a large number of resonance states, made possible through his development of the technique of using hydrogen bubble chamber and data analysis”)
	Willis Lamb	July 12, 1913; Los Angeles, United States	May 15, 2008; Tucson, United States	1951, 1952, 1953, 1954, 1955	Shared the 1955 Nobel Prize in Physics (Note: “for his discoveries concerning the fine structure of the hydrogen spectrum”) with P.Kusch
	Robert Curtis Retherford	March 20, 1912; Carthage, Indiana, United States	1981	1951, 1952, 1953, 1955	Nominated jointly with W.Lamb only.
	William Francis Gray Swann	August 29, 1884; Ironbridge Gorge, United Kingdom	January 29, 1962; Swarthmore, Pennsylvania, United States	1951, 1952, 1953	Nominated jointly with C.D.Anderson by V.Fr.Hess only.
	Homi J. Bhabha	October 30, 1909; Bombay, India	January 24, 1966; Mont Blanc, Alps	1951, 1953, 1954, 1955, 1956	Nominated by J.Hadamard only.
	Wolfgang K. H. Panofsky	April 24, 1919; Berlin, Germany	September 24, 2007; Los Altos, California, United States	1951, 1952, 1953, 1956, 1957, 1959, 1962, 1967, 1971, 1972, 1973, 1974	
	Erwin Wilhelm Müller	June 13, 1911; Berlin, German Empire	May 17, 1977; Washington, D.C., United States	1951, 1952, 1953, 1957, 1959, 1960, 1962, 1963, 1966, 1968, 1969, 1970, 1971, 1972, 1973, 1974, 1975	Nominated for the Nobel Prize in Chemistry too.
	Pascual Jordan	18 October 1902; Hannover, German Empire	31 July 1980; Hamburg, Germany	1951, 1963, 1967, 1970, 1971, 1972, 1973, 1974, 1975	
	John Hasbrouck Van Vleck	March 13, 1899; Middletown, Connecticut, United States	October 27, 1980; Cambridge, Massachusetts, United States	1951, 1961, 1965, 1966, 1967, 1968, 1969, 1970, 1971, 1972, 1973, 1974, 1975	Shared the 1977 Nobel Prize in Physics with Ph.W.Anderson (Note: “for their fundamental theoretical investigations of the electronic structure of magnetic and disordered systems”)
1952					Shared the 1977 Nobel Prize in Physics with Ph.W.Anderson
	Nevill Francis Mott	September 30, 1905; Leeds, United Kingdom	August 8, 1996; Milton Keynes, England	1952, 1958, 1960, 1961, 1968, 1969, 1970, 1971, 1972, 1973, 1974, 1975	Shared the 1977 Nobel Prize in Physics with Ph.W.Anderson
	Polykarp Kusch	January 26, 1911; Blankenburg (Harz), German Empire	March 20, 1993; Dallas, United States	1952, 1955	Shared the 1955 Nobel Prize in Physics (Note: “for his precision determination of the magnetic moment of the electron”) with W.Lamb
	Pavel Cherenkov	July 28, 1904; Novaya Chigla, Russian Empire	January 6, 1990; Moscow, Russia	1952, 1955, 1956, 1957, 1958	Shared the 1958 Nobel Prize in Physics with Ig.Tamm and Il.Frank (Note: “for the discovery and the interpretation of the Cherenkov effect”)
	Lars Onsager	November 27, 1903; Kristiania, Norway	October 5, 1976; Coral Gables, Florida, United States	1952, 1953, 1954, 1956, 1957, 1958, 1961, 1963, 1964, 1965, 1966, 1967, 1968	Won the 1968 Nobel Prize in Chemistry.
	Helmut L. Bradt	December 11, 1917; Berlin, German Empire	May 24, 1950; Brooklyn, United States	1952	Nominated jointly (Bradt – posthumously) with J.Clay the only time by Al.H.G.Dauvillier
	Bernard Peters	December 22, 1910; Posen, now Poland	February 2, 1993; Copenhagen, Denmark	1952	Nominated jointly (Bradt – posthumously) with J.Clay the only time by Al.H.G.Dauvillier
	Samuel Jackson Barnett	December 14, 1873; Woodson County, Kansas, United States	May 22, 1956; Pasadena, California, United States	1952, 1953, 1954, 1955, 1956	
	Georges Destriau	1 August 1903; Bordeaux, France	20 January 1960; Paris, France	1952, 1962	
	Louis Néel	November 22, 1904; Lyon, France	November 17, 2000; Brive-la-Gaillarde, France	1952, 1953, 1954, 1955, 1956, 1957, 1958, 1959, 1960, 1961, 1962, 1963, 1964, 1965, 1966, 1967, 1968, 1969, 1970	(Note: “for fundamental work and discoveries concerning antiferromagnetism and ferrimagnetism which have led to important applications in solid state physics”) Shared the 1970 Nobel Prize in Physics; L.Néel nominated for the Nobel Prize in Chemistry too (Note: “for fundamental work and discoveries in magnetohydro-dynamics with fruitful applications in different parts of plasma physics”)
1953					Shared the 1970 Nobel Prize in Physics; L.Néel nominated for the Nobel Prize in Chemistry too
	Hannes Alfvén	May 30, 1908; Norrköping, Sweden	April 2, 1995; Djursholm, Sweden	1953, 1960, 1961, 1962, 1963, 1964, 1965, 1966, 1967, 1968, 1969, 1970	Shared the 1970 Nobel Prize in Physics; L.Néel nominated for the Nobel Prize in Chemistry too
	Emilio Segrè	February 1, 1905; Tivoli, Italy	April 22, 1989; Lafayette, California, United States	1953, 1956, 1957, 1958, 1959	Shared the 1959 Nobel Prize in Physics with O.Chamberlain (Note: “for their discovery of the antiproton”) and nominated for the Nobel Prize in Chemistry too
	Eugene Wigner	November 17, 1902; Budapest, Austria-Hungary	January 1, 1995; Princeton, New Jersey, United States	1953, 1955, 1957, 1958, 1959, 1960, 1961, 1962, 1963, 1974	Shared the 1963 Nobel Prize in Physics (Note: “for his contributions to the theory of the atomic nucleus and the elementary particles, particularly through the discovery and application of fundamental symmetry principles”) with J.H.D.Jensen and M.Goeppert-Mayer
	Willard Libby	December 17, 1908; Grand Valley, United States	September 8, 1980; Los Angeles, United States	1953, 1956, 1957, 1960	Won the 1960 Nobel Prize in Chemistry.
	Edwin Hubble	November 20, 1889; Marshfield, Missouri, United States	September 28, 1953; San Marino, California, United States	1953	Died before the only chance to be rewarded.
	Carl Friedrich von Weizsäcker	June 28, 1912; Kiel, German Empire	April 28, 2007; Starnberg, Germany	1953, 1958, 1964, 1965	
	Robert J. Van de Graaff	December 20, 1901; Tuscaloosa, Alabama, United States	January 16, 1967; Boston, Massachusetts, United States	1953, 1964, 1966	
	Louis Leprince-Ringuet	March 27, 1901; Alès, France	December 23, 2000; Paris, France	1953, 1954, 1955, 1956, 1957, 1960, 1966, 1967	
	John Bardeen	May 23, 1908; Madison, Wisconsin, United States	January 30, 1991; Boston, Massachusetts, United States	1953, 1954, 1955, 1956, 1961, 1963, 1965, 1966, 1967, 1968, 1969, 1970, 1971, 1972	J.Bardeen shared 1972 Nobel Prize in Physics with L.Cooper and J.R.Schrieffer (Note: “for their jointly developed theory of superconductivity, usually called the BCS-theory”) too W.H.Brattain nominated for the Nobel Prize in Chemistry too Shared the 1956 Nobel Prize in Physics (Note: “for their researches on semiconductors and their discovery of the transistor effect”)
	Walter Houser Brattain	February 10, 1902; Xiamen, China	October 13, 1987; Seattle, Washington, United States	1953, 1954, 1956	J.Bardeen shared 1972 Nobel Prize in Physics with L.Cooper and J.R.Schrieffer too W.H.Brattain nominated for the Nobel Prize in Chemistry too Shared the 1956 Nobel Prize in Physics
1954					J.Bardeen shared 1972 Nobel Prize in Physics with L.Cooper and J.R.Schrieffer too W.H.Brattain nominated for the Nobel Prize in Chemistry too Shared the 1956 Nobel Prize in Physics
	William Shockley	February 13, 1910; Greater London, United Kingdom	August 12, 1989; Stanford, California, United States	1954, 1955, 1956	J.Bardeen shared 1972 Nobel Prize in Physics with L.Cooper and J.R.Schrieffer too W.H.Brattain nominated for the Nobel Prize in Chemistry too Shared the 1956 Nobel Prize in Physics
	Lev Landau	January 22, 1908; Baku, now Azerbaijan	April 1, 1968; Moscow, Russia	1954, 1956, 1957, 1958, 1959, 1960, 1962, 1963	Won the 1962 Nobel Prize in Physics (Note: “for his pioneering theories for condensed matter, especially liquid helium”)
	Fritz London	March 7, 1900; Breslau, now Poland	March 30, 1954; Durham, North Carolina, United States	1954	Nominated jointly with L.Landau the only time by R.Marschak and for the Nobel Prize in Chemistry too. Died before the chance to be rewarded.
	Ilya Prigogine	January 25, 1917; Moscow, Russian Empire	May 28, 2003; Brussels, Belgium	1954, 1958, 1964, 1970, 1972, 1973, 1974, 1975	Won the 1977 Nobel Prize in Chemistry.
	Jean Laval	January 31, 1900; Saint-Pardoux-le-Vieux, France	March 4, 1980; Paris, France	1954	Nominated the only time by A.Lichnorowicz.
	Georges Lemaître	July 17, 1894; Charleroi, Belgium	June 20, 1966; Leuven, Belgium	1954	Nominated the only time by Al.H.G.Dauvillier and for the Nobel Prize in Chemistry too.
	Zworykin, Vladimir Kosma	July 29, 1888; Murom, Russian Empire	July 29, 1982; Princeton, New Jersey, United States	1954	Nominated the only time by Vitomir H. Pavloviћ (9.II 1897, Опланићи – 1959) from the University of Belgrade.
	James Gilbert Baker	November 11, 1914; Louisville, Kentucky, United States	June 29, 2005; Bedford, New Hampshire, United States	1954	Nominated jointly with Edw.H.Land, B.Edlén and M.Deutsch the only time by H.Shapley
	Edward Linfoot	June 8, 1905; Sheffield, United Kingdom	October 14, 1982; Cambridge, England	1954	Nominated jointly with Edw.H.Land, B.Edlén and M.Deutsch the only time by H.Shapley
	Karl Lark-Horovitz	July 20, 1892; Vienna, Austria-Hungary	April 14, 1958; West Lafayette, Indiana, United States	1954	Nominated jointly with Edw.H.Land, B.Edlén and M.Deutsch the only time by H.Shapley
	Maurice Goldhaber	April 18, 1911; Lviv, now Ukraine	May 11, 2011; East Setauket, New York, United States	1954, 1959, 1960, 1962, 1970	
	Edwin Herbert Land	May 7, 1909; Bridgeport, Connecticut, United States	March 1, 1991; Cambridge, Massachusetts, United States	1954, 1973, 1974	Nominated for the Nobel Prize in Chemistry too
	Martin Deutsch	January 29, 1917; Vienna, Austria-Hungary	August 16, 2002; Cambridge, Massachusetts, United States	1954, 1955, 1956, 1957, 1958, 1960, 1974	Nominated for the Nobel Prize in Chemistry too.
1955
	Ernst Ruska	December 25, 1906; Heidelberg, German Empire	May 27, 1988; West Berlin, Germany	1955, 1957, 1960, 1961, 1965, 1966, 1969, 1970, 1971, 1972, 1973, 1974	Shared the 1986 Nobel Prize in Physics (Note: “for his fundamental work in electron optics, and for the design of the first electron microscope”) with G.Binnig and H.Rohrer and nominated for the Nobel Prizes both in Chemistry and Physiology or Medicine too. (Note: "Development of the electron microscope")
	Bodo von Borries	May 22, 1905; Herford, German Empire	July 17, 1956; Aachen, Germany	1955	Nominated jointly with Ernst Ruska only and for the Nobel Prize in Physiology or Medicine too.
	Max Knoll	July 17, 1897; Schlangenbad, German Empire	November 6, 1969; Munich, Germany	1955, 1957, 1961, 1967	
	Léon Brillouin	August 7, 1889; Sèvres, France	October 4, 1969; New York City, United States	1955, 1957, 1960, 1965, 1967, 1969	
	George Rochester	February 4, 1908; Wallsend, United Kingdom	December 26, 2001; Durham, England	1955, 1957, 1958, 1959, 1961, 1962, 1963, 1964, 1965, 1966, 1967, 1968, 1969, 1974	
	Christiaan Alexander Muller	April 18, 1923; Alkmaar, Netherlands	August 8, 2004; Delden, Netherlands	1955, 1956, 1957, 1958, 1961	Nominated jointly with J.Oort and H.C. van de Hulst only.
	Jan Oort	April 28, 1900; Franeker, Netherlands	November 5, 1992; Leiden, Netherlands	1955, 1956, 1957, 1958, 1959, 1960, 1961, 1971, 1974, 1975	
	Hendrik C. van de Hulst	November 19, 1918; Utrecht, Netherlands	July 31, 2000; Leiden, Netherlands	1955, 1956, 1957, 1958, 1960, 1961, 1964, 1966, 1967, 1968, 1972, 1973, 1974	
	J. Hans D. Jensen	June 25, 1907; Hamburg, German Empire	February 11, 1973; Heidelberg, Germany	1955, 1956, 1957, 1958, 1959, 1960, 1961, 1962, 1963	Shared the 1963 Nobel Prize in Physics (Note: “for their discoveries concerning nuclear shell structure”) with E.Wigner and nominated for the Nobel Prize in Chemistry too
	Maria Goeppert Mayer	June 28, 1906; Kattowitz, now Poland	February 20, 1972; San Diego, California, United States	1955, 1956, 1957, 1958, 1959, 1960, 1962, 1963	Shared the 1963 Nobel Prize in Physics with E.Wigner and nominated for the Nobel Prize in Chemistry too
1956
	Otto Haxel	April 2, 1909, Neu-Ulm, German Empire	February 26, 1998; Heidelberg, Germany	1956, 1957	Nominated jointly with J.H.D.Jensen and M.Goeppert Mayer by Karl Freudenberg only
	Hans Suess	December 16, 1909; Vienna, Austria-Hungary	September 20, 1993; La Jolla, California, United States	1956, 1957	Nominated jointly with J.H.D.Jensen and M.Goeppert Mayer by Karl Freudenberg only
	Richard Feynman	May 11, 1918; New York City, United States	February 15, 1988; Los Angeles, United States	1956, 1957, 1960, 1962, 1963, 1964, 1965, 1967	Shared the 1965 Nobel Prize in Physics with J.Schwinger and Sh.Tomonaga
	Alfred Kastler	3 May 1902; Guebwiller, now France	7 January 1984; Bandol, France	1956, 1958, 1959, 1960, 1961, 1962, 1963, 1964, 1965, 1966	Won the 1966 Nobel Prize in Physics (Note: “for the discovery and development of optical methods for studying Hertzian resonances in atoms”)
	Dorothy Crowfoot Hodgkin	May 12, 1910; Cairo, Egypt	July 29, 1994; Ilmington, United Kingdom	1956, 1957, 1959, 1960, 1961	Won the 1964 Nobel Prize in Chemistry.
	Jan Hendrik de Boer	March 19, 1899; Ruinen, Netherlands	April 25, 1971; The Hague, Netherlands	1956	Nominated the only time by Antoine Hautot (1909–1998) from Liège.
	Lee de Forest	August 26, 1873; Council Bluffs, Iowa, United States	June 30, 1961; Hollywood, United States	1956	Nominated the only time by Cl.Davisson.
	Mark Oliphant	October 8, 1901; Adelaide, Australia	July 14, 2000; Canberra, Australia	1956	Nominated the only time by L.Ružička.
	Gerald Leondus Pearson	March 31, 1905; Salem, Oregon, United States	October 25, 1987; Portola Valley, California, United States	1956	Nominated jointly with J.Bardeen and W.H.Brattain the only time by Mariano Velasco Durántez (1897–1984) from University of Barcelona.
	Gustav Ising	February 19, 1883; Finja, Sweden	February 5, 1960; Danderyd Municipality, Sweden	1956	Nominated jointly with D.W.Kerst and R.Widerøe the only time by Ern.Walton.
	Rolf Widerøe	July 11, 1902; Kristiania, Norway	October 11, 1996; Obersiggenthal, Switzerland	1956, 1969, 1975	Nominated jointly with D.W.Kerst.
	Sydney Chapman	January 29, 1888; Eccles, Greater Manchester, United Kingdom	June 16, 1970; Boulder, Colorado, United States	1956, 1959, 1961, 1963, 1967, 1968, 1970	
	Satyendra Nath Bose	January 1, 1894; Calcutta, India	February 4, 1974; Calcutta, India	1956, 1959, 1962, 1968, 1969, 1970, 1971, 1972, 1974	
	Cornelis Jacobus Gorter	August 14, 1907, Utrecht, Netherlands	30 March 1980; Leiden, Netherlands	1956, 1957, 1959, 1964, 1965, 1966, 1968, 1969, 1970, 1971, 1972, 1973, 1975	
1957
	Igor Tamm	July 8, 1895; Vladivostok, Russian Empire	April 12, 1971; Moscow, Russia	1957, 1958	Shared the 1958 Nobel Prize in Physics with P.A.Cherenkov
	Ilya Frank	October 23, 1908; Saint Petersburg, Russian Empire	June 22, 1990; Moscow, Russia	1957, 1958	Shared the 1958 Nobel Prize in Physics with P.A.Cherenkov
	Sergey Ivanovich Vavilov	March 24, 1891; Moscow, Russian Empire	January 25, 1951; Moscow, Russia	1957, 1958	Posthumously nominated jointly with P.A.Cherenkov only.
	Owen Chamberlain	July 10, 1920; San Francisco, California, United States	February 28, 2006; Berkeley, California, United States	1957, 1958, 1959	Shared the 1959 Nobel Prize in Physics with Em.Segrè
	Subrahmanyan Chandrasekhar	October 19, 1910; Lahore, now Pakistan	August 21, 1995; Chicago, United States	1957, 1962, 1968, 1969, 1970, 1971, 1972, 1973, 1974, 1975	Shared the 1983 Nobel Prize in Physics (Note: “for his theoretical studies of the physical processes of importance to the structure and evolution of the stars”) with W.A.Fowler.
	Clifford Shull	September 23, 1915; Pittsburgh, Pennsylvania, United States	March 31, 2001; Medford, Massachusetts, United States	1957, 1968, 1971, 1972, 1974, 1975	Shared the 1994 Nobel Prize in Physics (Note: “for the development of the neutron diffraction technique”) with B.N.Brockhouse.
	Ernest Omar Wollan	November 6, 1902; Glenwood, Minnesota, United States	March 11, 1984; Minneapolis, United States	1957, 1971, 1972, 1974, 1975	Nominated jointly with Cl.Shull and L.Néel the only time by Ivar Waller.
	Frederick Reines	March 16, 1918; Paterson, New Jersey, United States	August 26, 1998; Orange, California, United States	1957, 1958, 1959, 1960, 1961, 1962, 1963, 1964, 1965, 1966, 1967, 1972, 1973, 1974, 1975	Shared the 1995 Nobel Prize in Physics (Note: “for the detection of the neutrino”) with M.L.Perl
	Clyde Lorrain Cowan, Jr.	December 6, 1919; Detroit, United States	May 24, 1974; Bethesda, Maryland, United States	1957, 1958, 1959, 1960, 1961, 1962, 1963, 1964, 1965, 1966, 1967, 1972, 1973	Nominated jointly with Fr.Reines only.
	Carl-Gustaf Rossby	December 28, 1898; Stockholm, Sweden	August 19, 1957; Stockholm, Sweden	1957	Nominated the only time by H.Pettersson. Died before the only chance to be rewarded.
	Gersh Budker	May 1, 1918; Murafa, near Vinnytsia, now Ukraine	July 4, 1977; Akademgorodok, Russia	1957	Nominated jointly with Vl.I.Veksler the only time by L.Ružička
	Alexey Naumov	January 27, 1916; Petrograd, Russian Empire	November 22, 1985; Protvino, Russia	1957	Nominated jointly with Vl.I.Veksler the only time by L.Ružička
	Hans Busch	February 27, 1884; Jüchen, German Empire	February 16, 1973; Darmstadt, Germany	1957	Nominated jointly with Ernst Ruska and M.Knoll only.
	Clifford Charles Butler	May 20, 1922; Reading, Berkshire, United Kingdom	June 30, 1999; Glenfield Hospital, England	1957, 1958, 1959, 1961, 1962, 1963, 1964, 1965, 1966, 1967, 1968, 1969	Nominated jointly with George Rochester only (Note: “Data of C C Butler (id 13849) has been hidden at the Nomination Archive site”)
	Ettore Pancini	August 10, 1915; Stanghella, Kingdom of Italy	September 2, 1981; Venice, Italy	1957, 1963, 1972, 1973	Nominated jointly with M.Conversi only
	Oreste Piccioni	October 24, 1915; Siena, Kingdom of Italy	April 13, 2002; Rancho Santa Fe, California, United States	1957, 1963, 1972, 1973	Nominated jointly with M.Conversi only
	Marcello Conversi	August 25, 1917; Tivoli, Lazio, Kingdom of Italy	September 22, 1988; Rome, Italy	1957, 1963, 1965, 1971, 1972, 1973, 1974	
	Brebis Bleaney	June 6, 1915; Chelsea, London, United Kingdom	November 4, 2006; Oxford, England	1957, 1959, 1966, 1971, 1975	
	Yang Chen-Ning	October 1, 1922; Hefei, China	October 18, 2025; Beijing, China	1957, 1958	Shared the 1957 Nobel Prize in Physics (Note: “for their penetrating investigation of the so-called parity laws which has led to important discoveries regarding the elementary particles”)
	Tsung-Dao Lee	November 24, 1926; Shanghai, China	August 4, 2024; San Francisco, California, United States	1957, 1958	Shared the 1957 Nobel Prize in Physics
1958
	Chien-Shiung Wu	May 31, 1912; Liuhe, Taicang, China	February 16, 1997; New York City, United States	1958, 1959 (Note: The nomination (id 15221) by Jean Rossel (1918-2006) has been hidden at the Nomination Archive site), 1960, 1964, 1965, 1967, 1968, 1970, 1971, 1972, 1973, 1974, 1975	(Note: “Data of Wu (id 14754) has been hidden at the Nomination Archive site”)
	Robert Hofstadter	February 5, 1915; New York City, United States	November 17, 1990; Stanford, California, United States	1958, 1959, 1960, 1961	Shared the 1961 Nobel Prize in Physics (Note: “for his pioneering studies of electron scattering in atomic nuclei and for his thereby achieved discoveries concerning the structure of the nucleons”) with R.L.Mössbauer.
	Charles H. Townes	July 28, 1915; Greenville, South Carolina, United States	January 27, 2015; Oakland, California, United States	1958, 1959, 1960, 1961, 1962, 1963, 1964, 1965	Shared the 1964 Nobel Prize in Physics with Al.M.Prokhorov and N.G.Basov (Note: “for fundamental work in the field of quantum electronics, which has led to the construction of oscillators and amplifiers based on the maser-laser principle”)
	Abdus Salam	January 29, 1926; Jhang, now Pakistan	November 21, 1996; Oxford, United Kingdom	1958, 1966, 1967, 1968, 1969, 1970, 1971, 1972, 1973, 1974, 1975	Shared the 1979 Nobel Prize in Physics with St.Weinberg and Sh.L.Glashow (Note: “for their contributions to the theory of the unified weak and electromagnetic interaction between elementary particles, including, inter alia, the prediction of the weak neutral current”)
	Seymour Benzer	October 15, 1921; Bensonhurst, Brooklyn, New York, United States	November 30, 2007; Pasadena, California, United States	1958	Nominated the only time by Ernest C. Pollard.
	Heinz Neuber	November 22, 1906; Stettin, now Poland	November 18, 1989; Bad Wörishofen, Germany	1958	Nominated the only time by Hajimu Ōkubo from Mechanical Engineering Department of Nagoya University.
	Boris Rajewsky	July 17, 1893; Chyhyryn, now Ukraine	November 22, 1974; Frankfurt am Main, Germany	1958	Nominated the only time by Fr.Dessauer.
	Harold Delos Babcock	January 24, 1882; Edgerton, Wisconsin, United States	April 8, 1968; Pasadena, California, United States	1958	Nominated jointly with H.W.Babcock the only time by Al.H.G.Dauvillier
	William Hume-Rothery	May 15, 1899; Worcester Park, United Kingdom	September 27, 1968; Oxford, England	1958	Nominated the only time by G.D.Preston and for the Nobel Prize in Chemistry too.
	Clyde Edward Wiegand	May 23, 1915, Long Beach, Washington, United States	July 5, 1996; Oakland, California, United States	1958	Nominated jointly with Owen Chamberlain and Em.Segrè the only time by M.Verde
	Thomas Ypsilantis	June 24, 1928; Salt Lake City, United States	August 15, 2000; Geneva, Switzerland	1958	Nominated jointly with Owen Chamberlain and Em.Segrè the only time by M.Verde
	David Bohm	December 20, 1917; Wilkes-Barre, Pennsylvania, United States	October 27, 1992; London, United Kingdom	1958	Nominated jointly with D.Pines the only time by Huzio Nakano (1922–2009) from Nagoya University.
	David Pines	June 8, 1924; Kansas City, Missouri, United States	May 3, 2018; Urbana, Illinois, United States	1958, 1968	
	Alfred Landé	December 13, 1888; Elberfeld, German Empire	October 30, 1976; Columbus, Ohio, United States	1958, 1969	Nominated jointly with S.Goudsmit and G.Uhlenbeck by Alfred Kastler only.
	Jesse Beams	December 25, 1898; Belle Plaine, Kansas, United States	July 23, 1977; Charlottesville, Virginia, United States	1958, 1970	
	Victor Frederick Weisskopf	September 19, 1908; Vienna, Austria-Hungary	April 22, 2002; Newton, Massachusetts, United States	1958, 1965, 1967, 1969, 1970, 1971, 1973, 1975	
	Yevgeny Zavoisky	September 28, 1907; Mohyliv-Podilskyi, now Ukraine	October 9, 1976; Moscow, Russia	1958, 1959, 1960, 1961, 1962, 1963, 1964, 1965, 1966, 1968, 1969, 1970, 1971, 1972, 1973, 1974, 1975	Nominated for the Nobel Prize in Chemistry too.
1959
	Donald A. Glaser	September 21, 1926; Cleveland, Ohio, United States	February 28, 2013; Berkeley, California, United States	1959, 1960	Won the 1960 Nobel Prize in Physics (Note: “for the invention of the bubble chamber”)
	Leon M. Lederman	July 15, 1922; New York City, United States	October 3, 2018; Rexburg, Idaho, United States	1959, 1963, 1967, 1969, 1975	Shared the 1988 Nobel Prize in Physics with M.Schwartz and J.Steinberger (Note: “for the neutrino beam method and the demonstration of the doublet structure of the leptons through the discovery of the muon neutrino”)
	Friedrich Dessauer	July 19, 1881; Aschaffenburg, German Empire	February 16, 1963; Frankfurt am Main, Germany	1959	Nominated the only time by H.Schreiber and for the Nobel Prize in Physiology or Medicine too (Note: "The introduction of deep X-ray therapy")
	Abram Ioffe	October 29, 1880; Romny, now Ukraine	October 14, 1960; Leningrad, Russia	1959	Nominated the only time by Fr.X.Eder.
	Charles Kittel	July 18, 1916; New York City, United States	May 15, 2019; Berkeley, California, United States	1959	Nominated the only time by W.Nierenberg.
	Frank Philip Bowden	May 2, 1903; Hobart, Australia	September 3, 1968; Cambridge, United Kingdom	1959	Nominated the only time by L.B.Loeb.
	Nicholas Kemmer	December 7, 1911; Saint Petersburg, Russian Empire	October 21, 1998; Edinburgh, United Kingdom	1959, 1965	
	J. D. Bernal	May 10, 1901; Nenagh, United Kingdom	September 15, 1971; London, United Kingdom	1959, 1966	Nominated for the Nobel Prize in Chemistry too.
	Frederick Charles Frank	March 6, 1911; Durban, South Africa	April 5, 1998; Bristol, United Kingdom	1959, 1961, 1968	
	Norbert Wiener	November 26, 1894; Columbia, Missouri, United States	March 18, 1964; Stockholm, Sweden	1959	Nominated jointly with Cl.Shannon the only time by G. N. Ramachandran.
	Claude Shannon	April 30, 1916; Gaylord, Michigan, United States	February 24, 2001; Medford, Massachusetts, United States	1959, 1967, 1972, 1973	
	Albrecht Unsöld	April 20, 1905; Bolheim, German Empire	September 23, 1995; Kiel, Germany	1959, 1973	
	Carl Wagner	May 25, 1901; Leipzig, German Empire	December 10, 1977; Göttingen, Germany	1959	Nominated jointly with W.H.Schottky the only time by R.Vieweg and for the Nobel Prize in Chemistry too.
	Walter H. Schottky	July 23, 1886; Zürich, Switzerland	March 4, 1976; Pretzfeld, Germany	1959, 1965, 1967, 1973, 1974	Nominated for the Nobel Prize in Chemistry too.
	André Lallemand	September 29, 1904; Cirey-lès-Pontailler, France	March 24, 1978; Paris, France	1959, 1960, 1961, 1962, 1964, 1971, 1974, 1975	
	Bogolyubov, Nikolay Nikolayevich	August 21, 1909; Nizhny Novgorod, Russian Empire	February 13, 1992; Moscow, Russia	1959, 1960, 1963, 1966, 1967, 1968, 1969, 1970, 1971, 1972, 1973, 1974, 1975	Nominated for the Nobel Prize in Chemistry too

=== 1960–1969 ===
Picture	Name	Born	Died	Years Nominated	Notes
1960
	Alexander Prokhorov	July 11, 1916; Peeramon, Queensland, Australia	January 8, 2002; Moscow, Russia	1960, 1962, 1963, 1964	Shared the 1964 Nobel Prize in Physics with Ch.H.Townes
	Nikolay Basov	December 14, 1922; Usman, Russian Empire	July 1, 2001; Moscow, Russia	1960, 1962, 1963, 1964	Shared the 1964 Nobel Prize in Physics with Ch.H.Townes
	Murray Gell-Mann	September 15, 1929; Manhattan, New York City, United States	May 24, 2019; Santa Fe, New Mexico, United States	1960, 1961, 1964, 1965, 1966, 1967, 1968, 1969	Won the 1969 Nobel Prize in Physics (Note: “for his contributions and discoveries concerning the classification of elementary particles and their interactions”)
	Abraham Pais	May 19, 1918; Amsterdam, Netherlands	July 28, 2000; Copenhagen, Denmark	1960, 1968	Nominated jointly with M.Gell-Mann only.
	Nicolaas Bloembergen	March 11, 1920; Dordrecht, Netherlands	September 5, 2017; Tucson, Arizona, United States	1960, 1962, 1963, 1969, 1972, 1973, 1974	Shared the 1981 Nobel Prize in Physics with A.L.Schawlow (Note: “for their contribution to the development of laser spectroscopy”) and K.M.B.Siegbahn.
	Max Perutz	May 19, 1914; Vienna, Austria-Hungary	February 6, 2002; Cambridge, United Kingdom	1960, 1961	Shared the 1962 Nobel Prize in Chemistry
	John Kendrew	March 24, 1917; Oxford, United Kingdom	August 23, 1997; Cambridge, England	1960, 1961	Shared the 1962 Nobel Prize in Chemistry
	Jean Brossel	August 15, 1918; Périgueux, France	February 4, 2003; Périgueux, France	1960, 1965, 1966	Nominated jointly with Alfred Kastler only.
	Albert Overhauser	August 17, 1925; San Diego, California, United States	December 10, 2011; West Lafayette, Indiana, United States	1960, 1963, 1968	Nominated jointly with An.Abragam only.
	Anatole Abragam	December 15, 1914; Griva, now Latvia	June 8, 2011; Paris, France	1960, 1963, 1968, 1970, 1971, 1974, 1975	
	James Van Allen	September 7, 1914; Mount Pleasant, Iowa, United States	August 9, 2006; Iowa City, Iowa, United States	1960, 1961, 1962, 1965, 1967, 1968, 1969, 1970, 1971, 1973, 1974, 1975	
	Kazuhiko Nishijima	October 4, 1926; Tsuchiura, Japan	February 15, 2009; Tokyo, Japan	1960, 1961, 1964, 1966, 1967, 1968, 1969, 1970	
1961
	Tadao Nakano (Japanese: 中野 董夫)	1926; Tokyo, Japan	August 15, 2004; Takatsuki, Japan	1961, 1970	Nominated jointly with K.Nishijima only.
	Rudolf Mössbauer	January 31, 1929; Munich, Germany	September 14, 2011; Grünwald, Bavaria, Germany	1961	Shared the 1961 Nobel Prize in Physics (Note: “for his researches concerning the resonance absorption of gamma radiation and his discovery in this connection of the effect which bears his name”) with R.Hofstadter.
	Leon Cooper	February 28, 1930; Bronx, New York, United States	October 23, 2024; Providence, Rhode Island, U.S.	1961, 1963, 1965, 1966, 1967, 1968, 1969, 1970, 1971, 1972	Shared the 1972 Nobel Prize in Physics with J.Bardeen
	John Robert Schrieffer	May 31, 1931; Oak Park, Illinois, United States	July 27, 2019; Tallahassee, Florida, United States	1961, 1963, 1965, 1966, 1967, 1968, 1969, 1970, 1971, 1972	Shared the 1972 Nobel Prize in Physics with J.Bardeen
	Aage Bohr	June 19, 1922; Copenhagen, Denmark	September 8, 2009; Copenhagen, Denmark	1961, 1965, 1966, 1967, 1968, 1969, 1970, 1971, 1972, 1973, 1974, 1975	Shared the 1975 Nobel Prize in Physics with J.Rainwater (Note: “for the discovery of the connection between collective motion and particle motion in atomic nuclei and the development of the theory of the structure of the atomic nucleus based on this connection”)
	Ben Roy Mottelson	July 9, 1926; Chicago, United States	May 13, 2022; Copenhagen, Denmark	1961, 1965, 1966, 1967, 1968, 1969, 1970, 1971, 1972, 1973, 1974, 1975	Shared the 1975 Nobel Prize in Physics with J.Rainwater
	Louis Harold Gray	November 10, 1905; London Borough of Richmond upon Thames, United Kingdom	July 9, 1965; Northwood, London, England	1961	Nominated the only time by H.E.Johns.
	Ladislaus L. (Bill) Marton	August 15, 1901; Budapest, Austria-Hungary	January 22, 1979; Washington, D.C., United States	1961	Nominated jointly with Ernst Ruska and M.Knoll the only time by D.Gabor.
	Frederick Seitz	July 4, 1911; San Francisco, United States	March 2, 2008; New York City, United States	1961	Nominated jointly with N.Fr.Mott the only time by Kurt Lücke (1921–2001) from RWTH Aachen University.
	Walter Heitler	January 2, 1904; Karlsruhe, German Empire	November 15, 1981; Zollikon, Switzerland	1961, 1962, 1963, 1964, 1965, 1966, 1967, 1969, 1970, 1971, 1973, 1974	Nominated for the Nobel Prize in Chemistry too.
	Egon Orowan	August 2, 1902; Óbuda, Austria-Hungary	August 3, 1989; Cambridge, United Kingdom	1961, 1968, 1970, 1973, 1974	Nominated jointly with G. I. Taylor only
	Michael Polanyi	March 11, 1891; Budapest, Austria-Hungary	February 22, 1976; Northampton, United Kingdom	1961, 1968, 1970, 1973, 1974	Nominated jointly with G. I. Taylor and Egon Orowan only and for the Nobel Prize in Chemistry too.
1962
	Nikolay V. Belov	December 14, 1891; Janów Lubelski, Congress Poland	March 6, 1982; Moscow, Russia	1962	Nominated the only time by his chief A.V.Subnikov and for the Nobel Prize in Chemistry too.
	Bogdan Maglich	August 5, 1928, Sombor, now Serbia	November 25, 2017; Newport Beach, California, United States	1962	Nominated the only time by Sreten Šljivić (1899–1974) from University of Belgrade.
	Reinhold Rudenberg	February 4, 1883; Hannover, German Empire	December 25, 1961; Boston, United States	1962	Posthumously nominated the only time by P.W.Bridgman.
	Francis Bitter	July 22, 1902; Weehawken, New Jersey, United States	July 26, 1967; Cape Cod Hospital, Hyannis, Massachusetts, United States	1962	Nominated jointly with Alfred Kastler and Ch.H.Townes the only time by Fr.Seitz.
	Martin Näbauer	November 1, 1919; Karlsruhe, Germany	September 10, 1962; Munich, Germany	1962	Nominated with R.Doll the only time by W.Meissner. Died before the only chance to be rewarded.
	R.Doll	January 16, 1923; Munich, Germany	April 13, 2018; Munich, Germany	1962, 1963	
	Theodore Maiman	July 11, 1927; Los Angeles, California, United States	May 5, 2007; Vancouver, Canada	1962, 1969	
	Joseph Weber	May 17, 1919; Paterson, New Jersey, United States	September 30, 2000; Pittsburgh, United States	1962, 1963, 1970, 1971, 1973, 1974	
	Marian Danysz	March 17, 1909; Paris, France	February 9, 1983; Warsaw, Poland	1962, 1965, 1967, 1971, 1972, 1973, 1974, 1975	
	Ali Javan	December 26, 1926; Tehran, Iran	September 12, 2016; Los Angeles, California, United States	1962, 1963, 1973, 1975	
1963
	James P. Gordon	March 20, 1928; New York City, United States	June 21, 2013; Manhattan, New York City, United States	1963	Nominated jointly with Ch.H.Townes the only time by G.Bernardini.
	Bernard Lovell	August 31, 1913; Oldland Common, United Kingdom	August 6, 2012; Swettenham, England	1963, 1964, 1965, 1966, 1967, 1968, 1969, 1970, 1971, 1972, 1973, 1974	Nominated jointly with M.Ryle only.
	Martin Ryle	September 27, 1918; Brighton, United Kingdom	October 14, 1984; Cambridge, England	1963, 1964, 1965, 1966, 1967, 1968, 1969, 1970, 1971, 1972, 1973, 1974	Shared the 1974 Nobel Prize in Physics with Ant.Hewish (Note: “for their pioneering research in radio astrophysics: Ryle for his observations and inventions, in particular of the aperture synthesis technique, and Hewish for his decisive role in the discovery of pulsars”).
	Arthur Leonard Schawlow	May 5, 1921; Mount Vernon, New York, United States	April 28, 1999; Palo Alto, California, United States	1963, 1964, 1969	Shared the 1981 Nobel Prize in Physics with N.Bloembergen and K.M.B.Siegbahn
	Melvin Schwartz	November 2, 1932; New York City, United States	August 28, 2006; Twin Falls, Idaho, United States	1963, 1964, 1966, 1967, 1968, 1969, 1971, 1973, 1974, 1975	Shared the 1988 Nobel Prize in Physics with L.M.Lederman (Note: “for the neutrino beam method and the demonstration of the doublet structure of the leptons through the discovery of the muon neutrino”)
	Jack Steinberger	May 25, 1921; Bad Kissingen, Germany	December 12, 2020; Geneva, Switzerland	1963, 1967, 1969, 1971, 1974	Shared the 1988 Nobel Prize in Physics with L.M.Lederman
	Max Delbrück	September 4, 1906; Berlin, German Empire	March 9, 1981; Pasadena, California, United States	1963	Shared the 1969 Nobel Prize in Physiology or Medicine with Alfred Hershey and S.Luria.
	Walter Friedrich	December 25, 1883; Salbke, Magdeburg, German Empire	October 16, 1968; Berlin, Germany	1963	Nominated the only time by Fr.Kirchner.
	Adriano Gozzini	April 13, 1917; Florence, Kingdom of Italy	September 24, 1994; Pisa, Italy	1963, 1965, 1971	Nominated jointly with M.Conversi only.
	William Martin Fairbank	February 24, 1917; Minneapolis, United States	September 30, 1989; Palo Alto, California, United States	1963, 1969, 1970, 1971, 1973	
	Ernest Courant	March 26, 1920; Göttingen, Germany	April 21, 2020; Ann Arbor, United States	1963, 1967, 1971, 1973, 1974, 1975	Jointly nominated only
	Milton Stanley Livingston	May 25, 1905; Brodhead, Wisconsin, United States	August 25, 1986; Santa Fe, New Mexico, United States	1963, 1967, 1971, 1973, 1974, 1975	Jointly nominated only
	Herbert Fröhlich	December 9, 1905; Rexingen, German Empire	January 23, 1991; Liverpool, United Kingdom	1963, 1964, 1966, 1970, 1972, 1975	
1964
	Philip Burton Moon	May 17, 1907; Lewisham, United Kingdom	October 9, 1994; Worcester, England,	1964	Nominated the only time by R.L.Mössbauer.
	Leopold Infeld	August 20, 1898; Kraków, now Poland	January 15, 1968; Warsaw, Poland	1964	Nominated the only time by H.Hönl.
	Keith Edward Bullen	June 29, 1906; Auckland, New Zealand	September 23, 1976; Auckland, New Zealand	1964	Nominated jointly with H.Jeffreys the only time by Al.Zátopek.
	Hermann Schüler	July 24, 1894; Posen, now Poland	July 5, 1964; Göttingen, Germany	1964	Nominated jointly the only time by Karl Walter Kofink (1907–1977) from Karlsruhe Institute of Technology Schüler has died before the only chance to be rewarded
	Theodor Schmidt	July 29, 1908; Düsseldorf, German Empire	December 10, 1986; Sulzburg, Germany	1964	Nominated jointly the only time by Karl Walter Kofink (1907–1977) from Karlsruhe Institute of Technology Schüler has died before the only chance to be rewarded
	Scott Forbush	April 10, 1904; Hudson, Ohio, United States	April 4, 1984; Charlottesville, Virginia, United States	1964, 1968	Nominated by J.Al.Simpson only.
	Edoardo Amaldi	September 5, 1908; Carpaneto Piacentino, Kingdom of Italy	December 5, 1989; Rome, Italy	1964, 1971, 1974	
	Freeman Dyson	December 15, 1923; Crowthorne, United Kingdom	February 28, 2020; Princeton, New Jersey, United States	1964, 1971, 1972, 1973, 1974, 1975	
	William Alfred Fowler	August 9, 1911; Pittsburgh, United States	March 14, 1995; Pasadena, California, United States	1964, 1972, 1973, 1974, 1975	Shared the 1983 Nobel Prize in Physics (Note: “for his theoretical and experimental studies of the nuclear reactions of importance in the formation of the chemical elements in the universe”) with S.Chandrasekhar.
	Geoffrey Burbidge	September 24, 1925; Chipping Norton, United Kingdom	January 26, 2010; La Jolla, California, United States	1964	Nominated jointly with his wife M/Burbidge, W. Alfred Fowler and Fr.Hoyle the only time by H.Cl.Urey
	Margaret Burbidge	August 12, 1919; Davenport, Greater Manchester, United Kingdom	April 5, 2020; San Francisco, United States	1964, 1973	
	Fred Hoyle	June 24, 1915; Gilstead, Bingley, West Riding of Yorkshire, United Kingdom	August 20, 2001; Bournemouth, England	1964, 1965, 1970, 1973	
1965
	Martin Schwarzschild	May 31, 1912; Potsdam, German Empire	April 10, 1997; Langhorne, Pennsylvania, United States	1965, 1975	
	Sybren de Groot	April 18, 1916; Amsterdam, Netherlands	May 9, 1994; Amsterdam, Netherlands	1965	Nominated the only time by H.Ziegler from ETH Zurich.
	Susumu Okubo	March 2, 1930; Tokyo, Japan	July 17, 2015; Rochester, New York, United States	1965	Nominated the only time by R.E.Marshak.
	Jan Volger	November 18, 1919; Haarlem, Netherlands	December 25, 1984	1965	Nominated the only time by Otto Haxel.
	Yoshio Ohnuki	November 7, 1928; Tochigi Prefecture, Japan	February 16, 2026	1965, 1966 (Note: “Nominations 18847&19324 to Yoshio Ohnuki have been hidden at the Nomination Archive site according to § 8 of the statutes governing the Nobel archives of the Royal Swedish Academy of Sciences”)	Nominated jointly with M.Gell-Mann and Y.Ne'eman by G.Sutherland only. (Note: “Data of Y Ohnuki (id 13855) have been hidden at the Nomination Archive site according to § 8 of the statutes governing the Nobel archives of the Royal Swedish Academy of Sciences”)
	Yuval Ne'eman	May 14, 1925; Tel Aviv, Mandatory Palestine	April 26, 2006; Tel Aviv, Israel	1965, 1966, 1967, 1969	Nominated jointly with M.Gell-Mann only
	Nicholas Christofilos	December 16, 1916; Boston, Massachusetts, United States	September 24, 1972; Hayward, California, United States	1965, 1967, 1971	
	Maurice Françon	June 15, 1913; Paris, France	August 11, 1996; Sallanches, France	1965, 1974	
	Robert Hanbury Brown	August 31, 1916; Aruvankadu, India	January 16, 2002; Andover, Hampshire, England	1965, 1966, 1973, 1974	
	Richard Q. Twiss	August 24, 1920; Shimla, India	May 20, 2005; Sydney, Australia	1965, 1966, 1974	Nominated jointly with R.H.Brown only
	Erich Hückel	August 9, 1896, Berlin; Berlin, German Empire	February 16, 1980; Marburg, Germany	1965, 1966, 1969	Nominated for the Nobel Prize in Chemistry too.
	Friedrich Hund	February 4, 1896; Karlsruhe, German Empire	March 31, 1997; Göttingen, Germany	1965, 1969, 1975	Nominated for the Nobel Prize in Chemistry too.
	Jerzy Pniewski	June 1, 1913; Płock, Congress Poland	June 16, 1989; Warsaw, Poland	1965, 1967, 1971, 1972, 1973, 1974, 1975	Nominated jointly with M.Danysz only.
	John Archibald Wheeler	July 9, 1911; Jacksonville, Florida, United States	April 13, 2008; Hightstown, New Jersey, United States	1965, 1967, 1968, 1969, 1970, 1971, 1972, 1973, 1974, 1975	
1966
	Dennis Gabor	June 5, 1900; Budapest, Austria-Hungary	February 9, 1979; London, United Kingdom	1966, 1967, 1968, 1969, 1970, 1971, 1972	Won the 1971 Nobel Prize in Physics (Note: “for his invention and development of the holographic method”) and nominated for the Nobel Prize in Physiology or Medicine too. (Note: "Effects of radiation on cell division ("Zellteilung und Strahlung", Jul. Springer Verlag, Berlin, 1928)")
	James Cronin	September 29, 1931; Chicago, United States	August 25, 2016; Saint Paul, Minnesota, United States	1966, 1967, 1968, 1969, 1970, 1971, 1972, 1973, 1974, 1975	Shared the 1980 Nobel Prize in Physics (Note: “for the discovery of violations of fundamental symmetry principles in the decay of neutral K-mesons”)
	Val Logsdon Fitch	March 10, 1923; Merriman, Nebraska, United States	February 5, 2015; Princeton, New Jersey, United States	1966, 1967, 1968, 1969, 1970, 1971, 1972, 1973, 1974, 1975	Shared the 1980 Nobel Prize in Physics
	Bertram Brockhouse	July 15, 1918; Lethbridge, Alberta, Canada	October 13, 2003; Hamilton, Ontario, Canada	1966, 1969, 1971, 1972, 1974, 1975	Shared the 1994 Nobel Prize in Physics (Note: “for the development of neutron spectroscopy”) with Cl.Shull.
	Maarten Schmidt	December 28, 1929; Groningen, Netherlands	September 17, 2022; Pasadena, California, United States	1966	
	William Brownfield Fowler	March 22, 1924; Owensboro, Kentucky, United States	May 3, 2015; St. Charles, Illinois, United States	1966	Nominated jointly the only time by Th.G.Kouyoumzelis
	Nicholas P. Samios	March 15, 1932; New York City, United States	(aged 94)	1966	Nominated jointly the only time by Th.G.Kouyoumzelis
	Jack Warren Keuffel	May 10, 1919	May 23, 1974; Little Cottonwood Canyon, United States	1966	Nominated jointly the only time by Yozo Nogami (1918–2008) from University of Tokyo
	Thomas Edwin Cranshaw	March 8, 1922; St.Annes-on-Sea, Fylde, United Kingdom	January 14, 2016	1966	Nominated jointly the only time by Yozo Nogami (1918–2008) from University of Tokyo
	Johannes Frederik ("Hannes") de Beer	1930 or 1933	(20 July?) 2021	1966	Nominated jointly the only time by Yozo Nogami (1918–2008) from University of Tokyo
	Shuji Fukui	August 19, 1923; Osaka, Japan	May 4, 2018; Japan	1966	Nominated jointly the only time by Yozo Nogami (1918–2008) from University of Tokyo
	Sigenori Miyamoto	October 20, 1931; Akashi, Hyōgo, Japan	December 31, 2017; Japan	1966	Nominated jointly the only time by Yozo Nogami (1918–2008) from University of Tokyo
	Dan Schneiderman	1922; Baltimore, United States	December 22, 2007; Pasadena, California, United States	1966	Nominated jointly with R.B.Leighton the only time by R.L.F.Boyd
	Richard Kanne Sloan	November 11, 1930; Hockessin, Delaware, United States	(aged 96)	1966	Nominated jointly with R.B.Leighton the only time by R.L.F.Boyd
	J. Denton Allen	May 16, 1934	April 5, 2014; Pasadena, California, United States	1966	Nominated jointly with R.B.Leighton the only time by R.L.F.Boyd
	Bruce C. Murray	November 30, 1931; New York City, United States	August 29, 2013; Oceanside, California, United States	1966	Nominated jointly with R.B.Leighton the only time by R.L.F.Boyd
	Robert P. Sharp	June 24, 1911; Oxnard, California, United States	May 24, 2004; Santa Barbara, California, United States	1966	Nominated jointly with R.B.Leighton the only time by R.L.F.Boyd
	Robert Benjamin Leighton	September 10, 1919; Detroit, United States	March 9, 1997; Pasadena, California, United States	1966, 1970	
	Brian Pippard	September 7, 1920; Earl's Court, London, United Kingdom	September 21, 2008; Cambridge, England	1966, 1970, 1972, 1973	Jointly nominated only
	David Shoenberg	January 4, 1911; Saint Petersburg, Russian Empire	March 10, 2004; Cambridge, United Kingdom	1966, 1970, 1972, 1973	Jointly nominated only
	Fock, Vladimir Aleksandrovich	December 22, 1898; Saint Petersburg, Russian Empire	December 27, 1974; Leningrad, Russia	1966, 1971, 1972, 1973, 1974	
	H. Richard Crane	November 4, 1907; Turlock, California, United States	April 19, 2007; Ann Arbor, Michigan, United States	1966, 1975	
	Jacques Friedel	February 11, 1921; Paris, France	August 27, 2014; Paris, France	1966, 1972, 1975	
	Bernd T. Matthias	June 8, 1918; Frankfurt am Main, German Empire	October 27, 1980; La Jolla, California, United States	1966, 1967, 1969, 1970, 1971, 1972, 1975	Nominated for the Nobel Prize in Chemistry too.
1967
	Vladimir Vladimirovich Belousov	October 30, 1907; Moscow, Russian Empire	December 25, 1990; Moscow, Russia	1967	Nominated the only time by Robert Lauterbach.
	Arnold 'Fritz' Bopp	December 27, 1909; Frankfurt, German Empire	November 14, 1987; Munich, Germany	1967	Nominated the only time by Gerhard Fanselau.
	Stuart Thomas Butler	July 4, 1926; Naracoorte, South Australia, Australia	May 15, 1982; Lucas Heights, New South Wales, Australia	1967	Nominated the only time by Joseph Lafoucrière (1918–2008) from Lyon.
	James Stanley Hey	May 3, 1909; Nelson, Lancashire, United Kingdom	February 27, 2000	1967	Nominated jointly with Gr.Reber the only time by Satya Narayan from Hyderabad.
	Albert Rose	March 30, 1910; New York City, United States	July 26, 1990; Princeton, New Jersey, United States	1967	Nominated jointly the only time by Georges Asch (1931–2018) from the University Lyon 1
	Murray Alfred Lampert	November 29, 1921; New York City, United States	August 4, 1988; Princeton, New Jersey, United States	1967	Nominated jointly the only time by Georges Asch (1931–2018) from the University Lyon 1
	Edward Uhler Condon	March 2, 1902; Alamogordo, New Mexico, United States	March 26, 1974; Boulder, Colorado, United States	1967	Nominated jointly with J.R.Oppenheimer and G.Gamow the only time by Alb.All.Bartlett.
	Rudolf Hilsch	December 18, 1903; Hamburg, German Empire	May 29, 1972; Göttingen, Germany	1967	Nominated jointly with R.W.Pohl and W.H.Schottky the only time by Hans-Ulrich Harten (1920–1998) from the University of Göttingen.
	Gerhart Lüders	February 25, 1920; Hamburg, Germany	January 31, 1995; Göttingen, Germany	1967	Nominated the only time by F.Fr.Cap. (Note: “Data of Gerhart Lüders (id 15060) have been hidden at the Nomination Archive site”)
	Cormac Ó Ceallaigh	July 29, 1912; Dublin, United Kingdom of Great Britain and Ireland	October 10, 1996; Dublin, Ireland	1967	Nominated jointly with Louis Leprince-Ringuet the only time by F.Fr.Cap. (Note: “Data of Cormac Ó Ceallaigh (id 14496) have been hidden at the Nomination Archive site”)
	Rafael Armenteros	1922	March 5, 2004	1967	Nominated jointly with Cl.Ch.Butler and G.D.Rochester the only time by F.Fr.Cap. (Note: “Data of Rafael Armenteros (id 15061) have been hidden at the Nomination Archive site”)
	Gordon Thompson Danby	November 8, 1929; Richmond, Ontario, Canada	August 2, 2016; Stony Brook, New York, United States	1967	Nominated jointly with co-workers the only time by F.Fr.Cap. (Note: “Data of Danby (id 15065) have been hidden at the Nomination Archive site”)
	Isaak Yakovlevich Pomeranchuk	May 20, 1913; Warsaw, Congress Poland	December 14, 1966; Moscow, Russia	1967	Posthumously nominated jointly with G.F.Chew the only time by F.Fr.Cap. (Note: “Data of Isaak Pomeranchuk (id 14495) have been hidden at the Nomination Archive site”)
	Geoffrey Foucar Chew	June 5, 1924; Washington, D.C., United States	April 12, 2019; Berkeley, California, United States	1967, 1972, 1974, 1975	
	Hermann Julius Oberth	June 25, 1894; Nagyszeben (Hermannstadt), now Romania	December 28, 1989; Nuremberg, Germany	1967, 1971, 1972	
	Tullio Eugenio Regge	July 11, 1931; Borgo d'Ale, Kingdom of Italy	October 23, 2014; Orbassano, Italy	1967, 1973	
	Marvin Leonard "Murph" Goldberger	October 22, 1922; Chicago, United States	November 26, 2014; La Jolla, United States	1967, 1972, 1973, 1974	
	Raimond Castaing	December 28, 1921; Monaco	April 10, 1998; Clamart, France	1967, 1972, 1974, 1975	Nominated for the Nobel Prize in Chemistry too
	Hartmut Kallmann	February 5, 1896; Berlin, German Empire	June 11, 1978; Munich, Germany	1967, (Note: “Nominations 19899 & 19900 to Hartmut Kallmann have been hidden at the Nomination Archive site”) 1975	(Note: “Data of Hartmut Kallmann (id 14441) have been hidden at the Nomination Archive site”)
	Harrie Stewart Wilson Massey	May 16, 1908; Invermay, Victoria, Australia	November 27, 1983; Esher, United Kingdom	1967, 1969, 1973, 1974, 1975	
	Rudolf Ernst Peierls	June 5, 1907; Berlin, German Empire	September 19, 1995; Oxford, United Kingdom	1967, 1969, 1970, 1971, 1972, 1973, 1974, 1975	
	Bruno Pontecorvo	August 22, 1913; Marina di Pisa, Kingdom of Italy	September 24, 1993; Dubna, Russia	1967, 1975	Nominated jointly with M.Schwartz only.
	David Warren Turner	July 16, 1927; Leigh-on-Sea, United Kingdom	(aged 99)	1967, 1968, probably 1969&1970 (Note: “Nominations 19928&20219 and probably 20679&20800 to David Warren Turner have been hidden at the Nomination Archive site according to § 8 of the statutes governing the Nobel archives of the Royal Swedish Academy of Sciences”), 1975	Nominated for the Nobel Prize in Chemistry too (Note: “Data of David Warren Turner (id 14450) have been hidden at the Nomination Archive site according to § 8 of the statutes governing the Nobel archives of the Royal Swedish Academy of Sciences”)
1968
	Leo Esaki	March 12, 1925; Takaida-mura, Nakakawachi-gun, Osaka Prefecture, Japan	(aged 101)	1968, (Note: “Nomination 20252 and following ones have been hidden at the Nomination Archive site according to § 8 of the statutes governing the Nobel archives of the Royal Swedish Academy of Sciences”) 1971, 1972, 1973	(Note: “Data of Leo Esaki (id 14575) have been hidden at the Nomination Archive site according to § 8 of the statutes governing the Nobel archives of the Royal Swedish Academy of Sciences”) Shared the 1973 Nobel Prize in Physics (Note: “for their experimental discoveries regarding tunneling phenomena in semiconductors and superconductors, respectively”) (Note: “Data of I Giaever (id 14755) have been hidden at the Nomination Archive site according to § 8 of the statutes governing the Nobel archives of the Royal Swedish Academy of Sciences”) (Note: “for his theoretical predictions of the properties of a supercurrent through a tunnel barrier, in particular those phenomena which are generally known as the Josephson effects”) (Note: “Data of Brian David Josephson (id 14577) have been hidden at the Nomination Archive site according to § 8 of the statutes governing the Nobel archives of the Royal Swedish Academy of Sciences”)
	Ivar Giaever	April 5, 1929; Bergen, Norway	June 20, 2025; Schenectady, New York, United States	1968, 1971, 1972, 1973	Shared the 1973 Nobel Prize in Physics
	Brian Josephson	January 4, 1940; Cardiff, United Kingdom	(aged 86)	1968, 1969, 1970, 1971, 1972, 1973 (Note: “All nominations with Br.Josephson have been hidden at the Nomination Archive site according to § 8 of the statutes governing the Nobel archives of the Royal Swedish Academy of Sciences”)	Shared the 1973 Nobel Prize in Physics
	Robert Edward Bell	November 29, 1918; New Malden, United Kingdom	April 1, 1992; Vancouver, Canada	1968	Nominated the only time by Nalini Kanta Saha (1908–199?) from the Delhi University.
	William Ellsworth Gifford	June 20, 1919; Cleveland, United States	1980; Syracuse, New York, United States	1968	Nominated the only time by Osmund Dorenfeldt Jenssen (1923–2009) from University of Trondheim.
	John Eugene Kunzler	April 25, 1923; Willard, Utah, United States	January 11, 2006; Port Murray, New Jersey, United States	1968	Nominated the only time by P.E.Duwez from Caltech.
	Hiroomi Umezawa	September 20, 1924; Kurihashi, Saitama, Japan	March 24, 1995; Edmonton, Alberta, Canada	1968	Nominated the only time by Ed.R.Caianiello and nominated for the Nobel Prize in Chemistry too
	Sergei Vernov	July 11, 1910; Sestroretsk, Russian Empire	May 29, 1972; Moscow, Russia	1968	Nominated jointly with H.Alfvén, S.Chapman and J.Alfr.Van Allen the only time by L.Harang.
	Herman Francis Mark	May 3, 1895; Vienna, Austria	April 6, 1992; Austin, Texas, United States	1968, 1970, 1972, 1973	Nominated by R.Robinson only and for the Nobel Prize in Chemistry too.
	Gerhard Borrmann	April 30, 1908; Diedenhofen, now France	April 12, 2006; Braunfels, Germany	1968	Nominated jointly with P.P.Ewald the only time by G.Leibfried.
	Paul Peter Ewald	January 23, 1888; Berlin, German Empire	August 22, 1985; Ithaca, New York, United States	1968, 1970, 1974, 1975	
	Jeffrey Goldstone	September 3, 1933; Manchester, United Kingdom	October 12, 2026	1968 (Note: “Nominations 20234, 20701&20827 to Jeffrey Goldstone have been hidden at the Nomination Archive site according to § 8 of the statutes governing the Nobel archives of the Royal Swedish Academy of Sciences”), 1969, 1970	(Note: “Data of Jeffrey Goldstone (id 14564) have been hidden at the Nomination Archive site according to § 8 of the statutes governing the Nobel archives of the Royal Swedish Academy of Sciences”) Nominated by W.Heisenberg only
	Hans-Peter Dürr	October 7, 1929; Stuttgart, Germany	May 18, 2014; Munich, Germany	1968, 1969, 1970, 1974, 1975	Nominated by W.Heisenberg only
	Robert Henry Dicke	May 6, 1916; St. Louis, Missouri, United States	March 4, 1997; Princeton, New Jersey, United States	1968, 1969, 1971, 1974, 1975	
	Gaston Dupouy	August 7, 1900; Marmande, France	October 22, 1985; Toulouse, France	1968, 1975	
	George J. Schulz	April 29, 1925; Brno, now Czechia	January 15, 1976; New Haven, Connecticut, United States	1968, 1975	Nominated for the Nobel Prize in Chemistry too
	John Clarke Slater	December 22, 1900; Oak Park, Illinois, United States	July 25, 1976; Sanibel Island, Florida, United States	1968, 1969, 1970, 1971, 1972, 1973, 1974, 1975	Nominated for the Nobel Prize in Chemistry too.
	Ivar Waller	June 11, 1898; Flen, Sweden	April 12, 1991; Uppsala, Sweden	1968, 1971, 1973, 1975	Nominated jointly with C.J.Gorter only.
	Konrad Ernst Otto Zuse	June 22, 1910; Wilmersdorf, German Empire	December 18, 1995; Hünfeld, Germany	1968, 1975	
1969
	Jens Lindhard	February 26, 1922; Tystofte, Tjæreby Sogn, Denmark	October 17, 1997	1969	Nominated the only time by M.F.Yeniçay.
	Reginald Charles Rainey	June 18, 1913; Gosport, United Kingdom	January 18, 1990	1969	Nominated the only time by R.S.Scorer.
	Nicola Cabibbo	April 10, 1935; Rome, Kingdom of Italy	August 16, 2010; Rome, Italy	1969	Nominated jointly with M.Gell-Mann the only time by M.J.G.Veltman.
	Jacob G. Dorfman	March 26, 1898; Saint Petersburg, Russian Empire	November 5, 1976; Leningrad, Russia	1969	Nominated jointly with Ye.K.Zavoisky the only time by Yu.B.Khariton.
	Eugene Newman Parker	June 10, 1927; Houghton, Michigan, United States	March 15, 2022; Chicago, United States	1969	Nominated jointly with H.Ol.G.Alfvén and J.Alfr.Van Allen the only time by D.W.Kerst.
	Emmett Norman Leith	March 12, 1927; Detroit, United States	December 23, 2005; Ann Arbor, Michigan, United States	1969	Nominated jointly with D.Gabor the only time by Günther Porod
	Juris Upatnieks	May 7, 1936; Riga, Latvia	May 17, 2026	1969	Nominated jointly with D.Gabor the only time by Günther Porod
	Feza Gürsey	April 7, 1921; Istanbul, Turkey	April 13, 1992; New Haven, Connecticut, United States	1969	Nominated jointly with M.Gell-Mann the only time by Ahmet İhsan Özdogan (1913–1993) from the Department of Geophysical Engineering of Istanbul University
	Luigi Arialdo Radicati di Brozolo	October 12, 1919; Milan, Kingdom of Italy	August 23, 2019; Pisa, Italy	1969	Nominated jointly with M.Gell-Mann the only time by Ahmet İhsan Özdogan (1913–1993) from the Department of Geophysical Engineering of Istanbul University
	Sven Algot Joel Liljendahl	June 12, 1912; Halland County, Sweden	2000	1969	Nominated jointly with Jens Leif Løkka (1913–1980) from Mysen, Norway and K Kondō the only time by Osm.D.Jenssen (Note: Osmund Dorenfeldt Jenssen (1923–2009) from the University of Trondheim)
	Jens Leif Løkka	July 1, 1913	1980	1969, 1970	Nominated by Osm.D.Jenssen only.
	Robert William Terhune	February 7, 1926; Detroit, United States	November 20, 2014; Blacksburg, Virginia, United States	1969	Nominated jointly with P.A.Franken the only time by Gianfranco Chiarotti (1928–2017) from the Sapienza University of Rome
	Joseph Anthony Giordmaine	April 10, 1933; Toronto, Canada	(aged 93)	1969	Nominated jointly with P.A.Franken the only time by Gianfranco Chiarotti (1928–2017) from the Sapienza University of Rome
	Peter Alden Franken	November 10, 1928; New York, United States	March 11, 1999; Tucson, Arizona, United States	1969, 1972	
	Georgy Nikolayevich Flerov	March 2, 1913; Rostov-on-Don, Russian Empire	November 19, 1990; Moscow, Russia	1969, 1970, 1972	Nominated for the Nobel Prize in Chemistry too.
	Pierre Jacquinot	January 18, 1910; Frouard, France	September 22, 2002; Paris, France	1969, 1972, 1973	
	Jun Kondō	February 6, 1930; Tokyo, Japan	March 11, 2022; Suginami, Japan	1969, 1972, 1974	
	CERN	Established in 1954; Geneva, Switzerland		1969, 1975	
	John Battiscombe "J. B." Gunn	May 13, 1928; Cairo, Egypt	December 2, 2008; Mount Kisco, New York, United States	1969, 1975	

=== 1970–1976 ===
Picture	Name	Born	Died	Years Nominated	Notes
1970
	Antony Hewish	May 11, 1924; Fowey, United Kingdom	September 13, 2021	1970, 1971, 1972, 1973, 1974	Shared the 1974 Nobel Prize in Physics with M.Ryle
	Dame Susan Jocelyn Bell Burnell	July 15, 1943; Lurgan, United Kingdom	(aged 83)	1970, 1972 (Note: “Nominations 20866 and 22382 are hidden at the Nomination Archive site according to § 8 of the statutes governing the Nobel archives of the Royal Swedish Academy of Sciences”)	(Note: “Data of Jocelyn Bell (id 16371) are hidden at the Nomination Archive site according to § 8 of the statutes governing the Nobel archives of the Royal Swedish Academy of Sciences”)
	Arno Allan Penzias	April 26, 1933; Munich, Germany	January 22, 2024; San Francisco, United States	1970, 1974, 1975	Shared the 1978 Nobel Prize in Physics (Note: “for their discovery of cosmic microwave background radiation”) with P.L.Kapitsa
	Robert Woodrow Wilson	January 10, 1936; Houston, Texas, United States	(aged 90)	1970, 1974	Shared the 1978 Nobel Prize in Physics with P.L.Kapitsa
	Kai Manne Börje Siegbahn	April 20, 1918; Lund, Sweden	July 20, 2007; Ängelholm, Sweden	1970, 1971, 1973, 1974, 1975	Shared the 1981 Nobel Prize in Physics (Note: “for his contribution to the development of high-resolution electron spectroscopy”) with N.Bloembergen and A.L.Schawlow and nominated for the Nobel Prize in Chemistry too.
	Carl Nordling	February 6, 1931	April 1, 2016	1970, 1974	Nominated jointly with K.M.B.Siegbahn only by Gunnar Bäckström from the Umeå University and nominated for the Nobel Prize in Chemistry too.
	Alexei Alexeyevich Abrikosov	June 25, 1928; Moscow, Russia	March 29, 2017; Palo Alto, United States	1970 (Note: “Nomination 20810 (with Br.Josephson) is hidden at the Nomination Archive site according to § 8 of the statutes governing the Nobel archives of the Royal Swedish Academy of Sciences”), 1971, 1974, 1975	Shared the 2003 Nobel Prize in Physics with V.L.Ginzburg and Anth.J.Leggett (Note: “for pioneering contributions to the theory of superconductors and superfluids”)
	Paul Gaston Bastien	May 26, 1907; Fontenay-le-Comte, France	April 26, 1982; Paris, France	1970	Nominated the only time by G.Homès from Brussels.
	Edward Teller	January 15, 1908; Budapest, Austria-Hungary	September 9, 2003; Stanford, California, United States	1970	Nominated the only time by Or.Piccioni and for the Nobel Prize in Chemistry too.
	Albert Ghiorso	July 15, 1915; Vallejo, California, United States	December 26, 2010; Berkeley, California, United States	1970	Nominated jointly with G.N.Flerov the only time by H.Hulubei.
	Johannes (Jan) Martinus Burgers	January 13, 1895; Arnhem, Netherlands	June 7, 1981; Washington, D.C., United States	1970	Nominated jointly with Eg.Orowan and G.I.Taylor the only time by Fr.Ch.Frank.
	Shoichi Sakata	January 18, 1911; Tokyo, Japan	October 16, 1970; Nagoya, Japan	1970	Nominated jointly with Tadao Nakano and K.Nishijima the only time by H.Yukawa.
	Charles Brian Anthony McCusker	February 24, 1919; Stockton-on-Tees, United Kingdom	2001	1970	Nominated jointly with N.N.Bogolyubov, G.N.Flerov and J.Weber the only time by F.Fr.Cap.
	Janine Connes	May 19, 1926 or 1934; Dijon, France	November 28, 2024; Orsay, France	1970	Nominated jointly with her husband P.Connes and R.B.Leighton the only time by R.Wildt
	Pierre Connes	June 28, 1928; Paris, France	February 22, 2019; Orsay, France	1970, 1971, 1973	
	Ralph de Laer Kronig	March 10, 1904; Dresden, German Empire	November 16, 1995; Zeist, Netherlands	1970, 1973	
	Oskar Benjamin Klein	September 15, 1894; Mörby, Sweden	February 5, 1977; Stockholm, Sweden	1970, 1971, 1972, 1973, 1974, 1975	
	Ryogo Kubo	February 15, 1920; Tokyo, Japan	March 31, 1995; Japan	1970, 1973, 1974, 1975	Nominated for the Nobel Prize in Chemistry too
	Fredrik William Houlder "Willie" Zachariasen	February 5, 1906; Langesund, Norway	December 24, 1979; Santa Fe, New Mexico, United States	1970, 1975	Nominated by B.T.Matthias.
1971
	Hersz Georges Charpak	August 1, 1924; Dąbrowica, Wołyń, then Poland	September 29, 2010; Paris, France	1971 (Note: “Nomination 21881 is hidden at the Nomination Archive site according to § 8 of the statutes governing the Nobel archives of the Royal Swedish Academy of Sciences”)	Awarded the 1992 Nobel Prize in Physics (Note: "for his invention and development of particle detectors, in particular the multiwire proportional chamber") (Note: “Data of Georges Charpak (id 16006) are hidden at the Nomination Archive site according to § 8 of the statutes governing the Nobel archives of the Royal Swedish Academy of Sciences”)
	Yoichiro Nambu	January 18, 1921; Tokyo, Empire of Japan	July 5, 2015; Toyonaka, Osaka, Japan	1971, 1975	Shared the 2008 Nobel Prize in Physics (Note: "for the discovery of the mechanism of spontaneous broken symmetry in subatomic physics") with M.Kobayashi and T.Maskawa
	John Joseph Hopfield	July 15, 1933; Chicago, Illinois, United States	(aged 93)	1971 (Note: “Nomination 21904 is hidden at the Nomination Archive site according to § 8 of the statutes governing the Nobel archives of the Royal Swedish Academy of Sciences”)	Shared the 2024 Nobel Prize in Physics (Note: "for foundational discoveries and inventions that enable machine learning with artificial neural networks") with G.Hinton (Note: “Data of John Hopfield (id 16022) are hidden at the Nomination Archive site according to § 8 of the statutes governing the Nobel archives of the Royal Swedish Academy of Sciences”)
	David Gilbert Thomas	August 4, 1928; London, England, United Kingdom	May 9, 2015; Torrington, Connecticut, United States	1971	(Note: “Data of David Gilbert Thomas (id 16023) are hidden at the Nomination Archive site according to § 8 of the statutes governing the Nobel archives of the Royal Swedish Academy of Sciences”)
	Mohamed Abdel Maksoud El-Nadi	Januaty 27, 1918; Samannud, Egypt	2001 (?)	1971 (Note: “Nomination 21837 is hidden at the Nomination Archive site according to § 8 of the statutes governing the Nobel archives of the Royal Swedish Academy of Sciences”)	
	David Buhl	November 20, 1936; Newark, New Jersey, United States	(aged 90)	1971 (Note: “Nomination 21880 is hidden at the Nomination Archive site according to § 8 of the statutes governing the Nobel archives of the Royal Swedish Academy of Sciences”)	(Note: “Data of David Buhl (id 16003) are hidden at the Nomination Archive site according to § 8 of the statutes governing the Nobel archives of the Royal Swedish Academy of Sciences”) Nominated jointly by Fr.Br.Wood (Note: “Data of Lewis Snyder (id 16004) are hidden at the Nomination Archive site according to § 8 of the statutes governing the Nobel archives of the Royal Swedish Academy of Sciences”)
	Lewis (Lew) Snyder	November 26, 1939; Fort Wayne, Indiana, United States	February 3, 2021	1971	Nominated jointly by Fr.Br.Wood
	Bernard Gregory	January 19, 1919; Bergerac, France	December 24, 1977; Élancourt, France	1971	Nominated jointly the only time by L.Leprince-Ringuet
	Charles Peyrou	May 18, 1918; Oloron-Sainte-Marie, France	April 6, 2003	1971	Nominated jointly the only time by L.Leprince-Ringuet
	Arthur Strong Wightman	March 30, 1922; Rochester, New York, United States	January 13, 2013; Edison, New Jersey, United States	1971	Nominated jointly with N.N.Bogolyubov only
	Тяпкин, Алексей Алексеевич	December 26, 1926; Moscow, Russian Federation	November 10, 2003	1971	Nominated jointly with M.Conversi and Adr.Gozzini only
	Zeldovich, Yakov Borisovich	March 8, 1914; Minsk, Belarus, Russian Empire	December 2, 1987; Moscow, Russian Federation	1971	Nominated jointly with M.Schmidt and J.A.Wheeler the only time by Vladimir Vanysek (8.8.1926, Prague - 27.7.1997) from the Charles University and for the Nobel Prize in Chemistry too
	Bengt Georg Daniel Strömgren	January 21, 1908; Gothenburg, Sweden	July 4, 1987; Copenhagen, Denmark	1971	Nominated jointly with V.A.Ambartsumian and J.H.Oort only
	Ambartsumian, Viktor; Amazaspovich	September 18, 1908; Tbilisi, Georgia, Russian Empire	August 12, 1996; Byurakan, Armenia	1971, 1972	
	Wernher Magnus Maximilian Freiherr von Braun	March 23, 1912; Wirsitz, Posen, Prussia, German Empire	June 16, 1977; Alexandria, Virginia, United States	1971, 1973	
	Max Christian Theodor Steenbeck	March 21, 1904; Kiel, Schleswig-Holstein, Germany	December 15, 1981; Berlin, Germany	1971, 1973	
	Robert Rathbun Wilson	March 4, 1914; Frontier, Wyoming, United States	January 16, 2000; Ithaca, New York, United States	1971, 1974	
	James Harlowe Christenson	February 24, 1937	(aged 89)	1971, (Note: “Nomination 22763 is hidden at the Nomination Archive site according to § 8 of the statutes governing the Nobel archives of the Royal Swedish Academy of Sciences”) 1973, 1975	(Note: “Data of James Harlowe Christenson (id 16606) are hidden at the Nomination Archive site according to § 8 of the statutes governing the Nobel archives of the Royal Swedish Academy of Sciences”)
	Albert Victor Crewe	February 18, 1927; Bradford, England	November 18, 2009; Chesterton, Indiana, United States	1971, 1975	
	Paul Buford Price	November 8, 1932; Memphis, Tennessee, United States	December 28, 2021	1971, 1975	Jointly nominated only
	Robert M. Walker	February 6, 1929; Philadelphia, Pennsylvania, United States	February 12, 2004; Brussels, Belgium	1971, 1975	Jointly nominated only
	John Charles Wheatley	February 17, 1927; Tucson, Arizona, United States	May 10, 1986; Los Angeles, United States	1971, 1975	
1972
	Ginzburg, Vitaly Lazarevich	October 4, 1916; Moscow, Russian Empire	November 8, 2009; Moscow, Russian Federation	1972, 1975	Shared the 2003 Nobel Prize in Physics with A.A.Abrikosov and A.J.Leggett
	William (Bill) Cochran	July 30, 1922; Scotland	August 28, 2003	1972	Nominated the only time by Heinz Kurt Henisch
	Willi Dansgaard	August 30, 1922; Copenhagen, Denmark	January 8, 2011; Copenhagen, Denmark	1972	Nominated the only time by Arne Noe-Nygaard (1908-1991) from the University of Copenhagen
	Emanuel, Nikolay Markovich	October 1, 1915; Tim, Kursk Governorate, Russian Empire	December 7, 1984; Chernogolovka, Moscow Oblast, Russian Federation	1972	Nominated by R.G.W.Norrish the only time and for the Nobel Prize in Chemistry too
	Harrison (Harry) Edward Farnsworth	March 24, 1896; Green Lake, Wisconsin, United States	November 14, 1989; Tucson, Arizona, United States	1972	Nominated the only time by Erw.W.Müller
	Glenn M. Frye, Jr.	April 20, 1926; Ithaca, Michigan, United States	January, 2007	1972	Nominated the only time by Victor David Hopper (1913 - 2005) from University of Melbourne
	Chushiro Hayashi	July 25, 1920; Kyoto, Japan	February 28, 2010; Kyoto, Japan	1972	Nominated the only time by H.Maeda
	Franco Dino Rasetti	August 10, 1901; Castiglione del Lago, Italy	December 5, 2001; Waremme, Belgium	1972	
	Alan Walsh	December 19, 1916; Hoddlesden, England	August 3, 1998; Melbourne, Australia	1972	Nominated the only time by Robert Street and for the Nobel Prize in Chemistry too
	Gian Carlo Wick	October 15, 1909; Turin, Kingdom of Italy	April 20, 1992; Turin, Italy	1972	Nominated the only time by Bernard Grossetête (1938-1993) from Orsay
	John Stewart Bell	July 28, 1928; Belfast, Northern Ireland, United Kingdom	October 1, 1990; Geneva, Switzerland	1972	Nominated jointly with N.N.Bogolyubov the only time by B.d'Espagnat
	Philip McCord Morse	August 6, 1903; Shreveport, Louisiana, United States	September 5, 1985; Concord, Massachusetts, United States	1972	Nominated jointly with Erw.W.Müller the only time by Eugen J. Skudrzyk (1913-1990) from the Penn State
	Thomas Gold	May 22, 1920; Vienna, Austria	June 20, 2004; Ithaca, New York, United States	1972 (Note: “Nomination 22382 is hidden at the Nomination Archive site according to § 8 of the statutes governing the Nobel archives of the Royal Swedish Academy of Sciences”)	(Note: “Data of Thomas Gold (id 16372) are hidden at the Nomination Archive site according to § 8 of the statutes governing the Nobel archives of the Royal Swedish Academy of Sciences”) Nominated jointly (Note: “Data of George Michael Volkoff (id 16373) are hidden at the Nomination Archive site according to § 8 of the statutes governing the Nobel archives of the Royal Swedish Academy of Sciences”)
	George Michael Volkoff	February 23, 1914; Moscow, Russia	April 24, 2000; Vancouver, Canada	1972	Nominated jointly
	Stanley Mandelstam	December 12, 1928; Johannesburg, South Africa	June 23, 2016; Berkeley, California, United States	1972	Nominated jointly with G.F.Chew and M.L.Goldberger the only time by Masao Sugawara (1925-2010) from the Purdue University
	James Maxwell Bardeen	May 9, 1939; Minneapolis, Minnesota, United States	June 20, 2022; Seattle, Washington, United States	1972 (Note: “Data of James Maxwell Bardeen (id 16387) are hidden at the Nomination Archive site according to § 8 of the statutes governing the Nobel archives of the Royal Swedish Academy of Sciences”)	
	Peter Berners Fellgett	April 11, 1922; Ipswich, England	November 15, 2008	1972, 1973	Nominated jointly with P.Jacquinot only
	Per-Olov Löwdin	October 28, 1916; Uppsala, Sweden	October 6, 2000; Uppsala, Sweden	1972, 1973	
	Kadomtsev, Boris Borisovich	November 9, 1928; Jarkent, Russian Empire	August 19, 1998; Moscow, Russian Federation	1972, 1974	Nominated jointly with M.N.Rosenbluth only
	Marshall Nicholas Rosenbluth	February 5, 1927; Albany, New York, United States	September 28, 2003; San Diego, California, United States	1972, 1974, 1975	
	Ernst Carl Gerlach Stueckelberg	February 1, 1905; Basel, Switzerland	September 4, 1984; Geneva, Switzerland	1972, 1974, 1975	
	Léon Charles Prudent Van Hove	February 10, 1924; Brussels, Belgium	September 2, 1990; Geneva, Switzerland	1972, 1975	
1973
	Kenneth Geddes "Ken" Wilson	June 8, 1936; Waltham, Massachusetts, United States	June 15, 2013; Saco, Maine, United States	1973, 1974, 1975	Won the 1982 Nobel Prize in Physics (Note: "for his theory for critical phenomena in connection with phase transitions")
	Norman Foster Ramsey Jr.	August 27, 1915; Washington, D.C., United States	November 4, 2011; Wayland, Massachusetts, United States	1973, 1975	Shared the 1989 Nobel Prize in Physics (Note: "for the invention of the separated oscillatory fields method and its use in the hydrogen maser and other atomic clocks") with H.G.Dehmelt and W.Paul
	Raymond Davis Jr.	October 14, 1914; Washington, D.C., United States	May 31, 2006; Blue Point, New York, United States	1973	Shared the 2002 Nobel Prize in Physics with M.Koshiba (Note: "for pioneering contributions to astrophysics, in particular for the detection of cosmic neutrinos") and R.Giacconi
	James Watson	April 6, 1928; Chicago, United States	November 6, 2025; East Northport, New York, United States	1973	Shared the 1962 Nobel Prize in Physiology or Medicine and nominated for the Nobel Prize in Chemistry too
	Francis Crick	June 8, 1916; Weston Favell, England	July 28, 2004; San Diego, United States	1973	Shared the 1962 Nobel Prize in Physiology or Medicine and nominated for the Nobel Prize in Chemistry too
	Maurice Wilkins	December 15, 1916; Pongaroa, New Zealand	October 5, 2004; London, England	1973	Shared the 1962 Nobel Prize in Physiology or Medicine and nominated for the Nobel Prize in Chemistry too
	Herbert Aaron Hauptman	February 14, 1917; New York City, United States	October 23, 2011; Buffalo, New York, United States	1973	Shared the 1985 Nobel Prize in Chemistry
	Jerome Karle	June 18, 1918; New York, New York, United States	June 6, 2013; Annandale, Virginia, United States	1973	Shared the 1985 Nobel Prize in Chemistry
	Isabella Helen Karle (née Lugoski)	December 2, 1921; Detroit, Michigan, United States	October 3, 2017; Alexandria, Virginia, United States	1973	Nominated jointly with J.Karle and H.A.Hauptman the only time by Hans Wondratschek
	Michael Mark Woolfson	January 9, 1927	December 23, 2019	1973	Nominated jointly with J.Karle and H.A.Hauptman the only time by Hans Wondratschek
	James Daniel "BJ" Bjorken	June 22, 1934; Chicago, Illinois, United States	August 6, 2024; Redwood City, California, United States	1973	Nominated the only time by Darrell James Drickey (1934-1974) from UCLA
	Edward Crisp Bullard	September 21, 1907; Norwich, Norfolk, England	April 3, 1980; La Jolla, California, United States	1973	Nominated the only time by Vemu Lakshminarayana Subrahman Bhimasankaram (1931-2021) from the Osmania University
	Richard Henry Dalitz	February 28, 1925; Norwich, Dimboola, Australia	January 13, 2006; Oxford, England, UK	1973	Nominated the only time by J.Pniewski
	Raymond George Herb	January 22, 1908; Navarino, Wisconsin, United States	October 1, 1996	1973	Nominated the only time by Zdzisław Wilhelmi (1921-2013)
	Willibald Jentschke	December 6, 1911; Vienna, Austria-Hungary	March 11, 2002; Göttingen, Germany	1973	Nominated the only time by G.C.Stetter
	Don Kirkham	February 11, 1908; Provo, Utah, United States	March 7, 1998; Ames, Iowa, United States	1973	Nominated the only time by Daniel Joseph Zaffarano (1917-2004) from the Iowa State
	Otto Kratky	March 9, 1902; Vienna, Austria-Hungary	February 11, 1995; Graz, Austria	1973	Nominated for the Nobel Prize in Chemistry too
	Michael James Lighthill	January 27, 1924; Paris, France	July 17, 1998; Sark, Channel Islands	1973	Nominated the only time by J."Shôn"E.Ff.Williams
	Walter Charles Marshall, Baron Marshall of Goring	March 5, 1932; Rumney, Cardiff, UK	February 20, 1996; London, England, UK	1973	Nominated the only time by Michael J. Higatsberger
	Karl Raimund Popper	July 28, 1902; Vienna, Austria-Hungary	September 17, 1994; London, England, UK	1973	Nominated the only time by P.Cl.Thonemann
	Ronald Samuel Rivlin	May 6, 1915; London, England, UK	October 4, 2005; Palo Alto, California, United States	1973	Nominated the only time by A.J.M.Spencer
	Samuel Tolansky (born Turlausky)	November 17, 1906; Newcastle-upon-Tyne, England, UK	March 4, 1973	1973	Nominated the only time by Ernest Hirschlaff Hutten (1908-1996)
	Artsimovich, Lev Andreyevich	February 25, 1909; Moscow, Russian Empire	March 1, 1973; Moscow, Russian Federation	1973	
	Allan Verne Cox	December 17, 1926; Santa Ana, California, United States	January 27, 1987; Palo Alto, California, United States	1973 (Note: “Nomination 22697 is hidden at the Nomination Archive site according to § 8 of the statutes governing the Nobel archives of the Royal Swedish Academy of Sciences”)	(Note: “Data of Allan Verne Cox (id 16556) are hidden at the Nomination Archive site according to § 8 of the statutes governing the Nobel archives of the Royal Swedish Academy of Sciences”) Jointly nominated only (Note: “Data of Brent Dalrymple (id 16557) are hidden at the Nomination Archive site according to § 8 of the statutes governing the Nobel archives of the Royal Swedish Academy of Sciences”)
	Gary Brent Dalrymple	May 9, 1937; Alhambra, California, United States	(aged 89)	1973	Jointly nominated only
	Pierre-Michel Duffieux	February 21, 1891; Saint-Macaire, France	June 3, 1976; Besançon, France	1973	Nominated jointly with P.Jacquinot the only time by Pierre Rouard (1908-1989) from Marseille
	Wojciech Sylwester Piotr Rubinowicz	February 22, 1889; Sadagóra, Bukovina, Austro-Hungarian Empire	October 13, 1974; Warsaw, Poland	1973	Nominated jointly with Ali Javan the only time
	Martin Moses Block	November 29, 1925; Newark, New Jersey, United States	July 22, 2016; Los Angeles, California, United States	1973	Nominated jointly with M.Ryle and Abd.Salam the only time
	Sven Gösta Nilsson	January 14, 1927; Kristianstad, Sweden	April 24, 1979; Lund, Sweden	1973	Nominated jointly with A.N.Bohr and B.R.Mottelson the only time by Willard Lindley Talbert, Jr. (1932-2023) from the Iowa State
	Herbert Friedman	June 21, 1916; Brooklyn, New York, United States	September 9, 2000; Arlington County, Virginia, United States	1973	Nominated jointly with S.Chandrasekhar and N.F.Ramsey Jr. the only time by G.H.Fr.O.J.Herzberg
	John Shipley Rowlinson	May 12, 1926; Handforth, Cheshire, England, UK	August 15, 2018; Palo Alto, California, United States	1973	Nominated jointly with R.Kubo and Il.R.Prigogine the only time by Friedrich Kohler (1924–2007) from the University of Vienna
	René Turlay	February 18, 1932; Bègles, France	November 29, 2002; Fontenay-lès-Briis, France	1973	Jointly nominated with J.H.Christenson only (Note: “Data of René Turlay (id 16608) are hidden at the Nomination Archive site according to § 8 of the statutes governing the Nobel archives of the Royal Swedish Academy of Sciences”)
	Phyllis St. Freier (née Cyr)	January 19 (or 21), 1921; Minneapolis, Minnesota, United States	December 18, 1992; St. Paul, Minnesota, United States	1973	Jointly nominated the only time by W.Fr.Libby
	Edward Purdy Ney	October 28, 1920; Minneapolis, Minnesota, United States	July 9, 1996; Minneapolis, Minnesota, United States	1973	Jointly nominated the only time by W.Fr.Libby
	Edward Joseph Lofgren	January 18, 1914; Chicago, Illinois, United States	September 6, 2016	1973	Jointly nominated the only time by W.Fr.Libby
	Frank Friedman Oppenheimer	August 14, 1912; New York City, United States	February 3, 1985; Sausalito, California, United States	1973	Jointly nominated the only time by W.Fr.Libby
	Harry Lehmann	March 21, 1924; Güstrow, Germany	November 22, 1998; Hamburg, Germany	1973	Jointly nominated with K.Symanzik only
	Wolfhart Zimmermann	February 17, 1928; Freiburg im Breisgau, Germany	September 18, 2016; Hamburg, Germany	1973	Jointly nominated with K.Symanzik only
	Kurt Symanzik	November 21, 1923; Lyck, East Prussia, Germany	October 25, 1983; Hamburg, Germany	1973, 1975	
	Ugo Fano	July 28, 1912; Turin, Italy	February 13, 2001; Chicago, Illinois, United States	1973, 1975	
	André Guinier	August 1, 1911; Nancy, France	July 3, 2000; Paris, France	1973, 1975	Nominated for the Nobel Prize in Chemistry too
	Peter Bernhard Hirsch	January 16, 1925; Berlin, Germany	September 12, 2025	1973, 1974, 1975	
1974
	Michael John Whelan	November 2, 1931	November 30, 2024	1974	Nominated jointly with P.B.Hirsch the only time by R.W.Cahn
	Leo James Rainwater	December 9, 1917; Council, Idaho, United States	May 31, 1986; New York City, United States	1974, 1975	Shared the 1975 Nobel Prize in Physics with A.N.Bohr and B.R.Mottelson
	Steven Weinberg	May 3, 1933; New York City, United States	July 23, 2021; Austin, Texas, United States	1974, 1975	Shared the 1979 Nobel Prize in Physics with M.Abd.Salam and Sh.L.Glashow
	Peter Dennis Mitchell	September 29, 1920; Mitcham, Surrey, England	April 10, 1992; Bodmin, Cornwall, England	1974	Won the 1978 Nobel Prize in Chemistry
	Walter Kohn	March 9, 1923; Vienna, Austria	April 19, 2016; Santa Barbara, California, United States	1974	Won the 1998 Nobel Prize in Chemistry
	Herbert Philip Broida	December 25, 1920; Aurora, Colorado, United States	April 9, 1978; Santa Barbara, California, United States	1974	Nominated the only time
	José Leite Lopes	October 28, 1918; Recife, Pernambuco, Brazil	June 12, 2006; Rio de Janeiro, Brazil	1974	Nominated the only time by O.B.Klein
	Heinz Maier-Leibnitz	March 28, 1911; Esslingen am Neckar, Germany	December 16, 2000; Allensbach, Germany	1974	Nominated the only time
	Саранцев, Владислав Павлович	September 23, 1930; Saratov, Russian Empire	January 31, 1995; Moscow, Russian Federation	1974	Nominated the only time by Ivan Štoll(1935–2017)
	Ralph Asher Alpher	February 3, 1921; Washington, D.C., United States	August 12, 2007; Austin, Texas, United States	1974	Jointly nominated the only time by R.Hofstadter
	Robert Herman	August 29, 1914; Bronx, New York City, United States	February 13, 1997; Austin, Texas, United States	1974	Jointly nominated the only time by R.Hofstadter
	David Robert Bates	November 18, 1916; Omagh, County Tyrone, Northern Ireland, UK	January 5, 1994; Belfast, Northern Ireland, UK	1974	Nominated jointly with H.St.W.Massey the only time by Jean-Claude Pebay-Peyroula (1930–2011) from the Joseph Fourier University, Grenoble
	Vernon Willard Hughes	May 28, 1921; Kankakee, Illinois, United States	March 25, 2003	1974	Nominated jointly with M.Deutsch the only time by A.Kastler
	John Adam Presper "Pres" Eckert Jr.	April 9, 1919; Philadelphia, Pennsylvania, United States	June 3, 1995; Bryn Mawr, Pennsylvania, United States	1974	Jointly nominated the only time by J.T.Wallmark
	John William Mauchly	August 30, 1907; Cincinnati, Ohio, United States	January 8, 1980; Ambler, Pennsylvania, United States	1974	Jointly nominated the only time by J.T.Wallmark
	Robert Gaston André Maréchal	December 10, 1916; La Garenne-Colombes, France	October 14, 2007; 17e arrondissement de Paris, France	1974	Nominated jointly with M.Françon the only time by Jean Barraud (1911-) from Université Paris 7
	Erwin Louis Hahn	June 9, 1921; Sharon, Pennsylvania, United States	September 20, 2016; Berkeley, California, United States	1974	Nominated jointly with J.H.Van Vleck the only time by Luigi Giulotto (1911-1986)
	Chia-Chiao Lin	July 7, 1916; Foochoo, China	January 13, 2013; Beijing, China	1974	Nominated jointly with J.H.Oort the only time by L.Biermann
	Manfred von Ardenne	January 20, 1907; Hamburg, Germany	May 26, 1997; Dresden, Saxony, Germany	1974	Nominated jointly with Erw.W.Müller and E.A.Fr.Ruska the only time by Frans Erik Wickman (1915–2003) from the Penn State
	Lincoln Wolfenstein	February 10, 1923; Cleveland, Ohio, United States	March 27, 2015; Oakland, California, United States	1974	Nominated jointly with J.W.Cronin and V.L.Fitch the only time by G.Marx
	Paul Glansdorff	October 17, 1904; Saint-Gilles, Belgium	June 23, 1999; Uccle, Belgium	1974, 1975	Nominated jointly with Il.R.Prigogine only
	Kjell Johnsen	June 11, 1921; Meland, Norway	July 18, 2007; La Rippe, Switzerland	1974, 1975	
	Leo Philip Kadanoff	January 14, 1937; New York City, United States	October 26, 2015; Chicago, Illinois, United States	1974, 1975	Nominated jointly with K.G."Ken" Wilson only
	Robert Eugene Marshak	October 11, 1916; Bronx, New York City, United States	December 23, 1992; Cancún, Mexico	1974, 1975	Nominated jointly with M.A.Salam by Jan S. Nilsson (1932-2010) only
	Ennackal Chandy George Sudarshan	September 16, 1931; Pallom, Travancore, British India	May 13, 2018; Austin, Texas, United States	1974, 1975	Nominated jointly with M.A.Salam by Jan S. Nilsson (1932-2010) only
1975
	Burton Richter	March 22, 1931; Brooklyn, New York, United States	July 18, 2018; Stanford, California, United States	1975 (Note: “Nominations 25412, 25374 and 25645 are hidden at the Nomination Archive site according to § 8 of the statutes governing the Nobel archives of the Royal Swedish Academy of Sciences”)	Shared the 1976 Nobel Prize in Physics (Note: "for their pioneering work in the discovery of a heavy elementary particle of a new kind")
	Samuel Chao Chung Ting	January 27, 1936; Ann Arbor, Michigan, United States	(aged 90)	1975	Shared the 1976 Nobel Prize in Physics
	Philip Warren Anderson	December 13, 1923; Indianapolis, Indiana, United States	March 29, 2020; Princeton, New Jersey, United States	1975	Shared the 1977 Nobel Prize in Physics (Note: "for their fundamental theoretical investigations of the electronic structure of magnetic and disordered systems") with N.Fr.Mott and J.H.Van Vleck
	Robert Coleman Richardson	June 26, 1937; Washington, D.C., United States	February 19, 2013; Ithaca, New York, United States	1975	Shared the 1996 Nobel Prize in Physics (Note: "for their discovery of superfluidity in helium-3") with D.M.Lee and D.D.Osheroff
	Gerardus "Gerard" 't Hooft	July 5, 1946; Den Helder, Netherlands	(aged 80)	1975 (Note: “Nomination 25437 is hidden at the Nomination Archive site according to § 8 of the statutes governing the Nobel archives of the Royal Swedish Academy of Sciences”)	Shared the 1999 Nobel Prize in Physics (Note: "for elucidating the quantum structure of electroweak interactions in physics") with M.J.G. "Tini" Veltman
	Alferov, Zhores Ivanovich	March 15, 1930; Vitebsk, Belarus then in USSR	March 1, 2019; Saint Petersburg, Russia	1975	Shared the 2000 Nobel Prize in Physics (Note: "for basic work on information and communication technology") with H.Kroemer (Note: "for developing semiconductor heterostructures used in high-speed- and opto-electronics") and J. St.Cl. Kilby
	David Allan Bromley	May 4, 1926; Westmeath, Canada	February 10, 2005; New Haven, Connecticut, United States	1975	
	Bernard Louis Roger Cagnac	February 6, 1931; Paris, France	July 3, 2019; Olivet, Loiret, France	1975	
	Samuel Cornette Collins	September 28, 1898; Democrat, Kentucky, United States	June 19, 1984; Washington, D.C., United States	1975	
	Pierre Douzou	August 25, 1926; Millau, Aveyron, France	June 9, 2000; Saclay, France	1975	
	Siegfried Flügge	March 16, 1912; Dresden, Germany	December 15, 1997; Hinterzarten, Germany	1975	
	Goldanski, Witali Iossifowitsch	June 18, 1923; Vitebsk then in USSR	January 14, 2001; Moscow, Russia	1975	Nominated for the Nobel Prize in Chemistry too
	Keldysh, Leonid Veniaminovich	April 7, 1931; Moscow, Russia	November 11, 2016; Moscow, Russia	1975	
	Lobashev, Vladimir Mikhailovich	July 29, 1934; Leningrad Russia, then in USSR	August 3, 2011; Troitsk, Russia	1975	
	Olli Viktor Lounasmaa	August 20, 1930; Turku, Finland	December 27, 2002; Goa, India	1975	
	Herbert Mayer	January 13, 1900; Chernivtsi, Bukovina	February 16, 1992	1975	
	Davydov, Alexander Sergeevich	December 26, 1912; Yevpatoria, Crimea, Russian Empire	February 19, 1993; Kiev, Ukraine	1975	Nominated jointly with Serge Nikitine (1904-1986) only
	Serge Nikitine	August 20, 1904; Odesa, Kherson Governorate, Russian Empire	June 30, 1986; Strasbourg, France	1975	
	Allan Rex Sandage	June 18, 1926; Iowa City, Iowa, United States	November 13, 2010; San Gabriel, California, United States	1975	
	Bruno Touschek	February 3, 1921; Vienna, Austria	May 25, 1978; Innsbruck, Austria	1975	
	Thorsten Åberg	July 14, 1904; Motala, Sweden	October 11, 1989; Hallsberg, Sweden	1975	
	Brookhaven National Laboratory	1947; Upton, Suffolk County, New York, United States		1975	
	SLAC National Accelerator Laboratory	1962; Menlo Park, California, United States		1975	Nominated jointly with Brookhaven National Laboratory only
	Stephen William Hawking	January 8, 1942; Oxford, England	March 14, 2018; Cambridge, England	1975	Nominated jointly with M.Schwarzschild only
	Gerard Kitchen O'Neill	February 6, 1927; Brooklyn, New York, United States	April 27, 1992; Redwood City, California, United States	1975	Nominated jointly with H.Kallmann only
	Lawrence W. Kessler	September 26, 1942; Chicago, United States	(aged 84)	1975 (Note: “Nomination 25408 is hidden at the Nomination Archive site according to § 8 of the statutes governing the Nobel archives of the Royal Swedish Academy of Sciences”)	Nominated jointly once by Eberhard Häusler from Saarbrücken
	Adrianus Korpel	February 18, 1932; Rotterdam, Netherlands	October 1, 2023; Oro Valley, Arizona, US	1975	Nominated jointly once by Eberhard Häusler from Saarbrücken
	John Frank Allen	May 5, 1908; Winnipeg, Manitoba, Canada	April 22, 2001; Elie and Earlsferry, Fife, Scotland	1975	
	Faddeev, Ludvig Dmitrievich	March 23, 1934; Leningrad Russia, then in USSR	February 26, 2017; Saint Petersburg, Russia	1975	Nominated jointly with N.N.Bogolyubov and E.C.G.Stueckelberg only
	Philip George Burke	October 18, 1932; London, England	June 4, 2019	1975	Nominated jointly with Ugo Fano and G.J.Schulz only
	Hendrik Brugt Gerhard Casimir	July 15, 1909; The Hague, Netherlands	May 4, 2000; Heeze, Netherlands	1975	
	Robert Louis Fleischer	July 8, 1930; Columbus, Ohio, United States	March 3, 2011	1975	Nominated jointly with P.B.Price and R.M.Walker only
	Cyril Hilsum	May 17, 1925	September 23, 2026	1975 (Note: “Nomination 25429 is hidden at the Nomination Archive site according to § 8 of the statutes governing the Nobel archives of the Royal Swedish Academy of Sciences”)	Nominated jointly with J. B. Gunn only
	William Thornton Read, Jr.	January 23, 1921; New Haven, Connecticut, United States	January 31, 1998	1975	Nominated jointly with J. B. Gunn only
	Brian Kidd Ridley	March 2, 1931; Newcastle Upon Tyne, England	May 22, 2024	1975	Nominated jointly with J. B. Gunn only
	Xavier Le Pichon	18 June 1937; Qui Nhơn, Annam, French Indochina	22 March 2025; Sisteron, France	1975 (Note: “Nomination 25432 is hidden at the Nomination Archive site according to § 8 of the statutes governing the Nobel archives of the Royal Swedish Academy of Sciences”)	Nominated jointly once by T.Utsu
	Dan Peter McKenzie	February 21, 1942; Cheltenham, England	(aged 84)	1975	Nominated jointly once by T.Utsu
	William Jason Morgan	October 10, 1935; Savannah, Georgia, United States	July 31, 2023; Natick, Massachusetts, United States	1975	Nominated jointly once by T.Utsu
	Joel Louis Lebowitz	May 10, 1930; Tiachiv, Transcarpathia	(aged 96)	1975 (Note: “Nomination 25439 is hidden at the Nomination Archive site according to § 8 of the statutes governing the Nobel archives of the Royal Swedish Academy of Sciences”)	Nominated jointly with Fr.J.Dyson once by W.Ed.Thirring
	Andrew Lenard	July 18, 1927; Balmazújváros, Hungary	March 17, 2020; Bloomington, Indiana, United States	1975	Nominated jointly with Fr.J.Dyson once by W.Ed.Thirring
	Elliott Hershel Lieb	July 31, 1932; Boston, Massachusetts, United States	(aged 94)	1975	Nominated jointly with Fr.J.Dyson once by W.Ed.Thirring
1976
Nominees are usually published 50 years later (2026), so 1976 nominees should be published at 2027.
				1976	

== See also ==
- List of Nobel laureates in Physics
- List of nominees for the Nobel Prize in Chemistry
- List of nominees for the Nobel Prize in Physiology or Medicine
- List of nominees for the Nobel Prize in Literature
- List of individuals nominated for the Nobel Peace Prize
- List of organizations nominated for the Nobel Peace Prize
