= Tilman Esslinger =

German physicist

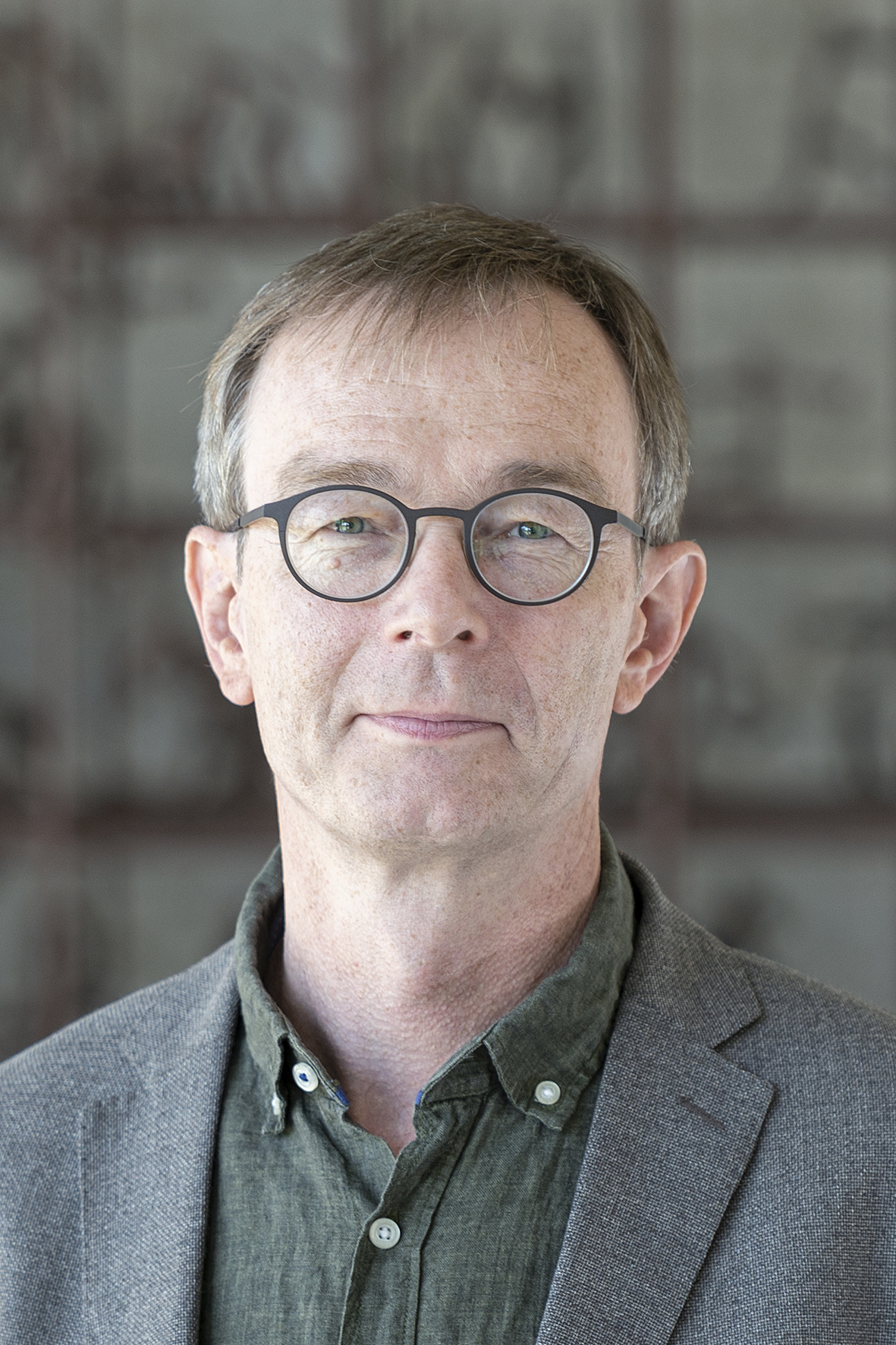
- Tilman Esslinger (2019)
- Born: 25 July 1965 (age 61)
- Education: LMU Munich
- Known for: Ultracold quantum gases, optical lattices, Mott insulators, experimental realization of the topological Haldane model
- Awards: Philip Morris Research Prize (2000); Fellow of the American Physical Society (2014); Senior BEC Award (2021); Honorary doctorate, Heriot-Watt University (2022); Micius Quantum Prize (2025)
- Scientific career
- Fields: Physicist
- Workplaces: ETH Zurich
- Doctoral advisor: Theodor Hänsch
- Website: www.quantumoptics.ethz.ch

Tilman Esslinger is a German experimental physicist. He is a Professor at ETH Zurich, Switzerland, and works in the field of ultracold quantum gases and optical lattices.

== Biography ==
Tilman Esslinger received his PhD in physics from LMU Munich and the Max Planck Institute of Quantum Optics, Germany, in 1995. In his doctoral research, he worked under the supervision of Theodor Hänsch on subrecoil laser cooling and optical lattices. He then built up his own group in Hänsch's lab and conducted pioneering work on atom lasers, observed long-range phase coherence in a Bose–Einstein condensate, and realized the superfluid to Mott-insulator transition with a Bose gas in an optical lattice.

Following his habilitation, Esslinger was appointed full professor at ETH Zurich, Switzerland, in October 2001, where he pioneered one-dimensional atomic quantum gases, Fermi–Hubbard models with atoms, a quantum-gas analogue of the topological Haldane model, mesoscopic transport with neutral atoms, and the merger of quantum-gas experiments with cavity quantum electrodynamics.

== Research ==
The work of Esslinger and his group has stimulated an interdisciplinary exchange between the condensed-matter and quantum-gas communities. Notable results include the development of a quantum simulator for graphene, the setting up of a cavity-optomechanical system in which the Dicke quantum phase transition to a superradiant state has been observed for the first time, as well as the creation of a cold-atom analogue of mesoscopic conductors and the observation of the onset of superfluidity in that system.

A central focus of Esslinger's research has been the Fermi–Hubbard model, a foundational framework in condensed-matter physics for the electronic and magnetic properties of solids. His group was the first to realize the model using ultracold atoms in an optical lattice, subsequently observing a fermionic Mott insulator and short-range quantum magnetism. By periodically driving the lattice using Floquet engineering, the group achieved an enhancement and sign reversal of magnetic correlations, and used the same approach to engineer density-dependent Peierls phases, a mechanism relevant to the quantum simulation of lattice gauge theories.

Combining cavity-mediated long-range interactions with short-range interactions in an optical lattice, the group observed a first-order phase transition arising from the competition between the two, and a supersolid phase breaking a continuous translational symmetry, together with its characteristic Higgs and Goldstone modes.

Extending their work on mesoscopic transport with neutral atoms, Esslinger and collaborators demonstrated an atomic analogue of the thermoelectric effect and observed quantized conductance in neutral matter for the first time.

Building on the group's realization of the topological Haldane model, dynamical optical lattices were used to implement topological pumps, allowing the interplay between strong interactions and topology to be explored. This approach was subsequently adapted to implement geometric two-qubit gates, realizing 17,000 SWAP gates operating in parallel with an average fidelity of 99.91%.

He is an author of more than 140 peer-reviewed journal articles, which have been cited more than 45,000 times (as of July 2026).

== Awards and honours ==
Esslinger was awarded the Philip Morris Research Prize in 2000, jointly with Theodor Hänsch and Immanuel Bloch. He received ERC Advanced Grants in 2010 and 2017, and was elected a Fellow of the American Physical Society in 2014. In 2021 he shared the Senior BEC Award with Rudolf Grimm. In 2022, Heriot-Watt University awarded him an honorary doctorate, and he received an Advanced Grant from the Swiss National Science Foundation. In 2025, Esslinger received the Micius Quantum Prize, jointly with Immanuel Bloch and Markus Greiner, "for the pioneering experimental realization of bosonic and fermionic Hubbard models in optical lattices as analog quantum simulators of strongly interacting many-body systems for comprehensive investigations of quantum phases, transport, and topological phenomena."
