= Optical clock =

Type of atomic clock

Optical clocks are a subset of atomic clocks and are based on transitions that emit electromagnetic radiation in the range of 200 nm to 1000 nm. Like other atomic clocks, they are based on the measurement of the resonant frequency of atoms. However, the first atomic clocks mostly operated at microwave frequencies, and therefore were much slower and thus less precise than optical-frequency clocks could be.

Optical light oscillates at frequencies near 500 THz, more than 50,000 times faster than the cesium microwave atomic clock. Because of their speed, optical clocks have been demonstrated to keep time with less error than microwave caesium clocks for the definition of the second. John L. Hall and Theodor W. Hansch shared the 2005 Nobel Prize in Physics for their contributions to optical clock development. Optical clocks have been based on a number of atoms, including magnesium, aluminum, potassium, calcium, rubidium, strontium, indium, ytterbium, mercury, and radium. These atoms emit electromagnetic radiation when stimulated by coherent, intense light, for example the 728 nm transition in singly-ionized calcium or the 467 nm and 436 nm transitions in singly-ionized ytterbium.

The major obstacle in operating an optical clock was the difficulty of directly measuring optical frequencies. Before the demonstration of the frequency comb in 2000, terahertz techniques were needed to bridge the gap between radio and optical frequencies, and the systems for doing so were cumbersome and complicated. This problem has been solved with the development of self-referenced mode-locked lasers, commonly referred to as femtosecond frequency combs.

The precision of a clock is the smallest unit of time it can measure, and comes from counting oscillations of visible light, which oscillates at approximately 700 quadrillion times a second. These oscillations divide a second into 700 quadrillion intervals, with each of those intervals being roughly 10^{−18} seconds. By counting oscillations of laser light, one can measure time to within one such interval. The laser light is stabilized by the atomic transition; the trapped atom or atoms are excited when the laser light is resonant with the transition frequency. State-of-the-art optical clocks, which can measure atomic clock transition frequencies to better than one part in 10^{19}, represent the most precise measurements in the world.

== Overview ==
=== Operation ===
The local oscillator is referenced to the clock transition. In optical clocks, the oscillator is laser light stabilized to the atomic clock transition.

=== Types of Optical Clock ===
Optical clocks fall into two main types: neutral atom or ion-based clocks. For example, a clock using neutral atoms might have millions of neutral strontium atoms trapped in an optical lattice. The first optical lattice clock was completed by Hidetoshi Katori at the University of Tokyo in 2003, who had proposed the concept two years earlier. Ion clocks such as the co-trapped aluminum and mercury ion clock confine single or a few ionized atoms within a deep, well-isolated ion trap. One of 2012's Physics Nobelists, David J. Wineland, is a pioneer in exploiting the properties of a single ion held in a trap to develop clocks of the highest stability. Ion clocks such as the co-trapped aluminum and mercury ion clock confine single or a few ionized atoms within a deep, well-isolated ion trap. In atomic species with atomic transitions that cannot be read out with conventional lasers, a second atom with an accessible transition is co-trapped and coupled to the internal state of the clock ion, and the clock state is transferred to this co-trapped atom. This technique is known as quantum logic spectroscopy. Clocks using neutral and ionized atoms form the bases for state-of-the-art optical clocks. These systems are carefully characterized to account for shifts in the resonant frequency of the atomic transition due to external electromagnetic perturbations. Lasers and magneto-optical traps are used to cool the atoms for improved precision.

=== Optical Clock Transitions ===
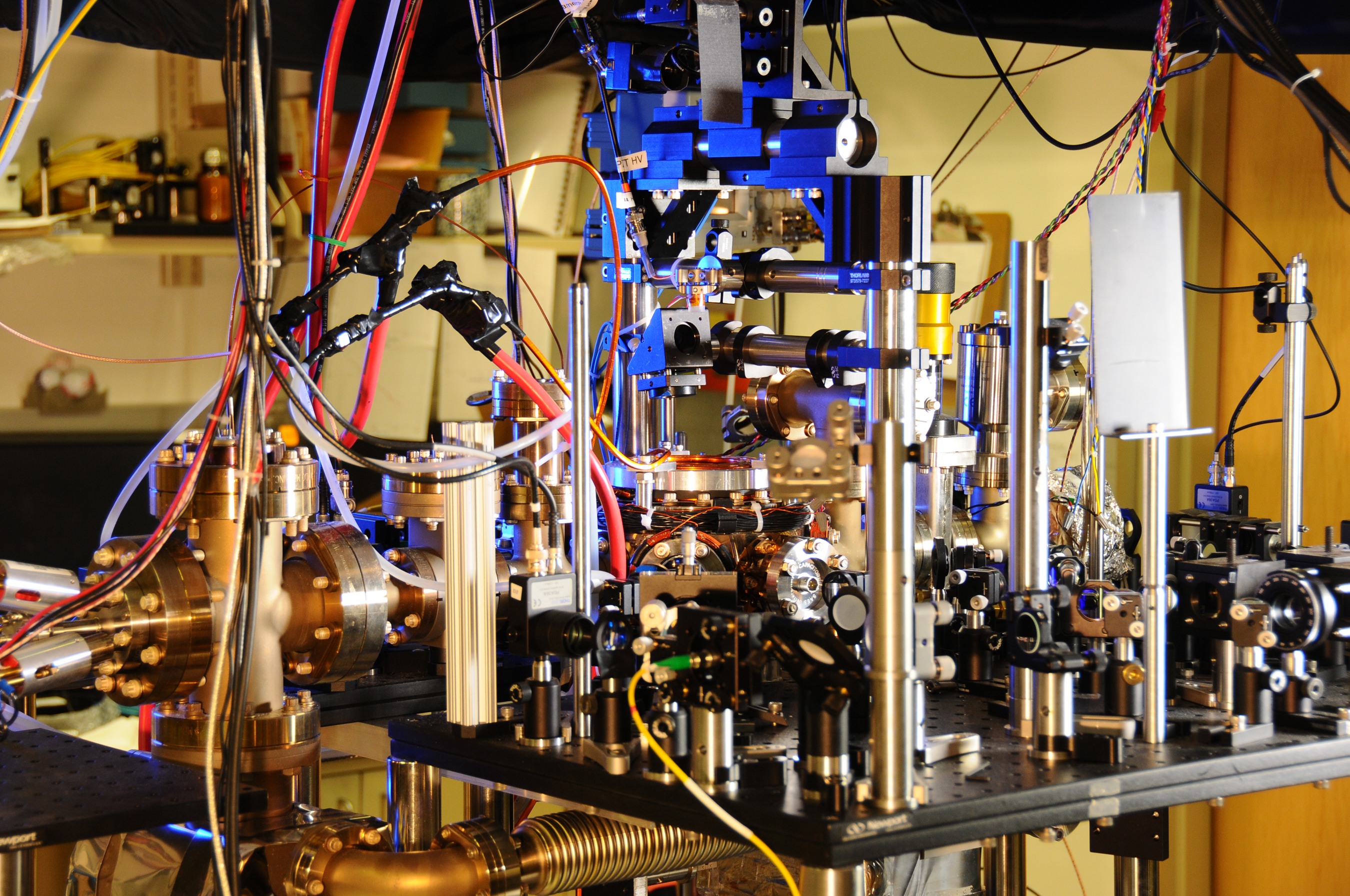
One of two ytterbium optical clocks at NIST (2013).

Optical clocks are based on narrow electronic transitions in the optical domain. These transitions include electric quadrupole, electric octupole, and spin-flipping transitions. The transition is used as a frequency reference for the clock laser. The wavelength required for the clock laser to reach this transition must be carefully considered when designing an optical clock. Otherwise very promising atomic species are not widely pursued because of inaccessible clock transitions, such as Th-229 and highly charged ions. In both of these cases, the clock transition is far into the ultraviolet. Laser technology at these wavelengths is not robust, and they must be operated in vacuum because air otherwise strongly absorbs light in this frequency range. Another desirable characteristic is an electronic structure amenable to laser cooling. If the atom or ion cannot be reliably laser cooled, it must be co-trapped with another, easily coolable, atomic species that can provide sympathetic cooling. Other desired features include properties that reduce the effect of perturbations from external electric and magnetic fields, such as a large mass, and a reliable, long-term term source that can be sealed in vacuum for years.

The rare-earth element ytterbium (Yb) is valued not so much for its mechanical properties but for its complement of internal energy levels. "A particular transition in Yb atoms, at a wavelength of 578 nm, currently provides one of the world's most accurate optical atomic frequency standards," said Marianna Safronova. The estimated uncertainty achieved corresponds to about one second over the lifetime of the universe so far, 15 billion years, according to scientists at the Joint Quantum Institute (JQI) and the University of Delaware in December 2012.

== History ==
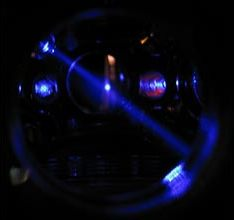
May 2009– JILA's strontium optical atomic clock is based on neutral atoms. Shining a blue laser onto ultracold strontium atoms in an optical trap tests how efficiently a previous burst of light from a red laser has boosted the atoms to an excited state. Only those atoms that remain in the lower energy state respond to the blue laser, causing the fluorescence seen here.

=== Pre-2010 ===
Optical transitions in alkaline earth atoms like calcium and strontium were identified as possible clock transition candidates in the 1980s and 1990s. However, dividing optical frequencies, hundreds of THz, down to radio frequencies that can be used for timekeeping, was a technical challenge. In parallel, laser technology and the technique of generating pulses of light, equally frequency-spaced comb "teeth" progressed. A key development was the determination of the frequency offset in the comb envelope which determines the absolute frequency of the comb teeth. Work related to the development of this technology led to the awarding of the Nobel Prize in Physics to John L. Hall and Theodor W. Hänsch in 2005.

With the maturation of frequency combs, optical clock transitions could be compared to microwave standards locked to the same comb. These include the 267 nm transition in ^{27}Al^{+} and the 282 nm transition in ^{199}Hg^{+} at NIST.

=== 2010s ===
In 2013 optical lattice clocks (OLCs) were shown to be as good as or better than caesium fountain clocks. Two optical lattice clocks containing about 10000 atoms of strontium-87 were able to stay in synchrony with each other at a precision of at least 1.5×10^{−16}, which is as accurate as the experiment could measure. These clocks have been shown to keep pace with all three of the caesium fountain clocks at the Paris Observatory. There are two reasons for the possibly better precision. Firstly, the frequency is measured using light, which has a much higher frequency than microwaves, and secondly, by using many atoms, any errors are averaged.

Using ytterbium-171 atoms, a new record for stability with a precision of 1.6×10^{−18} over a 7-hour period was published on 22 August 2013. At this stability, the two optical lattice clocks working independently from each other used by the NIST research team would differ less than a second over the age of the universe (13.8×10^{9} years); this was 10 times better than previous experiments. The clocks rely on 10 000 ytterbium atoms cooled to 10 microkelvin and trapped in an optical lattice. A laser at 578 nm excites the atoms between two of their energy levels. Having established the stability of the clocks, the researchers are studying external influences and evaluating the remaining systematic uncertainties, in the hope that they can bring the clock's accuracy down to the level of its stability. An improved optical lattice clock was described in a 2014 Nature paper.

In 2015, JILA evaluated the absolute frequency uncertainty of a strontium-87 optical lattice clock at 2.1×10^{−18}, which corresponds to a measurable gravitational time dilation for an elevation change of 2 cm (0.79 in) on planet Earth that according to JILA/NIST Fellow Jun Ye is "getting really close to being useful for relativistic geodesy". At this frequency uncertainty, this JILA optical lattice clock is expected to neither gain nor lose a second in more than 15 billion years.

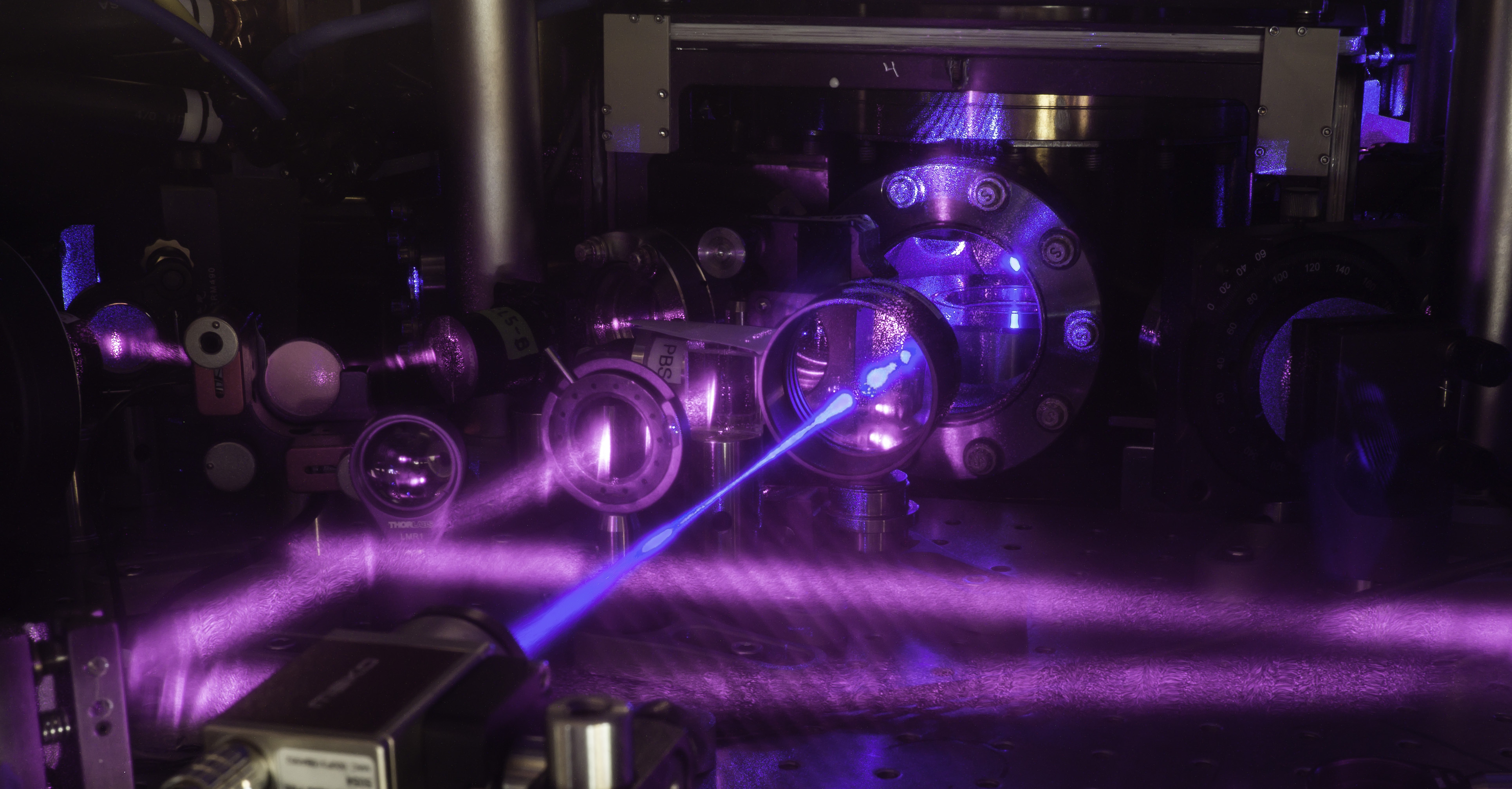
JILA's 2017 three-dimensional (3-D) quantum gas atomic clock consists of a grid of light formed by three pairs of laser beams. A stack of two tables is used to configure optical components around a vacuum chamber. Shown here is the upper table, where lenses and other optics are mounted. A blue laser beam excites a cube-shaped cloud of strontium atoms located behind the round window in the middle of the table. Strontium atoms fluoresce strongly when excited with blue light.

In 2017 JILA reported an experimental 3D quantum gas strontium optical lattice clock in which strontium-87 atoms are packed into a tiny three-dimensional (3-D) cube at 1,000 times the density of previous one-dimensional (1-D) clocks, such as the 2015 JILA clock. A comparison between two regions of the same 3D lattice yielded a residual precision of 5×10^{−19} in 1 hour of averaging time. This precision value does not represent the absolute accuracy or precision of the clock, which remain above 1×10^{−18} and 1×10^{−17} respectively. The 3D quantum gas strontium optical lattice clock's centerpiece is an unusual state of matter called a degenerate Fermi gas (a quantum gas for Fermi particles). The experimental data shows the 3D quantum gas clock achieved a residual precision of 3.5×10^{−19} in about two hours. According to Jun Ye, "this represents a significant improvement over any previous demonstrations". Ye further commented "the most important potential of the 3D quantum gas clock is the ability to scale up the atom numbers, which will lead to a huge gain in stability" and "the ability to scale up both the atom number and coherence time will make this new-generation clock qualitatively different from the previous generation".

In 2018, JILA reported the 3D quantum gas clock reached a residual frequency precision of 2.5×10^{−19} over 6 hours. Recently it has been proved that the quantum entanglement can help to further enhance the clock stability.

=== 2020s ===
Recent progress on optical clocks in the 2020s have enabled them to be well-positioned to be the new standard for timekeeping in the next few years. Currently, rubidium and caesium microwave standards regularly deliver time to the International Bureau of Weights and Measures (BIPM) for establishing International Atomic Time (TAI). As the optical experimental clocks move beyond their microwave counterparts in terms of accuracy and stability performance, they could replace the caesium fountain clock as the new standard for time. The BIPM reported in December 2021 that based on the progress of optical standards contributing to TAI, the Consultative Committee for Time and Frequency (CCTF) initiated work towards a redefinition of the second expected during the 2030s. Some optical clocks are already being used as secondary frequency references for TAI. In June 2022, National Institute of Information and Communications Technology (NICT) of Japan began using a strontium optical lattice clock to keep Japan Standard Time (JST) by incorporating it into the existing cesium atom clock system and using it to adjust the time signal.

In February 2022, scientists at the University of Wisconsin-Madison reported a "multiplexed" optical atomic clock, where individual clocks deviated from each other with an accuracy equivalent to losing a second in 300 billion years. The reported minor deviation is explainable as the concerned clock oscillators are in slightly different environments. These are causing differing reactions to gravity, magnetic fields, or other conditions. This miniaturized clock network approach is novel in that it uses an optical lattice of strontium atoms and a configuration of six clocks that can be used to demonstrate relative stability, fractional uncertainty between clocks and methods for ultra-high-precision comparisons between optical atomic clock ensembles that are located close together in a metrology facility.

In July 2022, atomic optical clocks based on iodine molecules were demonstrated at-sea on a naval vessel and operated continuously in the Pacific Ocean for 20 days in the Exercise RIMPAC 2022. These technologies originally funded by the U.S. Department of Defense have led to the world's first commercial rackmount optical clock in November 2023.

== Applications ==
=== Tests of fundamental physics ===
Owing to their unprecedented accuracy, optical clocks provide a new avenue for testing fundamental laws of physics, such as general relativity, Lorentz symmetry and time variation of fundamental constants. For example, an experiment at the Tokyo Skytree compared two strontium optical lattice clocks to test general relativity by measuring the gravitational redshift with an uncertainty of 10^{-5}. A comparison of two different clock transitions in a single trapped ytterbium ion constrained the time variation of the proton-to-electron mass ratio to 10^{-16} yr^{-1} and the time variation of the fine structure constant to 10^{-17} yr^{-1}.

=== Navigation and gravitational sensing ===
The sensitivity of optical clocks to gravitational potential make them promising probes of gravity. In 2022, researchers were able to resolve the gravitational redshift on a sub-millimeter scale using an ultracold strontium clock. In 2020, optical clocks were researched for space applications like future generations of global navigation satellite systems (GNSSs) as replacements for microwave based clocks.

== See also ==
- Laser cooling
- Atomic clocks
- Time and frequency metrology
