= Monika Aidelsburger =

German quantum physicist

- Born: 1987 (age 38–39); Aichach, Bavaria, Germany
- Education: LMU Munich
- Scientific career
- Workplaces: Collège de France; LMU Munich
- Thesis: Artificial gauge fields with ultracold atoms in optical lattice (2015)
- Doctoral advisor: Immanuel Bloch

Monika Aidelsburger (born 1987) is a German quantum physicist, Professor and Group Leader at LMU Munich. Her research considers quantum simulation and ultra cold atomic gases trapped in optical lattices. In 2021, she was awarded both the Alfried-Krupp-Förderpreis and Klung Wilhelmy Science Award.

== Early life and education ==
Born in Aichach, Aidelsburger was a doctoral student at LMU Munich, where she worked under the supervision of Immanuel Bloch. Her work considered ultra cold atoms in optical lattices.

She was a postdoctoral researcher at the Collège de France, where she worked alongside Jean Dalibard on uniform Bose gas. Her doctorate was later published by Springer Nature as part of their Outstanding PhD thesis series.

== Research and career ==
In 2017 Aidelsburger joined the faculty at LMU Munich, where she was promoted to Professor in 2019. She holds a joint position at the Max Planck Institute of Quantum Optics. Here she successfully applied for a European Research Council Starting Grant on synthetic quantum matter.

Her research considers lattice gauge theories and how they couple to fermionic matter. She performs quantum simulations of many-body physics. These simulations can achieve with a high degree of control and can achieve complex physical behaviour, including many-body localization and Hilbert space fragmentation. They can be engineered to investigate out-of-equilibrium phases and topological lattice models, including the Haldane model and Hofstadter's butterfly. Her experiments typically contain a laser cooling stage, where atoms are cooled to very low temperatures (generating either Bose–Einstein condensates or degenerate Fermi gases), which she traps into optical potentials that are generated by interfering laser beams.

The Swiss National Science Foundation nominated Aidelsburger to AcademiaNet in 2021. That year, she was awarded both the Alfried-Krupp-Förderpreis, named after Alfried Krupp von Bohlen und Halbach, and Klung Wilhelmy Science Award in 2021.

== Awards and recognitions ==
- 2016 Marie Curie Fellowship
- 2019 Prinzessin Therese von Bayern Award
- 2021 Alfried-Krupp-Förderpreis
- 2021 Klung Wilhelmy Science Award

== Selected publications ==
- Monika Aidelsburger; M Atala; M Lohse; Julio T. Barreiro; B Paredes; I Bloch (28 October 2013). "Realization of the Hofstadter Hamiltonian with ultracold atoms in optical lattices". Physical Review Letters. 111 (18) 185301. arXiv:1308.0321. Bibcode:2013PhRvL.111r5301A. doi:10.1103/PHYSREVLETT.111.185301. ISSN 0031-9007. PMID 24237530.
- M. Aidelsburger; M. Lohse; C. Schweizer; et al. (22 December 2014). "Measuring the Chern number of Hofstadter bands with ultracold bosonic atoms". Nature Physics. 11 (2): 162–166. arXiv:1407.4205. Bibcode:2015NatPh..11..162A. doi:10.1038/NPHYS3171. ISSN 1745-2473.
- Monika Aidelsburger; Atala M; Sylvain Nascimbène; Trotzky S; Chen YA; Bloch I (12 December 2011). "Experimental realization of strong effective magnetic fields in an optical lattice". Physical Review Letters. 107 (25) 255301. arXiv:1110.5314. doi:10.1103/PHYSREVLETT.107.255301. ISSN 0031-9007. PMID 22243087.
