= Micius Quantum Prize =

- Awarded for: promoting the quantum information science and technology research
- Location: Shanghai
- Country: China
- Hosted by: Micius quantum foundation, Chinese Academy of Sciences
- Reward: 1,000,000 ¥ (150,000$)
- First award: 2018
- Website: miciusprize.org

The Micius Quantum Prize (Chinese: 墨子量子奖) is awarded every year since 2018 "for promoting the quantum information science and technology research". The recipients are awarded one million Chinese yuan (about 150,000 US dollars) and a gold medal. The prize is awarded by the Micius quantum foundation, which was established thanks to donations (with a sum of 100 million Chinese yuan) from private entrepreneurs. Chair of the selection committee is Chunli Bai, the president of the Chinese Academy of Sciences.

The prize is named after Mozi, an ancient Chinese philosopher (~400 B.C) who founded the school of Mohism during the Hundred Schools of Thought period.

== Laureates ==
Year	Image	Laureate^{[A]}	Country^{[B]}	Rationale^{[C]}	Category	Ref
2018		David Deutsch	United Kingdom; Israel	"For his seminal conceptual contributions on quantum Turing machine and Quantum algorithm"	Theory	
2018		Peter Shor	United States	"For his groundbreaking theoretical work on factoring algorithm and quantum error correction"	Theory	
2018		Peter Zoller	Austria	"For their outstanding theoretical contributions that enabled the scalable implementations of quantum information processing such as quantum computation with trapped ions, quantum simulation with ultracold atoms, and quantum repeaters"	Theory	
2018		Ignacio Cirac	Spain	"For their outstanding theoretical contributions that enabled the scalable implementations of quantum information processing such as quantum computation with trapped ions, quantum simulation with ultracold atoms, and quantum repeaters"	Theory	
2018		Rainer Blatt	Germany; Austria	"For his pioneering experimental work on the realizations of quantum logic gates, multiparticle entanglement, quantum simulation, and quantum computing algorithms using trapped ions"	Experimental	
2018		David Wineland	United States	"For his groundbreaking experiments that opened the way to quantum computing and quantum metrology with trapped ions"	Experimental	
2019		Stephen Wiesner	Israel; United States	"For his original conceptual idea on conjugate coding that inspired the discovery of practical quantum cryptography"	Theory	
2019		Charles H. Bennett	United States	"For their inventions of quantum key distribution, quantum teleportation, and entanglement purification"	Theory	
2019		Gilles Brassard	Canada	"For their inventions of quantum key distribution, quantum teleportation, and entanglement purification"	Theory	
2019		Artur Ekert	Poland; United Kingdom	"For his inventions of entanglement-based quantum key distribution, entanglement swapping, and entanglement purification"	Theory	
2019		Pan Jianwei	China	"For their groundbreaking experiments in multi-photon interferometry and free-space quantum transmission that enabled practically secure and large-scale quantum communications"	Experimental	
2019		Anton Zeilinger	Austria	"For their groundbreaking experiments in multi-photon interferometry and free-space quantum transmission that enabled practically secure and large-scale quantum communications"	Experimental	
2020		Carlton M. Caves	United States	"For his foundational work on quantum metrology and quantum information theory, especially for elucidating the fundamental noise in interferometers and its suppression with the use of squeezed states."	Theory	
2020		Hidetoshi Katori	Japan	"For their groundbreaking achievements in precision quantum measurements, in particular for the development of extremely stable and accurate optical atomic clocks."	Experimental	
2020		Jun Ye	United States	"For their groundbreaking achievements in precision quantum measurements, in particular for the development of extremely stable and accurate optical atomic clocks."	Experimental	
2021		John Clarke	United States	"For their leading roles in pioneering superconducting quantum circuits and qubits."	Experimental	
2021		Michel H. Devoret	France; United States	"For their leading roles in pioneering superconducting quantum circuits and qubits."	Experimental	
2021		Yasunobu Nakamura	Japan	"For their leading roles in pioneering superconducting quantum circuits and qubits."	Experimental	
2022		Not awarded				
2023		Nicolas Gisin	Switzerland	"For their important contributions in early quantum key distribution experiments using optical fibers."	Experimental	
2023		John Rarity	United Kingdom	"For their important contributions in early quantum key distribution experiments using optical fibers."	Experimental	
2024		Not awarded				
2025		Immanuel Bloch	Germany	"For the pioneering experimental realization of bosonic and fermionic Hubbard models in optical lattices as analog quantum simulators of strongly interacting many-body systems for comprehensive investigations of quantum phases, transport, and topological phenomena."	Experimental	
2025		Tilman Esslinger	Germany	"For the pioneering experimental realization of bosonic and fermionic Hubbard models in optical lattices as analog quantum simulators of strongly interacting many-body systems for comprehensive investigations of quantum phases, transport, and topological phenomena."	Experimental	
2025		Markus Greiner	Germany	"For the pioneering experimental realization of bosonic and fermionic Hubbard models in optical lattices as analog quantum simulators of strongly interacting many-body systems for comprehensive investigations of quantum phases, transport, and topological phenomena."	Experimental	
