= Klung Wilhelmy Science Award =

German physics and chemistry award

The Klung Wilhelmy Science Award is an annual German award in the field of science, alternating annually between the categories of chemistry and physics. It is bestowed upon outstanding younger German scientists under the age of 40.

== Previous award names ==
- 1973 to 2001 – Otto-Klung Award
- 2001 to 2007 – Otto-Klung-Weberbank Award
- 2007 to 2013 – Klung-Wilhelmy-Weberbank Award

== Selection process ==
The prizewinners are selected by permanent committees at the Institutes of Chemistry and Biochemistry and the Department of Physics at the Free University of Berlin, with additional input from professors at other universities. Proposals and nominations by nationally and internationally renowned scientists are also taken into consideration. Self-nominations will not be accepted.

The final decision on the selection recommendations is made by the following foundations: the Otto Klung Foundation at the Free University of Berlin and the Dr. Wilhelmy Foundation. The stated aim of these foundations is to strengthen the promotion of outstanding scientific achievements and to reward internationally accredited innovative approaches. Five of the previously chosen prizewinners later received the Nobel Prize.

The prize was first awarded in 1973 by the Otto Klung Foundation. Since 2007, the prize has become one of the highest privately funded scientific endowments in Germany. The annual award ceremony, which has been held in November, is open to the public.

== Recipients ==
Chemistry	Physics
2024 : Max Martin Hansmann, honored for pioneering the development of novel organic compound classes and their innovative use as atom-transfer reagents and organic redox systems.	2023: Hannes Bernien, honored for ground-breaking contributions to the development of quantum simulation and computing platforms with Rydberg atoms and spins in diamond.
2022 : Viktoria Däschlein-Gessner, honored for her pioneering research in the field of synthetic and mechanistic inorganic chemistry as well as catalysis.	2021 : Monika Aidelsburger, honored for her experimental realization of synthetic gauge fields in optical lattices and their application to quantum simulators of topological phases of matter.
2020 : Franziska Schoenebeck, honored for her pioneering research in the fields of organic synthesis, catalysis, and computer-aided elucidation of reaction mechanisms.	2019 : Titus Neupert, honored for his contributions to the theoretical prediction of novel "topological" phases of matter, in particular fractional Chern insulators and higher-order topological insulators.
2018 : Philipp Kukura, honored for his pioneering work in the development and application of imaging methods for the visualization and characterization of single biomolecules.	2017 : Claus Ropers, honored for his pioneering achievements in the area of ultrafast electron microscopy and nonlinear light–matter interaction in nanostructures
2016 : Stephan A. Sieber, honored for his research on the synthesis of natural product inspired compounds for the fight against pathogenic bacteria and fundamental studies on bacterial virulence.	2015 : Tobias J. Kippenberg, honored for his research on the interaction of Laser light with micro- and nanomechanical systems.
2014 : Hans Jakob Wörner, honored for his research in the field of physical chemistry, in particular for his pioneering studies of the electron movement in molecules at the subfemto second time scale.	2013 : Robert Huber (physicist), honored for the development of the Fourier domain mode locked laser and its application to biomedical imaging, improving the performance of optical coherence tomography.
2012 : Tobias Ritter, honored for his accomplishments in organometallic chemistry, and the late-stage fluorination of biomedically relevant molecules.	2011 : Dieter Braun (physicist), honored for his studies in the field of biophysics, especially for developing experiments on synthetic evolution and on biophysical applications of thermophoresis.
2010 : Stefan Hecht, honored for his work in the field of functional organic nanostructures and of photo-switchable units.	2009 : Volker Springel, honored for his work in computational astrophysics, in particular, on the formation of galaxies and supermassive black holes.
2008 : Frank Neese, honored for his work on the development of ORCA – a program package for highly efficient calculation of the electronic structure of large molecules.	2007 : Martin Zwierlein, honored for his observation of superfluidity in ultracold fermionic gases.
2006 : Ingo Krossing, honored for his work on synthesis and application of novel, weakly coordinating anions.	2005 : Markus Greiner, honored for his work on quantum physics of atomic Bose-Einstein condensates in optical lattice potentials, as well as Bose-Einstein condensation of molecular and fermionic quantum gases.
2004 : Peter H. Seeberger, honored for his work at the interface between synthetic organic chemistry and biology in the development of automated solid phase synthesis of complex carbohydrates.	2003 : Joachim P. Spatz, honored for his biophysical research on the adhesion and mechanics of cells.
2002 : Thomas Tuschl, honored for his discovery and development of the RNA interference method.	2001 : Jan Hendrik Schön, prize withdrawn in 2002.
2000 : Matthias Driess, honored for his work in the field of main group chemistry, especially of phosphorus, silicon and sodium.	1999 : Roland Ketzmerick, honored for his work on nonlinear dynamics in low-dimensional electronic systems.
1998 : Michael Famulok, honored for his work on the structure and function of ribonucleic acids with high affinity.	1997 : Stephan Schiller, honored for his work in quantum optics, in particular in quantum tomography (complete reconstruction of quantum states) and low-noise measurements using highly squeezed light (quantum-nondemolition).
1996 : Carsten Bolm, honored for his work on metal-mediated enantioselective oxidations in organic synthesis.	1995 : Thomas Elsässer, honored for his work on ultrafast dynamics in molecules and semiconductors.
1994 : Wolfgang Schnick, honored for his work on the synthesis and structure determination within the nitrogen-phosphorus system.	1993 : Karl Dieter Weiss, honored for his work on novel electronic phenomena in semiconductor devices, in which the free movement of electrons is changed by artificial periodic structures (Weiss oscillators).
1992 : Stefan Jentsch, honored for his work on the ubiquitin-dependent proteolysis.	1991 : Hermann Nicolai, honored for his work on quantum field theory.
1990 : Klaus Rademann, honored for his work on the transition of isolated metal atoms to metallic solids.	1989 : Gisela Schütz, honored for her studies of magnetism with circularly polarized synchrotron radiation.
1988 : Gerhard Bringmann, honored for his work on the isolation, structure determination and synthesis of acetogenic isoquinoline alkaloids.	1987 : Johannes Georg Bednorz, honored for his discovery of a new class of superconductors with unprecedented high transition temperatures. – Nobel Prize 1987 along with Karl Alex Müller
1986 : Hartmut Michel, honored for his work on the crystallization and structure determination of the photosynthesis system I. – Nobel Prize 1988 along with Johann Deisenhofer and Robert Huber	1985 : Horst Störmer, honored for the discovery of the fractional quantum Hall effect. – Nobel Prize 1998 along with Daniel Chee Tsui and Robert B. Laughlin
1984 : Martin Quack, honored for his work on the interpretation of kinetic phenomena at the molecular level.	1983 : Gerd Binnig, honored for his contribution to the development of the scanning tunneling microscope. – Nobel Prize 1986 along with Heinrich Rohrer
1982 : Wolfgang A. Herrmann, honored for his work in organometallic chemistry.	1981 : Gerhard Mack, honored for his work on scales and conformal invariance and on the lattice gauge theory.
1980 : Helmut Schwarz, honored for his work in physical organic chemistry, particularly for chemistry in the mass spectrometer.	1979 : Theodor W. Hänsch, honored for the construction of the first narrowband tunable dye laser, the development of Doppler-free laser spectroscopy and the invention of laser cooling of atomic gases. – Nobel Prize 2005 along with Roy J. Glauber and John Lewis Hall

From 1973 to 1978, the Otto Klung Foundation acting alone and trying to foster young academics presented the Otto-Klung-Award as a Junior Researcher Prize for outstanding scientific achievement to graduate students and postdoctoral students of the Free University of Berlin, Departments of Chemistry and Physics:

Klaus-Peter Dinse (Physics 1973), Wolf-Dietrich Hunnius and Rolf Minkwitz (Chemistry 1974), Michael Grunze (Chemistry 1975), Günther Kerker (Physics 1976), Wolfgang Lubitz (Chemistry 1977), Andreas Gaupp (Physics 1978).

== See also ==
- List of chemistry awards
- List of physics awards
