= Rempe =

Rempe may refer to:

- Gerhard Rempe (born 1956), German physicist
- Jim Rempe (born 1947), American pool player
- Lasse Rempe (born 1978), German mathematician
- Matt Rempe (born 2002), Canadian ice hockey player
