= Artur Ekert =

British-Polish physicist (born 1961)

Artur Ekert FRS
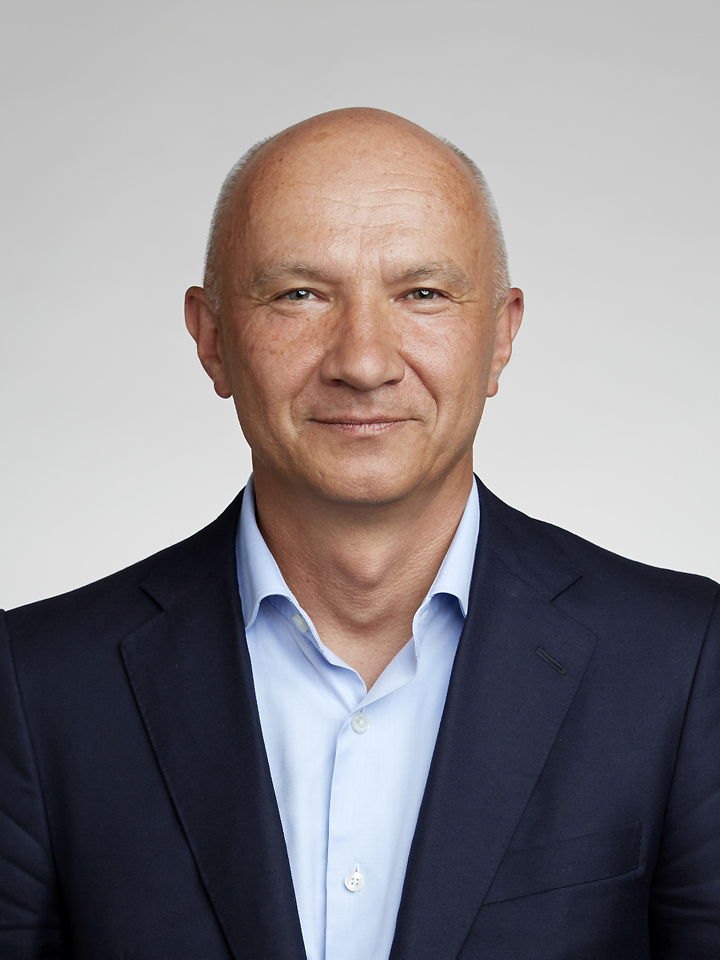
- Ekert in 2016
- Born: Artur Konrad Ekert; 19 September 1961 (age 65); Wrocław, Poland
- Education: Jagiellonian University (MSc); University of Oxford (PhD)
- Known for: Quantum cryptography E91 protocol Swap test Quantum entanglement swapping
- Awards: Maxwell Medal and Prize (1995); Descartes Prize (2004); Hughes Medal (2007); Fellow of the Royal Society (2016); Micius Quantum Prize (2019); Clarivate Citation Laureate (2019); Milner Award (2024)
- Scientific career
- Fields: Physics; Cryptography
- Workplaces: Merton College, Oxford; University of Oxford; National University of Singapore
- Thesis: Correlations in quantum optics (1991)
- Doctoral advisor: Keith Burnett; David Deutsch; Peter Knight
- Doctoral students: Patrick Hayden; Michele Mosca
- Website: Official website

Artur Konrad Ekert FRS (born 19 September 1961) is a British-Polish physicist. He is a professor of quantum physics at the Mathematical Institute, University of Oxford, professorial fellow in quantum physics and cryptography at Merton College, Oxford, Lee Kong Chian Centennial Professor at the National University of Singapore and the founding director of the Centre for Quantum Technologies (CQT). His research interests extend over most aspects of information processing in quantum-mechanical systems, with a focus on quantum communication and quantum computation. He is best known as one of the pioneers of quantum cryptography.

== Early life ==
Ekert was born in Wrocław, and studied physics at the Jagiellonian University in Kraków and at the University of Oxford. Between 1987 and 1991 he was a graduate student at Wolfson College, Oxford. In his doctoral thesis he showed how quantum entanglement and non-locality can be used to distribute cryptographic keys with perfect security.

== Career ==
In 1991, he was elected a junior research fellow and subsequently (1994) a research fellow at Merton College, Oxford. At the time, he established the first research group in quantum cryptography and computation, based in the Clarendon Laboratory, Oxford. Subsequently, it evolved into the Centre for Quantum Computation, now based at Faculty of Mathematics, University of Cambridge in Cambridge.

Between 1993 and 2000, he held a position of the Royal Society Howe Fellow. In 1998 he was appointed a professor of physics at the University of Oxford and a fellow and tutor in physics at Keble College, Oxford. From 2002 until 2006 he was the Leigh-Trapnell Professor of Quantum Physics at the Department of Applied Mathematics and Theoretical Physics, Cambridge University and a professorial fellow of King's College, Cambridge. Since 2006 he has been a professor of quantum physics at the Mathematical Institute, University of Oxford. Also in 2006 he was appointed a Lee Kong Chian Centennial Professor at the National University of Singapore and became the founding director of the Centre for Quantum Technologies (CQT). After retiring from the director position in 2020, he remains a Distinguished Fellow at CQT. In 2020, he joined the Okinawa Institute of Science and Technology as an adjunct professor.

He has worked with and advised several companies and government agencies, served on various professional advisory boards, and is the Vice Chairman of The Noel Croucher Foundation.

== Research ==
Ekert's research extends over most aspects of information processing in quantum-mechanical systems, with a focus on quantum cryptography and quantum computation. Building on the idea of quantum non-locality and Bell's inequalities he introduced entanglement-based quantum key distribution. His 1991 paper generated a spate of new research that established a vigorously active new area of physics and cryptography. It is one of the most cited papers in the field and was chosen by the editors of the Physical Review Letters as one of their "milestone letters", i.e., papers that made important contributions to physics, announced significant discoveries, or started new areas of research. His subsequent work with John Rarity and Paul Tapster, from the Defence Research Agency (DRA) in Malvern, resulted in the proof-of-principle experimental quantum key distribution, introducing parametric down-conversion, phase encoding, and quantum interferometry into the repertoire of cryptography. He and collaborators were the first to develop the concept of a security proof based on entanglement purification.

Ekert and colleagues have made a number of contributions to both theoretical aspects of quantum computation and proposals for its experimental realisations. These include proving that almost any quantum logic gate operating on two quantum bits is universal, proposing one of the first realistic implementations of quantum computation, e.g. using the induced dipole-dipole coupling in an optically driven array of quantum dots, introducing more stable geometric quantum logic gates, and proposing "noiseless encoding", which became later known as decoherence-free subspaces.

His other notable contributions include work on quantum state swapping, optimal quantum state estimation and quantum state transfer. With some of the same collaborators, he has written on connections between the notion of mathematical proofs and the laws of physics. He has also contributed semi-popular writing on the history of science.

== Honours and awards ==
For his discovery of quantum cryptography he was awarded the 1995 Maxwell Medal and Prize by the Institute of Physics, the 2007 Hughes Medal by the Royal Society, the 2019 Micius Quantum Prize and the 2024 Royal Society Milner Award. He is also a co-recipient of the 2004 European Union Descartes Prize. In 2016 he was elected a Fellow of the Royal Society. He is a fellow of the Singapore National Academy of Science and a recipient of the 2017 Singapore Public Administration Medal (Silver) Pingat Pentadbiran Awam. He is a foreign member of the Polish Academy of Arts and Sciences. In 2025 he was awarded the Commander's Cross of the Order of Polonia Restituta.
