= Atom laser =

Propagating atomic wave

An atom laser is a coherent state of propagating atoms. They are created out of a Bose–Einstein condensate of atoms that are output coupled using various techniques. Much like an optical laser, an atom laser is a coherent beam that behaves like a wave.

== Terminology ==
There has been some argument that the term "atom laser" is misleading. Indeed, "laser" stands for light amplification by stimulated emission of radiation, which is not particularly related to the physical object called an atom laser, and perhaps describes more accurately the Bose–Einstein condensate (BEC). The terminology most widely used in the community today is to distinguish between the BEC, typically obtained by evaporation in a conservative trap, from the atom laser itself, which is a propagating atomic wave obtained by extraction from a previously realized BEC. Some ongoing experimental research tries to obtain directly an atom laser from a "hot" beam of atoms without making a trapped BEC first.

== Introduction ==
The first pulsed atom laser was demonstrated at MIT by Professor Wolfgang Ketterle et al. in November 1996. Ketterle used an isotope of sodium and used an oscillating magnetic field as their output coupling technique, letting gravity pull off partial pieces looking much like a dripping tap (See movie in External Links).

From the creation of the first atom laser there has been a surge in the recreation of atom lasers along with different techniques for output coupling and in general research. The current developmental stage of the atom laser is analogous to that of the optical laser during its discovery in the 1960s. To that effect the equipment and techniques are in their earliest developmental phases and still strictly in the domain of research laboratories.

The brightest atom laser so far has been demonstrated at IESL-FORTH, Crete, Greece.

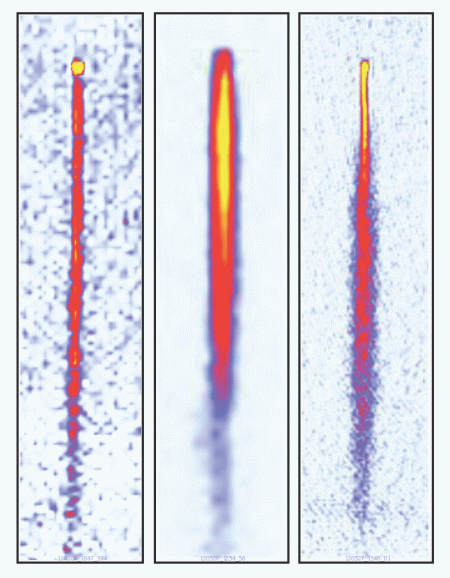
Three ultra-bright atom lasers

== Physics ==
The physics of an atom laser is similar to that of an optical laser. The main differences between an optical and an atom laser are that atoms interact with themselves, cannot be created as photons can, and possess mass whereas photons do not (atoms therefore propagate at a speed below that of light). The van der Waals interaction of atoms with surfaces makes it difficult to make the atomic mirrors, typical for conventional lasers.

A pseudo-continuously operating atom laser was demonstrated for the first time by Theodor Hänsch, Immanuel Bloch and Tilman Esslinger at the Max Planck Institute for Quantum Optics in Munich. They produced a well-controlled continuous beam spanning up to 100 ms, whereas their predecessor produced only short pulses of atoms. However, this does not constitute a continuous atom laser since the replenishing of the depleted BEC lasts approximately 100 times longer than the duration of the emission itself (i.e. the duty cycle is 1/100). Recent developments in the field have shown progress towards a continuous atom laser, namely the creation of a continuous Bose-Einstein condensate.

== Applications ==
Atom lasers are critical for atom holography. Similar to conventional holography, atom holography uses the diffraction of atoms. The De Broglie wavelength of the atoms is much smaller than the wavelength of light, so atom lasers can create much higher-resolution holographic images. Atom holography might be used to project complex integrated-circuit patterns, just a few nanometres in scale, onto semiconductors. Another application, which might also benefit from atom lasers, is atom interferometry. In an atom interferometer, an atomic wave packet is coherently split into two wave packets that follow different paths before recombining. Atom interferometers, which can be more sensitive than optical interferometers, could be used to test quantum theory, and have such high precision that they may even be able to detect changes in space-time. This is because the de Broglie wavelength of the atoms is much smaller than the wavelength of light, the atoms have mass, and because the internal structure of the atom can also be exploited.

== See also ==
- Bose–Einstein condensate
- List of laser articles
