= Centre for Quantum Computation =

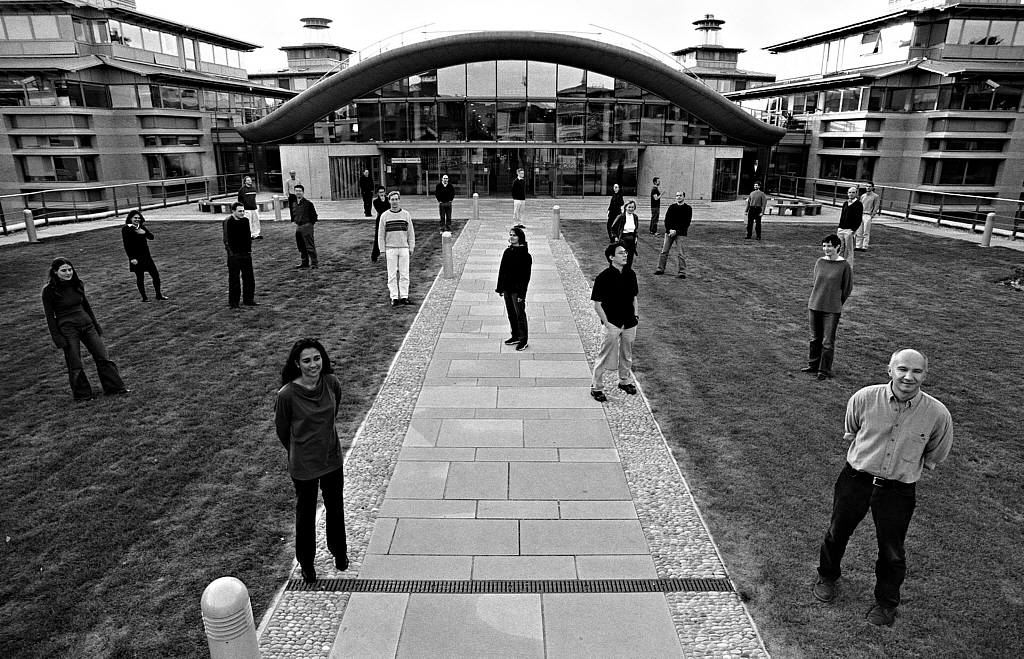
CQC group photo, Cambridge, 2003

The Centre for Quantum Computation (CQC) is an alliance of quantum information research groups at the University of Oxford. It was founded by Artur Ekert in 1998.

Until recently, the CQC also included research groups at the University of Cambridge, but now the Cambridge groups operate as an independent entity called the Cambridge Centre for Quantum Information and Foundations (CQIF).

== Research ==
The CQC conducts theoretical and experimental research into quantum computing, quantum cryptography and other forms of quantum information processing, into the implications of the quantum theory of information for physics itself, and into foundational and conceptual questions in quantum theory and quantum information theory.

== Groups ==
Initially the CQC was based at the Clarendon Laboratory, but it has now grown to span several departments at the University of Oxford:

=== Physics ===
- Atom-photon physics, group led by Axel Kuhn.
- Ion trapping, group led by Andrew Steane and David Lucas.
- Nuclear magnetic resonance, group led by Jonathan A. Jones.
- Quantum spin dynamics, group led by Arzhang Ardavan and John Morton (group spans physics and materials).
- Quantum theory, group led by Dieter Jaksch.
- Ultracold quantum matter, group led by Christopher Foot.
- Ultrafast quantum optics, group led by Ian Walmsley.

=== Materials ===
- Photonic nanomaterials, group led by Jason Smith.
- Quantum and nanotechnology theory, group led by Simon Benjamin.
- Quantum spin dynamics, group led by John Morton and Arzhang Ardavan (group spans physics and materials).

=== Computer Science ===
- Quantum Group, led by Samson Abramsky and Bob Coecke.

=== Mathematics ===
- Mathematical physics, group led by Artur Ekert.

== Origins ==
The centre has its origins in the early 1980s when the computer industry began to worry about the limits of computing. In 1981, Oxford physicist David Deutsch attended a party in Texas given by the famous American physicist John Wheeler who had invited a number of scientists interested in the foundations of computing. It was at this party that Deutsch gained the crucial insight that would lead to an entirely new branch of physics. At the time, computer scientists were turning to Newtonian physics to try to resolve certain fundamental puzzles in the field. But during a conversation at Wheeler's party, Deutsch realised that this was the wrong approach. Physics is fundamentally governed by quantum theory, and Deutsch could see immediately that using quantum theory instead of Newtonian physics would give a different result. As a consequence of this insight, Deutsch published the paper in 1985 that is now generally regarded as a classic in the field. The paper describes how a computer might run using quantum mechanics and why such a computer is fundamentally different from ordinary computers.

In 1987, Artur Ekert arrived at Oxford to work on a DPhil in physics, where he met Deutsch. Whilst working at Oxford, Ekert developed a theory of cryptography based on quantum entanglement. A chance meeting on the ski slopes of the Alps with John Rarity, a scientist at DRA (then the UK's main military research organisation), led to a collaboration in which Ekert's scheme was tested experimentally in the early 1990s. After finishing his DPhil, Ekert gained a junior research fellowship from Merton and took on his first DPhil student. With Deutsch, this created a small team that within a year had acquired the title of the Quantum Computation and Cryptography Group.

A breakthrough in 1994 by Peter Shor, a researcher at the labs of the American telecommunications giant AT&T, boosted the entire field of quantum information. Shor showed that Deutch's quantum computer could actually solve an important problem that an ordinary computer would find impossible. For the first time, it became clear that quantum computers were far from unimportant curiosities. After Shor's announcement, quantum information became increasingly popular with Oxford. In 1995, Andrew Steane began an experimental effort to study how quantum computers might be built from ionised atoms trapped by laser beams. In 1996, Jonathan Jones started a group working on a quantum computer based on the same techniques used in magnetic resonance imaging in medicine. And two years later, Dirk Bouwmeester arrived from Geneva to begin an experimental group working out how the quantum world could also revolutionise communication. The group changed its name to the Centre for Quantum Computation.

== Cambridge ==
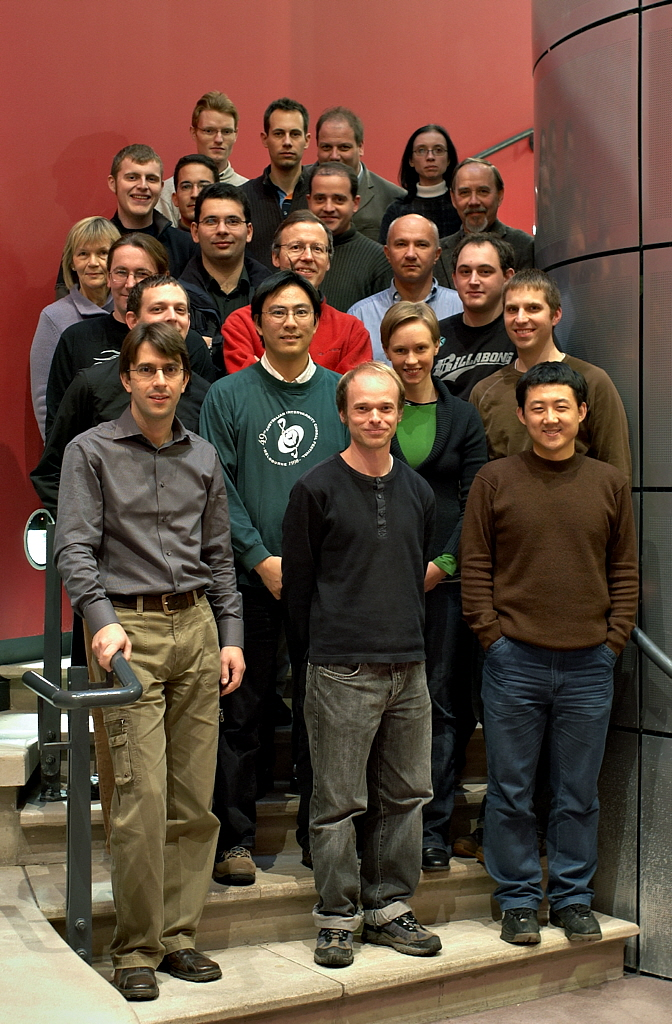
CQC group photo, Cambridge, 2006

When Artur Ekert moved to Cambridge to become the first Leigh Trapnell Professor of Quantum Physics in 2002, the Cambridge Centre for Quantum Computation was created. It continued under this name until 2010, when the existing research group was joined by Richard Jozsa, and the centre was renamed the Cambridge Centre for Quantum Information and Foundations (CQIF), reflecting the broad range of its research activities. The Cambridge CQIF is based at the Department of Applied Mathematics and Theoretical Physics (DAMTP), within the Centre for Mathematical Sciences. The Cambridge CQC's permanent faculty were Artur Ekert, Leigh Trapnell Professor of Quantum Physics at Cambridge from 2002 to 2007, and Adrian Kent, currently Reader in Quantum Physics at Cambridge. The Cambridge CQIF's permanent faculty are Richard Jozsa, Leigh Trapnell Professor from 2010, and Adrian Kent.

== See also ==
- Quantum information
- Artur Ekert
- David Deutsch
- Richard Jozsa
- University of Cambridge
- University of Oxford
- Centre for Quantum Technologies
