= Wolfgang Dür =

Austrian physicist (b. 1973)

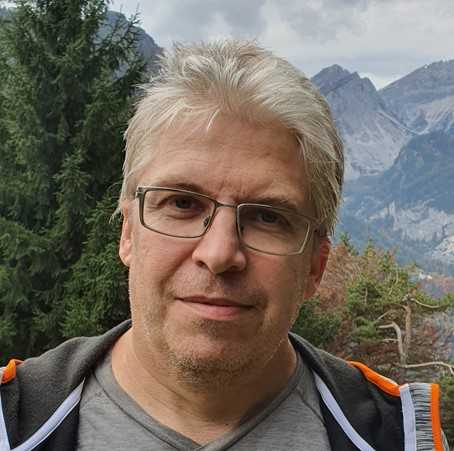
- Born: October 25, 1973 (age 53)
- Education: University of Innsbruck (PhD)
- Known for: W state
- Scientific career
- Fields: Quantum information
- Workplaces: University of Innsbruck
- Doctoral advisor: Ignacio Cirac

Wolfgang Dür (born 25 October 1973) is an Austrian theoretical physicist and conducts research in the field of quantum information theory and quantum communication. He is a full professor at the University of Innsbruck, Austria.

== Biography ==
Dür studied physics at the University of Innsbruck and earned his doctorate sub auspiciis praesidentis in 2001 under the supervision of Ignacio Cirac. Following his PhD, he pursued postdoctoral research at LMU Munich before returning to Innsbruck, where he earned his habilitation in 2008. He became full professor in 2023. He also studied physics and mathematics to become a high school teacher. He is married and has two children.

== Research and career ==
Wolfgang Dür work focuses on topics such as quantum networks, quantum metrology, and measurement-based quantum computation. Dür is well-known for his contributions to the development of quantum repeaters, a key concept for enabling quantum communication over long distances. Alongside collaborators such as Hans Briegel, Ignacio Cirac, and Peter Zoller, he provided the theoretical foundation for using quantum repeaters to establish global quantum networks.

Dür is also widely recognized for his research on multipartite entanglement. He co-introduced the W state, a specific class of multipartite entangled states named after him, which are notable for their distinct properties and practical applications in quantum information theory. These states are critical in scenarios requiring robustness against particle loss and feature prominently in studies of distributed quantum systems.

In addition to his research, he has been dedicated to mentoring the next generation of quantum physicists. He is responsible for teacher education at the University of Innsbruck since 2011. His commitment to education extends to developing innovative approaches for teaching quantum mechanics to high school and undergraduate students. Beyond academia, he actively engages in didactics and science outreach, simplifying quantum technologies for broader audiences and inspiring public interest in quantum advancements.

== Awards ==
- Marie-Curie individual fellowship of the European Union 2001.
- APART fellowship of Austrian Academy of Sciences 2003.
- Felix Kuschenitz award 2007 of Austrian Academy of Sciences
- Outstanding referee award of the American Physical Society 2009.
