= Stefan Jentsch =

German cell biologist

Stefan Jentsch (29 May 1955 – 29 October 2016) was a German cell biologist. He was a director at the Max Planck Institute of Biochemistry in Martinsried, Germany. He is known for his pioneering work in the field of protein modifications by ubiquitin and ubiquitin-like modifiers.

== Life ==
Jentsch was born in Berlin and studied biology at the Free University of Berlin, where he also obtained his Diplom in 1979. He then completed his Ph.D. at the Max Planck Institute for Molecular Genetics in Berlin in 1983.

After his Ph.D., he joined the laboratory of Alexander Varshavsky at the Massachusetts Institute of Technology. In 1988 he returned to Germany, becoming a junior group leader at the Friedrich Miescher Laboratory of the Max Planck Society in Tübingen in 1988 and then professor at the Center of Molecular Biology (ZMBH), University of Heidelberg in 1993. From 1998 until his death he was a director of the Department of Molecular Cell Biology, the Max Planck Institute of Biochemistry in Martinsried. Jentsch died in Munich on 29 October 2016.

== Prizes and awards ==
- 1992 Otto Klung Prize for Chemistry
- 1993 Gottfried Wilhelm Leibniz Prize
- 1996 Otto Bayer Award
- 2003 Max-Planck Research Award
- 2006 Honorary Professorship of Fudan University
- 2011 Louis-Jeantet Prize for Medicine
- 2017 Otto Warburg Medal
