= Magic wavelength =

Magic wavelength

The magic wavelength (also known as a related quantity, magic frequency) is the wavelength of an optical lattice where the polarizabilities of two atomic clock states have the same value, such that the AC Stark shift caused by the laser intensity fluctuation has no effect on the transition frequency between the two clock states.

== AC Stark shift by optical lattice ==
The laser field in an optical lattice induces an electric dipole moment in the atoms to exert forces on them and hence confine them. However, the difference in polarizabilities of the atomic states leads to an AC Stark shift in the transition frequency between the two states, a shift that is dependent on the laser optical intensity at the particular atom location in the lattice. When it comes to precise measurements of transition frequency such as atomic clocks, the temporal fluctuations of the laser optical intensity would then deteriorate the clock accuracy. Furthermore, due to the spatial variation of laser intensity in the lattice, the atom's motion within the lattice would also be coupled into the uncertainty of the internal transition frequency of the atom.

== Polarizability depends on wavelength ==
Despite having different functional forms, the polarizabilities of two atomic states do have a dependency on the wavelength of the laser field. In some cases, it is then possible to find a particular wavelength at which the two atomic states happen to have exactly the same polarizability. This particular wavelength, where the AC Stark shift vanishes for the transition frequency, is called the magic wavelength, and the frequency that corresponds to this wavelength is called the magic frequency. This idea was first introduced by Hidetoshi Katori's calculation in 2003, and then experimentally achieved by Katori's group in 2003.

== Application of magic wavelength ==
The idea of a magic wavelength is significant in various areas of physics, especially where exact control of atoms, molecules, or particles is essential.

=== Optical lattice clock ===
Tight confinement of neutral atoms, such as ytterbium and strontium, enables them to stay localized without decoherence for more extended periods, thereby nullifying the Doppler and recoil effects. This makes them good candidates for optical lattice clocks, provided the frequency shifts are properly controlled. At an operational magic wavelength, the frequency shifts become insensitive to changes in trap depth, preventing the degradation of clock accuracy.

=== Precision measurement ===
Atomic transitions near magic frequencies elongate the interaction time without broadening transitions, as well as increasing their sensitivity. This, in turn, reduces line-pulling and systematic shifts in fundamental physics tests, helping in the search for fundamental constant variations without any influence of external factors like trap depth modulation. Transition near a magic wavelength enables the clock to perform with an accuracy better than 10^{−18} uncertainty level.

=== Optical tweezers ===
To apply precise and localized optical forces to tightly trap individual atoms (or particles) in free space, one can use instruments with highly focused laser beams, called optical tweezers. to trap individual atoms (or particles) in free space. At the magic wavelength, the internal transition frequency becomes independent of the trap depth, cancelling differential light shifts, enabling coherent control and quantum operations on trapped atoms, which are critical for quantum computing, quantum simulation, and atomic clocks.

=== Optical cooling and trapping technique ===
When the far-off-resonant optical dipole traps (ODTs) or optical lattices utilize intense laser beams to trap atoms in light-induced potential wells, the AC Stark effect shifts atomic energy levels, which unequally shift the ground and excited states by the trap light. Laser cooling on the weakly allowed narrow intercombination transition between singlet and triplet states with long excited-state lifetime and high frequency stability could achieve better results for atoms in an optical dipole trap when the trap wavelength is tuned near the magic wavelength.
