= Viktoria Däschlein-Gessner =

German chemist

- Born: 1982 (age 43–44)
- Education: Technical University of Dortmund; University of Würzburg
- Scientific career
- Workplaces: University of California, Berkeley; Ruhr University Bochum; University of Würzburg
- Thesis: Lithiumorganische Verbindungen von der Struktur-Reaktivitätsbeziehung zu vielseitigen Synthesebausteinen und ihrer Anwendung (2009)

Viktoria Däschlein-Gessner (born 1982) is a German chemist who is the Chair of Inorganic Chemistry II at Ruhr University Bochum. Her research considers organometallic chemistry and catalysis. She has developed ylidic ligands to stabilise reactive main group compounds.

== Early life and education ==
Gessner was born in Würzburg. Her high school teacher told her not to study chemistry as it was "not for women,". In 2002, she began undergraduate studies in chemistry at the Philipps University of Marburg, but after a few years moved to the University of Würzburg. She moved to Technical University of Dortmund for doctoral research, working in the laboratory of Carsten Strohmann on organolithium reagents. She was a postdoctoral researcher at the University of California, Berkeley, where she worked alongside Don Tilley. She eventually returned to the Julius Maximilian University in Würzburg, where she worked with Holger Braunschweig.

== Research and career ==
In 2012, Gessner founded her own research group, supported by the German Research Foundation Emmy Noether program. In 2016, she was appointed Professor at the Ruhr University Bochum. Her research considered the development of ligan systems with novel bonding properties.

Gessner has studied Ylide chemistry. She developed YPhos ligands, which can offer high versatility in catalysis systems. These ligands have a negatively charged carbon atom next to a phosphorus, making the ligands uniquely rich in electrons. In coupling chemistry (e.g. C–C and C–H), monoligated palladium YPhos complexes can improve activity, and gold catalysis with YPhos ligands can drive hydroamination reactions.

== Awards and honours ==
- 2008 DSM South Science and Technology Award
- 2008 European Young Chemists Award Silver Medal
- 2009 DSM North Science and Technology Award
- 2009 Dissertation Award of TU Dortmund
- 2010 IUPAC Prize for Young Researchers in Chemistry
- 2011 Alexander von Humboldt Foundation Feodor Lynen Return Scholarship
- 2012 Helene Lange Prize
- 2012 Emmy Noether Scholarship
- 2013 Dr. Otto-Röhm Memorial Foundation Prize
- 2014 Exploration scholarship of the Boehringer-Ingelheim Foundation
- 2014 X-ray award for young scientists at the University of Würzburg
- 2015 ADUC Award for Habilitants
- 2016 Thieme Journal Award
- 2016 European Research Council Starting Grant
- 2020 Organometallics Distinguished Author Award
- 2022 Klung Wilhelmy Science Award 2022

== Selected publications ==
- Däschlein, Viktoriya Viktoria; Christian Däschlein; Strohmann, Carsten (2009). "Structure formation principles and reactivity of organolithium compounds". Chemistry: A European Journal. 15 (14): 3320–3334. doi:10.1002/chem.200900041. PMID 19260001. Wikidata Q56335207.
- Braunschweig, Holger; Rian D Dewhurst; Däschlein, Viktoriya Viktoria (2013). "Transition metal borylene complexes". Chemical Society Reviews. 42 (8): 3197–3208. doi:10.1039/c3cs35510a. PMID 23403460. Wikidata Q38081024.
- Matthieu Willot; Lea Radtke; Daniel Könning; Roland Fröhlich; Däschlein, Viktoriya Viktoria; Strohmann, Carsten; Christmann, Mathias (2009). "Total synthesis and absolute configuration of the guaiane sesquiterpene englerin A". Angewandte Chemie International Edition. 48 (48): 9105–9108. doi:10.1002/anie.200905032. PMID 19882614. Wikidata Q43250698.
