= Optical lattice clock =

Type of atomic clock

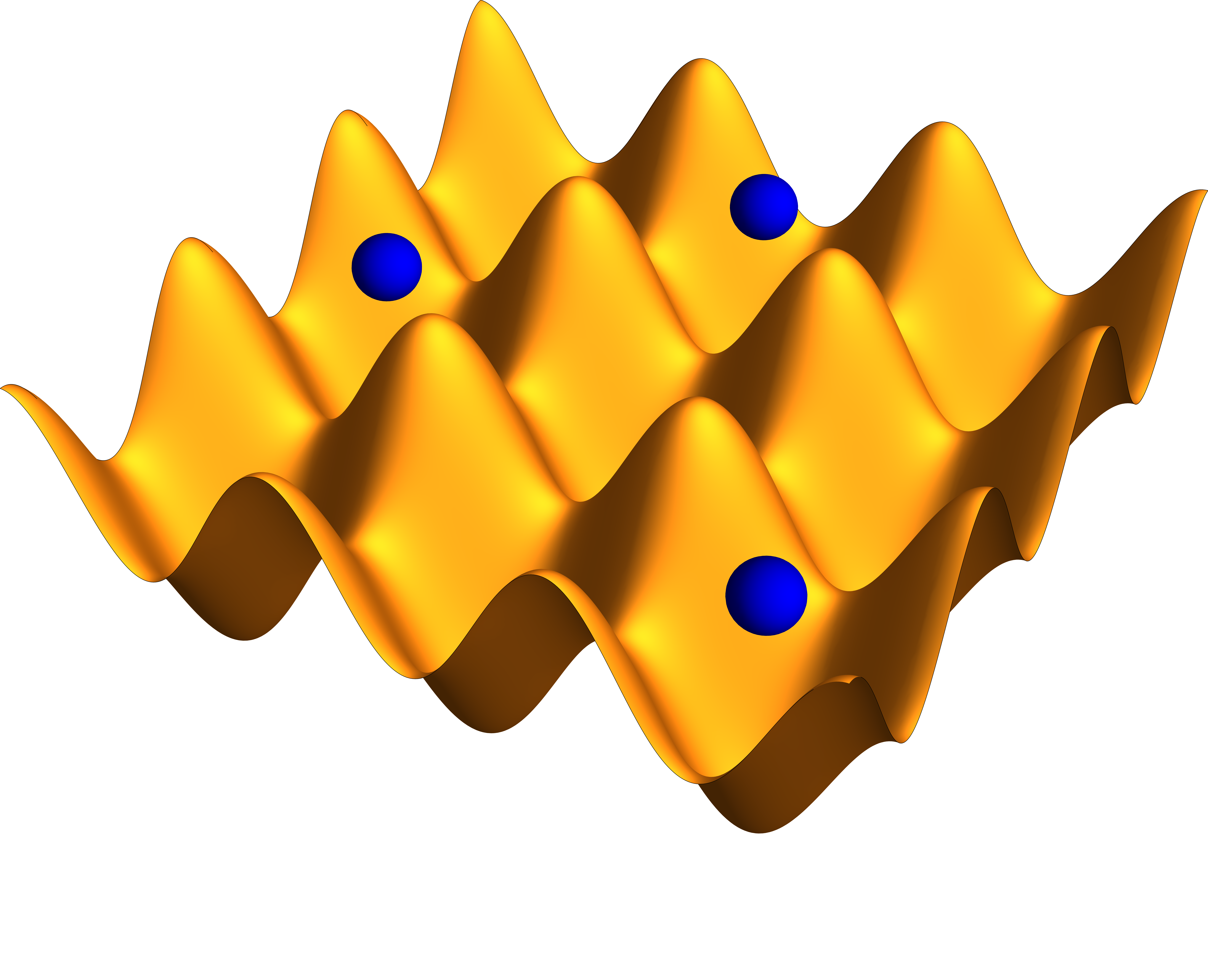
Optical lattice. Atoms (represented as blue spheres) pictured in a 2D lattice potential (represented as the yellow surface).

In atomic, molecular, and optical (AMO) physics, an optical lattice clock is a type of atomic clock that uses neutral atoms confined in an optical lattice, which is a periodic array of laser light, as its timekeeping reference. In these clocks, strontium (Sr) or ytterbium (Yb) atoms are cooled to nearly absolute zero and held in place by intersecting laser beams forming a stable egg-carton-like pattern of light. The atoms' ultra-narrow optical frequency transitions work as the clock's ticking signal, with frequencies much higher than those used for conventional cesium atomic clocks. In the case of strontium, the frequency is approximately 429 trillion Hz. This higher frequency allows optical lattice clocks to divide time into much finer intervals. By probing thousands of trapped atoms simultaneously and averaging their synchronised oscillations, optical lattice clocks achieve extraordinary stability and accuracy. Due to their accuracy, they are considered prime candidates for a future redefinition of the second in the International System of Units (SI). For example, a cesium clock (the current SI standard) might drift by a second in about 30 million years, whereas a strontium optical lattice clock would drift only about one second over 30 billion years.

== History ==
The concept of the optical lattice clock was first proposed in 2001 by Hidetoshi Katori at the School of Engineering, University of Tokyo (UTokyo). Katori recognised that trapping neutral atoms in a laser lattice at a magic wavelength could provide a superior frequency reference, and he is credited with building the world’s first optical lattice clock in 2003 using strontium atoms. In this experiment conducted by Katori's group at UTokyo, strontium atoms were confined in a one-dimensional optical lattice and probed on an ultra-narrow optical transition, proving the viability of the concept. Katori’s group showed that the lattice-confined atoms exhibited dramatically reduced motion-induced shifts and introduced the magic wavelength technique to cancel out lattice-induced perturbations. This work, along with a 2005 Nature publication of a Sr lattice clock achieving much better precision by a group led by Masao Takamoto at Riken, laid the foundation for optical lattice clock research. Since the invention of the optical lattice clock, scientists in several countries have built versions using different atoms. In 2006, a group led by Jun Ye and Andrew Ludlow at the National Institute of Standards and Technology (NIST) completed their own version of the optical lattice clock.

== Commercial prototypes ==
Early optical lattice clocks were confined to physics laboratories, often occupying several optical tables due to the complexity of lasers and equipment, including ultra-stable lasers, vacuum chambers, laser cooling systems, and frequency combs. In recent years, portable optical lattice clocks about the size of an appliance have been developed and tested outside the lab. In March 2025, Shimadzu, which had been working with Katori's group since 2017, announced it had started selling the world's first commercial version of the clock for 500 million yen (US$3.3 million at the time of the announcement) per unit.

== See also ==
- Optical lattice
- Optical clock
