= Eleftherios Goulielmakis =

Greek physicist specializing in lasers (born 1975)

- Ελευθέριος Γουλιελμάκης
- Born: May 18, 1975 (age 51); Heraklion, Crete, Greece
- Education: LMU Munich; University of Crete
- Scientific career
- Fields: Attosecond physics Ultrafast optics
- Workplaces: University of Rostock, Max Planck Institute of Quantum Optics, Technical University of Vienna

Eleftherios Goulielmakis (Ελευθέριος Γουλιελμάκης) is a Greek physicist specializing in lasers. He is a professor of physics at the University of Rostock, Germany where he currently leads the research activities of the Extreme Photonics group. Previously, he was the head of the research group "Attoelectronics" at the Max Planck Institute of Quantum Optics in Garching, Germany.

== Biography ==
He obtained his Bachelor's and Master's degree in physics and optoelectronics respectively from the University of Crete, Greece and the PhD degree (Dr. rer. nat.) from LMU Munich in 2005.

For his work on the attosecond control and synthesis of light waves he has been awarded the Georgios Foteinos Prize of the Academy of Athens in 2007, the International Union of Pure and Applied Physics Young Scientist Prize in Optics of the International Commission for Optics in 2009, the Gustav Hertz Prize of the Deutsche Physikalische Gesellschaft (DPG) in 2013. and the Röntgen Prize of the University of Giessen in 2015.

== Selected recent works ==
- Hassan, M. Th.; Luu, T. T.; Moulet, A.; Raskazovskaya, O.; Zhokhov, P.; Garg, M.; Karpowicz, N.; Zheltikov, A. M.; Pervak, V. (2016). "Optical attosecond pulses and tracking the nonlinear response of bound electrons". Nature. 530 (7588): 66–70. doi:10.1038/nature16528. ISSN 0028-0836. PMID 26842055. S2CID 205247338.
- Moulet, A.; Bertrand, J. B.; Klostermann, T.; Guggenmos, A.; Karpowicz, N.; Goulielmakis, E. (2017-09-15). "Soft x-ray excitonics". Science. 357 (6356): 1134–1138. doi:10.1126/science.aan4737. ISSN 0036-8075. PMID 28912241.
- Luu, T. T.; Garg, M.; Kruchinin, S. Yu.; Moulet, A.; Hassan, M. Th.; Goulielmakis, E. (2015). "Extreme ultraviolet high-harmonic spectroscopy of solids". Nature. 521 (7553): 498–502. doi:10.1038/nature14456. ISSN 0028-0836. PMID 26017451. S2CID 205243793.
- Wirth, A.; Hassan, M. T.; Grguras, I.; Gagnon, J.; Moulet, A.; Luu, T. T.; Pabst, S.; Santra, R.; Alahmed, Z. A. (2011-10-14). "Synthesized Light Transients". Science. 334 (6053): 195–200. doi:10.1126/science.1210268. ISSN 0036-8075. PMID 21903778. S2CID 43113183.
- Garg, M.; Zhan, M.; Luu, T. T.; Lakhotia, H.; Klostermann, T.; Guggenmos, A.; Goulielmakis, E. (2016). "Multi-petahertz electronic metrology". Nature. 538 (7625): 359–363. doi:10.1038/nature19821. ISSN 0028-0836. PMID 27762353. S2CID 205251231.
