= Quantum logic spectroscopy =

Ion control scheme

Quantum logic spectroscopy (QLS) is an ion control scheme that maps quantum information between two co-trapped ion species. Quantum logic operations allow desirable properties of each ion species to be utilized simultaneously. This enables work with ions and molecular ions that have complex internal energy level structures which preclude laser cooling and direct manipulation of state. QLS was first demonstrated by NIST in 2005. QLS was first applied to state detection in diatomic molecules in 2016 by Wolf et al, and later applied to state manipulation and detection of diatomic molecules by the Liebfried group at NIST in 2017

== Overview ==
Lasers are used to couple each ion's internal and external motional degrees of freedom. The Coulomb interaction between the two ions couples their motion. This allows the internal state of one ion to be transferred to the other. An auxiliary "logic ion" provides cooling, state preparation, and state detection for the co-trapped "spectroscopy ion," which has an electronic transition of interest. The logic ion is used to sense and control the internal and external state of the spectroscopy ion.

The logic ion is selected to have a simple energy level structure that can be directly laser cooled, often an alkaline earth ion. The laser cooled logic ion provides sympathetic cooling to the spectroscopy ion, which lacks an efficient laser cooling scheme. Cooling the spectroscopy ion reduces the number of rotational and vibrational states that it can occupy. The remaining states are then accessed by driving stimulated Raman spectroscopy transitions with a laser. The light used for driving these transitions is far off-resonant from any electronic transitions. This enables control over the spectroscopy ion's rotational and vibrational state.

Thus far, QLS is limited to diatomic molecules with a mass within 1 AMU of the laser cooled "logic" ion. This is largely due to poorer coupling of the motional states of the occupants of the ion trap as the mass mismatch becomes larger. Other techniques more tolerant of large mass mismatches are better suited to cases where the ultimate resolution of QLS is not needed, but single-molecule sensitivity is still desired.

== State transfer protocol ==
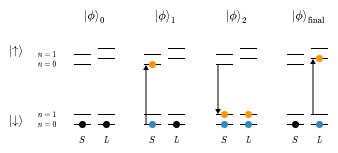
State transfer protocol for quantum logic spectroscopy. Population with amplitude $\alpha$ is represented in blue and $\beta$ in yellow.

The internal states of each ion can be treated as a two level system, with eigenstates denoted $| \uparrow\ \rangle,$ and $| \downarrow\ \rangle$. One of the ion's normal modes is chosen to be the transfer mode used for state mapping. This motional mode must be shared by both ions, which requires both ions be similar in mass. The normal mode has harmonic oscillator states denoted as $| n \rangle_m$, where n is the nth level of mode m. The wave function

$$| \phi\ \rangle_{0} =  | \downarrow\ \rangle_S | \downarrow\ \rangle_L | 0 \rangle_m ,$$

denotes both ions and the transfer mode in the ground state. S and L represent the spectroscopy and logic ion. The spectroscopy ion's spectroscopy transition is then excited with a laser, producing the state:

$$| \phi\ \rangle_{1} = (\alpha\ | \downarrow\ \rangle_S + \beta\ | \uparrow\ \rangle_S) | \downarrow\ \rangle_L | 0 \rangle_m = (\alpha\ | \downarrow\ \rangle_S | 0 \rangle_m + \beta\ | \uparrow\ \rangle_S | 0 \rangle_m) | \downarrow\ \rangle_L$$

A red sideband pi-pulse is then driven on the spectroscopy ion, resulting in the state:

$$| \phi\ \rangle_{2} = (\alpha\ | \downarrow\ \rangle_S | 0 \rangle_m + \beta\ | \downarrow\ \rangle_S| 1 \rangle_m) | \downarrow\ \rangle_L = | \downarrow\ \rangle_S | \downarrow\ \rangle_L (\alpha\ | 0 \rangle_m + \beta\ | 1 \rangle_m)$$

At this stage, the spectroscopy ion's internal state has been mapped on to the transfer mode. The internal state of the ion has been coupled to its motional mode. The $| \downarrow\ \rangle_S | 0 \rangle_m$ state is unaffected by the pulse of light carrying out this operation because the state $| \uparrow\ \rangle_S | -1 \rangle_m$ does not exist. QLS takes advantage of this in order to map the spectroscopy ion's state onto the transfer mode. A final red sideband pi-pulse is applied to the logic ion, resulting in the state:

$$| \phi\ \rangle_\text{final} =  | \downarrow\ \rangle_S (\alpha\ | \downarrow\ \rangle_L + \beta\ | \uparrow\ \rangle_L) | 0 \rangle_m$$

The spectroscopy ion's initial state has been mapped onto the logic ion, which can then be detected.
