= Ignacio Cirac =

Spanish theoretical physicist

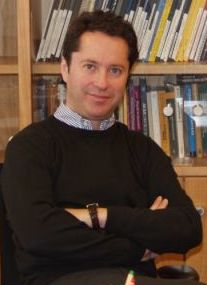
- Born: Juan Ignacio Cirac Sasturain; October 11, 1965 (age 61); Manresa, Barcelona, Spain
- Education: Complutense University of Madrid
- Known for: Trapped ion quantum computer Quantum network models Cirac–Zoller CNOT; W state Tensor network states
- Awards: Prince of Asturias Award (2006); BBVA Foundation Frontiers of Knowledge Award (2008); Benjamin Franklin Medal (2010); Wolf Prize in Physics (2013); Max Planck Medal (2018); Micius Quantum Prize (2018); John Stewart Bell Prize (2019); Premio Innovación (Innovation Award) in the Premios Vanguardia (2023); ICTP-IBM Richard Feynman Prize in Quantum Computing (2026); Isaac Newton Medal (2026)
- Scientific career
- Fields: Physicist
- Workplaces: Max Planck Institute of Quantum Optics
- Thesis: Interaction of two-level atoms with non-classical states of light (1991)
- Doctoral advisor: Luis Lorenzo Sánchez Soto
- Doctoral students: Wolfgang Dür
- Other notable students: Frank Verstraete, Guifré Vidal, Silke Weinfurtner

Juan Ignacio Cirac Sasturain (born 11 October 1965), known professionally as Ignacio Cirac, is a Spanish physicist. He is one of the pioneers of the field of quantum computing and quantum information theory. He was awarded the 2013 Wolf Prize in Physics.

== Early life and education ==
Juan Ignacio Cirac Sasturain graduated from the Complutense University of Madrid in 1988.

== Career ==
Cirac moved to the United States in 1991 to work as a postdoctoral scientist with Peter Zoller in the Joint Institute for Laboratory Astrophysics in University of Colorado at Boulder. Between 1991 and 1996, he was teaching physics in the Ciudad Real Faculty of Chemistry, University of Castilla-La Mancha.

In 1996, Cirac became professor in the Institut für Theoretische Physik in Innsbruck, Austria, and in 2001 he became a director of the Max Planck Institute of Quantum Optics in Garching, Germany, where he heads the Theory Division. At the same time, he was appointed honorary professor at the Technical University of Munich.

He is a distinguished visiting professor and research advisor at ICFO – the Institute of Photonic Sciences in Barcelona since its foundation in 2002. He has been a member of research teams at the universities of Harvard, Technical University of Munich, Hamburg, UCSB, Hannover, Bristol, Paris, CEA/Saclay, École Normale Supérieure, Massachusetts Institute of Technology.

His research is focused on quantum optics, the quantum theory of information, and quantum many-body physics. His joint work with Peter Zoller on ion trap quantum computation opened up the possibility of experimental quantum computation, and his joint work on optical lattices jumpstarted the field of quantum simulation. He has also made seminal contributions in the fields of quantum information theory, degenerated quantum gases, quantum optics, and renormalization group methods. As of 2017 Juan Ignacio Cirac has published more than 440 articles in the most prestigious journals and is one of the most cited authors in his fields of research. He has been named among others as a possible candidate to win the Nobel Prize in Physics.

== Other activities ==
=== Corporate boards ===
- Telefónica, member of the board of directors (since 2016)

=== Non-profit organizations ===
- Fundación La Caixa, member of the advisory council (since 2015)
- Annalen der Physik, member of the advisory board (since 2012)
- Fundación BBVA, member of the scientific committee (since 2010)

== Honors and awards ==
In 2003 Cirac was elected a Fellow of the American Physical Society. In 2017 he became a member of the German Academy of Sciences Leopoldina.

He has been granted many awards, notable ones being the 2006 Prince of Asturias Award, the BBVA Foundation Frontiers of Knowledge Award in the Basic Sciences category ex aequo with Peter Zoller, and The Franklin Institute's 2010 Benjamin Franklin Medal in Physics (jointly with David J. Wineland and Peter Zoller). He was awarded the Wolf Prize in Physics with Peter Zoller in 2013. In 2018 he received the Max Planck Medal of the German Physical Society and the Micius Quantum Prize.

In 2023, he received the inaugural La Vanguardia Prize in the category "Innovation". In 2026, he was awarded the Isaac Newton Medal from the Institute of Physics in the United Kingdom.

== See also ==
- Cirac–Zoller controlled-NOT gate
