= Immanuel Bloch =

German physicist

- Born: 16 November 1972 (age 53); Fulda, West Germany
- Known for: ultracold atoms, optical lattices, and Mott insulator
- Awards: Otto Hahn Medal (2002); Gottfried Wilhelm Leibniz Prize (2004); EPS Quantum Electronics Prize (2011); Körber European Science Prize (2013); Harvey Prize (2015); Clarivate Citation Laureate (2022); Stern–Gerlach Medal (2024); Micius Quantum Prize (2025); Wolf Prize (2026)
- Scientific career
- Fields: Physicist
- Workplaces: LMU Munich; Max Planck Institute of Quantum Optics
- Thesis: Atomlaser und Phasenkohärenz atomarer Bose-Einstein-Kondensate (2000)
- Doctoral advisor: Theodor W. Hänsch

Immanuel Bloch (born 16 November 1972, Fulda) is a German experimental physicist. His research is focused on the investigation of quantum many-body systems using ultracold atomic and molecular quantum gases. Bloch is known for his work on atoms in artificial crystals of light, optical lattices, especially the first realization of a quantum phase transition from a weakly interacting superfluid to a strongly interacting Mott insulating state of matter.

== Career ==
Bloch studied physics at the University of Bonn in 1995, followed by a one-year research visit to Stanford University. He obtained his PhD in 2000 working under Theodor W. Hänsch at LMU Munich. The thesis title was Atomlaser und Phasenkohärenz atomarer Bose-Einstein-Kondensate. As a junior group leader, he continued in Munich and started his work on ultracold quantum gases in optical lattices. In 2003, he moved to a full professor position in experimental physics at the University of Mainz, where he stayed until 2009.

In 2008 he was appointed scientific director of the newly founded division on Quantum Many-Body Systems at the Max Planck Institute of Quantum Optics in Garching. Since 2012 he has been vice-dean at the department of physics of LMU Munich and managing director of the Max Planck Institute of Quantum Optics since 2012.

== Research ==
Bloch's work focuses on the investigation of quantum many-body system using ultracold atoms stored in optical lattice potentials. Among other things, he is known for the realization of a quantum phase transition from a superfluid to a Mott insulator, in which ultracold atoms were brought into the regime of strong correlations for the first time, thereby allowing one to mimic the behaviour strongly correlated materials. The experimental ideas were based on a theoretical proposal by Peter Zoller and Ignacio Cirac. His other works includes the observation of a Tonks–Girardeau gas of strongly interacting bosons in one dimensions, the detection of collapses and revivals of the wavefunction of a Bose–Einstein condensate because of interactions, and the use of quantum noise correlations to observe Hanbury Brown and Twiss bunching and antibunching for bosonic and fermionic atoms (simultaneously with the group of Alain Aspect). More recently, his research team was able to realize single-atom resolved imaging and addressing of ultracold atoms held in an optical lattice. Much of his related work was carried out in the group of Markus Greiner.

== Awards ==
In 2005 he was presented with the International Commission of Optics Prize. In 2011, he received the EPS Prize for Fundamental Aspects of Quantum Electronics and Optics of the European Physical Society.

In 2013, Bloch was awarded the Körber European Science Prize and the International Senior BEC Award. For the year 2015 he received the Harvey Prize from Israel's Technion Institute. In 2024 he received the Stern–Gerlach Medal of the German Physical Society. In 2026 he was awarded the Wolf Prize in Physics.

He is a member of the German Academy of Sciences Leopoldina and an external member of the Canadian Institute for Advanced Research.
