= Hidetoshi Katori =

Japanese physicist

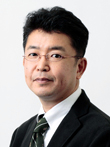
- Katori in 2015
- Born: 香取 秀俊; 27 September 1964 (age 62); Tokyo, Japan
- Education: University of Tokyo
- Known for: Grating; Ultra precise atomic clock Optical lattice
- Awards: I. I. Rabi Award (2008); Asahi Prize (2012); Nishina Memorial Prize (2013); Medal with Purple Ribbon (2014); Japan Academy Prize (2015); Micius Quantum Prize (2020); Breakthrough Prize in Fundamental Physics (2022)
- Scientific career
- Fields: Physics
- Workplaces: University of Tokyo

Hidetoshi Katori (香取秀俊, Katori Hidetoshi; born 27 September 1964) is a Japanese physicist and professor at the University of Tokyo best known for having invented the magic wavelength technique for ultra precise optical lattice atomic clocks. Since 2011, Katori is also Chief Scientist at the Quantum Metrology Lab, RIKEN.

Recently, Katori's group performed a measurement of gravitational redshift with two transportable strontium optical lattice clocks over nearly the entire height of the Tokyo Skytree, setting a new record for the best ground-based test of general relativity.

== Recognition ==
- 2005 – Award of Japan Society for the Promotion of Science
- 2005 – Springer Nature Applied Physics Award
- 2006 – Japan IBM Science Prize
- 2008 – I. I. Rabi Award
- 2010 – Ichimura Academic Award
- 2011 – Award of Minister of MEXT
- 2011 – Philipp Franz von Siebold-Preis, Germany
- 2012 – Asahi Prize
- 2013 – Nishina Memorial Prize
- 2013 – Fujiwara Prize
- 2013 – Toray Award in Science and Technology
- 2014 – Medal with Purple Ribbon
- 2015 – Japan Academy Prize (academics)
- 2017 – Leo Esaki Prize
- 2022 – Breakthrough Prize in Fundamental Physics
- 2022 – Honda Prize
- 2022 – Asian Scientist 100, Asian Scientist

== Selected publications ==
- Ushijima, Ichiro; Takamoto, Masao; Das, Manoj; Ohkubo, Takuya; Katori, Hidetoshi (9 February 2015). "Cryogenic optical lattice clocks". Nature Photonics. 9 (3). Springer Science and Business Media LLC: 185–189. Bibcode:2015NaPho...9..185U. doi:10.1038/nphoton.2015.5. ISSN 1749-4885.
- Yamaguchi, Atsushi; Fujieda, Miho; Kumagai, Motohiro; Hachisu, Hidekazu; Nagano, Shigeo; Li, Ying; Ido, Tetsuya; Takano, Tetsushi; Takamoto, Masao; Katori, Hidetoshi (4 August 2011). "Direct Comparison of Distant Optical Lattice Clocks at the $10^{-16}$ Uncertainty". Applied Physics Express. 4 (8) 082203. IOP Publishing. arXiv:1108.2774. doi:10.1143/apex.4.082203. ISSN 1882-0778. S2CID 118692461.
- Katori, Hidetoshi; Hashiguchi, Koji; Il'inova, E. Yu.; Ovsiannikov, V. D. (9 October 2009). "Magic Wavelength to Make Optical Lattice Clocks Insensitive to Atomic Motion". Physical Review Letters. 103 (15) 153004. American Physical Society (APS). arXiv:0908.2848. Bibcode:2009PhRvL.103o3004K. doi:10.1103/physrevlett.103.153004. ISSN 0031-9007. PMID 19905634.
- Takamoto, Masao; Hong, Feng-Lei; Higashi, Ryoichi; Fujii, Yasuhisa; Imae, Michito; Katori, Hidetoshi (15 October 2006). "Improved Frequency Measurement of a One-Dimensional Optical Lattice Clock with a Spin-Polarized Fermionic87Sr Isotope". Journal of the Physical Society of Japan. 75 (10) 104302. Japan Society of Applied Physics. arXiv:physics/0608212. Bibcode:2006JPSJ...75j4302T. doi:10.1143/jpsj.75.104302. ISSN 0031-9015. S2CID 17685448.
- Takamoto, Masao; Hong, Feng-Lei; Higashi, Ryoichi; Katori, Hidetoshi (2005). "An optical lattice clock". Nature. 435 (7040). Springer Science and Business Media LLC: 321–324. Bibcode:2005Natur.435..321T. doi:10.1038/nature03541. ISSN 0028-0836. PMID 15902252. S2CID 4426565.
- KATORI, HIDETOSHI (2002). "SPECTROSCOPY OF STRONTIUM ATOMS IN THE LAMB-DICKE CONFINEMENT". Frequency Standards and Metrology. WORLD SCIENTIFIC. pp. 323–330. doi:10.1142/9789812777713_0036. ISBN 978-981-02-4911-3.
- Katori, Hidetoshi; Ido, Tetsuya; Kuwata-Gonokami, Makoto (15 August 1999). "Optimal Design of Dipole Potentials for Efficient Loading of Sr Atoms". Journal of the Physical Society of Japan. 68 (8). Physical Society of Japan: 2479–2482. Bibcode:1999JPSJ...68.2479K. doi:10.1143/jpsj.68.2479. ISSN 0031-9015.
- Katori, Hidetoshi; Ido, Tetsuya; Isoya, Yoshitomo; Kuwata-Gonokami, Makoto (8 February 1999). "Magneto-Optical Trapping and Cooling of Strontium Atoms down to the Photon Recoil Temperature". Physical Review Letters. 82 (6). American Physical Society (APS): 1116–1119. Bibcode:1999PhRvL..82.1116K. doi:10.1103/physrevlett.82.1116. ISSN 0031-9007.
