= Gerhard Rempe =

German physicist and professor

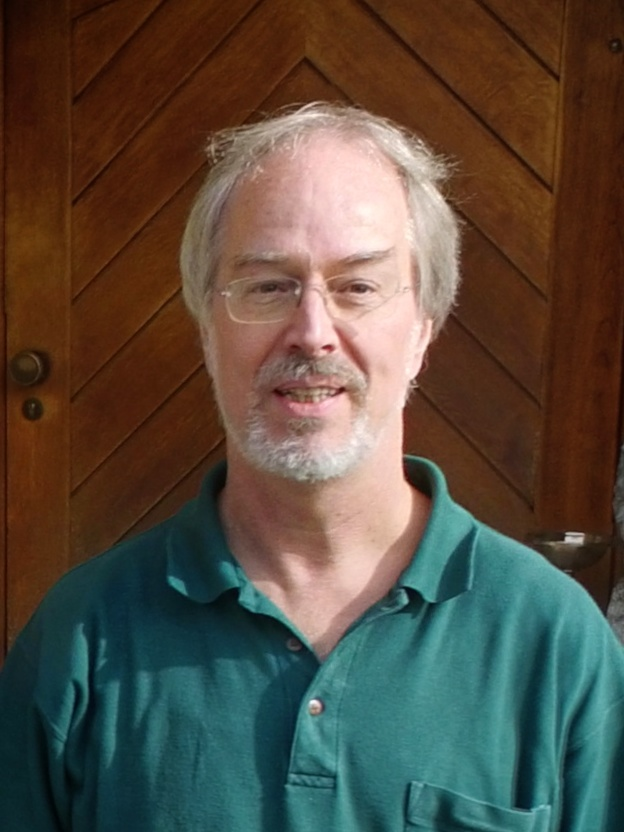
- Rempe in 2016
- Born: 22 April 1956 (age 70); Bottrop, Germany
- Education: LMU Munich
- Scientific career
- Fields: Quantum optics
- Workplaces: Max Planck Institute of Quantum Optics; Technical University of Munich

Gerhard Rempe (born 22 April 1956) is a German physicist, Director at the Max Planck Institute of Quantum Optics and Honorary Professor at the Technical University of Munich. He has performed pioneering experiments in atomic and molecular physics, quantum optics and quantum information processing.

== Career ==
Gerhard Rempe studied mathematics and physics at the University of Duisburg-Essen and LMU Munich between 1976 and 1982. In 1986, he received his PhD degree at LMU. The thesis was entitled "investigation of the interaction of Rydberg atoms with radiation" and reports on experiments performed in the group of Herbert Walther. In the same year he was awarded a first job offer to a permanent position as a lecturer at Vrije Universiteit Amsterdam in the Netherlands. Rempe remained in Munich and completed his habilitation in 1990 with the thesis "Quantum effects in the one-atom maser". From 1990 to 1991, he was Lecturer and from 1990 to 1992 Robert Andrews Millikan Fellow at the California Institute of Technology in Pasadena, California, US, working with H. Jeff Kimble. In 1992, he accepted an appointment as professor of experimental physics at the University of Konstanz. In 1999, he was appointed scientific member of the Max Planck Society, director at the Max Planck Institute of Quantum Optics and honorary professor at the Technical University of Munich. He declined simultaneous offers to ETH Zurich, Switzerland, and the University of Bayreuth, Germany.

== Achievements ==
Rempe is considered a pioneer of the field of cavity quantum electrodynamics. He was first to observe how a single atom repeatedly emits and absorbs a single photon. First experiments he performed with microwave photons in superconducting cavities. Later he expanded his interest to optical photons between mirrors of highest possible reflectivity. His experiments laid the foundation for the development of quantum nonlinear optics, in which a single particle, be it an atom or a photon, causes an effect that many particles cannot induce.

Rempe has used his findings from basic research to develop novel interfaces between light and matter. These interfaces connect the everyday world with the quantum world and have potential applications as senders, receivers and memories of information in a future global quantum network. A remarkable feature of the interface is its ability to detect single photons nondestructively, which opens new perspectives for a scalable quantum computer. The interface is also suitable to observe and control the motion of a single atom in real time, as well as to generate quantum light with noise below the shot noise level.

Rempe has also done pioneering work in the field of atom optics and quantum gases. By means of an atom interferometer he was able to demonstrate experimentally that for an observed object passing through a double-slit arrangement quantum mechanical wave-particle duality is based on entanglement, instead of Heisenberg's uncertainty relation for position and momentum, as often stated in textbooks. He has produced the first Bose-Einstein condensate outside the U.S. and has used it to generate, among others, a strongly correlated gas of molecules by means of the quantum Zeno effect.

In a third research focus Rempe follows the goal to produce an ultracold gas of polyatomic molecules. The focus lies on the development of novel methods for slowing down complex molecules using a centrifuge and for cooling such molecules using the Sisyphus effect. The aim is to understand chemical reactions at low temperatures, to open new reaction channels, to prepare molecules for precision experiments, as well as producing neutral quantum many-body systems with a long-range electrical interaction.

In addition to his research and teaching activities, Rempe was and is engaged in academic self-administration, such as speaker of the Quantum Optics and Photonics section of the German Physical Society, the curator of several magazines such as "Physics in our Time", "Journal of Optics" and "Optics Communications", as chairperson of a selection panel of the European Research Council, as managing director of the Max Planck Institute of Quantum Optics and chairperson of the prize committee of the Stern-Gerlach medal of the German Physical Society.
