= Vernier spectroscopy =

Vernier spectroscopy is a type of cavity enhanced laser absorption spectroscopy that is especially sensitive to trace gases. The method uses a frequency comb laser combined with a high finesse optical cavity to produce an absorption spectrum in a highly parallel manner. The method is also capable of detecting trace gases in very low concentration due to the enhancement effect of the optical resonator on the effective optical path length.

== Overview of method ==
Understanding of the principle of operation of Vernier spectroscopy requires an understanding of frequency comb lasers. The oscillating electric field of a laser (or any time dependent signal) can be represented by a sum of sinusoidal signals in the frequency domain using the Fourier series. The oscillating electric field of a coherent, continuous-wave (cw) laser is represented as a single narrow peak in the frequency domain representation. If the laser is amplitude-modulated to produce a stable train of very short pulses (usually through mode-locking), the equivalent frequency domain representation is a series of narrow frequency peaks centered around the laser's original cw frequency. These frequency peaks are separated by the frequency of the time domain pulses. This is called the repetition rate of the frequency comb.

Since the sensitivity of absorption spectroscopy depends on the path length of the light in the test sample, cavity enhanced spectroscopy attains high sensitivity by creating multiple passes through the sample, effectively multiplying the path length. Vernier spectroscopy uses a high finesse cavity to produce a large enhancement. A high finesse optical cavity will also produce a sharp resonance condition, where only light that is coupled into it with frequencies coinciding with a harmonic of the free spectral range of the cavity will produce constructive interference and an appreciable output of the cavity.

There will only be appreciable output from the optical resonator when a frequency peak from the frequency-comb laser coincides with a harmonic of the free spectral range of the cavity. In Vernier spectroscopy, the ratio of the repetition rate of the frequency comb to the free spectral range of the cavity is N/(N-1), where N is an integer, so that only every N peak of the frequency comb will satisfy the resonance condition of the optical cavity and propagate through it and the sample. This is chosen so that the two sets of resonances form a Vernier scale, giving the name to the technique. This is essential because a typical frequency comb repetition rate is on the order of radio frequencies, making the task of resolving and detecting individual frequency components difficult. If N is made to be large, then the frequency separation of the resonator output peaks will be large enough to be resolved by a simple grating spectrometer. If the length of the cavity is changed slightly, usually by a piezoelectric actuator, then the free spectral range of the cavity will also change. This changing FSR develops a new set of resonances with the frequency comb as the scan proceeds, effectively scanning through the sets of 'filtered out' peaks of the frequency comb.

The individual frequency components of the transmitted light are spatially separated using a simple spectrometer, usually a diffraction grating. In order to achieve a highly parallel measurement of the individual frequency components transmitted through the sample and out of the cavity, a CCD camera capable of operating in the spectral range of the laser light is used. In the case of the diffraction grating, the frequency components are separated in one spatial direction and focused into the CCD camera. In order to take advantage of the other spatial direction of the CCD, the light is scanned across the perpendicular direction of the CCD at the same time that the cavity length is scanned using an actuator. This produces a grid of peaks on the CCD image corresponding to a mode matching condition between the frequency comb and optical cavity.

== Example apparatus ==
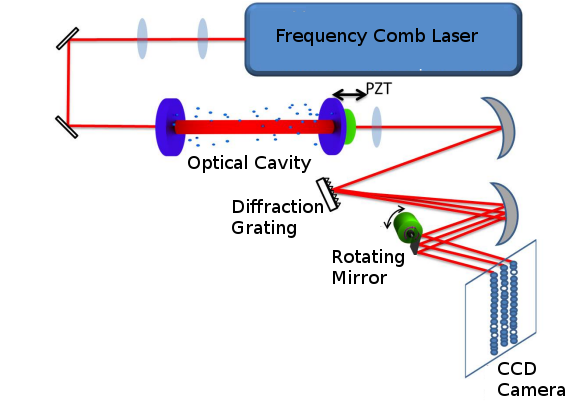
A possible setup of a Vernier spectrometer. Three actions are synchronized: the optical cavity length scan, the rotation of the mirror through the field of view of the CCD, and the CCD exposure time. PZT is a piezoelectric actuator which can give slight adjustments to the cavity length. The mirror is rotated using a stepper motor. The optical cavity is composed of two highly reflective mirrors (although allowing partial transmission) to yield a large enhancement effect on the optical path length.

A simple realization of the Vernier spectroscopy setup has five basic components: a frequency comb, a scannable high finesse optical cavity, a diffraction grating, rotating mirror, and a CCD camera. The trace gas to be measured is put between the mirrors of the optical cavity to allow for optical path enhancement. The frequency comb is coupled into the resonator and made to form a Vernier ratio with the response function. The output of the cavity is reflected off a diffraction grating, providing angular separation of the frequency components of the beam. The diffracted beam is then reflected off the rotatable mirror and then focused onto the CCD camera. Three things must then happen in synchronization. The optical cavity scans through a free spectral range of the cavity while the rotating mirror simultaneously scans the direction perpendicular to the diffraction grating's diffraction plane. These two actions can be synchronized by means of a periodic ramp voltage which controls both the cavity scan (accomplished by a piezoelectric actuator) and mirror rotation (controlled by a stepper motor). If the CCD camera's exposure time is also set equal to the ramp voltage period, the resulting CCD image is a two dimensional matrix of approximately Gaussian peaks. In this manner, an entire spectrum is produced in the period of the ramp voltage. The time it takes to obtain a spectrum is limited by the cavity scan time, rotating mirror response, and minimum camera exposure time. This particular Vernier spectroscopy scheme is capable of producing an absorption spectrum of a trace gas (<1 ppmV) with tens of thousands of data points in less than a second.

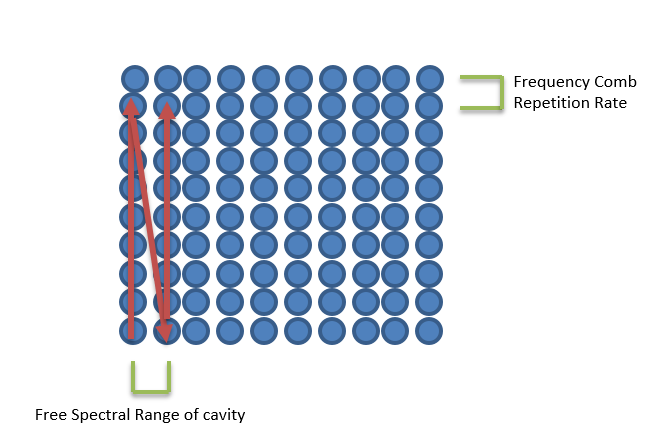
Image collected by the CCD camera. The red arrow shows increasing frequency in steps of the frequency comb repetition rate. Each spot location corresponds to a particular frequency, while the spot intensity corresponds to the transmission of that frequency through the test sample. Further information about the phase shift of the light through the sample can be obtained from the spot shape. This image would correspond to a Vernier ratio of 10/9

Vernier spectroscopy produces a kind of 2-dimensional spectral pattern on the CCD image, a matrix of approximately Gaussian peaks. The integrated intensity of each Gaussian peak gives the transmitted intensity through the test gas, while the position of the peak also gives information about the relative frequency of the peak. Additional information about the phase shift of the light transmitted by the test gas can be extracted from the shape of the individual peaks present on the image. Although all of the spectral information is contained in the images produced by the CCD, some amount of image processing is required to convert the CCD image into a traditional one-dimensional spectrum
