= Entanglement swapping =

Quantum mechanics idea

In quantum mechanics, entanglement swapping is a protocol to transfer quantum entanglement from one pair of particles to another, even if the second pair of particles have never interacted. This process may have application in quantum communication networks and quantum computing.

== Concept ==
Entanglement states from independent sources can become entangled through Bell state analysis.

=== Basic principles ===
Entanglement swapping has two pairs of entangled particles: (A, B) and (C, D). Pair of particles (A, B) is initially entangled, as is the pair (C, D). The pair (B, C) taken from the original pairs, is projected onto one of the four possible Bell states, a process called a Bell state measurement. The unmeasured pair of particles (A, D) can become entangled. This effect happens without any previous direct interaction between particles A and D.

Entanglement swapping is a form of quantum teleportation. In quantum teleportation, the unknown state of a particle can be sent from one location to another using the combination of a quantum and classical channel. The unknown state is projected by Alice onto a Bell state and the result is communicated to Bob through the classical channel. In entanglement swapping, the state from one of the two sources is the quantum channel of teleportation and the state from the other source is the unknown being sent to Bob.

=== Mathematical representation ===
The mathematical expression for the swapping process is:

$$\left| \psi \right\rangle_{AB} \otimes \left| \psi \right\rangle_{CD} \xrightarrow{\text{BSM}_{BC}} \left| \psi \right\rangle_{AD}$$

In this expression, $\left| \psi \right\rangle_{XY}$ refers to an entangled state of pair of particles (X,Y) while BSM indicates Bell state measurement. A Bell state is one of four specific states of representing two particles with maximal entanglement; a Bell state measurement projects a quantum state onto this basis set.

== Potential applications ==
=== Quantum cryptography ===
In the field of quantum cryptography, it helps secure communication channels better. By utilizing swapped entanglements between particles' pairs, it is possible to generate secure encryption keys that should be protected against eavesdropping.

=== Quantum networks ===
Entanglement swapping also serves as a core technology for designing quantum networks, where many nodes-like quantum computers or communication points-link through these special connections made by entangled links. These networks may support safely transferring quantum information over long routes.

=== Quantum repeaters and long-distance communication ===
Entanglement swapping may allow the construction of quantum repeaters to stretch out quantum communication networks by allowing entanglement to be shared over long distances. Performing entanglement swapping at certain points acts like relaying information without loss.

== History ==
Bernard Yurke and David Stoler showed theoretically in 1992 that entanglement does not require interaction of the final measured particles. Using a three component Greenberger–Horne–Zeilinger state, they showed that Mermin's device, a thought experiment model designed to explain entanglement, was equivalent to an EPR experiment where the correlated particles had never directly interacted.

The term entanglement swapping was coined by physicists Marek Żukowski, Anton Zeilinger, Michael A. Horne, and Artur K. Ekert in their 1993 paper. They refined the concept to show one can extend entanglement from one particle pair to another using a method called Bell state measurement.

In 1998 Jian-Wei Pan working in Zeilinger's group conducted the first experiment on entanglement swapping. They used entangled photons to show successful transfer of entanglement between pairs that never interacted. Later experiments took this further, making it work over longer distances and with more complex quantum states.
