= John Rarity =

British physicist

John Rarity FRS
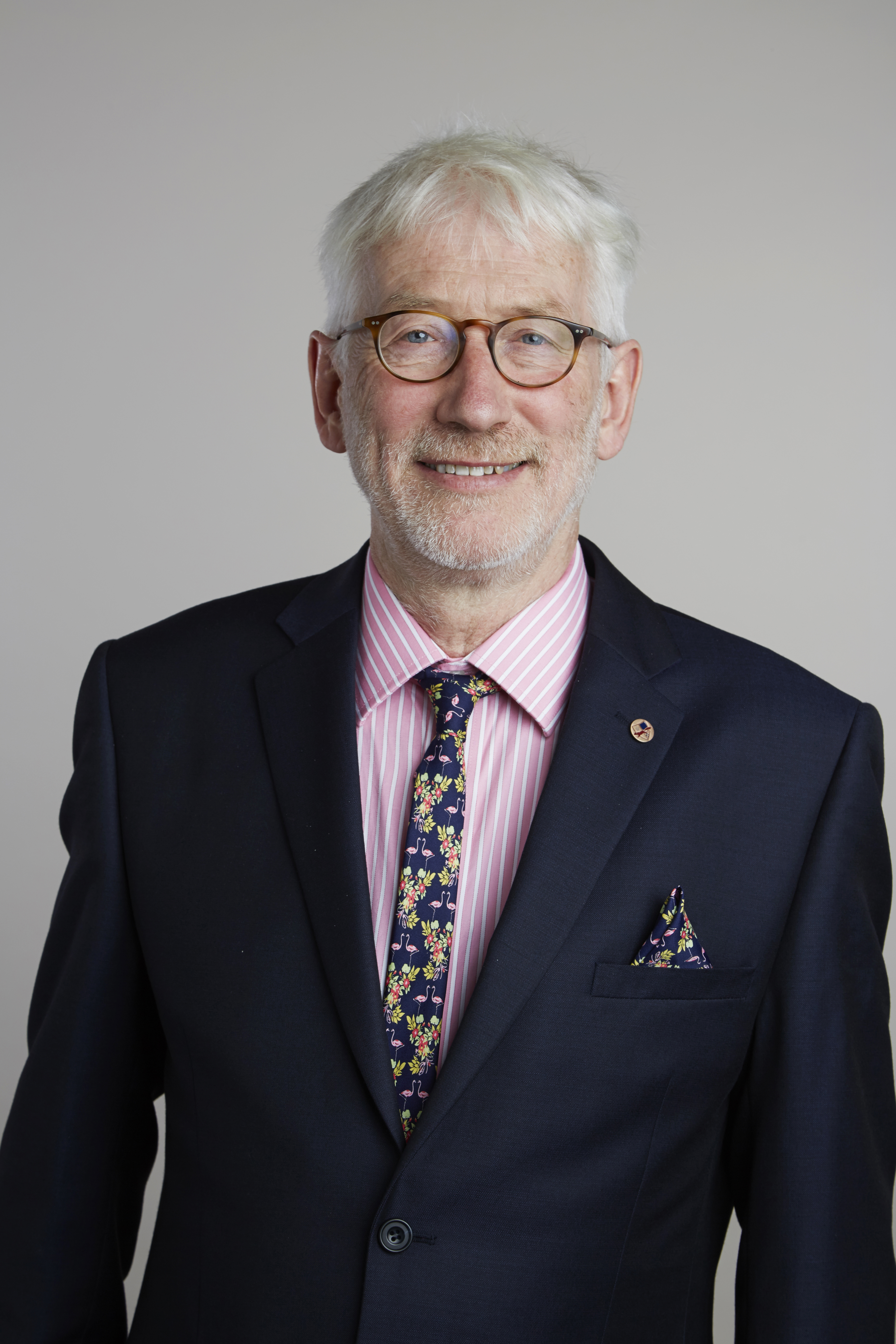
- Rarity in 2015
- Born: John G. Rarity
- Education: University of Sheffield; Royal Military College of Science
- Scientific career
- Fields: Physics
- Workplaces: University of Bristol
- Thesis: Number fluctuation spectroscopy applied to coagulating dispersions (1984)
- Website: www.bris.ac.uk/engineering/people/john-g-rarity

John G. Rarity is a British physicist who is professor of optical communication systems in the department of electrical and electronic engineering at the University of Bristol, a post he has held since 1 January 2003. He is an international expert on quantum optics, quantum cryptography and quantum communication using single photons and entanglement. Rarity is a member of the Quantum Computation and Information group and quantum photonics at the University of Bristol.

== Education ==
Rarity was educated at the University of Sheffield (BSc) and awarded a PhD from the Royal Military College of Science in 1984 for research on spectroscopy applied to coagulating dispersions.

== Research and career ==
Prior to moving to the University of Bristol in 2001, Rarity worked as a physicist at the Defence Evaluation and Research Agency (DERA) arm of the Ministry of Defence (United Kingdom).

Notable early achievements while at DERA included demonstrations of quantum interference and non-locality over large distances, demonstrating a violation of Bell's Inequality over 4 km of optical fibre in 1994. These experiments were followed by work in quantum cryptography, resulting in his team at DERA setting a world record of 1.9 km range for free space secure quantum cryptography. A collaboration with LMU Munich in 2002 successfully demonstrated an open air quantum cryptography experiment over a distance of 23.4 km.

Since moving to the University of Bristol, Rarity has built up a group working in experimental quantum optics. One project which has received substantial publicity recently in collaboration with the Quantum Information Processing group at HP Labs is developing affordable quantum key distribution systems. The scheme reduces the cost by using pulsed LEDs rather than lasers as the source of transmitted qubits.

In 2007 Rarity collaborated in a demonstration of quantum key distribution using free space optical communications over 144 km between the islands of Tenerife and La Palma.

=== Publications ===
His books include Microcavities and Photonic Bandgaps: Physics and Applications and highly cited papers include Practical quantum cryptography based on two-photon interferometry and Experimental violation of Bell's inequality based on phase and momentum.

=== Awards and honours ===
Rarity won the Thomas Young Medal and Prize in 1995.

Rarity was elected a Fellow of the Royal Society (FRS) in 2015.

Rarity won the Micius Quantum Prize in 2023.
