= Markus Greiner =

German physicist

- Born: August 20, 1973 (age 53); Hannover, Germany
- Education: LMU Munich; Max Planck Institute of Quantum Optics
- Known for: optical lattices, Mott insulator
- Awards: Otto-Klung-Weberbank-Preis (2005); William L. McMillan Award (2005); MacArthur Fellow (2011); I.I. Rabi Prize in Atomic, Molecular or Optical Physics (2013); Micius Quantum Prize (2025)
- Scientific career
- Fields: Physics; Atomic Physics; Ultracold Atoms
- Workplaces: Harvard University
- Doctoral advisor: Theodor Hänsch
- Other academic advisors: Deborah S. Jin (postdoc)

Markus Greiner is a German physicist and Professor of Physics at Harvard University.

Greiner studied under the Nobel Laureate Theodor Hänsch at LMU Munich and at the Max-Planck-Institute of Quantum Optics, where he received his diploma and PhD in physics for experimental work on Bose-Einstein condensates and bosons in optical lattices. He was involved in the first realization of the quantum phase transition from a superfluid to Mott insulator in a Bose-Hubbard system.

He then moved to the United States and conducted postdoctoral research at JILA under Deborah Jin, working on the creation of a fermionic condensate of ultracold atoms. Since 2005 Greiner has been a professor at Harvard University, continuing research on BECs and ultracold Fermi gases.

He was recipient of the Outstanding Doctoral Thesis Research in AMO award of the American Physical Society in 2004 and the William L. McMillan award in 2005 for outstanding contributions in condensed matter physics. In 2011, he was named a MacArthur Fellow. He was awarded the I. I. Rabi Prize in Atomic, Molecular, and Optical Physics by the APS in 2013. In 2017 he was elected a fellow of the American Physical Society.
