= Max Planck Institute of Quantum Optics =

German research institute

Coordinates: 48°15′34″N 11°40′0″E

Max-Planck-Institute for Quantum Optics
- Max-Planck-Institut für Quantenoptik
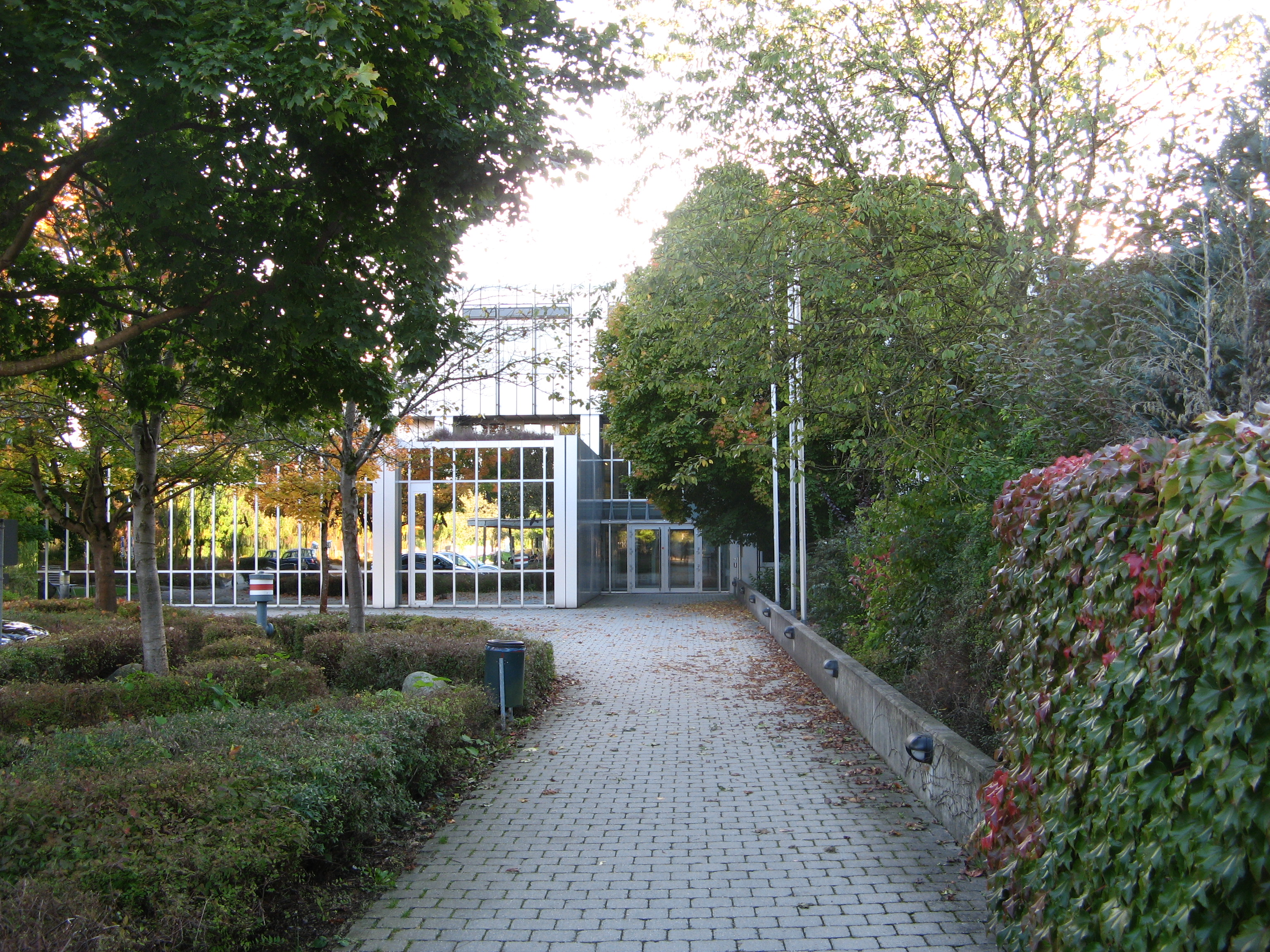
- Abbreviation: MPQ
- Formation: 1981
- Headquarters: Munich
- Location: Garching bei München, Germany
- Members: 400
- Current managing director: Ferenc Krausz
- Parent organization: MPG
- Affiliations: LMU, TUM
- Staff: 400
- Website: http://www.mpq.mpg.de/en

The Max-Planck-Institute of Quantum Optics (abbreviation: MPQ; German: Max-Planck-Institut für Quantenoptik) is a part of the Max Planck Society which operates 87 research facilities in Germany.

The institute is located in Garching, Germany, which in turn is located 10 km north-east of Munich. Five research groups work in the fields of attosecond physics, laser physics, quantum information theory, laser spectroscopy, quantum dynamics and quantum many body systems.

== Structure ==
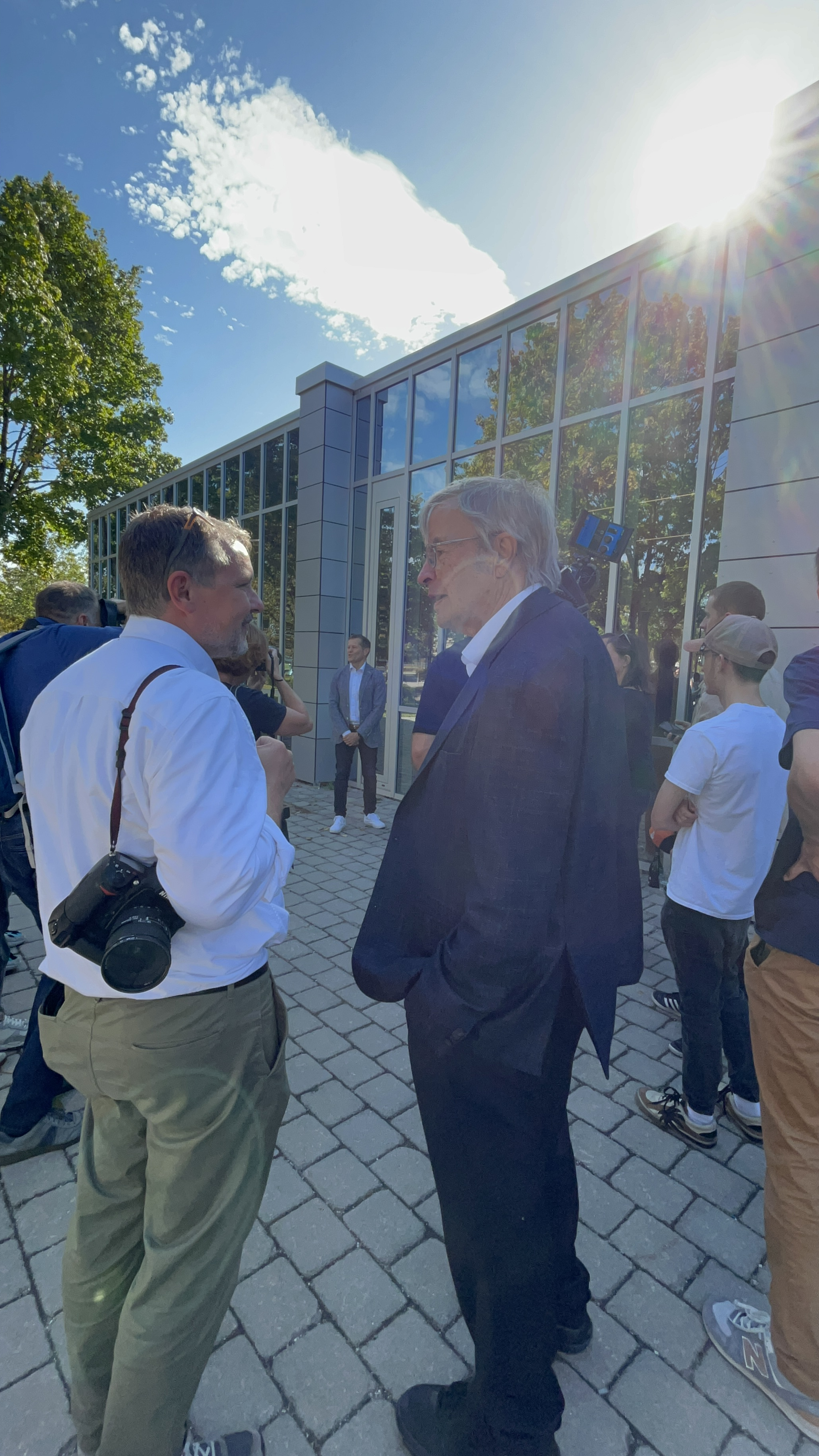
2005 Nobel prize winner Theodor W. Hänsch and 2023 Nobel Prize winner Krausz in a single frame (picture dated 03rd October, 2023) in the MPQ premises

=== Divisions ===
- Attosecond physics (Ferenc Krausz)
- Laser spectroscopy (Theodor W. Hänsch)
- Quantum dynamics (Gerhard Rempe)
- Quantum many body systems (Immanuel Bloch)
- Theory (Juan Ignacio Cirac Sasturain)

=== Research groups ===
- RyD-QMB, Rydberg Dressed Quantum Many-Body Systems (Christian Groß)
- Antimatter spectroscopy (Masaki Hori)
- Otto Hahn Group Quantum Networks (Andreas Reiserer)
- Theory of Quantum Matter (Richard Schmidt)
- Entanglement of Complex Quantum Systems (Norbert Schuch)

== Research ==
The institute investigates the interaction of light and matter. Its faculty members conduct research in topics such as theoretical quantum optics, quantum information theory, ultra-high-resolution laser spectroscopy, quantum physics of ultra-cold atoms, development of components for quantum computers and quantum networks, Bose Einstein condensation of degenerate quantum gases, attosecond physics, development of new radiation and particle sources for fundamental and medical applications, etc. There used to be a group at MPQ that conducted experiments on gravitational waves.

== History ==
The Max-Planck-Institute for Quantum Optics was founded on January 1, 1981. It was a successor of a project group for laser research of the Max Planck Institute for Plasma Physics. The use of lasers for fusion research, quantum optics and spectroscopy were the goals of the project group, which was established in 1976 and consisted of 46 members. In 1981 the staff numbers had risen to 82 and the institute was comprising the divisions of Laser Physics (Prof. Herbert Walther), Laser Chemistry (Prof. Karl-Ludwig Kompa) and Laser Plasma (Dr. Siegbert Witkowski).

The institute was initially accommodated on the premises of the Max Planck Institute for Plasma Physics, but eventually moved to its new building in July 1986, officially separating from the Max Planck Institute for Plasma Physics. With the appointment of Theodor Hänsch (then at Stanford University) as new director, the institute grew significantly. Hänsch established the Laser Spectroscopy Division and was also given a chair at LMU Munich, which ensured close links between MPQ and the university complex in Munich. After the retirement of Siegbert Witkowski in 1993, the research on the high energy laser was stopped and other research areas were started.

In 1999 Professor Gerhard Rempe (then University of Constance) was appointed as director at the MPQ, and the Quantum Dynamics Division was set up.

In 2001 the Research Group on Gravitational Waves, led by Dr. Karsten Danzmann, moved to Hanover where the first test measurements were carried out in the experiment. Since then that group has been a part of the MPI for Gravitational Physics (Potsdam) that was founded in 1995. In the same year (2001) Professor Ignacio Cirac (then University of Innsbruck) accepted a call as director at the MPQ and set up the first Theory Division at the institute.

At the beginning of 2003 Professor Herbert Walther acquired emeritus status, but continued his research work as head of the Laser Physics Emeritus Group until his death in July 2006. His successor as director at the MPQ and professor at the LMU is Professor Ferenc Krausz (previously Technical University of Vienna). Professor Krausz has led the Attosecond Physics Division since 2003.

Professor Karl-Ludwig Kompa was the last founding father of the institute to retire in 2006. In parallel with these retirements three new research divisions and several independent research groups were established: In 2004 the Attosecond Driver Laser Group was formed, whose leader Dr. Andrius Baltuska took up a professorship at the Technical University of Vienna in 2006. The same year also the Quantum Simulations with Trapped Ions Group was founded, led by Dr. Tobias Schätz (now at the University of Freiburg). In 2005 Dr. Tobias Kippenberg (now at the Ecole Polytechnique Fédérale de Lausanne) set up his Laboratory of Photonics at the MPQ. In 2006 Dr. Reinhard Kienberger (now at the Technical University of Munich) received funding to set up the research group Attosecond Dynamics. In 2007 a further research group was founded, on Attosecond Imaging, led by Dr. Matthias Kling. In January 2008 Dr. Masaki Hori established his group on Antimatter Spectroscopy, followed by the Ultrafast Quantum Optics group of Dr. Peter Hommelhoff (now at the University of Erlangen-Nuremberg) in April 2008. In December 2010 Dr. Elefterios Goulielmakis (now at the University of Rostock) started his research group on Attoelectronics. Dr. Randolf Pohl (now at the University of Mainz) started to establish his research group "Muonic Atoms" at the end of 2011. Currently (in February 2020), there exist five independent research groups at MPQ. In addition to Masaki Hori's antimatter spectroscopy group, there is the Rydberg Dressed Quantum Many-Body Systems Group (Dr. Christian Groß), the Otto Hahn Group on Quantum Networks (Dr. Andreas Reiserer), the Theory of Quantum Matter Group (Dr. Richard Schmidt), and the Entanglement of Complex Quantum Systems Group (Prof. Dr. Norbert Schuch).

In 2005, Theodor W. Hänsch was awarded the Nobel Prize in Physics, together with John L. Hall, "for their contributions to the development of laser-based precision spectroscopy, including the optical frequency comb technique". The frequency comb the Nobel Prize is referring to has been developed in his Laser Spectroscopy Division in the late 1990s.

On 1 August 2008 a fifth division Quantum Many Body Systems was established by Prof. Immanuel Bloch. Prof. Bloch is successor of Prof. Theodor W. Hänsch, who normally would have retired as director at MPQ in 2009. Due to special agreements Prof. Hänsch will remain professor at the LMU and director at the MPQ at least until 2016. One research focus of Prof. Bloch is the investigation of ultracold quantum gases in optical lattices. These systems may help to model solid states and to get a better understanding of special properties such as e.g. high temperature superconductivity.

In 2023, Ferenc Krausz, Director at the Max Planck Institute of Quantum Optics and Professor at LMU Munich, together with Pierre Agostini and Anne L'Huillier were honoured with the Nobel Prize in Physics. The Nobel Committee is honouring the three researchers for the foundation of attosecond physics.

== Degree programme ==
- MPQ offers two special Ph.D. programmes, namely the "International Max-Planck Research School (IMPRS) on Advanced Photon Science" and the "International PhD Programme of Excellence on Quantum Computing, Control and Communication" together with LMU Munich, the Technical University of Munich and the Vienna University of Technology.
