= International Conference of Laser Applications =

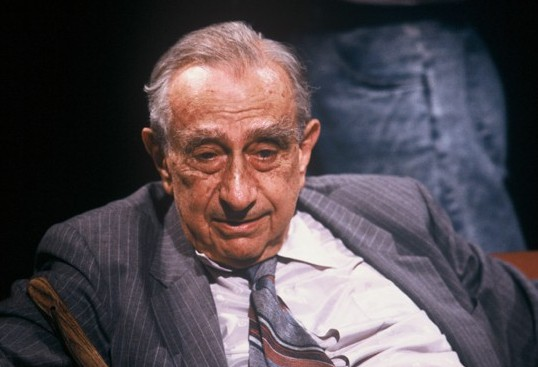
Edward Teller participated in the panel discussions of Lasers '85, Lasers '87, and Lasers '92.

The International Conference on Lasers and Applications, Lasers 'XX was an annual conference organized by the former Society for Optical and Quantum Electronics. The conference, known in short by Lasers 'XX (where XX refers to the particular year), was held at various locations in The United States from 1978 to 2000.

The emphasis of these conferences was laser development and in particular the development of high-power lasers. The papers delivered at these conferences were published in a series of hard-bound volumes known as Proceedings of the International Conference on Lasers 'XX (ISSN 0190-4132) by STS Press. In total, more than 20 book proceedings were published.

A particular feature of these conferences was the organization of high-power panel discussions on timely topics of interest, such as the role of lasers in directed energy and the Strategic Defense Initiative (SDI), during the presidency of Ronald Reagan. Noted physicists, including Edward Teller and Arthur Kantrowitz, participated in these discussions. Towards the end of the Cold War this conference enjoyed the participation of numerous Soviet laser physicists, including prominent authors such as Alexander Prokhorov and Nikolay Basov.

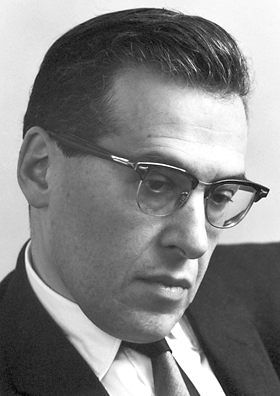
Julian Schwinger was plenary speaker at Lasers '88.

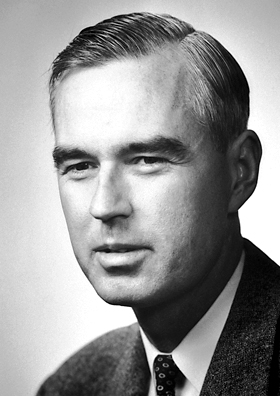
Willis Lamb was plenary speaker at Lasers '92.

A partial list of plenary and invited speakers include (in chronological order):

- Amnon Yariv,
- John Madey,
- Charles K. Rhodes,
- Kumar Patel,
- Robert Alfano,
- Marlan Scully,
- Colin Webb,
- Charles A. Brau,
- David C. Hanna,
- Serge Haroche,
- Julian Schwinger,
- William T. Silfvast,
- S. E. Harris,
- L. M. Narducci,
- Willis Lamb,
- Norman F. Ramsey,
- F. J. Duarte,
- Theodor W. Hänsch,
- Carl E. Wieman,
- David J. Wineland,
- Anthony E. Siegman,

Besides the emphasis on high-power lasers and panel discussions on this subject, many scientific disclosures made at these conferences went on to contribute to, or to inspire, further research in a variety of fields including:

- X-ray laser sources
- Tunable solid state lasers
- Tm:YAG lasers
- Rare gas halide lasers
- Solid-state organic lasers
- Laser dye photostability
- Laser crystals
- Lasing without population inversion
- Electromagnetically induced transparency
- Optics communications
- Digital imaging
- Holography
- Faraday filters
- Fiber fuses

From Lasers '88 to Lasers '96, the prestigious Einstein Prize for Laser Science was awarded.

== External links: conference photographs ==
- Edward Teller gives press conference at Lasers'87
- Group photograph at Lasers'92 including, right to left, Marlan Scully, Willis Lamb, John L. Hall, and F. J. Duarte.
- Group photograph at Lasers'93 including (right to left) Norman F. Ramsey, Marlan Scully, and F. J. Duarte.
- Group photograph at Lasers'95 including (right to left) Marlan Scully, Theodor W. Hänsch, Carl E. Wieman, and F. J. Duarte.
