= Mainau Declaration =

Three appeals against nuclear weapons

The Mainau Declaration refers to any one of three socio-political appeals by Nobel laureates who participated in the Lindau Nobel Laureate Meetings, the annual gathering with young scientists at the German town of Lindau. The name denotes that these declarations were presented on Mainau Island in Lake Constance, the traditional venue of the last day of the one-week meeting.

== Mainau Declaration 1955 ==
The first Mainau Declaration was an appeal against the use of nuclear weapons. Initiated and drafted by German nuclear scientists Otto Hahn and Max Born, it was circulated at the 5th Lindau Nobel Laureate Meeting (11–15 July 1955) and presented on Mainau Island on 15 July 1955. The declaration was initially signed by 18 Nobel laureates. Within a year, the number of supporters rose to 52 Nobel laureates.

=== Full text ===
We, the undersigned, are scientists of different countries, different creeds, different political persuasions. Outwardly, we are bound together only by the Nobel Prize, which we have been favored to receive. With pleasure we have devoted our lives to the service of science. It is, we believe, a path to a happier life for people. We see with horror that this very science is giving mankind the means to destroy itself. By total military use of weapons feasible today, the earth can be contaminated with radioactivity to such an extent that whole peoples can be annihilated. Neutrals may die thus as well as belligerents.

If war broke out among the great powers, who could guarantee that it would not develop into a deadly conflict? A nation that engages in a total war thus signals its own destruction and imperils the whole world.

We do not deny that perhaps peace is being preserved precisely by the fear of these weapons. Nevertheless, we think it is a delusion if governments believe that they can avoid war for a long time through the fear of these weapons. Fear and tension have often engendered wars. Similarly it seems to us a delusion to believe that small conflicts could in the future always be decided by traditional weapons. In extreme danger no nation will deny itself the use of any weapon that scientific technology can produce.

All nations must come to the decision to renounce force as a final resort. If they are not prepared to do this, they will cease to exist.

— Mainau, Lake Constance, 15 July 1955

=== Signatories ===
The initial 18 signatories were:

- Kurt Alder
- Max Born
- Adolf Butenandt
- Arthur H. Compton
- Gerhard Domagk
- Hans von Euler-Chelpin
- Otto Hahn
- Werner Heisenberg
- George Hevesy
- Richard Kuhn
- Fritz Lipmann
- Hermann Joseph Muller
- Paul Hermann Müller
- Leopold Ruzicka
- Frederick Soddy
- Wendell M. Stanley
- Hermann Staudinger
- Hideki Yukawa

== Mainau Declaration 2015 on Climate Change ==
The Mainau Declaration 2015 on Climate Change was presented on Mainau Island, Germany, on the occasion of the last day of the 65th Lindau Nobel Laureate Meeting on Friday 3 July 2015. It is an urgent warning of the consequences of climate change and was initially signed by 36 Nobel laureates. In the months thereafter, 35 additional laureates joined the group of supporters of the declaration. As of February 2016, a total of 76 Nobel laureates endorse the Mainau Declaration 2015.

The text of the declaration states that although more data needs to be analysed and further research has to be done, the climate report by the IPCC still represents the most reliable scientific assessment on anthropogenic climate change, and that it should therefore be used as a foundation upon which policymakers should discuss actions to oppose the global threat of climate change.

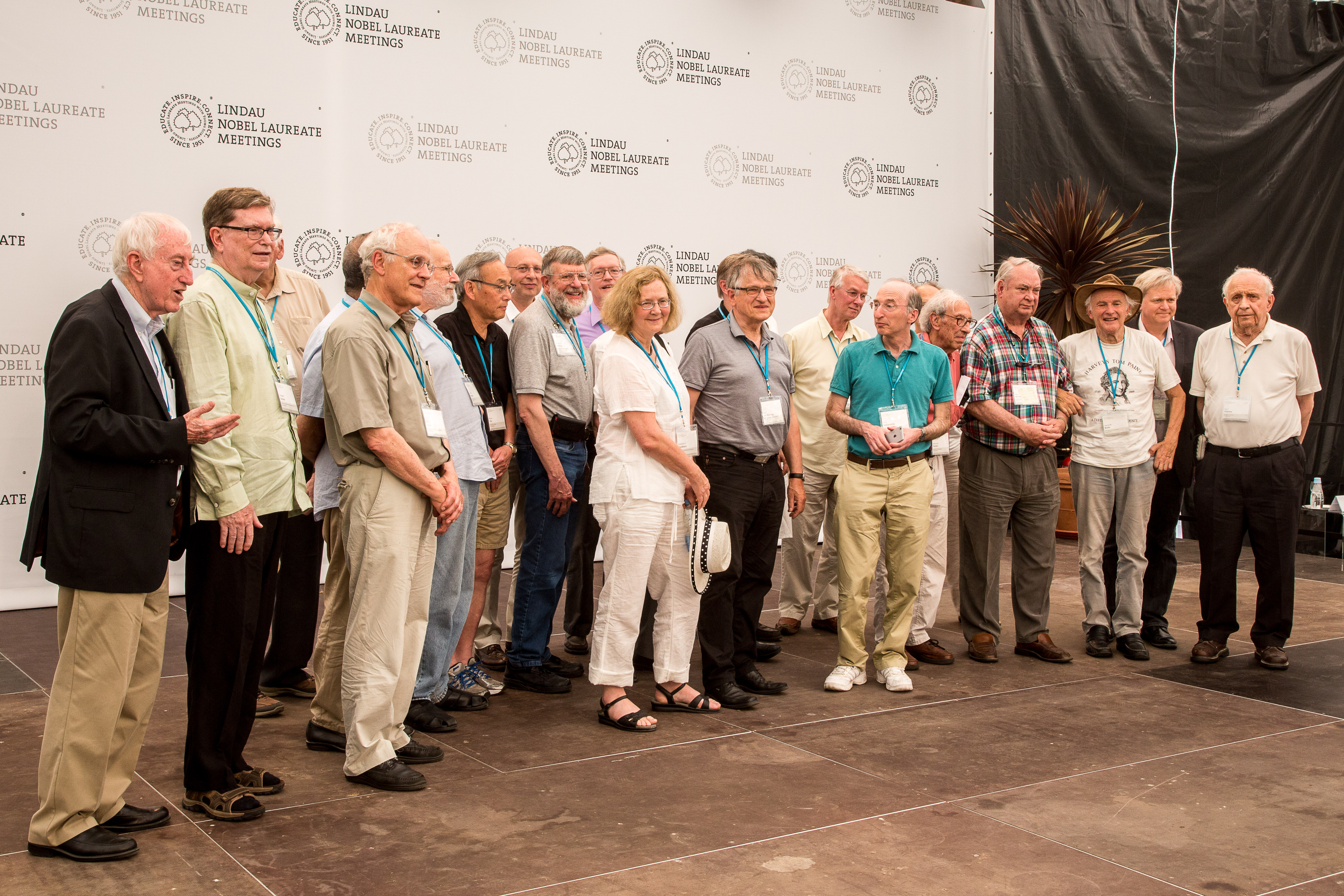
A group photo of some of the Nobel laureates who initially signed the Mainau Declaration 2015. Photo: Christian Flemming

=== Full text ===
We undersigned scientists, who have been awarded Nobel Prizes, have come to the shores of Lake Constance in southern Germany, to share insights with promising young researchers, who like us come from around the world. Nearly 60 years ago, here on Mainau, a similar gathering of Nobel Laureates in science issued a declaration of the dangers inherent in the newly found technology of nuclear weapons—a technology derived from advances in basic science. So far we have avoided nuclear war though the threat remains. We believe that our world today faces another threat of comparable magnitude.

Successive generations of scientists have helped create a more and more prosperous world. This prosperity has come at the cost of a rapid rise in the consumption of the world’s resources. If left unchecked, our ever-increasing demand for food, water, and energy will eventually overwhelm the Earth’s ability to satisfy humanity’s needs, and will lead to wholesale human tragedy. Already, scientists who study Earth’s climate are observing the impact of human activity.

In response to the possibility of human-induced climate change, the United Nations established the Intergovernmental Panel on Climate Change (IPCC) to provide the world’s leaders a summary of the current state of relevant scientific knowledge. While by no means perfect, we believe that the efforts that have led to the current IPCC Fifth Assessment Report represent the best source of information regarding the present state of knowledge on climate change. We say this not as experts in the field of climate change, but rather as a diverse group of scientists who have a deep respect for and understanding of the integrity of the scientific process.

Although there remains uncertainty as to the precise extent of climate change, the conclusions of the scientific community contained in the latest IPCC report are alarming, especially in the context of the identified risks of maintaining human prosperity in the face of greater than a 2 °C rise in average global temperature. The report concludes that anthropogenic emissions of greenhouse gases are the likely cause of the current global warming of the Earth. Predictions from the range of climate models indicate that this warming will very likely increase the Earth’s temperature over the coming century by more than 2 °C above its pre-industrial level unless dramatic reductions are made in anthropogenic emissions of greenhouse gases over the coming decades.

Based on the IPCC assessment, the world must make rapid progress towards lowering current and future greenhouse gas emissions to minimize the substantial risks of climate change. We believe that the nations of the world must take the opportunity at the United Nations Climate Change Conference in Paris in December 2015 to take decisive action to limit future global emissions. This endeavor will require the cooperation of all nations, whether developed or developing, and must be sustained into the future in accord with updated scientific assessments. Failure to act will subject future generations of humanity to unconscionable and unacceptable risk.

— Mainau, Germany, 3 July 2015

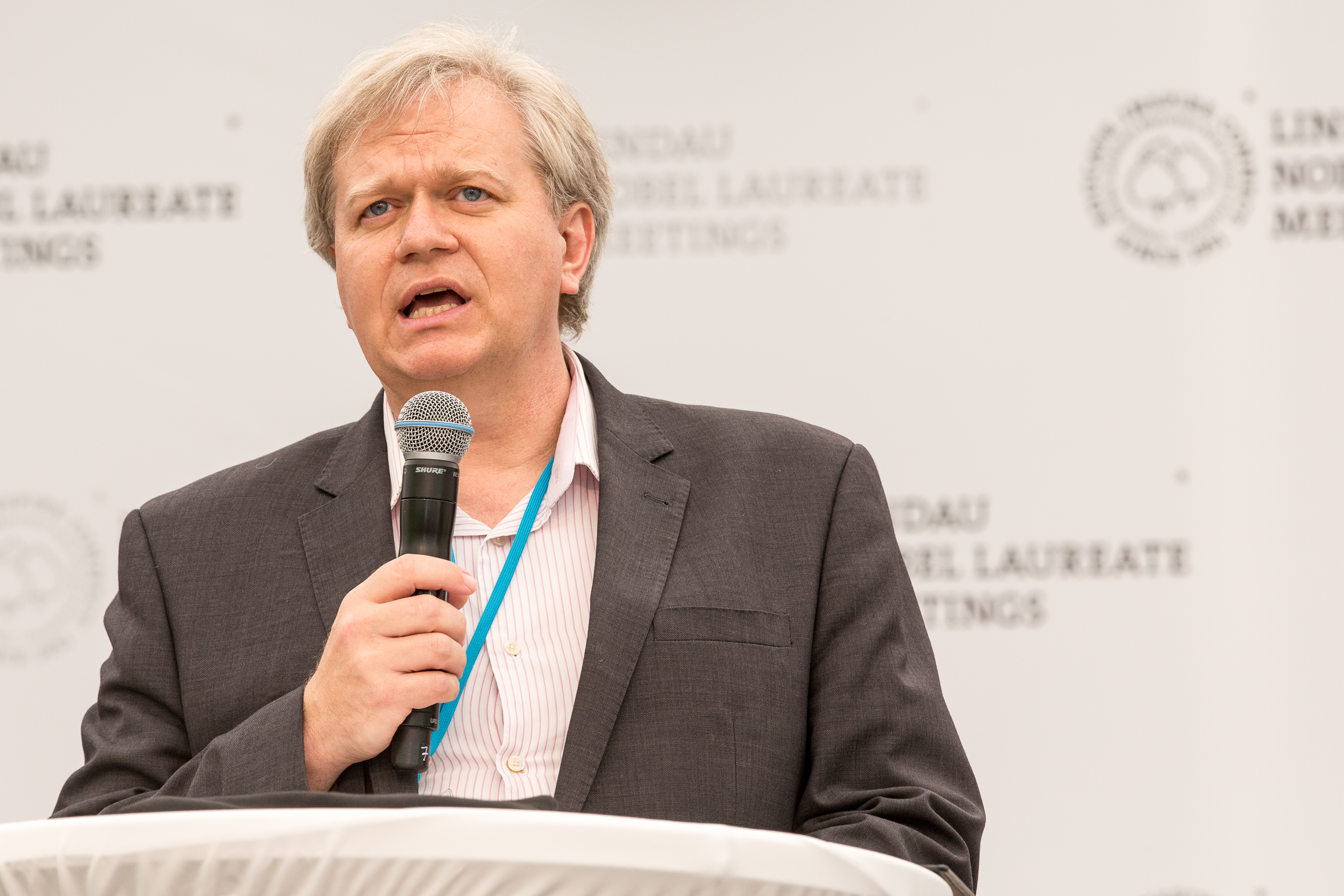
Nobel laureate Brian Schmidt reading the Mainau Declaration 2015 on Climate Change on the final day of the 65th Lindau Nobel Laureate Meeting. Photo: Christian Flemming

=== Signatories and supporters ===
The following Nobel laureates have thus far signed the Mainau Declaration 2015 or expressed their full support after its presentation. 36 Nobel laureates (left column) signed the declaration on 3 July 2015 on the final day of the 65th Lindau Nobel Laureate Meeting; 40 agreed later on for their names to be listed as signatories.

Initial signatories	Additional supporters
Peter Agre	Hiroshi Amano
J.M. Bishop	David Baltimore
Elizabeth Blackburn	Aaron Ciechanover
Martin Chalfie	Elias Corey
Steven Chu	Robert Curl
Claude Cohen-Tannoudji	Johann Deisenhofer
James W. Cronin	Sheldon Glashow
Peter Doherty	Robert Grubbs
Gerhard Ertl	Leland Hartwell
Edmond Fischer	Dudley Herschbach
Walter Gilbert	Roald Hoffmann
Roy Glauber	Wolfgang Ketterle
David Gross	Walter Kohn
John L. Hall	Yuan T. Lee
Serge Haroche	Michael Levitt
Stefan Hell	John Mather
Jules H. Hoffmann	Arthur B. McDonald
Klaus von Klitzing	Edvard Moser
Harold Kroto	May-Britt Moser
William Moerner	Ryoji Noyori
Ferid Murad	Paul Nurse
Ei-ichi Negishi	John O'Keefe
Saul Perlmutter	Douglas Osheroff
William Phillips	Arno Penzias
Richard Roberts	Carlo Rubbia
Kailash Satyarthi	Oliver Smithies
Brian Schmidt	Jack Steinberger
Hamilton O. Smith	Thomas Steitz
George Smoot	Horst Störmer
Jack Szostak	Thomas Südhof
Roger Y. Tsien	John Sulston
Harold Varmus	Joseph H. Taylor
J. Robin Warren	Carl Wieman
Arieh Warshel	David Wineland
Torsten Wiesel	
Robert Wilson	

== Mainau Declaration 2024 ==
The third Mainau declaration, titled Mainau Declaration 2024 on Nuclear Weapons was announced and signed on July 5, 2024 at the 73rd Lindau Nobel Laureate meeting on Mainau Island. The document was read in full by physics laureate David Gross and then signed in front of the audience of young scientists by all 22 present Nobel laureates in physics and chemistry. The full document has signatures from 30 laureates in physics and chemistry.

Similarly to the Mainau Declaration 2015, the following Nobel laureates (left column) have signed the Mainau Declaration 2024 on the day of its announcement, while other laureates have later agreed to add their names to the list of signatories (right column):

Initial signatories	Additional supporters (as of 26 September 2024)
Alain Aspect	Peter Agre
J. Georg Bednorz	Harvey J. Alter
Steven Chu	Werner Arber
Johann Deisenhofer	Robert J. Aumann
Reinhard Genzel	Barry C. Barish
Walter Gilbert	Françoise Barré-Sinoussi
David J. Gross	Elizabeth H. Blackburn
F. Duncan M. Haldane	Mario R. Capecchi
Theodor W. Hänsch	Thomas R. Cech
Serge Haroche	Martin Chalfie
Stefan W. Hell	Emmanuelle Charpentier
Richard Henderson	Elias J. Corey
Gerardus ’t Hooft	Peter C. Doherty
Brian D. Josephson	Baron François Englert
Takaaki Kajita	Gerhard Ertl
Klaus Klitzing	Sir Martin J. Evans
J. Michael Kosterlitz	Albert Fert
Anne L’Huillier	Joachim Frank
John C. Mather	Jerome I. Friedman
Hartmut Michel	Sir Andre K. Geim
W.E. Moerner	Sheldon L. Glashow
Saul Perlmutter	Jeffrey C. Hall
William D. Phillips	Alan J. Heeger
Didier Queloz	Avram Hershko
Brian P. Schmidt	Jules A. Hoffmann
Dan Shechtman	Roald Hoffmann
George F. Smoot	Tim Hunt
Donna Strickland	Louis J. Ignarro
David J. Wineland	William G. Kaelin Jr.
Kurt Wüthrich	Katalin Karikó
	Tawakkol Karman
	Brian K. Kobilka
	Ferenc Krausz
	Finn E. Kydland
	Robert B. Laughlin
	Yuan Tseh Lee
	Jean-Marie Lehn
	Michael Levitt
	Tomas Lindahl
	Benjamin List
	Sir David W.C. MacMillan
	Eric S. Maskin
	Michel Mayor
	Arthur B. McDonald
	Daniel L. McFadden
	Morten Meldal
	Edvard I. Moser
	May-Britt Moser
	Erwin Neher
	Ryoji Noyori
	Sir Paul M. Nurse
	Giorgio Parisi
	Edmund S. Phelps
	Sir Christopher A. Pissarides
	Venki Ramakrishnan
	José Ramos-Horta
	Charles M. Rice
	Sir Richard J. Roberts
	Michael M. Rosbash
	Kailash Satyarthi
	Jean-Pierre Sauvage
	Randy W. Schekman
	Richard R. Schrock
	Phillip A. Sharp
	Vernon L. Smith
	Wole Soyinka
	Sir J. Fraser Stoddart
	Thomas C. Südhof
	Jack W. Szostak
	Sir John E. Walker
	Arieh Warshel
	M. Stanley Whittingham
	Torsten N. Wiesel
	Robert B. Wilson

Additionally, over 600 Lindau Alumni added their names in support of the Mainau Declaration 2024.

== See also ==
- Lindau Nobel Laureate Meetings
