= Einstein Prize for Laser Science =

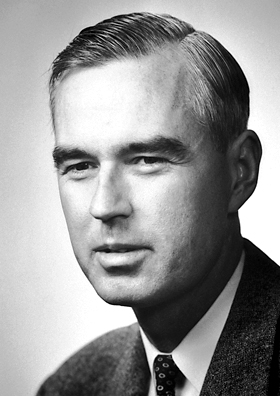
Willis E. Lamb

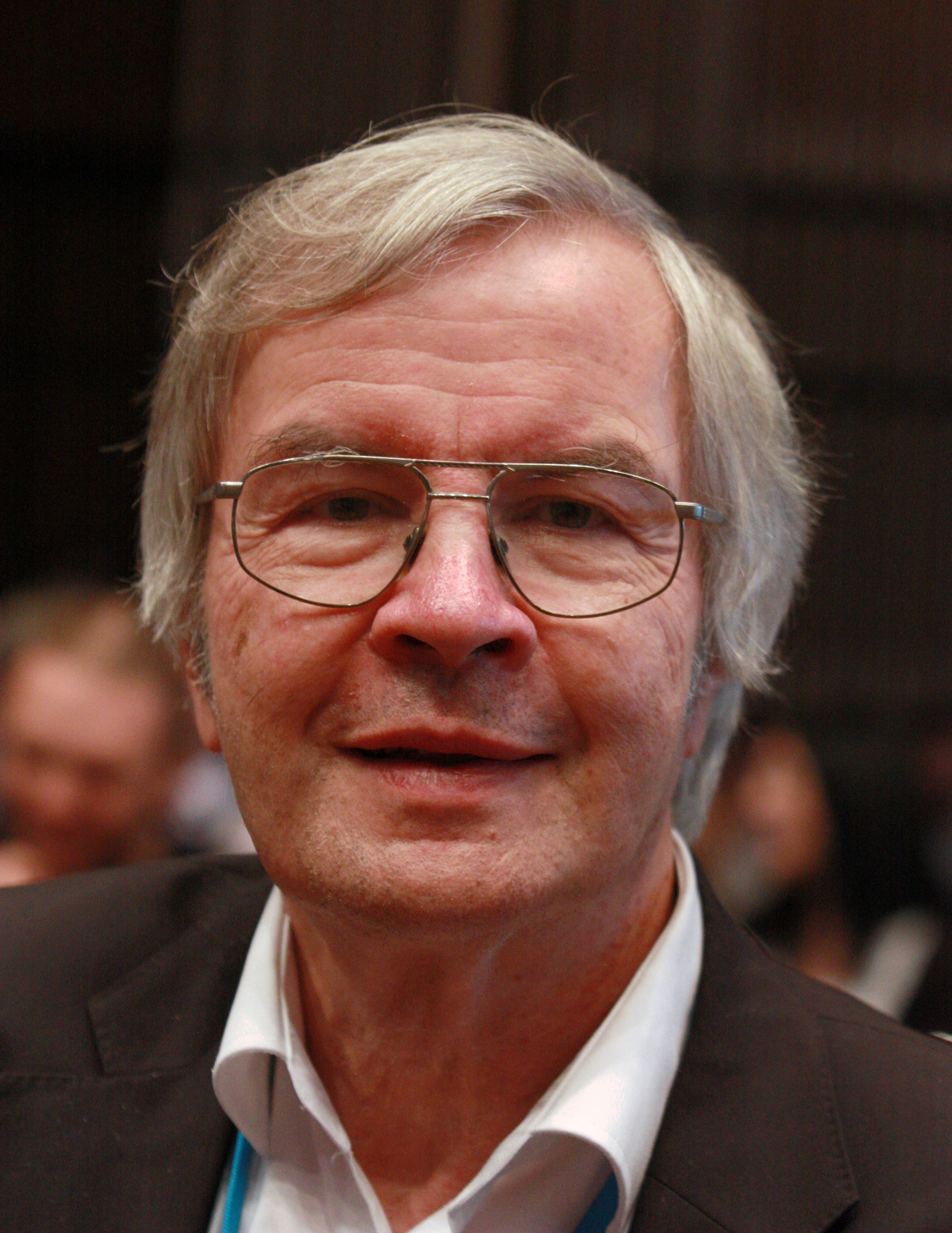
1995 recipient Theodor W. Hänsch

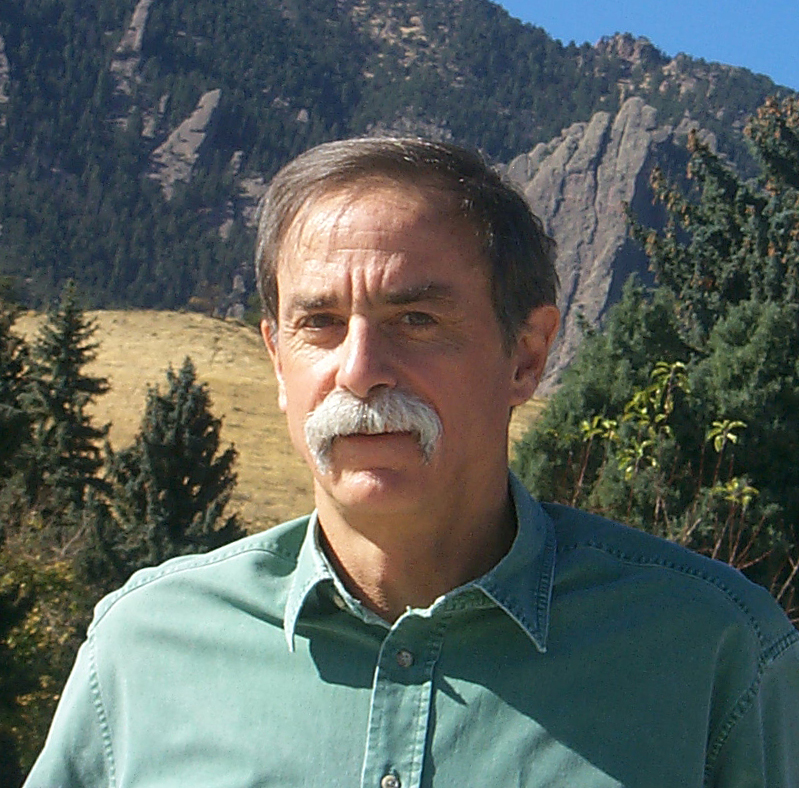
1996 recipient David J. Wineland

The Einstein Prize for Laser Science was a recognition awarded by the former Society for Optical and Quantum Electronics and sponsored by the Eastman Kodak Company. The prize, awarded in the 1988–1999 period, consisted of a 3-inch brass medal including Einstein's image and a depiction of a two-level transition including the A and B coefficients. Recipients of the prize include:

- Serge Haroche, 1988
- Herbert Walther, 1988
- H. Jeff Kimble, 1989
- Richart E. Slusher, 1989
- Carlton M. Caves, 1990
- Daniel Frank Walls, 1990
- S. E. Harris, 1991
- L. M. Narducci, 1991
- John L. Hall, 1992
- Willis E. Lamb, 1992
- Raymond Chiao, 1993
- Norman F. Ramsey, 1993
- G. S. Agarwal, 1994
- Theodor W. Hänsch, 1995
- Carl E. Wieman, 1995
- David J. Wineland, 1996
- Peter L. Knight, 1996
- Paul Corkum, 1999

In retrospect, the prize was mainly awarded for significant contributions in quantum optics. Two recipients of the Einstein Prize for Laser Science were already Nobel laureates in physics (W. E. Lamb and N. F. Ramsey) and five other recipients went on to win the Nobel Prize in Physics (S. Haroche, J. L. Hall, T. W. Hänsch, C. E. Wieman, and D. J. Wineland). Presentation of the prize was done at the Lasers'88 to Lasers'99 conferences.

Note: the official name of these conferences was The International Conference on Lasers and Applications, Lasers 'XX.

== See also ==
- List of physics awards

== External links: group photographs ==
- Group photograph at Lasers'92 including, right to left, Marlan Scully, Willis Lamb, John L. Hall, and F. J. Duarte.
- Group photograph at Lasers'93 including (right to left) Norman F. Ramsey, Marlan Scully, and F. J. Duarte.
- Group photograph at Lasers'95 including (right to left) Marlan Scully, Theodor W. Hänsch, Carl E. Wieman, and F. J. Duarte.
