= Arthur L. Schawlow Prize in Laser Science =

- Description: Award recognizing outstanding contributions to basic research using lasers to advance knowledge of the fundamental physical properties of materials and their interaction with light
- Country: United States
- Presented by: American Physical Society

The Arthur L. Schawlow Prize in Laser Science is a prize that has been awarded annually by the American Physical Society since 1991. The recipient is chosen for "outstanding contributions to basic research which uses lasers to advance our knowledge of the fundamental physical properties of materials and their interaction with light". The prize is named after Arthur L. Schawlow (1921–1999), laser pioneer and a Nobel laureate in physics, and as of 2007 is valued at $10,000.

== Recipients ==
- 2026 Alexander Gaeta
- 2025 Vladan Vuletic
- 2024 Howard M. Milchberg
- 2023 Demetrios N. Christodoulides
- 2022 Tony F. Heinz
- 2021 Peter J. Delfyett, Jr.
- 2020 Shaul Mukamel
- 2019 Steven T. Cundiff
- 2018 Gérard Albert Mourou
- 2017 Louis F. DiMauro
- 2016 Robert W. Boyd
- 2015 Christopher Monroe
- 2014 Mordechai Segev
- 2013 Robert Alfano
- 2012 Michael D. Fayer
- 2011 Jorge Rocca
- 2010 Henry C. Kapteyn, Margaret M. Murnane
- 2009 Robert W. Field
- 2008 James Bergquist
- 2007 Szymon Suckewer
- 2006 Paul B. Corkum
- 2005 Marlan O. Scully
- 2004 Federico Capasso
- 2003 David E. Pritchard
- 2002 Stephen E. Harris
- 2001 David J. Wineland
- 2000 Richard Neil Zare
- 1999 Carl E. Wieman
- 1998 William D. Phillips
- 1997 Charles V. Shank, Erich Peter Ippen
- 1996 Theodor W. Hänsch
- 1995 Richart E. Slusher
- 1994 Steven Chu
- 1993 John L. Hall
- 1992 Yuen-Ron Shen
- 1991 Peter P. Sorokin

== See also ==
- List of physics awards
- List of prizes named after people
