= Berthold-Georg Englert =

German physicist

Berthold-Georg Englert (born 1953) is Provost's Chair Professor at the Beijing Institute of Technology, and Principal Investigator at the Centre for Quantum Technologies. In 2006, he was recognized for outstanding contributions to theoretical research on quantum coherence. Englert's principal research interests concern applications in quantum information science, but he is also known for his early work on quantum optics together with Marlan Scully at Texas A&M University.

== Education and career ==
Englert studied physics at the University of Tübingen and obtained his Ph.D. in Physics there in 1981. He did post-doctoral research at LMU Munich and obtained his Dr. rer. nat. habil. in 1990. He subsequently worked as a researcher at LMU until 1995 and then held different visiting professorships in Europe and the United States until he joined the faculty of the National University of Singapore in 2003. Since 2023 he is Chair Professor at the Beijing Institute of Technology and Visiting Professor at CQT in Singapore.

Englert was named American Physical Society (APS) Outstanding Referee in 2008, he is Fellow of the Institute of Physics Singapore (IPS) since 2012, Fellow of the APS since 2015, and recipient of the IPS President Medal for 2019. He is the Scientific Secretary of the Julian Schwinger Foundation.

== Scientific contributions ==
Englert is the author of more than 180 publications in the fields of atomic, molecular and optical physics. As of November 2023 his research has been cited more than 7,600 times for a h index of 41.

Englert's most cited works are from the areas of quantum optics and quantum information. With Marlan Scully and Herbert Walther, he proposed a quantum optical test of quantum mechanical complementarity. He also derived an inequality by which the visibility of interference fringes in interferometer experiments sets an upper bound on the which-way information available.

In 1998 he studied with three co-authors he studied the interaction of two ultracold atoms in a three-dimensional trap and obtained an analytical solution which extended the previously known one- and two-dimensional limiting cases to the more realistic three-dimensional one.

He is co-author of frequently cited reviews on cavity quantum electrodynamics and on mutually unbiased bases.

He edited and published Symbolism of Atomic Measurements based on lecture notes by Julian Schwinger, which has been called „a delight and a wonderful resource to a theoretical physicist“ and judged to come as close as possible to the „definitive textbook“ on quantum mechanics that Schwinger had intended to write.

== Honors and awards ==
In 2015, Englert was inducted as a fellow of the American Physical Society for "distinctive theoretical contributions to the foundations, interpretation, and applications of quantum mechanics".

== See also ==
- Englert–Greenberger duality relation
