= Wolfgang P. Schleich =

German theoretical physicist (born 1957)

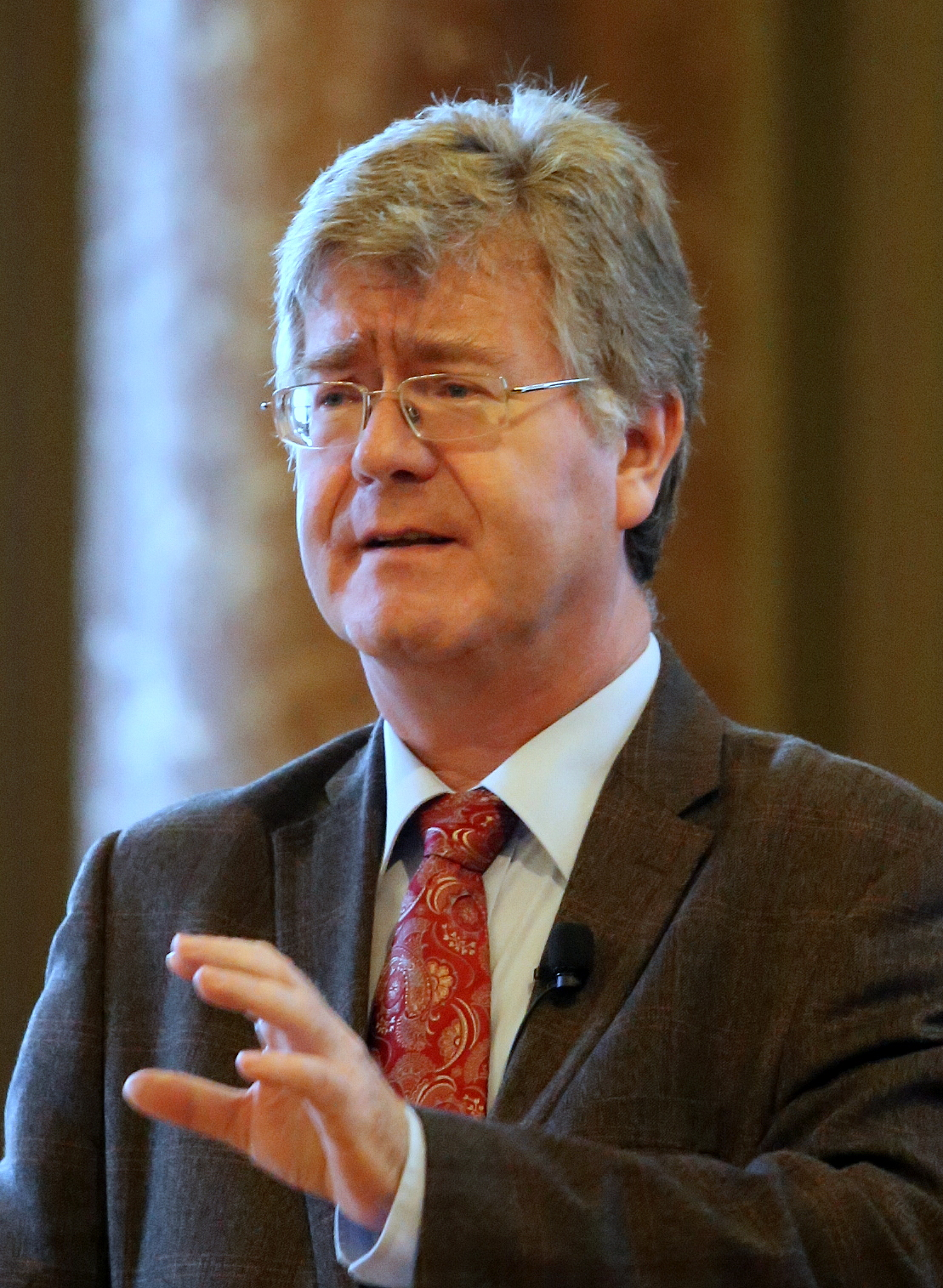
- Schleich in Budapest, 2013
- Born: February 23, 1957 (age 69); Mühldorf am Inn, Germany

Academic background
- Education: LMU Munich
- Thesis: Optische Tests der allgemeinen Relativitätstheorie (1984)
- Doctoral advisor: Marlan O. Scully
- Other advisors: John Archibald Wheeler; Herbert Walther

Academic work
- Institutions: Max Planck Institute of Quantum Optics; University of Ulm

Wolfgang Peter Schleich (born 23 February 1957) is professor of theoretical physics and director of the quantum physics department at the University of Ulm.

== Education, work and career ==
From 1980 to 1984, Schleich performed work on his diploma thesis and his Ph.D. with Marlan O. Scully at LMU Munich, with an intermediate research visit at the Institute of Modern Optics, Albuquerque, United States from 1982 to 1983. After completion of his Ph.D., he performed post-doctorate research with John Archibald Wheeler at the Center for Theoretical Physics in Austin, Texas.

From 1986 to 1991, he worked as a research scientist at the Max Planck Institute of Quantum Optics in Garching under Herbert Walther. In 1991, Schleich was nominated professor of theoretical physics at the University of Ulm. Schleich is author of several books, including Quantum Optics in Phase Space and Elements of quantum information.

His areas of research include the foundations of quantum physics, as well as quantum mechanics in relation to general relativity and to number theory. His recent work includes elaborations on the role of the Wigner function in terms of quantum optics.

== Awards ==
- 1983: Otto Hahn Medal
- 1991: Physics Award of the Deutsche Physikalische Gesellschaft
- 1993: Ernst Abbe Medal
- 1995: Gottfried Wilhelm Leibniz Prize
- 1997: Fellow of the Optical Society
- 2002: Max Planck Research Award
- 2007: First Class Medal of the Czech Technical University in Prague
- 2008: Willis E. Lamb Award for Laser Science and Quantum Optics
- 2008: Distinguished Professor at the University of North Texas
- 2021: Herbert Walther Award

== Publications ==
- Schleich, Wolfgang (2007). Elements of quantum information. Weinheim: Wiley-VCH. ISBN 978-3-527-40725-5. OCLC 181348428.
- Schleich, Wolfgang (2001). Quantum optics in phase space. Berlin New York: Wiley-VCH. ISBN 978-3-527-29435-0. OCLC 41017894.
- Scully, Marlan (2000). Ode to a quantum physicist : a festschrift in honor of Marlan O. Scully. Amsterdam Oxford: Elsevier. ISBN 978-0-444-50538-5. OCLC 45304737.
- Wolfgang Schleich: Optische Tests der allgemeinen Relativitätstheorie, Universität München (Ph.D. thesis) / Max-Planck-Institut für Quantenoptik, 1984
- Wolfgang Schleich: Quantenfluktuationen in Ringlaser-Gyroskopen, Max-Planck-Institut für Quantenoptik (Diplom thesis), 1981
