= Richart E. Slusher =

Researcher and scientist (born 1938)

- Born: 1938 (age 87–88)
- Education: University of California at Berkeley (PhD)
- Known for: Optics; quantum information science
- Scientific career
- Workplaces: Georgia Tech Research Institute; Bell Laboratories

Richart Elliott Slusher (born 1938) is a regents researcher and a principal research scientist at the Georgia Tech Research Institute, and the director of the Georgia Tech Quantum Institute.

== Early life and education ==
Slusher was born in 1938. He received a Ph.D. in physics from the University of California at Berkeley in 1965.

== Career ==
Slusher worked at Bell Laboratories from 1965 to 2007, where he directed a research department focused on optical and quantum device physics from 1977 to 2005. Since 2005, he has worked at the Georgia Tech Research Institute.

== Awards ==
Slusher received the 1989 Einstein Prize for Laser Science, the 1995 Arthur L. Schawlow Prize in Laser Science from the American Physical Society and the 2006 Max Born Award from the Optical Society of America.
