= Georgia Tech Quantum Institute =

Research center on quantum computing

- Company type: Nonprofit
- Industry: Quantum information science
- Headquarters: Atlanta, Georgia, USA
- Key people: Richart E. Slusher; Director
- Parent: Georgia Tech Research Institute
- Website: www.gtqi.gatech.edu

The Georgia Tech Quantum Institute is a multi-disciplinary research center within the Georgia Tech Research Institute and the Georgia Institute of Technology that focuses on research within quantum computing and related fields.

== History ==
In 2010, researchers produced microfabricated planar ion traps for theoretical use in a trapped ion quantum computer.
