= Mordechai Segev =

Israeli physicist

Mordechai "Moti" Segev
- מרדכי "מוטי" שגב
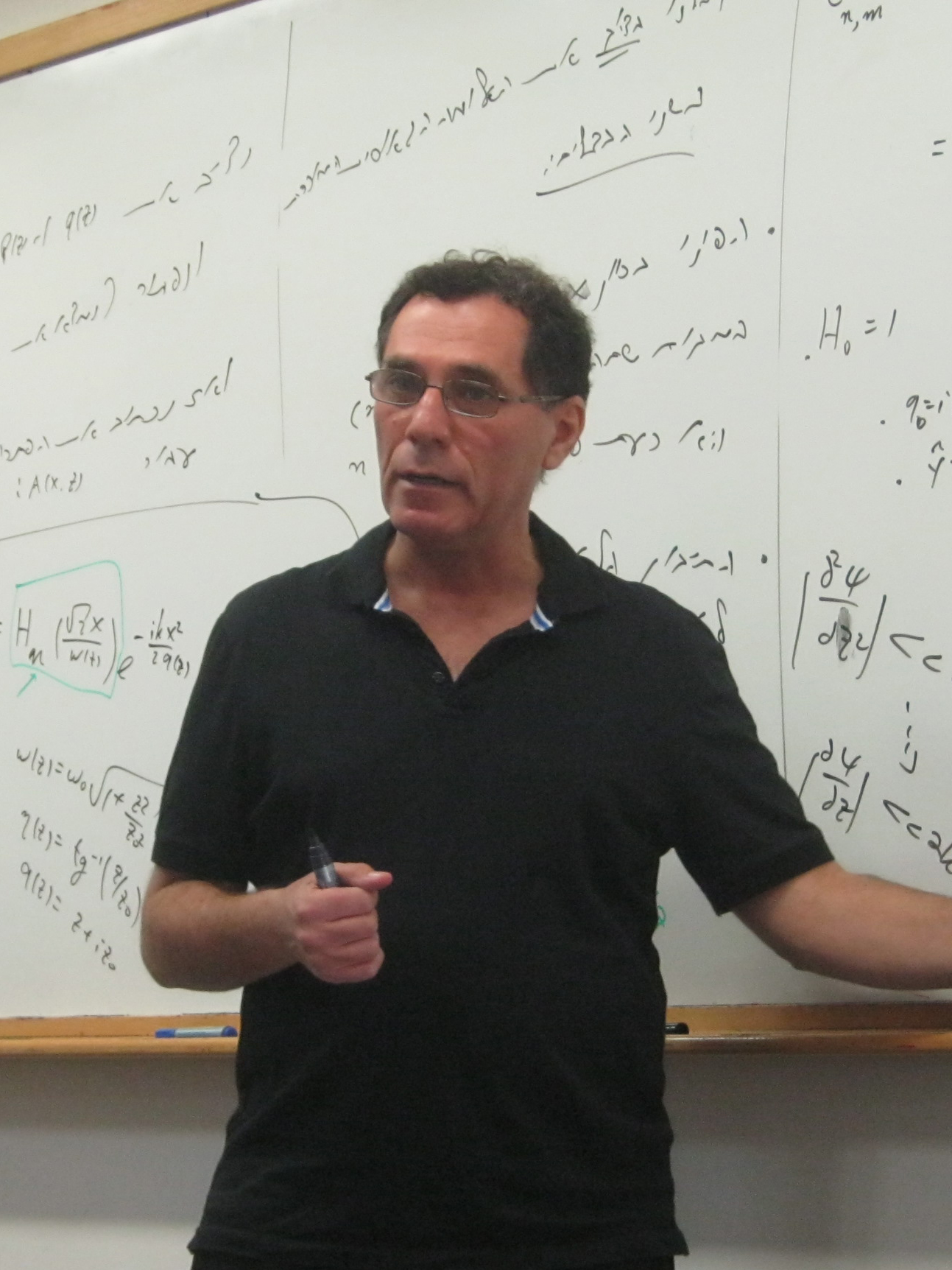
- Born: 1958 (age 67–68); Romania
- Occupation: Physicist
- Known for: Work on lasers, nonlinear optics, solitons, and quantum optics
- Spouse(s): Orit Wolf (Prof. & Pianist)
- Children: Yair, Tamir & Yaron
- Awards: Israel Prize (2014); EMET Prize (2019); Rothschild Prize in Physics (2024)

Mordechai "Moti" Segev (Hebrew: מרדכי "מוטי" שגב) is an Israeli physicist at the Technion who is known for his work on lasers, nonlinear optics, solitons, and quantum optics.

== Career ==
Born in Romania in 1958, Segev emigrated with his family to Israel at the age of 3. He studied physics at the Technion – Israel Institute of Technology, earning his bachelor's degree in 1985 and his Ph.D. in 1990. After earning his Ph.D., he worked as a postdoctoral researcher at the California Institute of Technology. He then went to Princeton University in 1994 as an assistant professor, and he was promoted to associate professor in 1997 and full professor in 1999. In 1998 Segev returned to work as a professor at the Technion. In 2009 he was appointed the Robert J. Shillman Distinguished Professor of Physics and Electrical Engineering.

In the 1990s, Segev discovered photorefractive spatial solitons and incoherent solitons (or random-phase solitons). He called this the phenomenon of self-trapping in incoherent white light, and he was the first to find solitons in a two-dimensional lattice. He was also the first to demonstrate Anderson localization in a perturbed periodic system.

== Honors and awards ==
- 1995-1997 Sloan Research Fellowship
- 1997 Fellow of Optica
- 2000 Fellow of the American Physical Society
- 2007 Quantum Electronics Prize of the European Physical Society
- 2009 Max Born Award
- 2011 Member of the Israel Academy of Sciences and Humanities
- 2014 Arthur L. Schawlow Prize in Laser Science
- 2014 Israel Prize
- 2015 Elected to the National Academy of Sciences
- 2019 EMET Prize
- 2021 Elected to the American Academy of Arts and Sciences
- 2024 Rothschild Prize in Physics
