= Eric Van Stryland =

American physicist

- Education: University of Arizona
- Scientific career
- Fields: Physics
- Workplaces: University of Central Florida, School of Optics/CREOL
- Doctoral advisor: Marlan Scully

Eric Van Stryland was president of the Optical Society of America in 2005.

Eric Van Stryland received the Physics PhD degree in 1976, from the University of Arizona, Optical Sciences Center, Tucson, Arizona, where he worked on optical coherent transients and photon counting statistics. He worked in the areas of femtosecond pulse production, multiphoton absorption in solids, and laser induced damage at the Center for Laser Studies at the University of Southern California. He joined the Physics Department at the University of North Texas in 1978 helping to form the Center for Applied Quantum Electronics. In 1987 he joined the newly formed CREOL (Center for Research and Education in Optics and Lasers) at the University of Central Florida, where he was professor of physics and electrical and computer engineering. The National Science Foundation has funded him for the past 29 years, and he has been performing research for the Department of Defense for a similar period. His current research interests are in the characterization of the nonlinear optical properties of materials and their temporal response as well as the applications of these nonlinear materials properties for sensor protection, switching, beam control etc. He helped develop the Z-scan technique with Mansoor Sheik-Bahae with whom he also established the methodology for applying Kramers-Kronig relations to ultrafast nonlinearities. This also led to the understanding of cascaded second-order nonlinearities.

He is a fellow of the Optical Society of America, a former member of their board of directors and co-chair of the Science and Engineering Council, a fellow of the SPIE, senior member of the Laser Institute of America and a former board member, a fellow of IEEE LEOS and a member of the APS, and MRS. He also served as a topical editor for Optics Letters. In 2012, he received OSA's R. W. Wood Prize. He has graduated 25 Ph.D.s and published well in excess of 100 papers. In 2003 he was awarded the highest honor UCF bestows, the Pegasus Award.

He was director of the School of Optics/CREOL from July 1999 to May 2004. With the elevation of the School to the first College of Optics and Photonics, he became the dean of the college and served in that capacity until 2009. In addition Governor Jeb Bush established the Florida Photonics Center of Excellence (FPCE) in 2003 and he is the director of that center along with CREOL, both centers within the college.

== See also ==
- OSA presidents
