= Serge Haroche =

French physicist, Nobel laureate (born 1944)

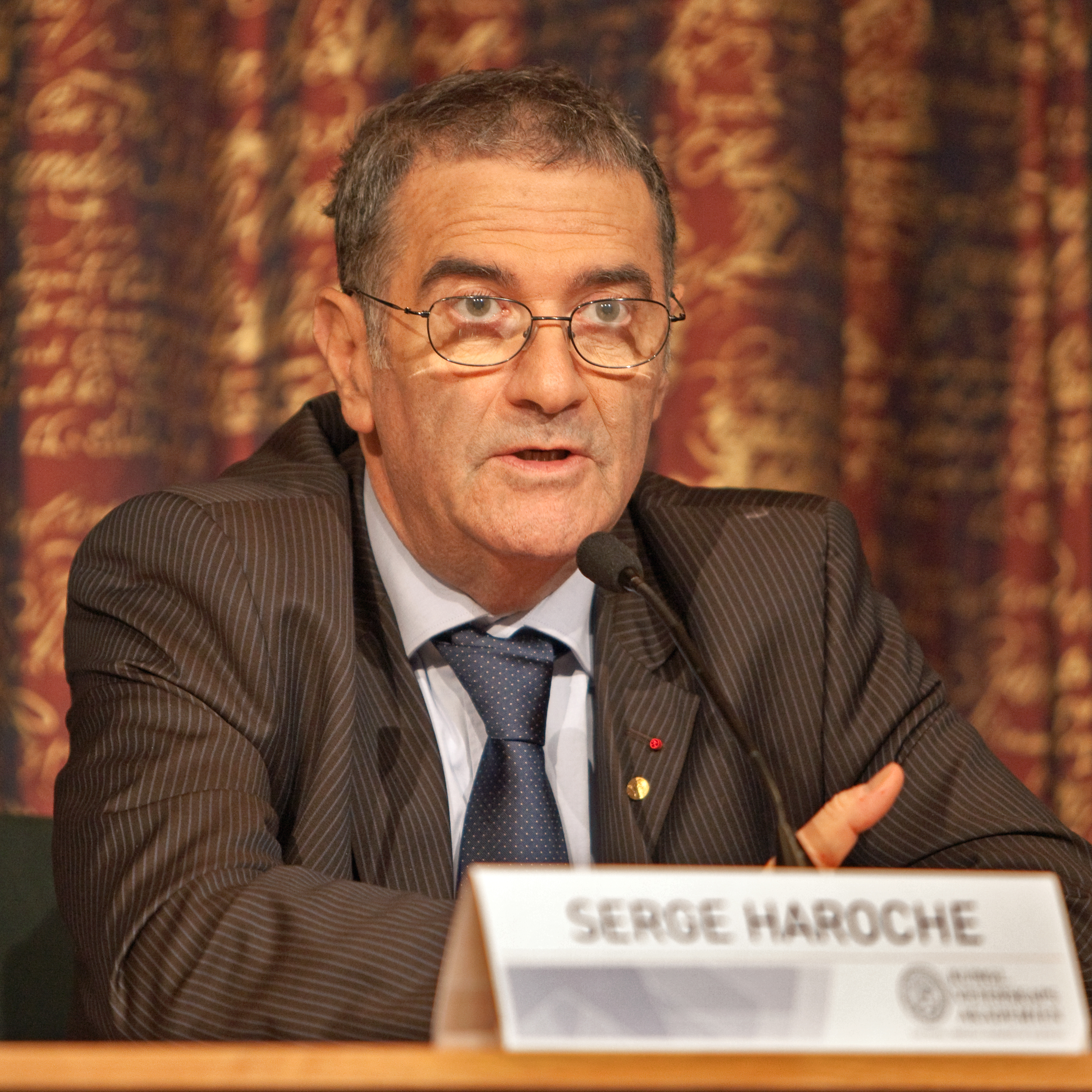
- Haroche in Stockholm, 2012
- Born: 11 September 1944 (age 82); Casablanca, French Morocco
- Citizenship: French
- Education: École normale supérieure Pierre and Marie Curie University (PhD)
- Known for: Cavity quantum electrodynamics
- Awards: CNRS Gold medal (2009); Nobel Prize for Physics (2012)
- Scientific career
- Workplaces: Pierre-and-Marie-Curie University; Yale University; Collège de France
- Doctoral advisor: Claude Cohen-Tannoudji
- Website: www.college-de-france.fr/site/en-serge-haroche

Serge Haroche (French pronunciation: [sɛʁʒ aʁɔʃ]; born 11 September 1944) is a French physicist who was awarded the 2012 Nobel Prize for Physics jointly with David J. Wineland for "ground-breaking experimental methods that enable measuring and manipulation of individual quantum systems", a study of the particle of light, the photon. This and his other works developed laser spectroscopy. Since 2001, Haroche is a professor at the Collège de France and holds the chair of quantum physics and in 2022 he had the Fermi Chair of Physics at University of Rome La Sapienza.

In 1971 he defended his doctoral thesis in physics at the University of Paris VI: his research had been conducted under the direction of Claude Cohen-Tannoudji.

== Early life and education ==
Haroche was born in Casablanca to Albert Haroche (1920–1998), from a Moroccan Jewish family, and Valentine Haroche, born Roubleva (1921–1998), a teacher who was born in Odessa to a Jewish family of physicians who relocated to Morocco in the early 1920s. His family had mixed Sephardic and Ashkenazi origins. His father, a lawyer trained in Rabat, was one of seven children born to a family of teachers, Isaac and Esther Haroche, who worked at the École de l'Alliance israélite (AIU).

Both paternal grandparents of Serge Haroche had been AIU students in their respective hometowns of Marrakesh and Tétouan (the school which Esther Azerad attended in Tétouan had been founded in 1862; it was the first school of the AIU network).

Haroche's family left Morocco in 1956 at the end of the French protectorate treaty, and settled in France.

== Career ==
Haroche worked in the Centre national de la recherche scientifique (CNRS) as a research scientist from 1967 to 1975 at the French UMR Kastler–Brossel Laboratory, and spent a year (1972–1973) as a visiting post-doc in Stanford University, in Arthur Leonard Schawlow's team. In 1975 he moved to a professor position at Paris VI University. At the same time he taught in other institutions, in particular at the École polytechnique (1973–1984), MIT (1980), Harvard University (1981), Yale University (1984–1993) and Conservatoire national des arts et métiers (2000). He was head of the Physics department at the École normale supérieure from 1994 to 2000.

Since 2001, Haroche has been a professor at the Collège de France and holds the chair of quantum physics. He is a member of the Société Française de Physique, the European Physical society and a fellow and member of the American Physical Society.

In September 2012, Serge Haroche was elected by his peers to the position of administrator of the Collège de France.

On 9 October 2012 Haroche was awarded the Nobel Prize in Physics, together with the American physicist David Wineland, for their work regarding measurement and manipulation of individual quantum systems.

In 2020, Haroche was appointed by European Commissioner for Innovation, Research, Culture, Education and Youth Mariya Gabriel to serve on an independent search committee for the next president of the European Research Council (ERC), chaired by Helga Nowotny. in 2022 he had the Fermi Chair of Physics at University of Rome La Sapienza.

== Research ==
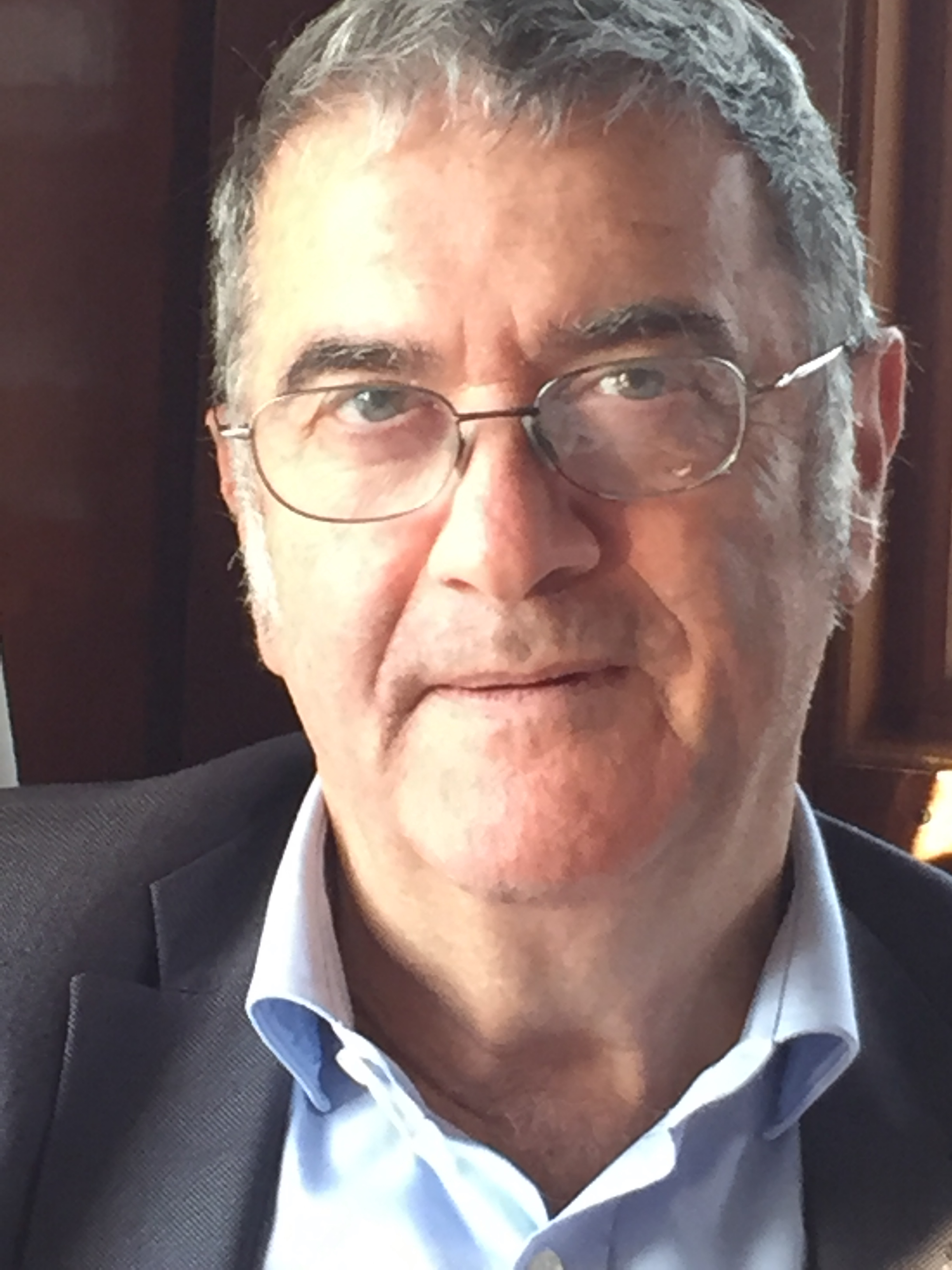
Haroche, who won Nobel Prize in Physics in 2012, visited Stockholm, June 2016, as a member of the Wallenberg Foundation Scientific Advisory Board.

Haroche works primarily in atomic physics and quantum optics. He is principally known for showing quantum decoherence by experimental observation, while working with colleagues at the École normale supérieure in Paris in 1996.

After a PhD dissertation on dressed atoms under the supervision of Claude Cohen-Tannoudji (who would receive the 1997 Nobel Prize) from 1967 to 1971, he developed new methods for laser spectroscopy, based on the study of quantum beats and superradiance. He then moved on to Rydberg atoms, giant atomic states particularly sensitive to microwaves, which makes them well adapted for studying the interactions between light and matter. He showed that such atoms, coupled to a superconducting cavity containing a few photons, are well-suited to the testing of quantum decoherence and to the realization of quantum logic operations necessary for the treatment of quantum information.

== Awards ==
Haroche after his Nobel lecture

- 1988: Einstein Prize for Laser Science (awarded at Lasers '88)
- 1990: Fellow of the American Physical Society
- 1992: The Humboldt Prize
- 1993: Albert A. Michelson Medal by the Franklin Institute
- 2007: Charles Hard Townes Award by the OSA
- 2009: CNRS Gold medal
- 2010: Herbert Walther Award
- 2012: Nobel Prize in Physics (shared with David J. Wineland)
- 2017: IEEE Honorary Membership
- 2017: Grand Officer of the Legion of Honour

== Personal life ==
Haroche lives in Paris; he is married to the sociologist Claudine Haroche (née Zeligson), also descending from the Russian Jewish émigrés family, with two children. He is the uncle of French singer–songwriter and actor Raphaël Haroche (known as Raphaël, his stage name).

== Bibliography ==
- Haroche, Serge; Raimond, Jean-Michel (10 August 2006). Exploring the Quantum. Oxford University Press. doi:10.1093/acprof:oso/9780198509141.001.0001. ISBN 978-0-19-850914-1.

== See also ==
- List of nonreligious Nobel laureates
- Quantum decoherence
- Ramsey interferometry
- List of Jewish Nobel laureates
