= Peter Delfyett =

American engineer (born 1959)

Peter J. Delfyett Jr
- Born: March 8, 1959 (age 67)
- Education: City College of New York (BS, PhD); University of Rochester (MS)
- Scientific career
- Workplaces: University of Central Florida College of Optics and Photonics

Peter J. Delfyett Jr (born March 8, 1959) is an American engineer and Pegasus Professor and Trustee Chair Professor of Optics, ECE & Physics at the University of Central Florida College of Optics and Photonics.

He was awarded the 1996 Presidential Early Career Award for Scientists and Engineers.

He is a Fellow of the American Physical Society and The Optical Society. Delfyett was also elected a member of the National Academy of Engineering in 2021 for contributions to development and commercialization of low-noise, high-power ultrafast semiconductor lasers.

== Early life and education ==
Delfyett, who is African-American, was born in Queens, New York. When he was in his first grade he was taken to see the film Journey to the Beginning of Time. As a child he played the drums and basketball. He attended the City College of New York, where he studied electrical engineering. Whilst he was a sophomore Delfyett became interested in optics. He was mentored by Robert Alfano. He moved to the University of Rochester for his graduate studies, where he earned a master's degree in 1983. After graduating he returned to the City College of New York for a doctoral degree, re-joining the laboratory of Alfano. His doctoral research focussed on ultrafast spectroscopy. After graduating, Delfyett joined Bell Communication Research (now Iconectiv) where he worked on semiconductor lasers. At Bellcore, Delfyett created the highest power mode-locked diode laser in the world.

== Research and career ==
In 1993 Delfyett moved to the University of Central Florida College of Optics and Photonics (CREOL), where he was made the Professor of Optics and Photonics. Here he established an Ultrafast Photonics group who worked on semiconductor lasers. He developed the semiconductor laser diode that could achieve the shortest and most intense laser pulse in the world.

=== Academic service ===
Delfyett was a founding member of the National Science Foundation Scientists and Engineers in the School Program. He has served as Editor-in-Chief of the IEEE Journal of Selected Topics in Quantum Electronics and the IEEE Photonics Technology Letters. From 2005-2007 Delfyett served as Director at Large on The Optical Society Board of Directors. In 2020 Delfyett joined the Optica Diversity, Equity and Inclusion Rapid Action Committee.

== Awards and honors ==
- 1993 Black Engineer of the Year Award.
- 2002 Elected Fellow of IEEE for the development and application of high-speed photonic device technology based on mode-locked semiconductor diode lasers.
- 2004 Elected Fellow of The Optical Society.
- 2011 American Physical Society Edward A. Bouchet Award.
- 2013 National Academy of Inventors Fellow.
- 2013 President of the National Society of Black Physicists.
- 2013 Faculty Excellence for Mentoring Doctoral Students.
- 2014 Medalist from the Florida Academy of Science.
- 2016 Elected Fellow of SPIE.
- 2018 City University of New York Townsend Harris Award.
- 2020 IEEE Photonics Society William Streifer Scientific Achievement Award.
- 2021 Arthur L. Schawlow Prize in Laser Science, American Physical Society.
- 2021 Member of the National Academy of Engineering.
- 2024 Florida Inventors Hall of Fame.

== Selected publications ==
- Delfyett, Peter J.; Gee, Sangyoun; Choi, Myoung-Taek; Izadpanah, Hossein; Lee, Wangkuen; Ozharar, Sarper; Quinlan, Franklyn; Yilmaz, Tolga (2006-07-01). "Optical Frequency Combs From Semiconductor Lasers and Applications in Ultrawideband Signal Processing and Communications". Journal of Lightwave Technology. 24 (7): 2701. Bibcode:2006JLwT...24.2701D. doi:10.1109/JLT.2006.875948. S2CID 42753039.
- Delfyett, P.J.; Florez, L.T.; Stoffel, N.; Gmitter, T.; Andreadakis, N.C.; Silberberg, Y.; Heritage, J.P.; Alphonse, G.A. (1992). "High-power ultrafast laser diodes". IEEE Journal of Quantum Electronics. 28 (10): 2203–2219. Bibcode:1992IJQE...28.2203D. doi:10.1109/3.159528. ISSN 1558-1713.
- Shi, H.; Finlay, J.; Alphonse, G.A.; Connolly, J.C.; Delfyett, P.J. (1997). "Multiwavelength 10-GHz picosecond pulse generation from a single-stripe semiconductor diode laser". IEEE Photonics Technology Letters. 9 (11): 1439–1441. Bibcode:1997IPTL....9.1439S. doi:10.1109/68.634701. ISSN 1941-0174. S2CID 40556512.
