= Demetrios Christodoulides =

American physicist

Demetrios N. Christodoulides is an American physicist known for his work in quantum optics and nonlinear optics and photonics. He is currently the Steven and Kathryn Sample Chair in Engineering, and Professor of Electrical and Computer Engineering at the University of Southern California.

== Career ==
Christodoulides received his PhD from Johns Hopkins University in 1986 and then joined BELLCORE as a postdoctoral research fellow. From 1988 to 2002 he worked in the Department of Electrical Engineering at Lehigh University. Between 2002 and 2022, Christodoulides worked at The College of Optics and Photonics at the University of Central Florida as a Pegasus Professor and the Cobb Family Endowed Chair. He moved to the University of Southern California in 2022 where he is the Steven and Kathryn Sample Chair in Engineering and a professor of Electrical and Computer Engineering.

Christodoulides has also served as an associate editor of the IEEE Journal of Quantum Electronics and JOSA B.

== Research ==
In 2007, Christodoulides and his collaborators studied the implications of parity–time non-Hermitian symmetry in optics. His group was the first to predict discrete self-trapped states in optical lattices and demonstrated optical accelerating beams. He has also worked on accelerating Airy waves and discrete solitons in periodic media.

== Honors and awards ==
- 1999 Fellow of Optica
- 2003 Fellow of the American Physical Society
- 2011 R. W. Wood Prize
- 2018 Max Born Award
- 2023 Arthur L. Schawlow Prize in Laser Science
