= University of Central Florida College of Optics and Photonics =

Coordinates: 28°36′04″N 81°11′50″W

College of Optics and Photonics
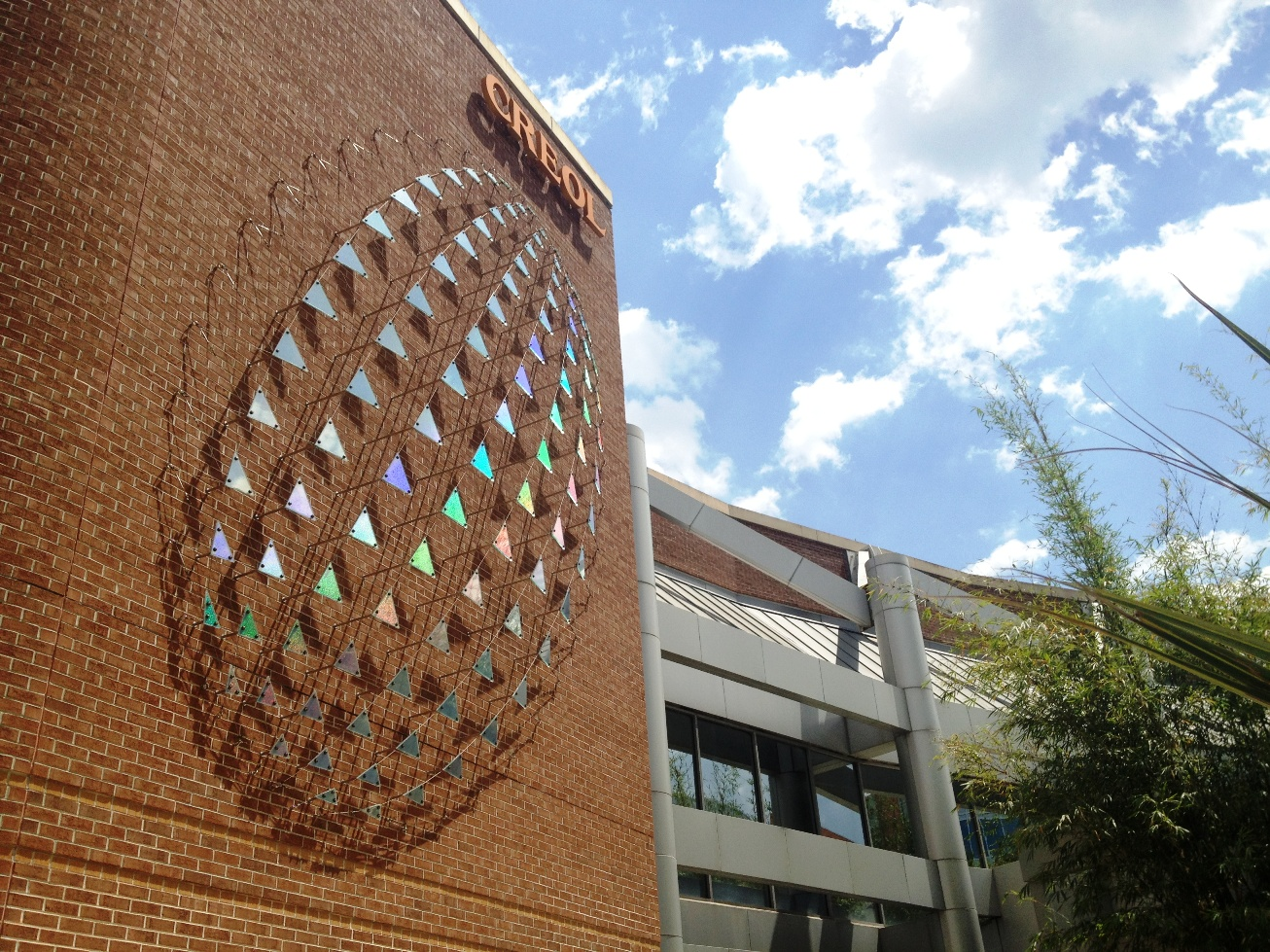
- Type: Public
- Established: 2004; 21 years ago
- Dean: David J. Hagan, Ph.D.
- Postgraduates: 119
- Location: Orlando, Florida, United States
- Website: Official Site

The University of Central Florida College of Optics and Photonics is an academic college of the University of Central Florida located in Orlando, Florida, United States. The dean of the college is David J. Hagan, Ph.D.

In 2004, UCF's board of trustees voted to give UCF's School of Optics and Photonics full college status, making it the first college dedicated specifically to optics and photonics at a public university in the United States. Until 2013, it was the only college at UCF that did not offer an undergraduate program, offering only Master's and Doctoral degrees in Optics. In March 2013, the Board of Trustees approved the Bachelor of Science in Photonic Science and Engineering. The college houses the Center for Research and Education in Optics and Lasers (CREOL), the Florida Photonics Center of Excellence (FPCE), and the Townes Laser Institute.

== Center for Research and Education in Optics and Lasers ==
The Center for Research and Education in Optics and Lasers (CREOL) is a research center within the College of Optics and Photonics (COP).

=== History ===
The idea for a research center dedicated to optics that would support the growth of Florida's high-tech industry began with the formation of the Florida High Technology and Industry Council (FHTIC) in the mid-1980s. In a FHTIC report, Ron Phillips of the Electrical Engineering Department at the University of Central Florida (UCF) recommended that the state take action to "form the Center for Research in Electro-Optics and Lasers (CREOL) to provide Florida's high-tech industries with access to research, students, and faculty in advanced areas of optical and laser sciences." Following the recommendation, the Florida legislature approved the use of $1.5M in permanent, recurring funds to UCF for the support of CREOL. In 1987, the Center for Research and Education in Optics and Lasers has been established.

MJ Soileau began work as the center's first director in January, 1987. He was joined by North Texas State University colleagues Eric Van Stryland and David Hagan. Van Stryland and Hagan would later serve as Dean and Associate Dean, respectively.

Timeline of Center for Research in Electro-Optics and Lasers (CREOL)
Year	Milestone
1986	The Center is founded
1994	CREOL building construction starts
early 1996	CREOL building ready for move-in
1999	School of Optics is established
2003	The Florida Photonics Center of Excellence is created
2004	The School of Optics becomes the College of Optics and Photonics
2013	Bachelor of Science in Photonic Science and Engineering is approved
2017	ABET accredits the Bachelor of Science in Photonic Science and Engineering
2021	ABET accredits the Bachelor of Science in Photonic Science and Engineering

=== Academics ===
Since its founding in 1986, CREOL has conferred a total of over 220 PhD and over 330 MS degree. The faculty have published 27 books and authored over 1900 journal articles which have been cited over 26,800 times. As of 2012, the college has 120 enrolled graduate students, 54 research scientists and postdoctoral fellows, and 51 joint, visiting, and full-time faculty. CREOL research activities cover all aspects of optics, photonics, and lasers.

On March 21, 2013, UCF's board of trustees voted to approve a Bachelor of Science in Photonic Science and Engineering. Until this time, the college only offered Masters and Doctoral Degrees. This program became possible after a collaborative effort between the College of Optics and Photonics and UCF's College of Engineering and Computer Science (CECS). Students who graduate with this degree are awarded a single degree from both COP and CECS and are therefore alumni of both colleges. While other colleges and universities offer tracks or engineering technology degrees, UCF is the only institution in the state of Florida to offer a photonics engineering bachelor's degree and one of only six in the nation.

=== Events ===
The College of Optics and Photonics hosts several events each year some of which are annual events, while others are those of special recognition.

Special Events:

- March 2012: CREOL marked its 25th anniversary with a celebration and technical symposium with over 330 attendees, including 3 Nobel Laureates: John Hall, Nicolaas Bloembergen, and Charles Townes.
- May 2012, 2014: CREOL is involved in the Science Olympiad National Tournament, hosted by the UCF that brings 7500 student participants and parents to the campus for the annual competition. UCF is the only site to host two tournaments in a three-year time span since the formation of Science Olympiad in 1984.

Annual Events:

- March: Industrial Affiliates Day - In cooperation with the CREOL Industrial Affiliates, partners and students are involved in a technical symposium and lab tours.
- April: CAOS, a student group in CREOL, hosts Optics Day which opens research labs and special demonstrations for the public and the campus.

== Florida Photonics Center of Excellence (FPCE) ==
Florida Photonics Center of Excellence
- Established: 2003
- Chairman: Dr. Eric Van Stryland
- Location: Orlando, Florida, United States

The Florida Photonics Center of Excellence (FPCE) is a research center within the based College of Optics and Photonics (COP).

The FPCE was established in 2003 with a $10 million grant from the State of Florida to create a new center of excellence within The College of Optics and Photonics. The focus of the FPCE research and education work is on the technologies of nanophotonics, biophotonics, advanced imaging and 3D displays, and ultra-high bandwidth communications, all of which have forecasts of rapid market growth. Work at the center has resulted in the creation of 31 jobs, and in the filing of 40 patents, of which 14 were issued. As well, the financial return on the $10 million state grant totals over $30 million.

== Townes Laser Institute ==
Townes Laser Institute
- Established: 2007
- Director: Martin Richardson
- Location: Orlando, Florida, United States
- Website: Official Site

The Townes Laser Institute was dedicated in 2007 in the presence of, and honoring Charles Townes, 1964 Nobel Laureate in Physics and the inventor of the concept of the laser. Associated with CREOL, the College of Optics and Photonics and the Florida Photonics Center of Excellence (FPCE) it is funded by the State of Florida to develop the next generation of laser light engines for applications in medicine, advanced manufacturing and defense applications. Some $4.5M was allocated in 2006 to the Townes Laser Institute for major facilities, and in addition, the President and Provost of UCF allocated five new faculty positions to support the Institute.
