= L. M. Narducci =

Italian-American physicist

Lorenzo M. Narducci (25 May 1942 – 21 July 2006) was an Italian-American physicist known for his contributions to quantum optics and the study of laser instabilities, in particular. He was the author of more than 200 scientific papers and several books including Laser Physics and Laser Instabilities. In addition to his research on the theory of laser instabilities he also contributed to the physics of emission and absorption in three-level systems, and frequency locking.

Narducci received his PhD from the University of Milan for research on optical coherence in quantum electrodynamics. He served as editor of Optics Communications (1987-2006) and was member of the editorial board at Physical Review A.

Narducci was a Fellow of the Optical Society and among various awards, he received the 1991 Einstein Prize for Laser Science and the 1999 Willis E. Lamb Award for Laser Science and Quantum Optics.
