= John L. Hall =

American physicist (born 1934)

John Lewis Hall
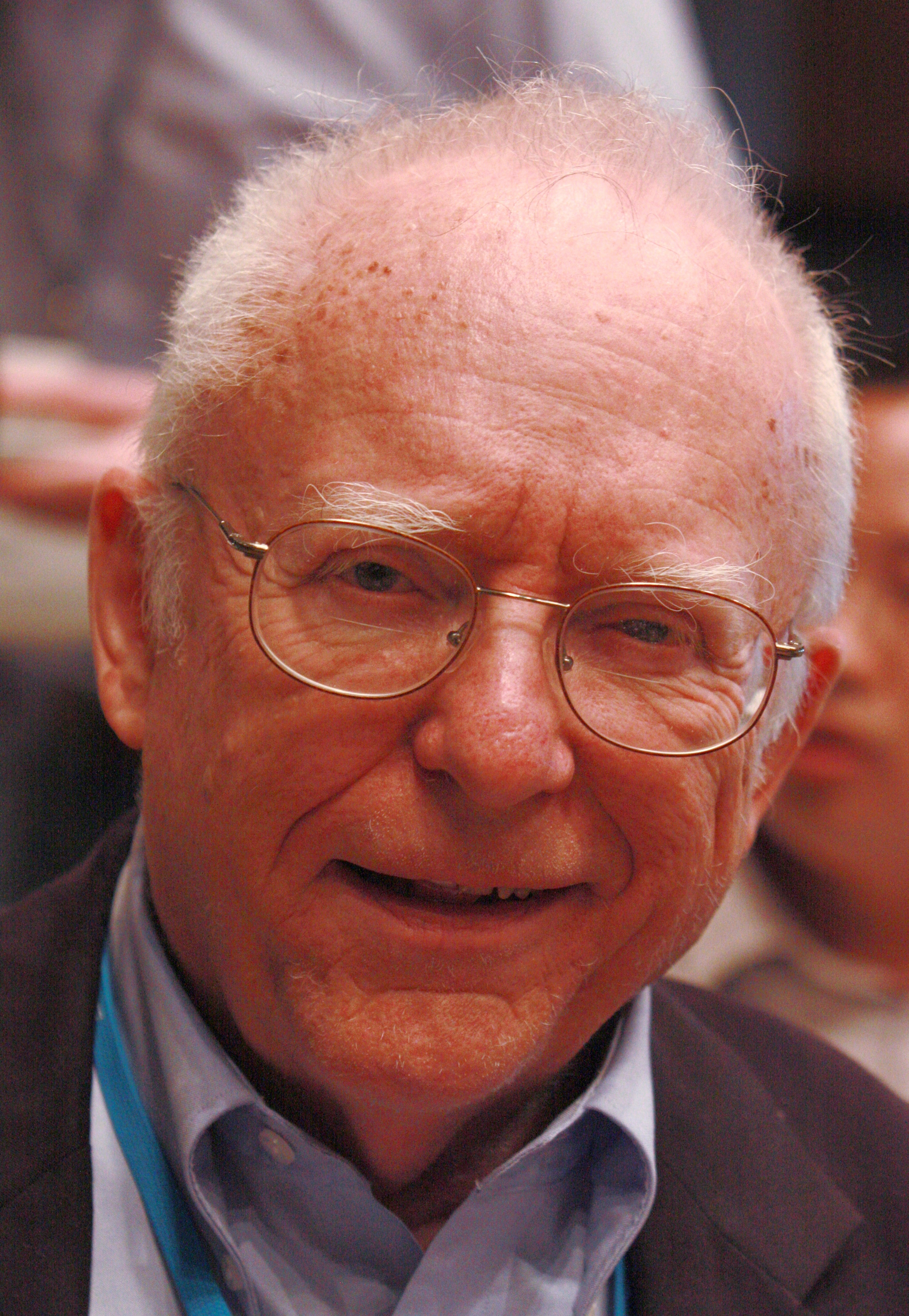
- Hall at the 2012 Lindau Nobel Laureate Meeting
- Born: August 21, 1934 (age 92); Denver, Colorado, U.S.
- Education: Carnegie Institute of Technology
- Known for: Optical frequency comb Optical clock Pound–Drever–Hall technique
- Scientific career
- Fields: Physics
- Workplaces: University of Colorado Boulder, JILA, NIST
- Thesis: Electron spin resonance of interstitial hydrogen atoms in calcium-fluoride (1962)
- Doctoral students: Jun Ye

John Lewis "Jan" Hall (born August 21, 1934) is an American physicist. He shared the 2005 Nobel Prize in Physics with Theodor W. Hänsch "for his contribution to the quantum theory of optical coherence." (Note: The 2005 Nobel Prize was also awarded jointly to Roy J. Glauber "for his contribution to the quantum theory of optical coherence.".)

== Biography ==
Born in Denver, Colorado, Hall holds three degrees from Carnegie Institute of Technology, a B.S. (1956), an M.S. (1958) and a Ph.D. (1961). He completed his postdoctoral studies at the Department of Commerce's National Bureau of Standards, now the National Institute of Standards and Technology (NIST), where he remained from 1962 until his retirement in 2004. He has lectured at the University of Colorado Boulder since 1967.

Hall is currently a NIST Senior Fellow, emeritus, and remains a Fellow at JILA, formerly the Joint Institute for Laboratory Astrophysics, and adjoint professor at the CU-Boulder Physics Department. JILA is a research institute managed jointly by CU-Boulder and NIST.

Hall shared half of the Nobel Prize with Theodor W. Hänsch for their pioneering work on laser-based precision spectroscopy and the optical frequency comb technique. The other half of the prize was awarded to Roy J. Glauber.

Hall has received many other honors for his pioneering work, including the Optical Society of America's Max Born Award "for pioneering the field of stable lasers, including their applications in fundamental physics and, most recently, in the stabilization of femtosecond lasers to provide dramatic advances in optical frequency metrology".

Hall is one of the 20 American recipients of the Nobel Prize in Physics to sign a letter addressed to President George W. Bush in May 2008, urging him to "reverse the damage done to basic science research in the Fiscal Year 2008 Omnibus Appropriations Bill" by requesting additional emergency funding for the Department of Energy’s Office of Science, the National Science Foundation, and the National Institute of Standards and Technology.

In 2015, Hall signed the Mainau Declaration 2015 on Climate Change on the final day of the 65th Lindau Nobel Laureate Meeting. The declaration was signed by a total of 76 Nobel Laureates and handed to then-President of the French Republic, François Hollande, as part of the successful COP21 climate summit in Paris.

In 2018 Hall donated his Nobel Prize medal to the University of Colorado Boulder.

== Honours and awards ==
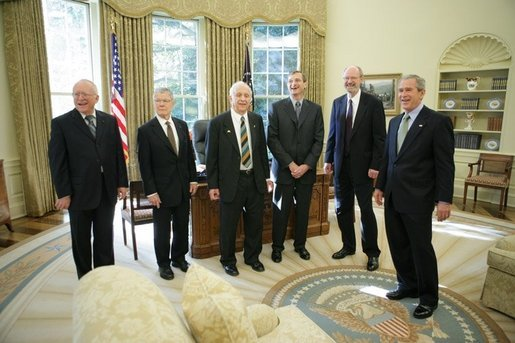
President George W. Bush meets with the 2005 Nobel Prize recipients. From left to right are Dr. John Hall, 2005 Nobel Prize in Physics; Dr. Thomas C. Schelling, 2005 Nobel Prize in Economic Sciences; Dr. Roy J. Glauber, 2005 Nobel Prize in Physics; Dr. Richard R. Schrock and Dr. Robert H. Grubbs, 2005 Nobel Prize winners in Chemistry.

- National Carbon Company Fellow in Physics, 1957–1961
- Department of Commerce Gold Medal, 1969
- Samuel W. Stratton Award, 1971
- Department of Commerce Gold Medal, 1974 (group awards)
- IR-100: Laser stabilizer selected as one of "100 best new products of the year," 1975
- IR-100: Laser wavelength meter ("Lambdameter") selected as one of "100 best new products of the year," 1977
- E. U. Condon Award, 1979
- Charles Hard Townes Award of the Optical Society of America, 1984, jointly with V. P. Chebotayev (Academy of Sciences, USSR)
- Davisson-Germer Prize of the American Physical Society, 1988
- Docteur Honoris Causa de l'Universite Paris Nord, 1989
- Frederic Ives Medal of the Optical Society of America, 1991
- Einstein Prize for Laser Science, 1992
- Arthur L. Shawlow Prize of the American Physical Society, 1993
- Allen V. Astin Measurement Science Award, 2000
- Max Born Award of the Optical Society of America, 2002
- Presidential Rank Award from the Office of Personnel Management, 2002
- Department of Commerce Gold Medal, 2002 (group awards)
- Rabi Award of the IEEE Ultrasonics, Ferroelectrics, and Frequency Control Society, 2004
- Légion d'Honneur Membership, 2004
- Nobel Prize in Physics, 2005
- Golden Plate Award of the American Academy of Achievement, 2006
- Doctor of Science, honoris causa, University of Glasgow, 2007
- Honorary Member of the Optical Society of America, 2007
