= Rublev (surname) =

Rublev (Russian: Рублёв, masculine, sometimes Rublyov; also Rublevsky, Рублёвский) or Rubleva (Рублёва; feminine, sometimes Rublyova) is a Russian surname.

Its roots may lie in the denotation either of the Russian unit of currency, ruble, or of an old type of washboard called rubels that might indicate the profession of an ancestor.

Notable people with this surname include:

- Andrei Rublev (14th–15th centuries), the greatest medieval Russian painter of Orthodox icons and frescoes
- Andrey Rublev (born 1997), Russian professional tennis player
- Ekaterina Rubleva (born 1985), Russian ice dancer
- Sergei Rublevsky (born 1974), Russian chess grandmaster
