= Lindau Nobel Laureate Meetings =

Annual scientific conference in Germany

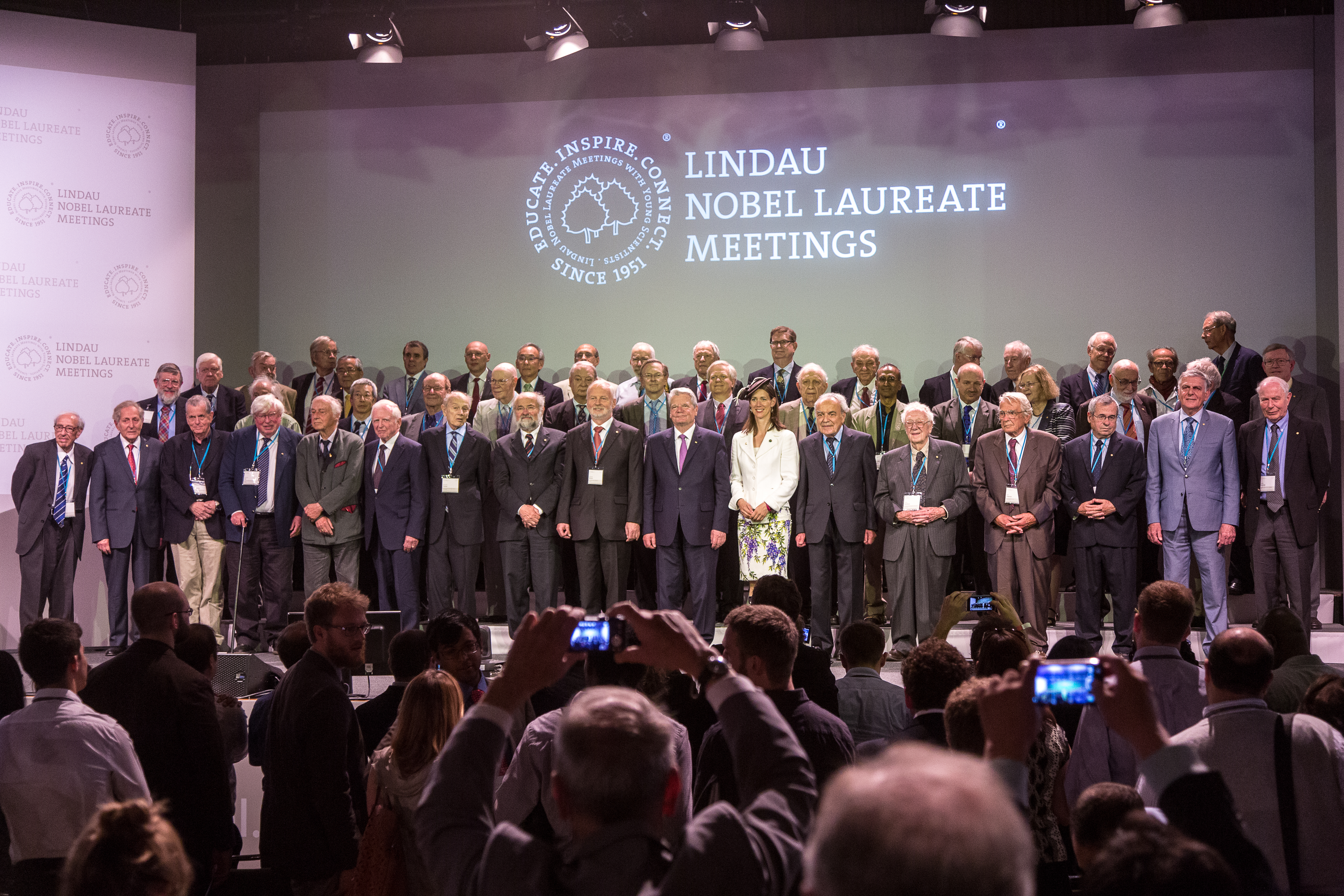
Group shot of the 65 Nobel Laureates who attended the 65th Lindau Nobel Laureate Meeting in summer of 2015 and German President Joachim Gauck as well as Countess Bettina Bernadotte, President of the Council for the Lindau Nobel Laureate Meetings

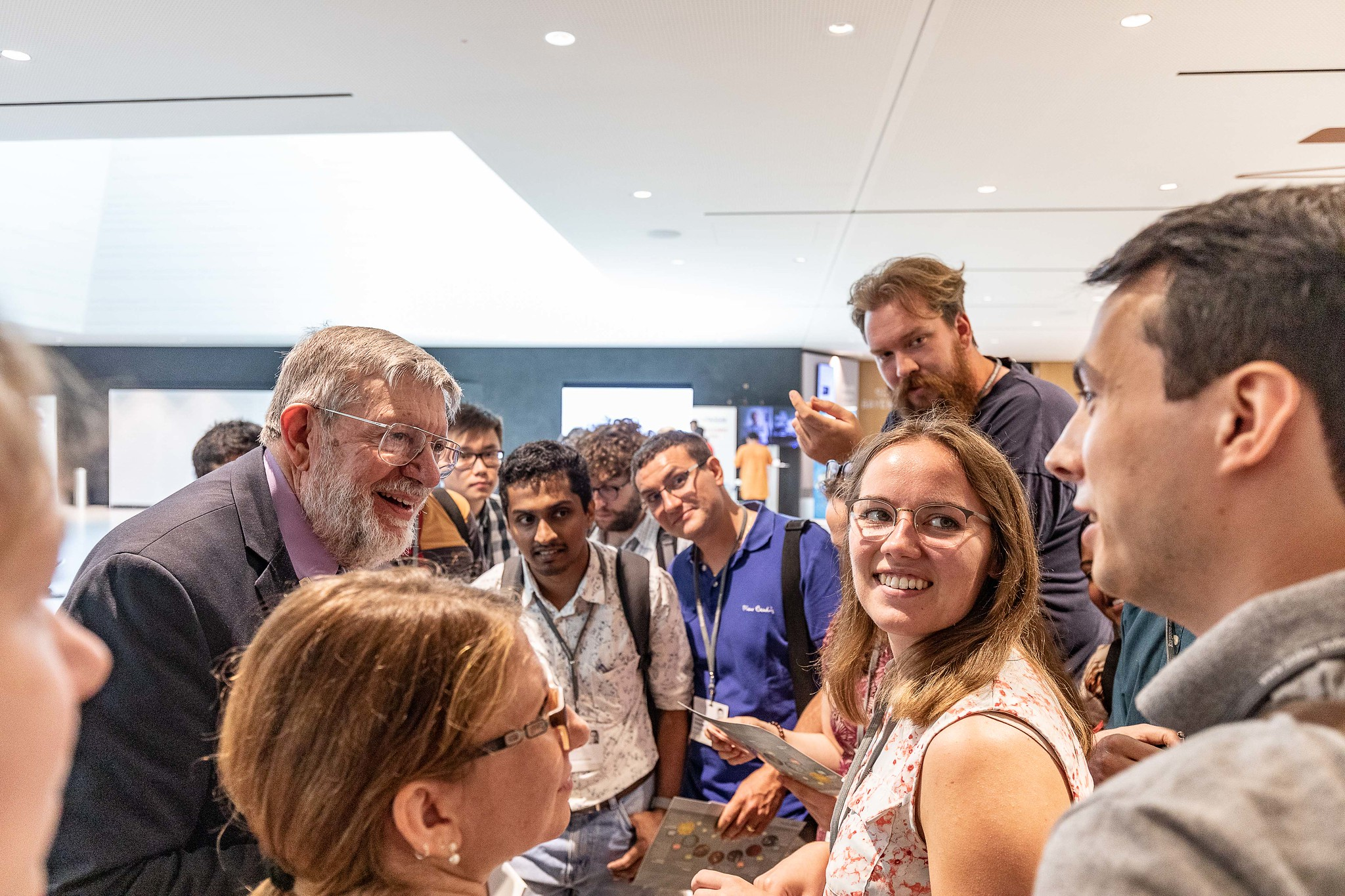
Nobel Laureate William D. Phillips discussing with young scientists during the 69th Lindau Meeting 2019. Foto: Ch. Flemming/Lindau Nobel Laureate Meetings

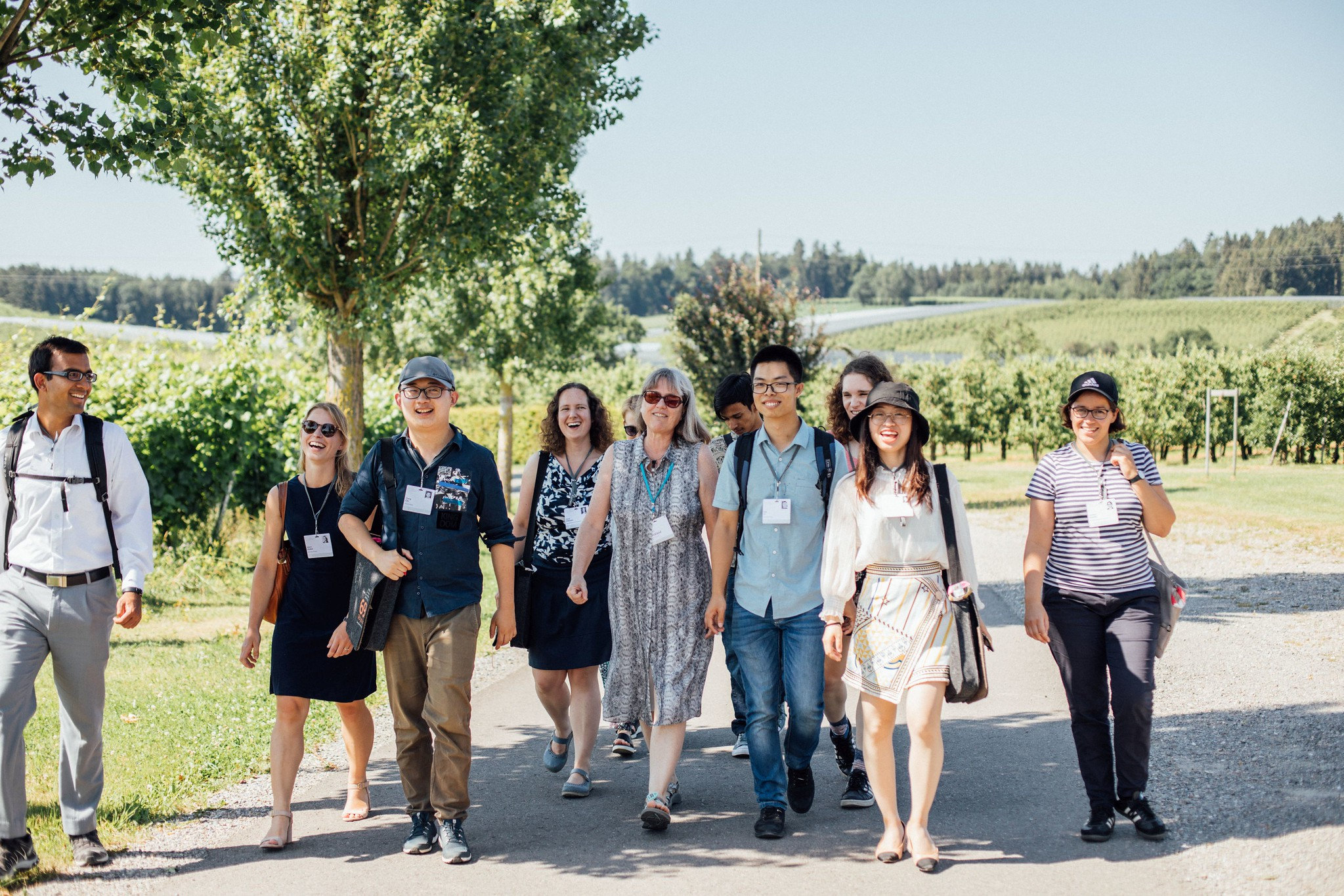
Nobel Laureate Donna Strickland during a Science Walk with young scientists at the 69th Lindau Meeting 2019. Foto: J. Nimke/Lindau Nobel Laureate Meetings

The Lindau Nobel Laureate Meetings are annual scientific conferences held in Lindau, Bavaria, Germany, since 1951. Their aim is to bring together Nobel laureates and the world's most talented young scientists to foster scientific exchange between different generations, cultures and disciplines. The meetings assume a unique position amongst international scientific conferences, as from 30 to more than 75 Nobel laureates attending each edition they are the largest regular congregation of Nobel laureates in the world, apart from the Nobel Prize award ceremony in Stockholm.

== Purpose ==
Every Lindau Meeting consists of a multitude of scientific sessions like lectures and panel discussions as well as a variety of networking and social events. The meetings are not centered on the presentation of research results, but instead, their main goals are the exchange of ideas and the discussion of topics globally relevant to all scientists. The Nobel laureates do not receive any kind of payment for their participation and are free to choose the topics of their presentations. Approximately 375 are members of the meetings’ Founders Assembly.

Billed by the organising Council for the Lindau Nobel Laureate Meetings as their ‘Mission Education’, the aim of the meetings is to facilitate the transfer of knowledge between Nobel laureates and young scientists but also among the international scientific community and the general public. The opportunity for participants to form international networks of scientists – e.g. through the Lindau Alumni Network – is also regarded as a prime objective by the organisers. The meetings' leitmotif is ‘Educate. Inspire. Connect.’

== History ==
After World War II, Germany was disconnected from the international scientific community due to the ramifications of the Nazi regime. During this time, hardly any scientific conferences of high value took place in Germany.

=== Initial idea and establishment (1951) ===
The two physicians Franz Karl Hein and Gustav Wilhelm Parade from Lindau, a small town located on the Bavarian shore of Lake Constance, conceived the idea of organising a scientific meeting to bring together German researchers and physicians with Nobel laureates. They convinced Count Lennart Bernadotte af Wisborg, a member of the Swedish royal family and proprietor of nearby Mainau Island, to call upon his good connections to Sweden's Nobel Committee and Nobel institutions to support the undertaking. The first meeting, subsequently held in 1951, was dedicated to the fields of medicine and physiology and was attended by seven Nobel laureates, among them Adolf Butenandt, Henrik Dam and Hans von Euler-Chelpin. After the success of the initial meeting, the scientific scope was broadened to include the other two natural science Nobel Prize disciplines chemistry and physics. Thus, a mode of annually alternating disciplines for the meetings was established.

Nobel laureate Werner Heisenberg surrounded by students at the 5th Lindau Nobel Laureate Meeting in 1955. Photo: Archive Spang/Lindau Nobel Laureate Meetings.

=== 1954–2000 ===
In 1954, the Council for the Lindau Nobel Laureate Meetings was founded and henceforth established as the organising committee of the meetings. Count Lennart was appointed as first president of the Council. Also in 1954, the concept of inviting students and young scientists to the meetings was introduced. This step was seen as a measure to add additional value for society to the meetings. Among the young scientists participating that year were also students from Eastern Germany.

While originally conceived by Hein and Parade as a European meeting of scientists, the Lindau Nobel Laureate Meetings slowly but steadily became more international. In the beginnings, only students from Lake Constance's bordering countries Germany, Switzerland, and Austria attended but year after year new nations began to send representatives. Since 2000, each Lindau Meeting is attended by young scientists from between 80 and 90 or even up 100 countries.

In 1987, Count Bernadotte resigned from his position as president of the Council for reasons of age and his wife, Countess Sonja Bernadotte af Wisborg, took over.

=== 2000–2008 ===
Shortly before the turn of the millennium, the future of the Lindau Nobel Laureate Meetings was again endangered due to financial uncertainties. In order to counter this negative development, Countess Sonja Bernadotte expanded the Council and added experts from charitable foundations and public affairs as well as representatives of Stockholm's Nobel Foundation to the committee.

Two main goals of Countess Sonja Bernadotte's aegis were the further internationalisation of the meetings and to improve its public images, both domestically and internationally.

On the occasion of the 50th Lindau Nobel Laureate Meeting in the year 2000, the establishment of the Foundation Lindau Nobel Laureate Meetings was officially announced. Its main goal since then has been to secure the funding of the Lindau Nobel Laureate Meetings. Upon its creation, 50 Nobel Laureates joined the Founders Assembly of the foundation and support the continuance of the conference both ideationally and financially.

The 50th Lindau Meeting in 2000 was also the first interdisciplinary meeting that united Nobel laureates and students from all three natural science disciplines (physics, chemistry, or physiology and medicine) of the Nobel Prize.

=== 2008–2019 ===
When Countess Sonja Bernadotte died in October 2008, her daughter, Countess Bettina Bernadotte, was elected President of the Council. She continued her mother's course and worked steadily to expand the international network of scientific partner institutions, complementing this with a strong commitment to education and an increase in the social value of the conferences.

=== Since 2020 ===
For the first time in its nearly 75-year history, the conference planned for 2020 had to be postponed to the following year due to the worldwide Corona pandemic. Instead, Nobel laureates, Lindau alumni, and young scientists came together online and exchanged ideas virtually at the Online Science Days 2020 and the Lindau Online Scienceathon 2020.

In the summer of 2022, the conferences on chemistry and economics were held in a hybrid format, with appropriate measures in place for on-site participants in the context of the COVID-19 pandemic.

The Lindau Alumni network has been systematically expanded over the past years through numerous offerings, which were primarily conducted online.

== Meetings ==
Ever since their inception, the Lindau Nobel Laureate Meetings have taken place in the small Bavarian town of Lindau on the shores of Lake Constance. The city's center is located on an island in the lake that is connected to the mainland via bridges.

=== Meeting cycle ===
The meetings focus alternately on physiology and medicine, physics, and chemistry – the three natural science Nobel Prize disciplines. Since 2000, an interdisciplinary meeting revolving around all three natural sciences is held every five years (last in 2021). In addition, since 2004 the Lindau Meeting on Economic Sciences is held every three years with recipients of the Sveriges Riksbank Prize in Economic Sciences in Memory of Alfred Nobel ("Economic Nobel Prize").

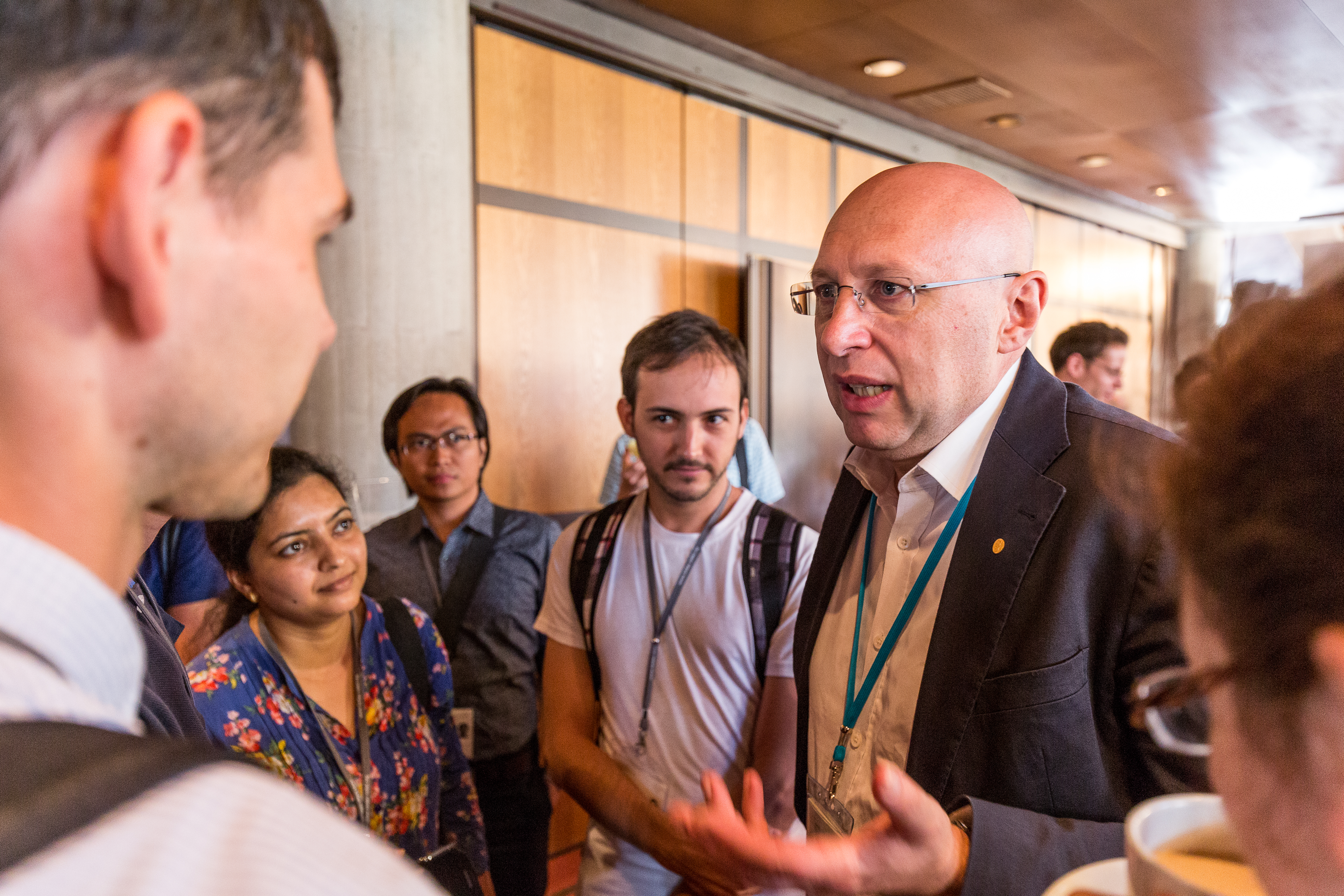
Nobel laureate Stefan Hell in discussion with young scientists. Photo: Ch. Flemming/Lindau Nobel Laureate Meetings.

=== Scientific programme ===
The following session types are currently part of the scientific programme of the Lindau Nobel Laureate Meetings:

- Lectures: Traditional presentations held by the Nobel laureates who are free to choose their topics.
- Agora Talks: The Agora Talks feature one or two Nobel laureates and a moderator, discussing a topic of the laureate’s choosing. Participants are given the opportunity to ask questions in an open forum setting. This format is especially suitable for controversial and new topics.
- Open Exchanges: Nobel laureates engage in intimate discussion sessions with the young scientists and answer their questions.
- Next Gen Science Sessions: In a review process, selected young scientists provide insights into their research in brief presentations.
- Panel Discussions: Several Nobel laureates and other meeting participants gather for a panel discussion and debate current issues in science. The audience has the opportunity to direct questions to the panelists.
- Science Breakfasts: Early-morning, panel discussions hosted by partner institutions and supporters of the meetings.

Apart from the abovementioned, there are also other formats such as Science Walks, Laureate Lunches and Life Lectures.

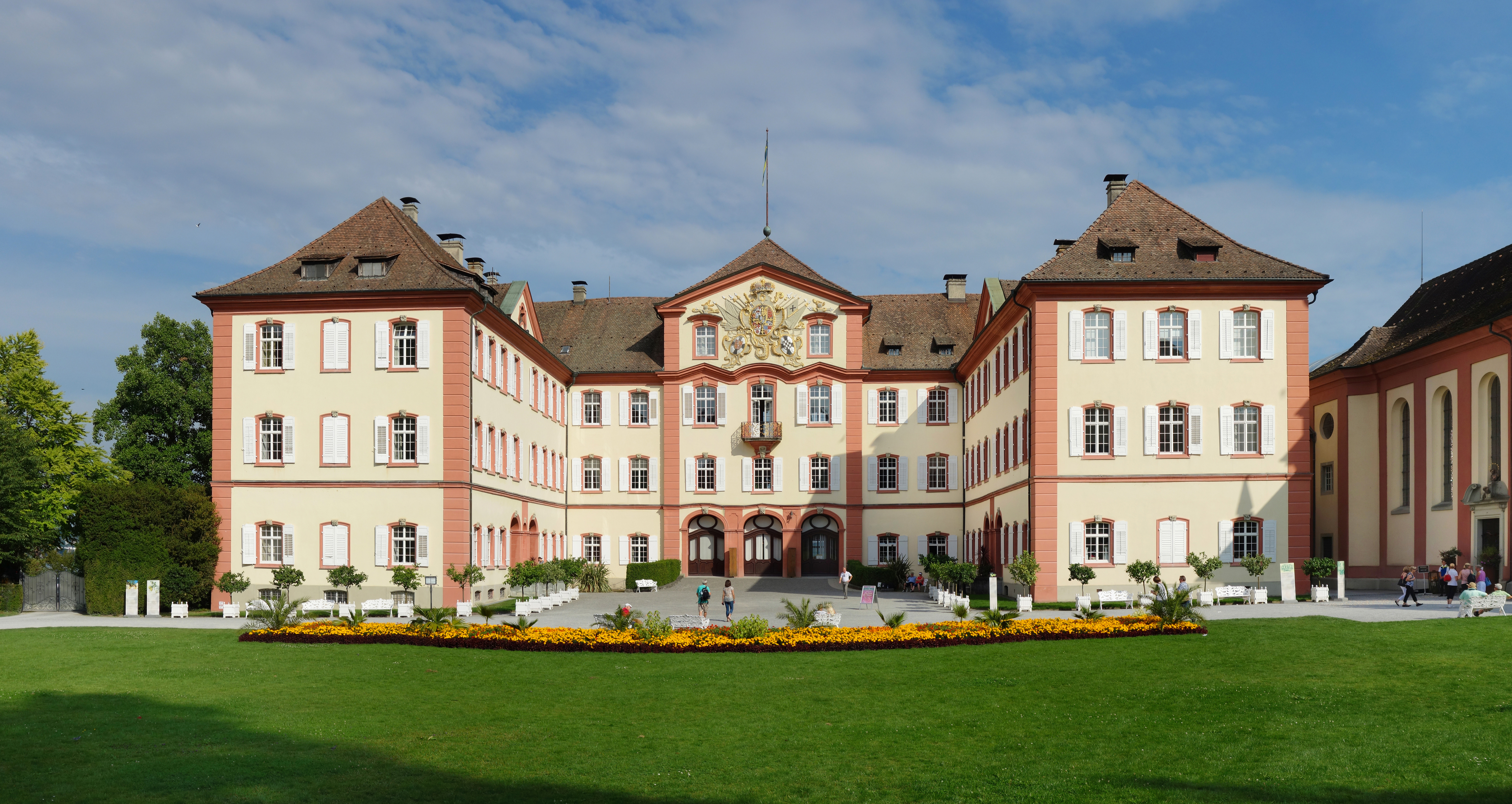
Mainau Castle on Mainau Island, property of the Bernadotte family and the traditional venue of the last day of every Lindau Nobel Laureate Meeting.

=== Social programme ===
The Lindau Nobel Laureate Meetings also host several events with social functions like dinners, BBQs and cultural events. Since 2010 one evening of each meeting is dedicated to an alternating partner country or region. The partner countries so far have been, among others:India (2009), the European Union (2010), the United States of America (2011), Singapore (2012), South Korea (2013), Australia (2014), France (2015), Austria (2016), Mexico (2017), China (2018) and South Africa (2019), the United Kingdom (2022), Indonesia (2023) and Texas (2024).

=== Boat trip to Mainau Island ===
The last day of each meeting includes both scientific and social programme features with a boat trip to Mainau Island at the invitation of the state of Baden-Württemberg. The visit to the island owned by the comital Bernadotte family of Mainau is designed both to let the meetings culminate in a final panel discussion on a topic combining science and society and to give the young scientists the opportunity to visit Mainau, the ‘flower island’.

== Participants ==
Meetings dedicated to a single discipline are usually attended by about 30 to more than 75 Nobel laureates and 500–600 exceptionally talented young scientists representing around more than 90 countries. In addition, several special guests of honour from politics, business and academia as well as international journalists attend the meetings.

=== Application process ===
Young scientists who want to participate need to pass a multi-stage application process. The application is open to undergraduates, PhD students and post-doc researchers who are at the top of their class and do not hold a permanent position yet. Young scientists can only participate once in a Lindau meeting.

=== Outstanding guests ===
Over the years many noteworthy guests of honour have visited the Lindau Nobel Laureate Meetings: Among them former German Presidents Roman Herzog, Johannes Rau, Horst Köhler and Christian Wulff. Former German President Joachim Gauck gave the opening address at the interdisciplinary meeting in 2015. German Chancellor Angela Merkel held the opening speech at the Lindau Meeting on Economic Sciences 2014 and 2017 it was the then president of the ECB Mario Draghi. Further notable guests include philanthropist and software entrepreneur Bill Gates, former President of the European Commission José Manuel Barroso and the President of Singapore Tony Tan.

== Organisation ==
The Lindau Nobel Laureate Meetings are made up of two legal bodies: The Council and the Foundation. While the council's responsibility is to put together the scientific programme and to organise the meetings via its executive secretariat, the foundation's task is to maintain the financial stability of the meetings and to ensure ongoing financial support.

=== Academic partners ===
Applications for meeting participation need to be addressed to the academic partners, who in turn nominate the best young scientists for the meetings.The council sustains a global network of academic partner institutions that range from national science academies, to universities, foundations and government ministries.

=== Funding ===
The Lindau meetings are funded by both public resources and private donations. The costs and funding of each meeting are made public in the annual report of the respective year. Private supporters are listed on the organisation's website and various other publications.

== Impact ==
Ever since their beginnings, the Lindau Nobel Laureate Meetings have aimed to facilitate an atmosphere in which scientists could assume more responsibility towards society. Therefore, several political appeals have been issued in Lindau over the years.

The impact these meetings have had on the careers of the roughly 35,000 young scientists, who have participated, is hard to quantify but profound – as one of the supporters put it: "You see the deep inspiration and motivation for the years to come in the eyes of the young researchers when they leave Lindau.”

=== Global networks ===
The meetings provide many networking opportunities for young scientists who in turn form global networks that often yield research collaborations or knowledge transfer not limited by borders or differing cultures. The Lindau Alumni Network as well as regular events for former participants help to connect the Lindau Community even after the meetings.

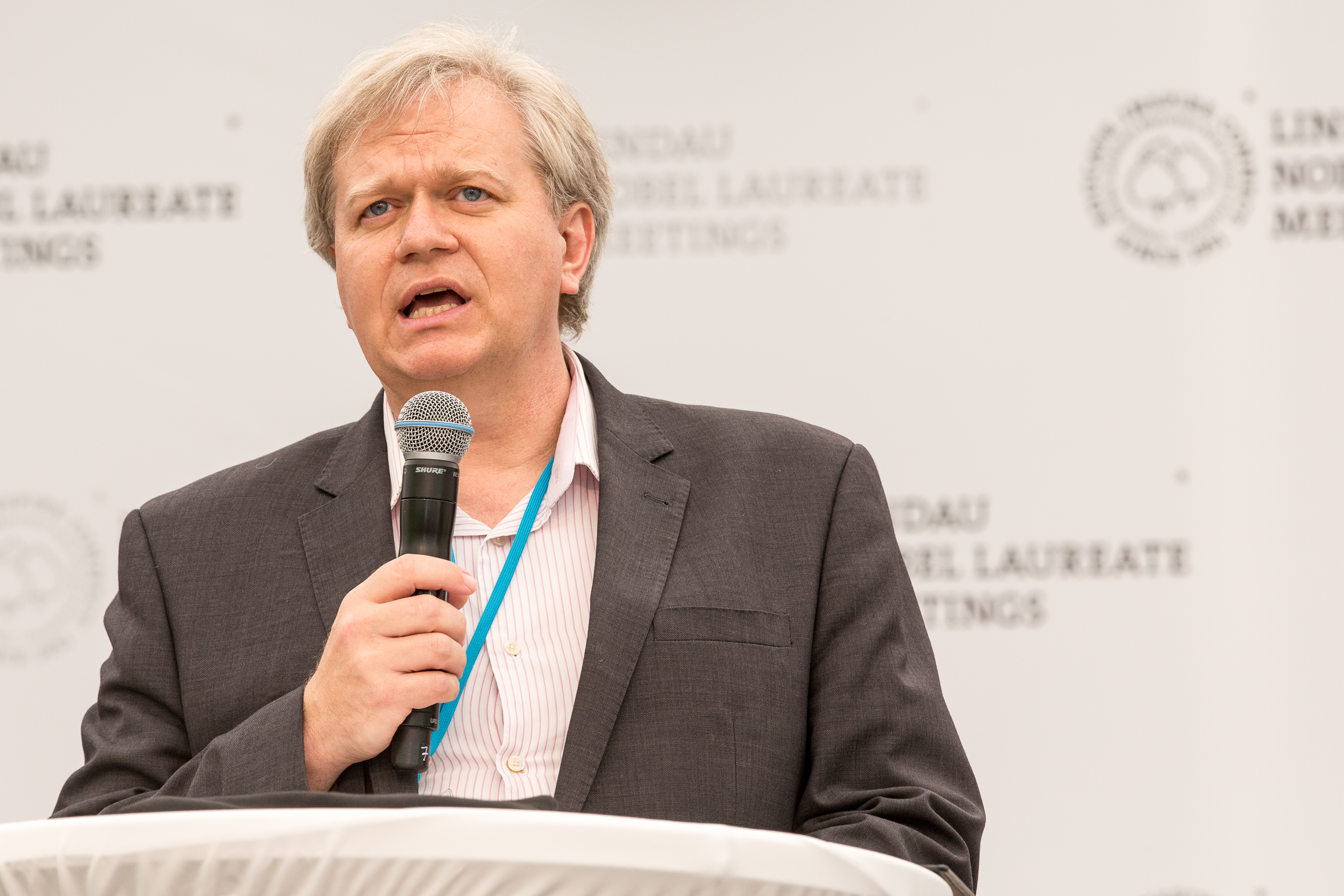
Nobel laureate Brian Schmidt reading the Mainau Declaration 2015 on Climate Change.

=== Mainau declarations ===
In 1955 at the 5th Lindau Nobel Laureate Meeting, German physics Nobel laureates Max Born and Otto Hahn initiated the ‘Mainau Declaration against the Use of Nuclear Weapons’ that was meant to urge world leaders to abstain from using nuclear weapons. It was initially signed by 18 Nobel laureates attending the meeting, but the number of signatories grew to 52 within a year.

Sixty years later, at the 65th Lindau Nobel Laureate Meeting in the summer of 2015, a second Mainau Declaration was issued, this time making a statement on the need to combat climate change. The declaration was initially signed by 36 attending Nobel laureates who were later joined by 40 additional colleagues.

The first "Mainau Declaration 2024 Against Nuclear Weapons" was taken up in the context of the "Mainau Declaration 2024" in 2024. At the conclusion of the 73rd At the Lindau Nobel Laureate Meeting, 30 Nobel laureates signed a declaration, read out by David J. Gross, warning of the dangers of nuclear war.

=== Lindau Guidelines ===
Nobel laureate Elizabeth Blackburn initiated the “Lindau Guidelines” in her opening speech during the 68th Lindau Nobel Laureate Meeting. The initiative formulates guidelines for global, sustainable and cooperative open science in the 21st century. The “Lindau Guidelines” currently comprise 10 goals, which are still openly discussed and are to be officially adopted and signed at the 70th Lindau Nobel Laureate Meeting in 2021.The Lindau Guidelines were signed by numerous Nobel laureates and other scientists.

=== Asian Science Camp ===
The Asian Science Camp, an annual forum for pre-collegiate and college students which aims at promoting discussion and cooperation among Asian students for the betterment of science in the Asian region, is modeled after the Lindau meetings. This idea of an annual camp was co-proposed by Yuan Tseh Lee and Masatoshi Koshiba at the 2005 Nobel Laureate Meetings at Lindau. With the exception of the COVID-19 pandemic, the forum has been meeting annually since 2007.

== Mediatheque ==
Due to the fact that the Lindau Meetings have such a long tradition and history, a digital and open to the public archive was established. It currently contains about 400 hours of video footage of lectures held by Nobel laureates during the Lindau meetings. In addition, photos, animated educational films and interactive content like virtual tours of Nobel laureates’ laboratories and an interactive map showing the career paths of the laureates are also available. The mediatheque is also used as an educational tool providing topic dossiers and introductions to certain scientific fields that can be used by teachers and professors.

== Other projects and outreach ==
The Lindau Nobel Laureate Meetings are also actively engaging in outreach projects and science communication based on their ‘Mission Education’ leitmotif. Among these projects are the photo exhibition ‘Sketches of Science’ by German photographer Volker Steger being exhibited world-wide and a permanent exhibition on the history of the meetings in Lindau's city museum.
