= Willis Lamb =

American physicist (1913–2008)

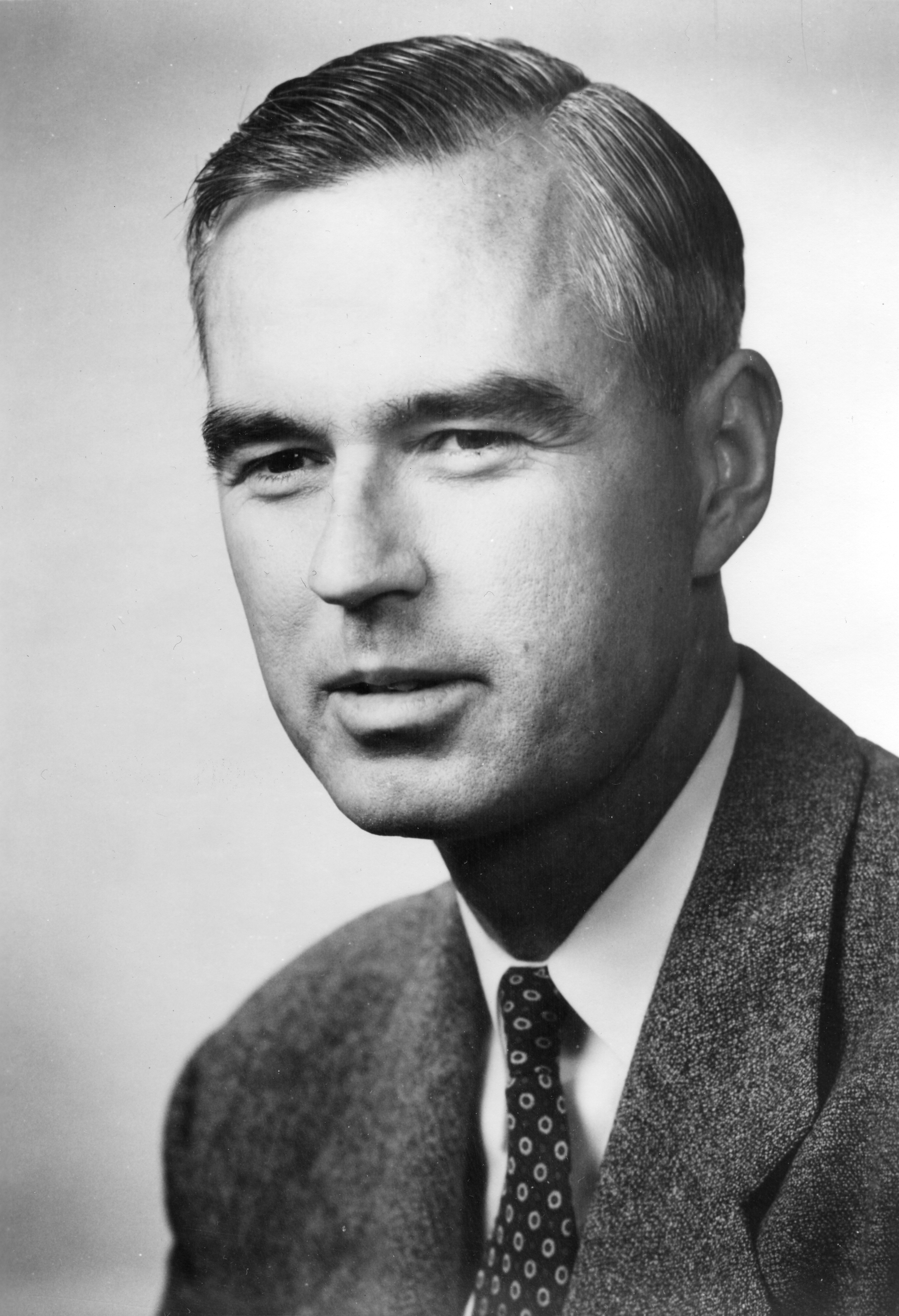
- Lamb in 1955
- Born: Willis Eugene Lamb Jr. July 12, 1913; Los Angeles, California, US
- Died: May 15, 2008 (aged 94); Tucson, Arizona, US
- Education: University of California, Berkeley (BS, PhD)
- Known for: Lamb–Mössbauer factor (1939); Lamb shift (1947)
- Title: Wykeham Professor of Physics (1956–1962)
- Predecessor: Maurice Pryce
- Successor: Rudolf Peierls
- Spouse: Ursula Schäfer (m. 1939; died 1996)
- Awards: Rumford Prize (1953); Nobel Prize in Physics (1955); Einstein Prize for Laser Science (1992); National Medal of Science (2000)
- Scientific career
- Fields: Atomic physics; Quantum physics
- Workplaces: Columbia University (1938–51); Stanford University (1951–56); Oxford University (1956–62); Yale University (from 1962)
- Thesis: I. On the Capture of Slow Neutrons in Hydrogenuous Substances, II. Electromagnetic Properties of Nuclear Systems (1938)
- Doctoral advisor: J. Robert Oppenheimer
- Doctoral students: Bernard T. Feld (1945); Norman Myles Kroll (1948); Theodore Maiman (1955); Balázs László Győrffy (1966); Marlan Scully (1966)

Willis Eugene Lamb Jr. (July 12, 1913 – May 15, 2008) was an American physicist who was able to precisely determine a surprising shift in electron energies in a hydrogen atom, known as the Lamb shift. For this work, Lamb shared the 1955 Nobel Prize in Physics with Polykarp Kusch. He was a professor at the University of Arizona College of Optical Sciences.

== Education and career ==
Willis Eugene Lamb Jr. was born on July 12, 1913 in Los Angeles, California, the son of Willis Eugene Lamb Sr., a telephone engineer, and Marie Helen Metcalf. First admitted in 1930, he obtained a B.S. in Chemistry from the University of California, Berkeley, in 1934. For theoretical work on scattering of neutrons by a crystal, guided by J. Robert Oppenheimer, Lamb received his Ph.D. in Physics in 1938. Because of limited computational methods available at the time, this research narrowly missed revealing the Mössbauer Effect, 19 years before its recognition by Rudolf Mössbauer. He worked on nuclear theory, laser physics, and verifying quantum mechanics.

In 1938, Lamb became Instructor in Physics at Columbia University, where he was promoted to Professor of Physics in 1948. In 1951, he was appointed Professor of Physics at Stanford University. From 1956 to 1962, he was Wykeham Professor of Physics at the University of Oxford, where he was also a Fellow of New College. In 1962, he was appointed Henry Ford II Professor of Physics at Yale University. In 1974, he became Professor of Physics and Optical Science at the University of Arizona, where he remained until his retirement in 2003.

== Quantum physics ==
In addition to his crucial and famous contribution to quantum electrodynamics via the Lamb shift, in the latter part of his career he paid increasing attention to the field of quantum measurements. In one of his writings Lamb stated that "most people who use quantum mechanics have little need to know much about the interpretation of the subject." Lamb was also openly critical of many of the interpretational trends on quantum mechanics and of the use of the term photon.

== Personal life and death ==
In 1939, Lamb married Ursula Schäfer (1914–1996), a German student who became a distinguished historian of Latin America (and assumed his last name).

Lamb died on May 15, 2008, at the age of 94, due to complications of a gallstone disorder.

Lamb is remembered as a "rare theorist turned experimentalist" by D. Kaiser.

== Recognition ==
=== Awards ===
Year	Organization	Award	Citation	Ref.
1953	(United States) American Academy of Arts and Sciences	Rumford Prize (Note: Shared with Enrico Fermi and Lars Onsager.)	"For his studies of the atomic hydrogen spectrum."	
1955	(Sweden) Royal Swedish Academy of Sciences	Nobel Prize in Physics (Note: Shared with Polykarp Kusch.)	"For his discoveries concerning the fine structure of the hydrogen spectrum."	

=== Memberships ===
Year	Organization	Type	Ref.
1954	(United States) National Academy of Sciences	Member	
1963	(United States) American Academy of Arts and Sciences	Member	
2000	(United States) Optical Society of America	Honorary Member	

=== National awards ===
Year	Head of state	Award	Citation	Ref.
2000	(United States) Bill Clinton	National Medal of Science	"For his towering contributions to classical and quantum theories of laser radiation and quantum optics, and to the proper interpretation of quantum mechanics."	
