= Marlan Scully =

American physicist (born 1939)

Marlan O. Scully
- Born: August 3, 1939 (age 87); Casper, Wyoming, U.S.
- Education: Rensselaer Polytechnic Institute; Casper College; University of Wyoming; Yale University
- Known for: Quantum optics Laser physics
- Awards: Adolph E. Lomb Medal (1970); Elliott Cresson Medal (1990); Charles Hard Townes Award (1998); Quantum Electronics Award (2003); Arthur L. Schawlow Prize (2005); Herbert Walther Award (2011); Frederic Ives Medal (2012)
- Scientific career
- Fields: Physics
- Workplaces: Baylor University; Texas A&M University; Princeton University; Yale University; MIT; University of Arizona; University of New Mexico; Max Planck Inst. of Quantum Optics
- Thesis: Quantum theory of an optical maser (1967)
- Doctoral advisor: Willis Lamb
- Doctoral students: Julio Gea-Banacloche; Patrick A. Lee; Mikhail Lukin; Wolfgang P. Schleich; Eric Van Stryland

Marlan Orvil Scully (born August 3, 1939) is an American physicist best known for his work in theoretical quantum optics. He is a professor at Texas A&M University and Princeton University. Additionally, in 2012 he developed a lab at the Baylor Research and Innovation Collaborative in Waco, Texas.

He has authored over 700 scientific articles, as well as standard textbooks such as Laser Physics (with W. Lamb and M. Sargent) and “Quantum Optics” (with M. S. Zubairy).

== Education ==
Scully was born in Casper, Wyoming, where he attended public schools including Casper College, and finished his undergraduate studies at the University of Wyoming and Rensselaer Polytechnic Institute. He received his PhD under the guidance of Willis Lamb at Yale University in 1965.

== Career ==
After completing his graduate work at Yale University, Scully became an instructor at Yale and then proceeded to become an assistant professor at MIT, where he received early promotion to associate professor and moved to the University of Arizona to become professor before age 30. While there, he worked with Willis Lamb, Peter Franken, and others to build the Optical Sciences Center there. In 1980, he took a joint position between the Max Planck Institute für Quantenoptik and the University of New Mexico as distinguished professor. In 1992, he moved to Texas A&M, where he is now Burgess Distinguished Professor of Physics, holds the TEES Distinguished Research chair, and is director of the Center for Theoretical Physics and the Institute for Quantum Studies. In 2003, he was appointed visiting professor at Princeton University. In 2005, he accepted a joint professional appointment between Texas A&M and Princeton Universities.

The Scully-Lamb quantum theory of the laser was the first theoretical treatment which yielded the laser photon statistics, the laser linewidth, and all higher order photon correlations. It was later extended to explain behavior of the single photon maser. Most recently, Scully and coworkers have shown that the laser master equation analysis also provides a good quantitative description of fluctuations in the Bose–Einstein condensate.

The foundation of quantum mechanics is another area which Scully has made pioneering contributions. Aharonov and Zubairy in their 2005 Science article on "Time and the Quantum" describe one facet of his work as follows:

"The quantum eraser effect of Scully and Drühl dramatically underscores the difference between our classical conceptions of time and how quantum processes can unfold in time. Such eyebrow-raising features of time in quantum mechanics have been.. . described ‘as one of the most intriguing effects in quantum mechanics’.. . The quantum eraser concept has been studied and extended in many different experiments and scenarios, for example, the entanglement quantum eraser, the kaon quantum eraser, and the use of quantum eraser entanglement to improve microscopic resolution."

A rather unorthodox feature of his career is his strong combination of theoretical and experimental science. For example, Scully and colleagues were the first to make lasers oscillate without population inversion and have extended the coherent Raman spectroscopy techniques to detect anthrax type endospores. In addition, Scully is long time cattle rancher known for his research in the United States and abroad, e.g., Mongolia, into beef cattle production. This unlikely combination of activities and interests has resulted in his being dubbed the "quantum cowboy." In addition to his seven US Patents in laser physics, he holds a US Patent (5,198,222) titled "Time Release Bolus," which is a device for slowly delivering medicine or nutrients into the stomach of a cow.

== Recognition ==
Scully is a member of the National Academy of Sciences, the American Academy of Arts & Sciences, the Academia Europaea, and the Max Planck Society, and he is a Fellow of OSA. He has also received numerous awards including the Adolph E. Lomb Medal of the OSA in 1970, the Elliott Cresson Medal of the Franklin Institute in 1990, the Charles Hard Townes Award of the OSA in 1998, the Quantum Electronics Award of IEEE in 2003, a Guggenheim Fellowship, the Alexander von Humboldt Distinguished Faculty Prize, the APS Arthur L. Schawlow Prize in 2005, and has been appointed to a Harvard Loeb Lectureship. In 2011, Scully was honored with the Herbert Walther Award and in 2012 with the Frederic Ives Medal of the OSA. In December 2016, he has been elected as a Foreign Member Of Russian Academy of Sciences. In 2021, he was elected as a foreign member of the Chinese Academy of Sciences with a Chinese name 司嘉理 (pinyin: Sī Jiālǐ).

== Life ==
His wife Judith Bailey Scully and he have three sons: James, an American Airline captain; Robert, a writer and Caterpillar diesel mechanic; and Steven, an electrical engineer with Dallas Semiconductor. Rob (with an introduction by his father) wrote a book entitled The Demon and the Quantum: From the Pythagorean Mystics to Maxwell's Demon and Quantum Mystery which was published by Wiley-VCH in October 2007. The book is directed toward the layperson as well as the professional physicist and examines the connection between Maxwell's demon and the role of the observer and quantum eraser. Marlan is a Christian.

== Bibliography ==
=== Articles ===
- Berthold-Georg Englert, Marlan O. Scully and Herbert Walther (December 1994). "The Duality in Matter and Light". Scientific American. 271 (6): 56–61. Bibcode:1994SciAm.271f..86E. doi:10.1038/scientificamerican1294-86.
