= Herbert Walther =

German physicist

Herbert Walther (January 19, 1935 in Ludwigshafen, Germany – July 22, 2006 in Munich) was a leader in the fields of quantum optics and laser physics. He was a founding director of the Max Planck Institute of Quantum Optics (MPQ) in Garching, Germany. He also was Chair of Physics at LMU Munich. He is primarily known for his experimental work on cavity quantum electrodynamics (in the form of the micromaser) as well his groundbreaking work on the ion trap.

At the time of his death he had over 600 publications and numerous awards from a number of prestigious physics and optics societies. In 1978, he won the Max Born Medal and Prize. In 1988, he received the Einstein Prize for Laser Science, in 1990, he received the Charles Hard Townes Award, in 1993 the Albert A. Michelson Medal from the Franklin Institute in Philadelphia and in 2003 the Frederic Ives Medal of The Optical Society.

== Bibliography ==
=== Articles ===
- Berthold-Georg Englert, Marlan O. Scully and Herbert Walther (December 1994). "The Duality in Matter and Light". Scientific American. 271 (6): 56–61. Bibcode:1994SciAm.271f..86E. doi:10.1038/scientificamerican1294-86.
