= 1901 Nobel Prize in Physics =

- Wilhelm Conrad Röntgen
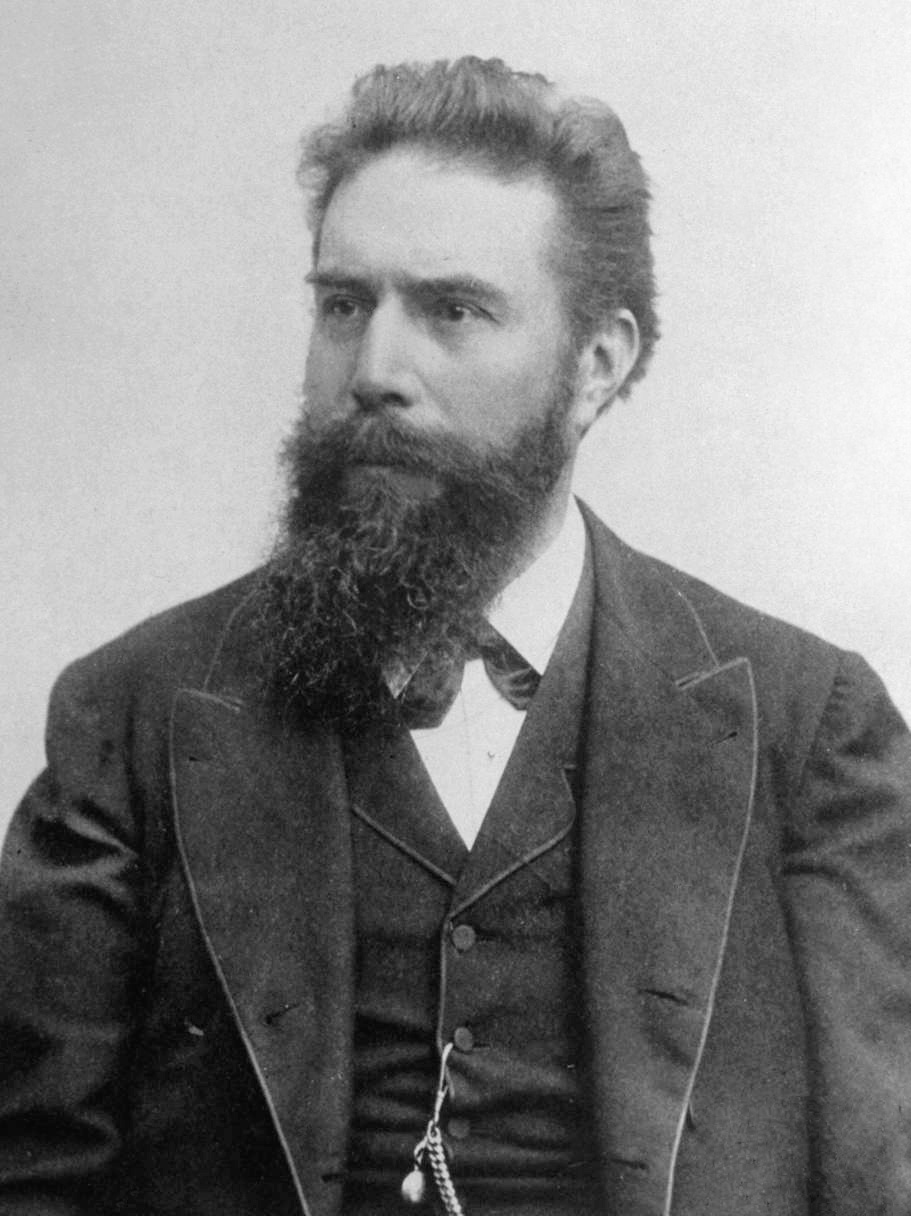
- "in recognition of the extraordinary services he has rendered by the discovery of the remarkable rays subsequently named after him."
- Sponsored by: Nobel Foundation
- Date: 10 December 1901
- Location: Royal Swedish Academy of Music, Stockholm, Sweden–Norway
- Presented by: Royal Swedish Academy of Sciences
- Hosted by: C. T. Odhner
- Reward: 150,782 kronor (10,769,099 kr. in 2023)
- Website: Official website

The 1901 Nobel Prize in Physics was presented in a ceremony in Stockholm, Sweden to the German Wilhelm Conrad Röntgen, "in recognition of the extraordinary services he has rendered by the discovery of the remarkable rays subsequently named after him", namely, X-rays. It was the first of its kind resulting from the will of the Swedish chemist Alfred Nobel in 1895 to recognize "the person who made the most important discovery or invention in the field of physics".

== Laureate ==
Wilhelm Röntgen (1845–1923) was a German physicist at the Ludwig-Maximilians-Universität München (LMU) and a member of the Royal Swedish Academy of Sciences when he received the Nobel Prize. Whilst he was at the University of Würzburg and experimenting with cathode ray tubes, Röntgen discovered on 8 November 1895 that some waves could penetrate objects and record their transparent likenesses on photographic plates. Röntgen announced his discoveries, which he named X-rays, in a brief note to the Physico-medical Society of Würzburg entitled Eine neue Art von Strahlen ("On a New Kind of Rays"). It immediately attracted enormous popular and scientific attention worldwide, with over one thousand books, pamphlets and articles appearing on the phenomenon, which Rudolph Albert von Kölliker dubbed "Röntgen rays", in just the year 1896.

Deliberately left unpatented by Röntgen, by 1901, X-rays were seeing widespread use in hospitals, inspired further research into radiation, including among many future Nobel laureates, and made its discoverer into a celebrity. For instance, in 1900 alone, Röntgen received the Barnard Medal from Columbia University, and was made Knight of the Order of Merit of the Bavarian Crown and Prussian Order of the Crown 2nd Class. X-rays are still known in some languages as Röntgen rays, and images produced with them as roentgenograms.

== Deliberations ==
The Nobel Prize in Physics is awarded by an absolute majority vote of the Royal Swedish Academy of Sciences from among the persons given valid nominations by scientists and/or Academy members qualified to do so. The Academy held a plenary session on 12 November, with the secretary being Swedish chemist Wilhelm Palmær. There is no record of either proceedings or individual votes to comply with standards on secrecy.

Within the Academy, there is a specialist Nobel Committee for Physics, usually composed of Swedes, who issue their own proposals and judgement. The Committee's membership in 1901 follows:

No.	Member	Image	Date appointed	Affiliation
1	Knut Ångström		1900	Uppsala University
2	Svante Arrhenius		1900	Stockholm University
3	Bernhard Hasselberg		1900	Royal Swedish Academy of Sciences
4	Hugo Hildebrandsson		1900	Uppsala University
5	Robert Thalén		1900	Uppsala University

=== Nominations ===
Röntgen was nominated by sixteen of the 29 nominators. Members of the Academy are denoted with an asterisk (*) in the table below. The five members of the Committee all divided their nominations between Röntgen and fellow German Philipp Lenard, who received the second-most number of nominations, i.e., six. Members of that Committee are denoted with a dagger (†). Röntgen himself voted for Lord Kelvin. Nominations must have been received before 1 February 1901. As was the case until 1910, the identity of the winners was not revealed until the prize ceremony the following month.

Note that two of the nominees died between 1 February and the plenary session: Henry Augustus Rowland, on 16 April 1901, and Adolf Erik Nordenskiöld, on 12 August; therefore, they would be disqualified for a Nobel Prize, whose recipient must be living. Additionally, at least two nominations (including Rowland's) were disallowed because they were self-nominations.

No.	Nominee	Affiliation	Nominator(s)
1	Svante Arrhenius; (1859–1927)	Sweden	Adolf von Baeyer (1835–1917) *; August Sundell (1843–1924)
2	Henri Becquerel; (1852–1908)	France	Marcellin Berthelot (1827–1907) *
3	William W. Campbell; (1862–1938)	United States	George Hale (1868–1938); Simon Newcomb (1835–1909) *
4	Philipp E. A. v. Lenard; (1862–1947)	Germany	Knut Ångström (1857–1910) (Note: Jointly between Philipp Lenard and Wilhelm Röntgen.) †; Svante Arrhenius (1859–1927) †; Bernhard Hasselberg (1848–1922) †; Hugo Hildebrandsson (1838–1925) †; Robert Thalén (1827–1905) †; Silvanus P. Thompson (1851–1916) *
5	Gabriel Lippmann; (1845–1921)	France	Joseph de Lacaze-Duthiers (1821–1901) *
6	Guglielmo Marconi; (1874–1937)	United Kingdom	Pietro Blaserna (1836–1918)
7	~~Adolf Nordenskiöld~~; ~~(1832–1901)~~ (Note: Nominee died before announcement.)	~~Sweden~~	~~Elis Sidenbladh (1836–1914) *~~
8	Wilhelm Röntgen; (1845–1923)	Germany	Knut Ångström (1857–1910) †; Svante Arrhenius (1859–1927) †; Wilhelm von Bezold (1837–1907); Anton Dohrn (1840–1909) *; Bernhard Hasselberg (1848–1922) †; Friedrich von Hefner-Alteneck (1845–1904) *; Hugo Hildebrandsson (1838–1925) †; Rudolph A. von Kölliker (1817–1905) *; Max von Pettenkofer (1818–1901) *; Max Planck (1858–1947); Friedrich von Recklinghausen (1833–1910) *; Franz Reuleaux (1829–1905); Both the Nobel Foundation and Crawford's book list an "E. Stuve" without additional identifying information.; Robert Thalén (1827–1905) †; Emil Warburg (1846–1931); Gustav Zeuner (1828–1907) *
9	William Thompson, Lord Kelvin; (1824–1907)	United Kingdom	Wilhelm Röntgen (1845–1923) *
10	Johannes van der Waals; (1837–1923)	Netherlands	Heike Kamerlingh Onnes (1853–1926)
11	Pieter Zeeman; (1865–1943)	Netherlands	Christian Christiansen (1843–1917); Albert Michelson (1852–1931)
—	~~Henry Augustus Rowland~~; ~~(1832–1901)~~ (Note: Disallowed self-nomination.)	~~United States~~	~~Henry Augustus Rowland (1832–1901) *~~
—	~~Robert Henry Thurston~~; ~~(1839–1903)~~	~~United States~~	~~Robert Henry Thurston (1839–1903) *~~

== Ceremony ==
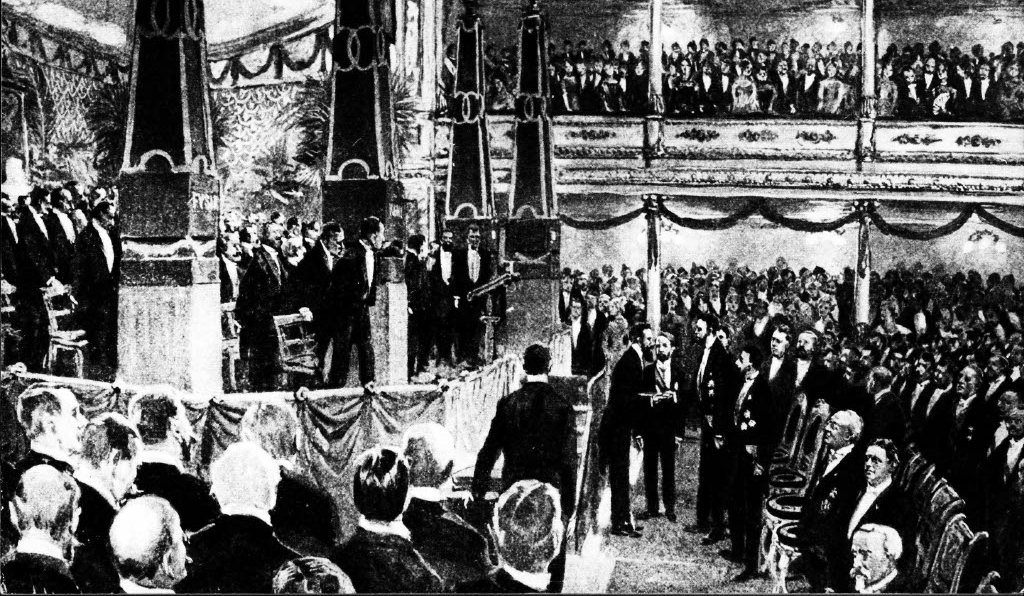
Röntgen receiving the Nobel Prize.

The Nobel Prize ceremonies began at 7 p.m. on Tuesday, 10 December 1901, the fifth anniversary of Nobel's death. As until 1926, the scientific Prizes were presented in the hall of the Royal Swedish Academy of Music in Nybroviken, Stockholm, Sweden.

The presentation speeches for the Prizes in Physics and Chemistry were delivered by Clas Theodor Odhner, President of the Royal Swedish Academy of Sciences, and former Rector of the National Archives of Sweden. Odhner began with Physics, describing its laureate thusly:

The Academy awarded the Nobel Prize in Physics to Wilhelm Conrad Röntgen, Professor in the University of Munich (Ludwig-Maximilians-Universität München), for the discovery with which his name is linked for all time: the discovery of the so-called Röntgen rays or, as he himself called them, X-rays. These are, as we know, a new form of energy and have received the name “rays” on account of their property of propagating themselves in straight lines as light does. The actual constitution of this radiation of energy is still unknown. Several of its characteristic properties have, however, been discovered first by Röntgen himself and then by other physicists who have directed their researches into this field. And there is no doubt that much success will be gained in physical science when this strange energy form is sufficiently investigated and its wide field thoroughly explored. Let us remind ourselves of but one of the properties which have been found in Röntgen rays; that which is the basis of the extensive use of X-rays in medical practice. Many bodies, just as they allow light to pass through them in varying degrees, behave likewise with X-rays, but with the difference that some which are totally impenetrable to light can easily be penetrated by X-rays, while other bodies stop them completely. Thus, for example, metals are impenetrable to them; wood, leather, cardboard and other materials are penetrable and this is also the case with the muscular tissues of animal organisms. Now, when a foreign body impenetrable to X-rays, e.g. a bullet or a needle, has entered these tissues its location can be determined by illuminating the appropriate part of the body with X-rays and taking a shadowgraph of it on a photographic plate, whereupon the impenetrable body is immediately detected. The importance of this for practical surgery, and how many operations have been made possible and facilitated by it is well known to all. If we add that in many cases severe skin diseases, e.g. lupus, have been successfully treated with Röntgen rays, we can say at once that Röntgen’s discovery has already brought so much benefit to mankind that to reward it with the Nobel Prize fulfils the intention of the testator to a very high degree.

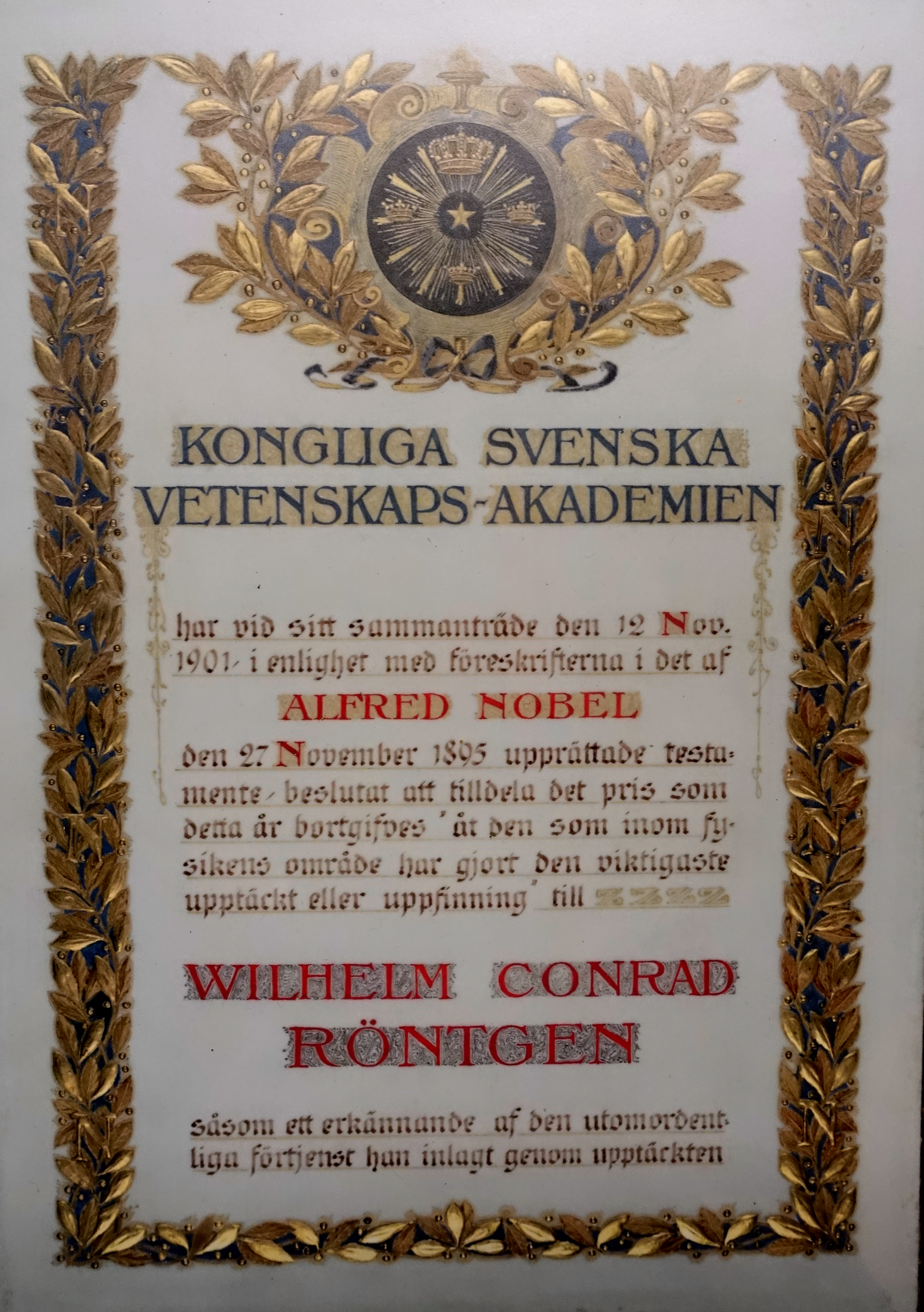
Diploma presented to Röntgen, which he donated to the University of Würzburg after his death (now in the Röntgen Memorial Site).

Röntgen was then presented with the Nobel diploma (designed by Sofia Gisberg) and medal from Crown Prince Gustaf, the future Gustaf V, in the King's absence. After the other medals were awarded, the laureates attended a banquet, held as until 1930 in the Grand Hôtel, Stockholm. Unlike the other laureates, Röntgen did not deliver a lecture the following day and left instead. In fact, he was intensely shy, refused interviews and resented publicity.

In accordance with Nobel's will, the prize money was divided to the laureates from the income of safe investments made by the Nobel Foundation from his vast fortune. In 1901, Röntgen received 150,782 kronor, worth about 10,769,099 kr. in 2023. Accounting for inflation, this would be the most paid to a Nobel laureate until 1991. It is sometimes said that Röntgen donated this prize to the University of Würzburg after his death—while he did dedicate nearly that amount in his testament of 1920 (200,000 M), it was never specifically linked to the Nobel Prize. In any case, the hyperinflation of the German Mark contemporary with Röntgen's death in 1923 essentially made his bequest worthless.

== Reactions ==
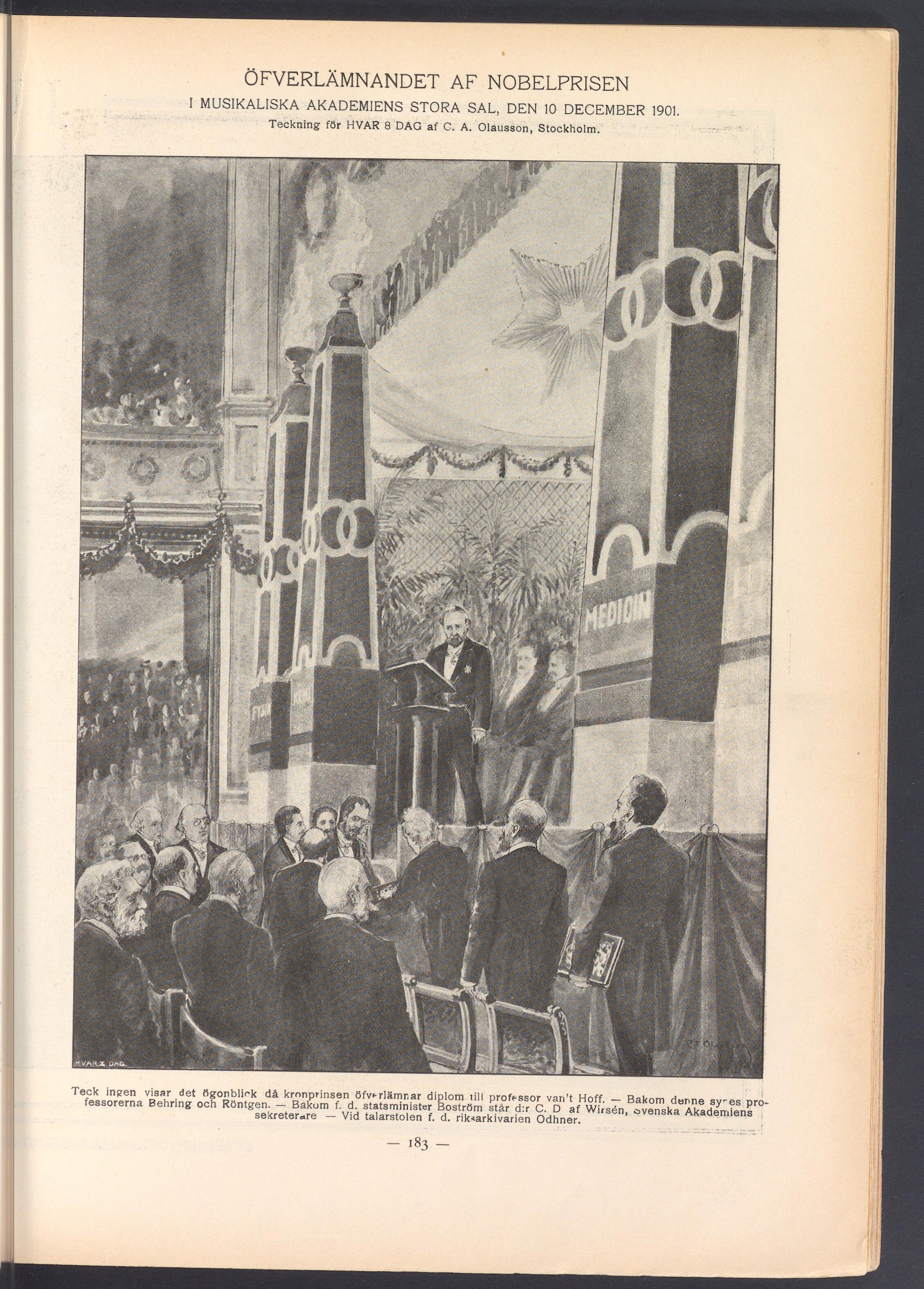
Drawing in Hvar 8 dag of Jacobus Henricus van 't Hoff receiving his Nobel Prize in Chemistry from Crown Prince Gustaf; Röntgen can be seen furthest right holding his diploma.

Despite the renown of Röntgen's invention, papers in the United States and the United Kingdom reported only cursorily on his receiving the Nobel Prize. Swedish press reports were more extensive. A number reprinted the faces and biographies of Röntgen and the other laureates. The Stockholms Dagblad commented on the laureates' "characteristic physiognomies", including Röntgen's "sharply defined face, projecting Teutonic strength with his long, bushy beard" (skarpt skurna ansigte, verkande med teutonens kraft i det långa, yfviga skägget).

The Motala Tidning commented that by the discovery of X-rays, Röntgen had earned "one of the foremost places of honour in the scientific world" (en af de främsta hedersplatserna inom den vetenskapliga världen). The Gothenburg Morgonpost wrote:

Den vetenskapliga betydelsen af Röntgens upptäckt måste skattas mycket högt. Ett förut helt okändt område öppnades för forskningen och kraftig impuls gafs åt arbetet på närgränsande forskningsfält.

[The scientific significance of Röntgen's discovery must be valued very highly. A previously completely unknown field was opened for research and a powerful impulse was given to work in adjacent fields of research.]

== See also ==
- List of Nobel laureates in Physics
- List of nominees for the Nobel Prize in Physics
- Nobel Prize in Physics
