= Mount Campbell =

Mount Campbell may refer to:

- Mount Campbell (Alaska), a mountain in the Valdez-Cordova (CA) region in Alaska
- Mount Campbell (Antarctica), a mountain in the Prince Olav Mountains of Antarctica
- Mount Campbell (California), a small mountain in Sierra Nevada foothills near Reedley, California, United States
- Mount Campbell (Canada), a mountain near Penticton, British Columbia, Canada
- Mount Campbell (Cariboo), a mountain near Barkerville, British Columbia, Canada
- Mount Campbell (Nunavut), a mountain in Nunavut, Canada
- Mount Campbell (New South Wales), a mountain in Tweed Shire, New South Wales, Australia
- Mount Campbell (Newfoundland and Labrador), a mountain in Newfoundland and Labrador, Canada
- Pukeone / Mount Campbell, a mountain in the Tasman region of New Zealand

== See also ==
- Campbell Mountain
- Campbell Peak
- Campbell Hill (disambiguation)
- Campbell Hills
- Campbell Hills (Antarctica)
