= Campbell Hill =

Campbell Hill may refer to:

== Elevations ==
- Campbell Hills (Antarctica)
- Campbell Hill, New South Wales, Australia
- Campbell Hill (Newfoundland and Labrador), Canada
- Campbell Hill (Ohio), U.S.
- Campbell Hills, Butte County, California, U.S.

== Inhabited places ==
- Campbell Hill, Illinois, U.S.

== See also ==
- Campbell Hall (disambiguation)
