= BD+30 3639 =

Wolf–Rayet-type central star of a planetary nebula in Cygnus

Campbell's Hydrogen Star
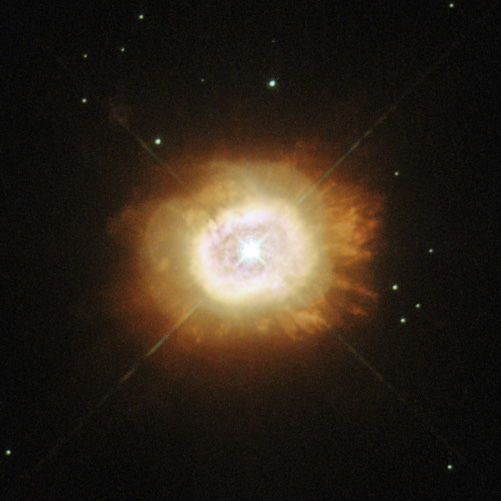
- Campbell's Hydrogen Star and its planetary nebula, imaged by the Hubble Space Telescope in 2013

Observation data Epoch J2000 Equinox ICRS
- Constellation: Cygnus
- Right ascension: 19^{h} 34^{m} 45.2338^{s}
- Declination: +30° 30′ 58.951″
- Apparent magnitude (V): 10.41

Characteristics
- Spectral type: [WC9]

Astrometry
Radial velocity (R_{v})	−30.4 km/s
Proper motion (μ)	RA: −2.241 mas/yr Dec.: −8.844 mas/yr
Parallax (π)	0.5863±0.0633 mas
Distance	c.3,900 ly (c.1,200 pc)
Absolute magnitude (M_{V})	−1.5

Details
Mass	0.6 M_{☉}
Radius	0.85 R_{☉}
Luminosity	6,000 L_{☉}
Temperature	55,000 K

Other designations
- Campbell's star, BD+30°3639, HD 184738, HIP 96295, PK 064+05 1, Henize 2-438

Database references
SIMBAD	data

BD+30°3639 is a variable Wolf–Rayet star in the constellation of Cygnus. Alternatively, it is known as HD 184738, Campbell's Hydrogen Star, or simply Campbell's Star. It is the central star of the planetary nebula PK 064+05 1. The star is named after the American astronomer William Wallace Campbell, who discovered it in 1893.

== Location ==
Campbell's Hydrogen Star lies about 2.5° north of Albireo (β Cygni) and 1° east of φ Cygni. Its distance from the Solar System is estimated at roughly 1,200 parsecs (3,900 ly).

== Characteristics ==
With an apparent magnitude of +10.41, Campbell's Hydrogen Star is too faint to be seen with the naked eye. It is a carbon-rich Wolf–Rayet-type star with a spectral type of [WC9]. The square brackets mark it as the central star of a planetary nebula rather than a massive Population I Wolf–Rayet star. It is extremely hot, with an effective temperature of about 55,000 K, and is about 6,000 times as luminous as the Sun.

The star is deficient in hydrogen and is in an advanced stage of stellar evolution. Its current mass is about 60% of the Sun's. It is thought to have descended from a progenitor of about 2 solar masses that has passed through the asymptotic giant branch phase. It will ultimately become a white dwarf.

Its chemical composition differs markedly from that of the Sun. It is deficient in iron (Fe/O ≈ 0.3) but has high abundances of carbon and neon, with a C/O ratio of about 30.

== Planetary nebula ==
The Hubble Space Telescope imaged the star and its surrounding planetary nebula (PK 064+05 1) in 2013. The nebula emits strongly in infrared wavelengths. It has an apparent diameter of about 0.13 arcminutes (roughly 8 arcseconds). Its age is estimated at about 700 to 800 years.

The dust around other late-type WC stars consists mainly of amorphous carbon. This nebula instead contains crystalline silicate dust, which points to a recent shift from oxygen-dominated chemistry to carbon-dominated chemistry. One proposal is that a stellar companion could explain both the composition of the nebula's dust and the hydrogen deficiency of the central star.
