= Nanny Cedercreutz =

Finnish author and physicist

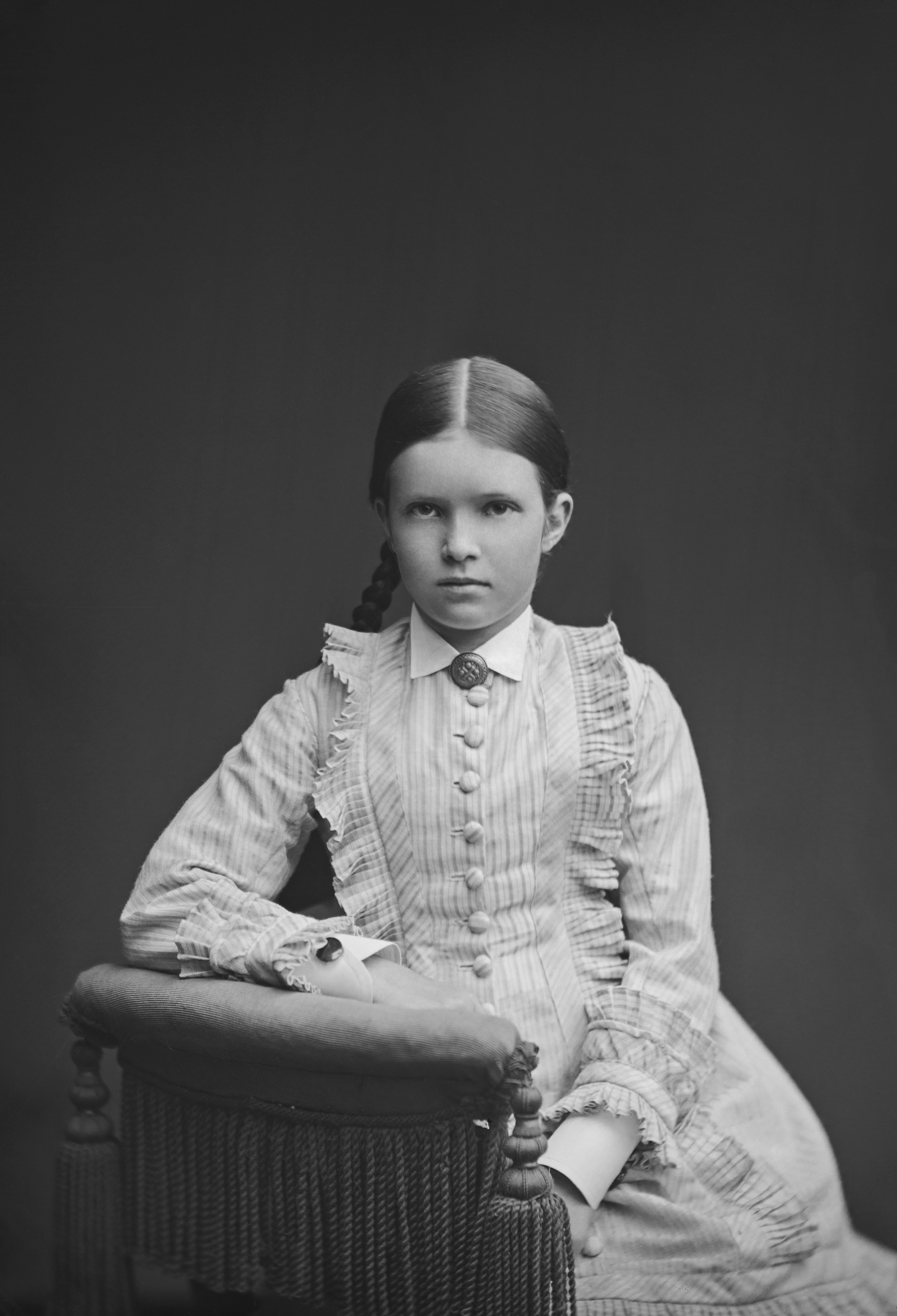
- Cedercreutz in 1878
- Born: Ebba Louise Nanny Cedercreutz; 19 March 1866; Cannes
- Died: 8 December 1950 (aged 84); Helsinki
- Education: Stockholm University; Sorbonne University
- Known for: Author and Physicist
- Spouse: Emil Waldemar Cedercreutz
- Children: Five

Ebba Louise Nanny Cedercreutz (née Lagerborg; 19 March 1866 in Cannes – 8 December 1950 in Helsinki) was a Finnish author and physicist.

== Biography ==
Cedercreutz's father was an engineer, statesman Alexander Wilhelm Lagerborg, who had travelled with his wife Anna Maria Christina (Nanny) Franzén to southern France to recover from tuberculosis. Nanny was born 19 March 1866 in Cannes, France, but the birth caused her mother's death. Her father married Amalia Tigerhjelm, Nanny's tutor five years later. Strong-willed and independent, Nanny enjoyed mountain climbing and hiking in Norway and Switzerland in her youth.

In 1885, she arrived in Geneva, Switzerland at the age of 19 to study French, but soon began to listen to mathematics and physics lectures held at Geneva University. She continued her studies in mathematics and physics at the Stockholm University from 1886 to 1889, and attended in particular the mathematics lessons of Gösta Mittag-Leffler and those of physics of Knut Ångström. She authored her doctoral dissertation on rock salt at the Stockholm University in 1888. After this, she studied mathematics at Sorbonne University in Paris. In 1890, Nanny Cedercreutz presented a paper to the Mathematical Society of France about the movement of a solid around a fixed point, and it was published in the Bulletin of the Society. She was invited as the second woman in the world to become a member of La Société mathématique de France (the first woman was Sofya Kovalevskaya, who was elected a member of the society in 1882). In the same year, Nanny also completed a licencie ès sciences mathématiques degree in mathematics at the Sorbonne.

In 1892, Nanny married the doctor Emil Waldemar Cedercreutz (1852–1924), with whom she had five children between 1893 and 1906: Carl Wilhelm Cedercreutz, Kjerstin Cedercreutz (who died a month after his birth), Per Skragge Skragge Cedercreutz, Lars Valdemar Cedercreutz and Eva Margareta Bang. Her husband's nephew of the same name was a well-known visual artist.

From 1912, she wrote, sometimes under a pseudonym (Ala or Bengt Ivarson), novels for young people, collections of poetry, a rhyming chronicle and travel and natural history stories. She also wrote an autobiography of her youth, illustrated with drawings and photographs.

Nanny Cedercreutz died at 85 on 8 December 1950 in Helsinki, Finland.

== Works ==
Between 1914 and 1948, she wrote thirteen books in Swedish; nine under her own name, one under the pseudonym Ala and three under the male name Bengt Ivarson.

Under her own name:

- Studies on the variation of refractive indices and the density of rock salt under the influence of temperature; fysiikan väitöskirja. Stockholm, 1888
- From the Alps and the sea. Söderström, Helsinki, 1914
- Fröken Milla Lund och Fiken, Hennes hund: en rimkrönika från nådens år 1916; silhouette by Emil Cedercreutz. Schildt, Helsingfors 1919 (Finnish translation: Miss Milla Lund and Ahnas, his dog: a rhyming short story of grace from 1916, Palladium books, Tampere 1996)
- At home and outside. The author, Helsinki 1934
- Wanderlust. Söderström, Helsinki 1935
- Travel memories. The author, Helsinki 1940
- My joy. The author, Helsinki 1943
- Uneven. The author, Helsinki 1945
- Alternation. The author, Helsinki 1946
- From different times. The author, Helsinki 1948

Under the pseudonym Ala:

- Arabella's Travels Told for Youth. Mercator, Helsinki 1912

Under the pseudonym Bengt Ivarson:

- Gifts and old ladies. Schildt, Helsinki 1917
- Kind and naughty. Schildt, Helsinki 1925
- Distressed and happy. Söderström, Helsinki 1932
