= List of Nobel laureates in Physics =

Front side (obverse) of the Nobel Prize Medal for Physics presented to Edward Victor Appleton in 1947

The Nobel Prize in Physics (Swedish: Nobelpriset i fysik) is awarded annually by the Royal Swedish Academy of Sciences to scientists in the various fields of physics. It is one of the five Nobel Prizes established by the 1895 will of Alfred Nobel (who died in 1896), awarded for outstanding contributions in physics. As dictated by Nobel's will, the award is administered by the Nobel Foundation and awarded by the Royal Swedish Academy of Sciences. The award is presented in Stockholm at an annual ceremony on 10 December, the anniversary of Nobel's death. Each recipient receives a medal, a diploma and a monetary award prize that has varied throughout the years.

== Statistics ==
The Nobel Prize in Physics has been awarded to 229 individuals as of 2025. The first prize in physics was awarded in 1901 to Wilhelm Conrad Röntgen, of Germany, who received 150,782 SEK. John Bardeen is the only laureate to win the prize twice—in 1956 and 1972.

William Lawrence Bragg was the youngest Nobel laureate in physics; he won the prize in 1915 at the age of 25. He was also the youngest laureate for any Nobel prize until 2014 (when Malala Yousafzai won the Nobel Peace Prize at the age of 17). The oldest Nobel Prize laureate in physics was Arthur Ashkin who was 96 years old when he was awarded the prize in 2018.

Only five women have won the prize: Maria Skłodowska-Curie (1903), Maria Goeppert-Mayer (1963), Donna Strickland (2018), Andrea Ghez (2020), and Anne L'Huillier (2023). Before L'Huillier, each woman only ever received a quarter share of the prize, although Maria Skłodowska-Curie did receive an unshared Nobel prize in chemistry in 1911. In 2023, L'Huillier received a one-third share.

There have been six years for which the Nobel Prize in Physics was not awarded (1916, 1931, 1934, 1940–1942). There were also nine years for which the Nobel Prize in Physics was delayed for one year:

- The 1914 prize awarded to Max von Laue was announced only in November 1915.
- The Prize was not awarded in 1917, as the Nobel Committee for Physics decided that none of that year's nominations met the necessary criteria, but was awarded to Charles Glover Barkla in 1918 and counted as the 1917 prize.
- This precedent was followed for the 1918 prize awarded to Max Planck in 1919,
- the 1921 prize awarded to Albert Einstein in 1922,
- the 1924 prize awarded to Manne Siegbahn in 1925,
- the 1925 prize awarded to James Franck and Gustav Hertz in 1926,
- the 1928 prize awarded to Owen Richardson in 1929,
- the 1932 prize awarded to Werner Heisenberg in 1933, and
- the 1943 prize awarded to Otto Stern in 1944.

A 2020 study reported that half of the Nobel Prizes for science awarded between 1995 and 2017 are clustered in few disciplines. Particle physics (14%), atomic physics (10.9%), and 3 non-physics disciplines dominate the prize in recent decades, followed by semiconductor physics and magnetics.

== Laureates ==
Year	Laureate		Country (Note: The country in which the laureate's academic affiliation is based, according to the Nobel Prize website.)	Citation	Ref.
Year	Image	Name	Country	Citation	Ref.
1901		Wilhelm Conrad Röntgen	Germany	"In recognition of the extraordinary services he has rendered by the discovery of the remarkable rays subsequently named after him."	
1902		Hendrik Antoon Lorentz	Netherlands	"In recognition of the extraordinary service they rendered by their researches into the influence of magnetism upon radiation phenomena."	
1902		Pieter Zeeman	Netherlands	"In recognition of the extraordinary service they rendered by their researches into the influence of magnetism upon radiation phenomena."	
1903		Antoine Henri Becquerel	France	"In recognition of the extraordinary services he has rendered by his discovery of spontaneous radioactivity."	
1903		Pierre Curie	France	"In recognition of the extraordinary services they have rendered by their joint researches on the radiation phenomena discovered by Professor Henri Becquerel."	
1903		Maria Skłodowska-Curie	France	"In recognition of the extraordinary services they have rendered by their joint researches on the radiation phenomena discovered by Professor Henri Becquerel."	
1904		Lord Rayleigh	United Kingdom	"For his investigations of the densities of the most important gases and for his discovery of argon in connection with these studies."	
1905		Philipp Eduard Anton von Lenard	Germany	"For his work on cathode rays."	
1906		Joseph John Thomson	United Kingdom	"In recognition of the great merits of his theoretical and experimental investigations on the conduction of electricity by gases."	
1907		Albert Abraham Michelson	United States	"For his optical precision instruments and the spectroscopic and metrological investigations carried out with their aid."	
1908		Gabriel Lippmann	France	"For his method of reproducing colours photographically based on the phenomenon of interference."	
1909		Guglielmo Marconi	United Kingdom	"In recognition of their contributions to the development of wireless telegraphy."	
1909		Karl Ferdinand Braun	Germany	"In recognition of their contributions to the development of wireless telegraphy."	
1910		Johannes Diderik van der Waals	Netherlands	"For his work on the equation of state for gases and liquids."	
1911		Wilhelm Wien	Germany	"For his discoveries regarding the laws governing the radiation of heat."	
1912		Nils Gustaf Dalén	Sweden	"For his invention of automatic regulators for use in conjunction with gas accumulators for illuminating lighthouses and buoys."	
1913		Heike Kamerlingh Onnes	Netherlands	"For his investigations on the properties of matter at low temperatures which led, inter alia, to the production of liquid helium."	
1914		Max von Laue	Germany	"For his discovery of the diffraction of X-rays by crystals."	
1915		William Henry Bragg	United Kingdom	"For their services in the analysis of crystal structure by means of X-rays."	
1915		William Lawrence Bragg	United Kingdom	"For their services in the analysis of crystal structure by means of X-rays."	
1916	No award				
1917		Charles Glover Barkla	United Kingdom	"For his discovery of the characteristic Röntgen radiation of the elements."	
1918		Max Karl Ernst Ludwig Planck	Germany	"In recognition of the services he rendered to the advancement of Physics by his discovery of energy quanta."	
1919		Johannes Stark	Germany	"For his discovery of the Doppler effect in canal rays and the splitting of spectral lines in electric fields."	
1920		Charles Édouard Guillaume	France	"In recognition of the service he has rendered to precision measurements in Physics by his discovery of anomalies in nickel steel alloys."	
1921		Albert Einstein	Germany	"For his services to Theoretical Physics, and especially for his discovery of the law of the photoelectric effect."	
1922		Niels Henrik David Bohr	Denmark	"for his services in the investigation of the structure of atoms and of the radiation emanating from them."	
1923		Robert Andrews Millikan	United States	"For his work on the elementary charge of electricity and on the photoelectric effect."	
1924		Karl Manne Georg Siegbahn	Sweden	"For his discoveries and research in the field of X-ray spectroscopy."	
1925		James Franck	Germany	"For their discovery of the laws governing the impact of an electron upon an atom."	
1925		Gustav Ludwig Hertz	Germany	"For their discovery of the laws governing the impact of an electron upon an atom."	
1926		Jean Baptiste Perrin	France	"For his work on the discontinuous structure of matter, and especially for his discovery of sedimentation equilibrium."	
1927		Arthur Holly Compton	United States	"For his discovery of the effect named after him."	
1927		Charles Thomson Rees Wilson	United Kingdom	"For his method of making the paths of electrically charged particles visible by condensation of vapour."	
1928		Owen Willans Richardson	United Kingdom	"For his work on the thermionic phenomenon and especially for the discovery of the law named after him."	
1929		Louis-Victor Pierre Raymond de Broglie	France	"For his discovery of the wave nature of electrons."	
1930		Chandrasekhara Venkata Raman	India	"For his work on the scattering of light and for the discovery of the effect named after him."	
1931	No award				
1932		Werner Karl Heisenberg	Germany	"For the creation of quantum mechanics, the application of which has, inter alia, led to the discovery of the allotropic forms of hydrogen."	
1933		Erwin Schrödinger	Germany	"For the discovery of new productive forms of atomic theory."	
1933		Paul Adrien Maurice Dirac	United Kingdom	"For the discovery of new productive forms of atomic theory."	
1934	No award				
1935		James Chadwick	United Kingdom	"For the discovery of the neutron."	
1936		Victor Franz Hess	Austria	"For his discovery of cosmic radiation."	
1936		Carl David Anderson	United States	"For his discovery of the positron."	
1937		Clinton Joseph Davisson	United States	"For their experimental discovery of the diffraction of electrons by crystals."	
1937		George Paget Thomson	United Kingdom	"For their experimental discovery of the diffraction of electrons by crystals."	
1938		Enrico Fermi	Italy	"For his demonstrations of the existence of new radioactive elements produced by neutron irradiation, and for his related discovery of nuclear reactions brought about by slow neutrons."	
1939		Ernest Orlando Lawrence	United States	"For the invention and development of the cyclotron and for results obtained with it, especially with regard to artificial radioactive elements."	
1940	No award				
1941	No award				
1942	No award				
1943		Otto Stern	United States	"For his contribution to the development of the molecular ray method and his discovery of the magnetic moment of the proton."	
1944		Isidor Isaac Rabi	United States	"For his resonance method for recording the magnetic properties of atomic nuclei."	
1945		Wolfgang Pauli	United States	"For the discovery of the Exclusion Principle, also called the Pauli Principle."	
1946		Percy Williams Bridgman	United States	"For the invention of an apparatus to produce extremely high pressures, and for the discoveries he made therewith in the field of high pressure physics."	
1947		Edward Victor Appleton	United Kingdom	"For his investigations of the physics of the upper atmosphere especially for the discovery of the so-called Appleton layer."	
1948		Patrick Maynard Stuart Blackett	United Kingdom	"For his development of the Wilson cloud chamber method, and his discoveries therewith in the fields of nuclear physics and cosmic radiation."	
1949		Hideki Yukawa	United States; Japan	"For his prediction of the existence of mesons on the basis of theoretical work on nuclear forces."	
1950		Cecil Frank Powell	United Kingdom	"For his development of the photographic method of studying nuclear processes and his discoveries regarding mesons made with this method."	
1951		John Douglas Cockcroft	United Kingdom	"For their pioneer work on the transmutation of atomic nuclei by artificially accelerated atomic particles."	
1951		Ernest Thomas Sinton Walton	Ireland	"For their pioneer work on the transmutation of atomic nuclei by artificially accelerated atomic particles."	
1952		Felix Bloch	United States	"For their development of new methods for nuclear magnetic precision measurements and discoveries in connection therewith."	
1952		Edward Mills Purcell	United States	"For their development of new methods for nuclear magnetic precision measurements and discoveries in connection therewith."	
1953		Frits Zernike	Netherlands	"For his demonstration of the phase contrast method, especially for his invention of the phase contrast microscope."	
1954		Max Born	United Kingdom	"For his fundamental research in quantum mechanics, especially for his statistical interpretation of the wavefunction."	
1954		Walther Bothe	West Germany	"For the coincidence method and his discoveries made therewith."	
1955		Willis Eugene Lamb	United States	"For his discoveries concerning the fine structure of the hydrogen spectrum."	
1955		Polykarp Kusch	United States	"For his precision determination of the magnetic moment of the electron."	
1956		William Bradford Shockley	United States	"For their researches on semiconductors and their discovery of the transistor effect."	
1956		John Bardeen	United States	"For their researches on semiconductors and their discovery of the transistor effect."	
1956		Walter Houser Brattain	United States	"For their researches on semiconductors and their discovery of the transistor effect."	
1957		Chen Ning Yang	United States	"For their penetrating investigation of the so-called parity laws which has led to important discoveries regarding the elementary particles."	
1957		Tsung-Dao Lee	United States	"For their penetrating investigation of the so-called parity laws which has led to important discoveries regarding the elementary particles."	
1958		Pavel Alekseyevich Cherenkov	Soviet Union	"For the discovery and the interpretation of the Cherenkov effect."	
1958		Il'ja Mikhailovich Frank	Soviet Union	"For the discovery and the interpretation of the Cherenkov effect."	
1958		Igor Yevgenyevich Tamm	Soviet Union	"For the discovery and the interpretation of the Cherenkov effect."	
1959		Emilio Gino Segrè	United States	"For their discovery of the antiproton."	
1959		Owen Chamberlain	United States	"For their discovery of the antiproton."	
1960		Donald Arthur Glaser	United States	"For the invention of the bubble chamber."	
1961		Robert Hofstadter	United States	"For his pioneering studies of electron scattering in atomic nuclei and for his thereby achieved discoveries concerning the structure of the nucleons."	
1961		Rudolf Ludwig Mössbauer	West Germany	"For his researches concerning the resonance absorption of gamma radiation and his discovery in this connection of the effect which bears his name."	
1962		Lev Davidovich Landau	Soviet Union	"For his pioneering theories for condensed matter, especially liquid helium."	
1963		Eugene Paul Wigner	United States	"For his contributions to the theory of the atomic nucleus and the elementary particles, particularly through the discovery and application of fundamental symmetry principles."	
1963		Maria Goeppert Mayer	United States	"For their discoveries concerning nuclear shell structure."	
1963		J. Hans D. Jensen	West Germany	"For their discoveries concerning nuclear shell structure."	
1964		Charles Hard Townes	United States	"For fundamental work in the field of quantum electronics, which has led to the construction of oscillators and amplifiers based on the maser-laser principle."	
1964		Nicolay Gennadiyevich Basov	Soviet Union	"For fundamental work in the field of quantum electronics, which has led to the construction of oscillators and amplifiers based on the maser-laser principle."	
1964		Aleksandr Mikhailovich Prokhorov	Soviet Union	"For fundamental work in the field of quantum electronics, which has led to the construction of oscillators and amplifiers based on the maser-laser principle."	
1965		Sin-Itiro Tomonaga	Japan	"For their fundamental work in quantum electrodynamics, with deep-ploughing consequences for the physics of elementary particles."	
1965		Julian Schwinger	United States	"For their fundamental work in quantum electrodynamics, with deep-ploughing consequences for the physics of elementary particles."	
1965		Richard P. Feynman	United States	"For their fundamental work in quantum electrodynamics, with deep-ploughing consequences for the physics of elementary particles."	
1966		Alfred Kastler	France	"For the discovery and development of optical methods for studying Hertzian resonances in atoms."	
1967		Hans Albrecht Bethe	United States	"For his contributions to the theory of nuclear reactions, especially his discoveries concerning the energy production in stars."	
1968		Luis Walter Alvarez	United States	"For his decisive contributions to elementary particle physics, in particular the discovery of a large number of resonance states, made possible through his development of the technique of using hydrogen bubble chamber and data analysis."	
1969		Murray Gell-Mann	United States	"For his contributions and discoveries concerning the classification of elementary particles and their interactions."	
1970		Hannes Olof Gösta Alfvén	Sweden	"For fundamental work and discoveries in magnetohydro-dynamics with fruitful applications in different parts of plasma physics."	
1970		Louis Eugène Félix Néel	France	"for fundamental work and discoveries concerning antiferromagnetism and ferrimagnetism which have led to important applications in solid state physics."	
1971		Dennis Gabor	United Kingdom	"For his invention and development of the holographic method."	
1972		John Bardeen	United States	"For their jointly developed theory of superconductivity, usually called the BCS-theory."	
1972		Leon Neil Cooper	United States	"For their jointly developed theory of superconductivity, usually called the BCS-theory."	
1972		John Robert Schrieffer	United States	"For their jointly developed theory of superconductivity, usually called the BCS-theory."	
1973		Leo Esaki	United States	"For their experimental discoveries regarding tunneling phenomena in semiconductors and superconductors, respectively."	
1973		Ivar Giaever	United States	"For their experimental discoveries regarding tunneling phenomena in semiconductors and superconductors, respectively."	
1973		Brian David Josephson	United Kingdom	"For his theoretical predictions of the properties of a supercurrent through a tunnel barrier, in particular those phenomena which are generally known as the Josephson effects."	
1974		Martin Ryle	United Kingdom	"For their pioneering research in radio astrophysics: Ryle for his observations and inventions, in particular of the aperture synthesis technique, and Hewish for his decisive role in the discovery of pulsars."	
1974		Antony Hewish	United Kingdom	"For their pioneering research in radio astrophysics: Ryle for his observations and inventions, in particular of the aperture synthesis technique, and Hewish for his decisive role in the discovery of pulsars."	
1975		Aage Niels Bohr	Denmark	"For the discovery of the connection between collective motion and particle motion in atomic nuclei and the development of the theory of the structure of the atomic nucleus based on this connection."	
1975		Ben Roy Mottelson	Denmark	"For the discovery of the connection between collective motion and particle motion in atomic nuclei and the development of the theory of the structure of the atomic nucleus based on this connection."	
1975		Leo James Rainwater	United States	"For the discovery of the connection between collective motion and particle motion in atomic nuclei and the development of the theory of the structure of the atomic nucleus based on this connection."	
1976		Burton Richter	United States	"For their pioneering work in the discovery of a heavy elementary particle of a new kind."	
1976		Samuel Chao Chung Ting	United States	"For their pioneering work in the discovery of a heavy elementary particle of a new kind."	
1977		Philip Warren Anderson	United States	"For their fundamental theoretical investigations of the electronic structure of magnetic and disordered systems."	
1977		Nevill Francis Mott	United Kingdom	"For their fundamental theoretical investigations of the electronic structure of magnetic and disordered systems."	
1977		John Hasbrouck Van Vleck	United States	"For their fundamental theoretical investigations of the electronic structure of magnetic and disordered systems."	
1978		Pyotr Leonidovich Kapitsa	Soviet Union	"For his basic inventions and discoveries in the area of low-temperature physics."	
1978		Arno Allan Penzias	United States	"For their discovery of cosmic microwave background radiation."	
1978		Robert Woodrow Wilson	United States	"For their discovery of cosmic microwave background radiation."	
1979		Sheldon Lee Glashow	United States	"For their contributions to the theory of the unified weak and electromagnetic interaction between elementary particles, including, inter alia, the prediction of the weak neutral current."	
1979		Abdus Salam	Italy; United Kingdom	"For their contributions to the theory of the unified weak and electromagnetic interaction between elementary particles, including, inter alia, the prediction of the weak neutral current."	
1979		Steven Weinberg	United States	"For their contributions to the theory of the unified weak and electromagnetic interaction between elementary particles, including, inter alia, the prediction of the weak neutral current."	
1980		James Watson Cronin	United States	"For the discovery of violations of fundamental symmetry principles in the decay of neutral K-mesons."	
1980		Val Logsdon Fitch	United States	"For the discovery of violations of fundamental symmetry principles in the decay of neutral K-mesons."	
1981		Nicolaas Bloembergen	United States	"For their contribution to the development of laser spectroscopy."	
1981		Arthur Leonard Schawlow	United States	"For their contribution to the development of laser spectroscopy."	
1981		Kai M. Siegbahn	Sweden	"For his contribution to the development of high-resolution electron spectroscopy."	
1982	Kenneth G. Wilson		United States	"For his theory for critical phenomena in connection with phase transitions."	
1983		Subrahmanyan Chandrasekhar	United States	"For his theoretical studies of the physical processes of importance to the structure and evolution of the stars."	
1983		William Alfred Fowler	United States	"For his theoretical and experimental studies of the nuclear reactions of importance in the formation of the chemical elements in the universe."	
1984		Carlo Rubbia	Switzerland	"For their decisive contributions to the large project, which led to the discovery of the field particles W and Z, communicators of weak interaction."	
1984		Simon van der Meer	Switzerland	"For their decisive contributions to the large project, which led to the discovery of the field particles W and Z, communicators of weak interaction."	
1985		Klaus von Klitzing	West Germany	"For the discovery of the quantized Hall effect."	
1986	Ernst Ruska		West Germany	"For his fundamental work in electron optics, and for the design of the first electron microscope."	
1986		Gerd Binnig	Switzerland	"For their design of the scanning tunneling microscope."	
1986		Heinrich Rohrer	Switzerland	"For their design of the scanning tunneling microscope."	
1987		J. Georg Bednorz	Switzerland	"For their important break-through in the discovery of superconductivity in ceramic materials."	
1987		K. Alexander Müller	Switzerland	"For their important break-through in the discovery of superconductivity in ceramic materials."	
1988		Leon M. Lederman	United States	"For the neutrino beam method and the demonstration of the doublet structure of the leptons through the discovery of the muon neutrino."	
1988		Melvin Schwartz	United States	"For the neutrino beam method and the demonstration of the doublet structure of the leptons through the discovery of the muon neutrino."	
1988		Jack Steinberger	Switzerland	"For the neutrino beam method and the demonstration of the doublet structure of the leptons through the discovery of the muon neutrino."	
1989		Norman F. Ramsey	United States	"For the invention of the separated oscillatory fields method and its use in the hydrogen maser and other atomic clocks."	
1989		Hans G. Dehmelt	United States	"For the development of the ion trap technique."	
1989	Wolfgang Paul		West Germany	"For the development of the ion trap technique."	
1990		Jerome I. Friedman	United States	"For their pioneering investigations concerning deep inelastic scattering of electrons on protons and bound neutrons, which have been of essential importance for the development of the quark model in particle physics."	
1990		Henry W. Kendall	United States	"For their pioneering investigations concerning deep inelastic scattering of electrons on protons and bound neutrons, which have been of essential importance for the development of the quark model in particle physics."	
1990		Richard E. Taylor	United States	"For their pioneering investigations concerning deep inelastic scattering of electrons on protons and bound neutrons, which have been of essential importance for the development of the quark model in particle physics."	
1991		Pierre-Gilles de Gennes	France	"For discovering that methods developed for studying order phenomena in simple systems can be generalized to more complex forms of matter, in particular to liquid crystals and polymers."	
1992		Georges Charpak	France; Switzerland	"For his invention and development of particle detectors, in particular the multiwire proportional chamber."	
1993		Russell A. Hulse	United States	"For the discovery of a new type of pulsar, a discovery that has opened up new possibilities for the study of gravitation."	
1993		Joseph H. Taylor Jr.	United States	"For the discovery of a new type of pulsar, a discovery that has opened up new possibilities for the study of gravitation."	
1994		Bertram N. Brockhouse	Canada	"For the development of neutron spectroscopy."	
1994		Clifford G. Shull	United States	"For the development of the neutron diffraction technique."	
1995		Martin L. Perl	United States	"For the discovery of the tau lepton."	
1995		Frederick Reines	United States	"For the detection of the neutrino."	
1996		David M. Lee	United States	"For their discovery of superfluidity in helium-3."	
1996		Douglas D. Osheroff	United States	"For their discovery of superfluidity in helium-3."	
1996		Robert C. Richardson	United States	"For their discovery of superfluidity in helium-3."	
1997		Steven Chu	United States	"For development of methods to cool and trap atoms with laser light."	
1997		Claude Cohen-Tannoudji	France	"For development of methods to cool and trap atoms with laser light."	
1997		William D. Phillips	United States	"For development of methods to cool and trap atoms with laser light."	
1998		Robert B. Laughlin	United States	"For their discovery of a new form of quantum fluid with fractionally charged excitations."	
1998		Horst L. Störmer	United States	"For their discovery of a new form of quantum fluid with fractionally charged excitations."	
1998		Daniel C. Tsui	United States	"For their discovery of a new form of quantum fluid with fractionally charged excitations."	
1999		Gerardus 't Hooft	Netherlands	"For elucidating the quantum structure of electroweak interactions in physics."	
1999		Martinus J. G. Veltman	Netherlands	"For elucidating the quantum structure of electroweak interactions in physics."	
2000		Zhores I. Alferov	Russia	"For developing semiconductor heterostructures used in high-speed- and opto-electronics."	
2000		Herbert Kroemer	United States	"For developing semiconductor heterostructures used in high-speed- and opto-electronics."	
2000		Jack S. Kilby	United States	"For his part in the invention of the integrated circuit."	
2001		Eric A. Cornell	United States	"For the achievement of Bose-Einstein condensation in dilute gases of alkali atoms, and for early fundamental studies of the properties of the condensates."	
2001		Wolfgang Ketterle	United States	"For the achievement of Bose-Einstein condensation in dilute gases of alkali atoms, and for early fundamental studies of the properties of the condensates."	
2001		Carl E. Wieman	United States	"For the achievement of Bose-Einstein condensation in dilute gases of alkali atoms, and for early fundamental studies of the properties of the condensates."	
2002		Raymond Davis Jr.	United States	"For pioneering contributions to astrophysics, in particular for the detection of cosmic neutrinos."	
2002		Masatoshi Koshiba	Japan	"For pioneering contributions to astrophysics, in particular for the detection of cosmic neutrinos."	
2002		Riccardo Giacconi	United States	"For pioneering contributions to astrophysics, which have led to the discovery of cosmic X-ray sources."	
2003		Alexei A. Abrikosov	United States	"For pioneering contributions to the theory of superconductors and superfluids."	
2003		Vitaly L. Ginzburg	Russia	"For pioneering contributions to the theory of superconductors and superfluids."	
2003		Anthony J. Leggett	United States	"For pioneering contributions to the theory of superconductors and superfluids."	
2004		David J. Gross	United States	"For the discovery of asymptotic freedom in the theory of the strong interaction."	
2004		H. David Politzer	United States	"For the discovery of asymptotic freedom in the theory of the strong interaction."	
2004		Frank Wilczek	United States	"For the discovery of asymptotic freedom in the theory of the strong interaction."	
2005		Roy J. Glauber	United States	"For his contribution to the quantum theory of optical coherence."	
2005		John L. Hall	United States	"For their contributions to the development of laser-based precision spectroscopy, including the optical frequency comb technique."	
2005		Theodor W. Hänsch	Germany	"For their contributions to the development of laser-based precision spectroscopy, including the optical frequency comb technique."	
2006		John C. Mather	United States	"For their discovery of the blackbody form and anisotropy of the cosmic microwave background radiation."	
2006		George F. Smoot	United States	"For their discovery of the blackbody form and anisotropy of the cosmic microwave background radiation."	
2007		Albert Fert	France	"For the discovery of Giant Magnetoresistance."	
2007		Peter Grünberg	Germany	"For the discovery of Giant Magnetoresistance."	
2008		Yoichiro Nambu	United States	"For the discovery of the mechanism of spontaneous broken symmetry in subatomic physics."	
2008		Makoto Kobayashi	Japan	"For the discovery of the origin of the broken symmetry which predicts the existence of at least three families of quarks in nature."	
2008		Toshihide Maskawa	Japan	"For the discovery of the origin of the broken symmetry which predicts the existence of at least three families of quarks in nature."	
2009		Charles Kuen Kao	United Kingdom; China	"For groundbreaking achievements concerning the transmission of light in fibers for optical communication."	
2009		Willard S. Boyle	United States	"For the invention of an imaging semiconductor circuit - the CCD sensor."	
2009		George E. Smith	United States	"For the invention of an imaging semiconductor circuit - the CCD sensor."	
2010		Andre Geim	United Kingdom	"For groundbreaking experiments regarding the two-dimensional material graphene."	
2010		Konstantin Novoselov	United Kingdom	"For groundbreaking experiments regarding the two-dimensional material graphene."	
2011		Saul Perlmutter	United States	"For the discovery of the accelerating expansion of the Universe through observations of distant supernovae."	
2011		Brian P. Schmidt	Australia	"For the discovery of the accelerating expansion of the Universe through observations of distant supernovae."	
2011		Adam G. Riess	United States	"For the discovery of the accelerating expansion of the Universe through observations of distant supernovae."	
2012		Serge Haroche	France	"For ground-breaking experimental methods that enable measuring and manipulation of individual quantum systems."	
2012		David J. Wineland	United States	"For ground-breaking experimental methods that enable measuring and manipulation of individual quantum systems."	
2013		François Englert	Belgium	"For the theoretical discovery of a mechanism that contributes to our understanding of the origin of mass of subatomic particles, and which recently was confirmed through the discovery of the predicted fundamental particle, by the ATLAS and CMS experiments at CERN's Large Hadron Collider."	
2013		Peter W. Higgs	United Kingdom	"For the theoretical discovery of a mechanism that contributes to our understanding of the origin of mass of subatomic particles, and which recently was confirmed through the discovery of the predicted fundamental particle, by the ATLAS and CMS experiments at CERN's Large Hadron Collider."	
2014		Isamu Akasaki	Japan	"For the invention of efficient blue light-emitting diodes which has enabled bright and energy-saving white light sources."	
2014		Hiroshi Amano	Japan	"For the invention of efficient blue light-emitting diodes which has enabled bright and energy-saving white light sources."	
2014		Shuji Nakamura	United States	"For the invention of efficient blue light-emitting diodes which has enabled bright and energy-saving white light sources."	
2015		Takaaki Kajita	Japan	"For the discovery of neutrino oscillations, which shows that neutrinos have mass."	
2015		Arthur B. McDonald	Canada	"For the discovery of neutrino oscillations, which shows that neutrinos have mass."	
2016		David J. Thouless	United States	"For theoretical discoveries of topological phase transitions and topological phases of matter."	
2016		F. Duncan M. Haldane	United States	"For theoretical discoveries of topological phase transitions and topological phases of matter."	
2016		J. Michael Kosterlitz	United States	"For theoretical discoveries of topological phase transitions and topological phases of matter."	
2017		Rainer Weiss	United States	"For decisive contributions to the LIGO detector and the observation of gravitational waves."	
2017		Barry C. Barish	United States	"For decisive contributions to the LIGO detector and the observation of gravitational waves."	
2017		Kip S. Thorne	United States	"For decisive contributions to the LIGO detector and the observation of gravitational waves."	
2018		Arthur Ashkin	United States	"For the optical tweezers and their application to biological systems."	
2018		Gérard Mourou	France; United States	"For their method of generating high-intensity, ultra-short optical pulses."	
2018		Donna Strickland	Canada	"For their method of generating high-intensity, ultra-short optical pulses."	
2019		James Peebles	United States	"For theoretical discoveries in physical cosmology."	
2019		Michel Mayor	Switzerland	"For the discovery of an exoplanet orbiting a solar-type star."	
2019		Didier Queloz	Switzerland; United Kingdom	"For the discovery of an exoplanet orbiting a solar-type star."	
2020		Roger Penrose	United Kingdom	"For the discovery that black hole formation is a robust prediction of the general theory of relativity."	
2020		Reinhard Genzel	Germany; United States	"For the discovery of a supermassive compact object at the centre of our galaxy."	
2020		Andrea Ghez	United States	"For the discovery of a supermassive compact object at the centre of our galaxy."	
2021		Syukuro Manabe	United States	"For the physical modelling of Earth’s climate, quantifying variability and reliably predicting global warming."	
2021	Klaus Hasselmann		Germany	"For the physical modelling of Earth’s climate, quantifying variability and reliably predicting global warming."	
2021		Giorgio Parisi	Italy	"For the discovery of the interplay of disorder and fluctuations in physical systems from atomic to planetary scales."	
2022		Alain Aspect	France	"For experiments with entangled photons, establishing the violation of Bell inequalities and pioneering quantum information science."	
2022		John F. Clauser	United States	"For experiments with entangled photons, establishing the violation of Bell inequalities and pioneering quantum information science."	
2022		Anton Zeilinger	Austria	"For experiments with entangled photons, establishing the violation of Bell inequalities and pioneering quantum information science."	
2023		Pierre Agostini	United States	"For experimental methods that generate attosecond pulses of light for the study of electron dynamics in matter."	
2023		Ferenc Krausz	Germany	"For experimental methods that generate attosecond pulses of light for the study of electron dynamics in matter."	
2023		Anne L’Huillier	Sweden	"For experimental methods that generate attosecond pulses of light for the study of electron dynamics in matter."	
2024		John J. Hopfield	United States	"For foundational discoveries and inventions that enable machine learning with artificial neural networks."	
2024		Geoffrey Hinton	Canada	"For foundational discoveries and inventions that enable machine learning with artificial neural networks."	
2025		John Clarke	United States	"For the discovery of macroscopic quantum mechanical tunnelling and energy quantisation in an electric circuit."	
2025		Michel H. Devoret	United States	"For the discovery of macroscopic quantum mechanical tunnelling and energy quantisation in an electric circuit."	
2025		John M. Martinis	United States	"For the discovery of macroscopic quantum mechanical tunnelling and energy quantisation in an electric circuit."	
2026		Francis Halzen	BelgiumUnited States	"For the IceCube Neutrino Observatory – a cubic kilometre of ice that is equipped with light sensors. Using IceCube, researchers can capture neutrinos from extremely energy-rich processes in the distant universe."	

=== Number of Nobel laureates in Physics by country ===
Country	Number
United States	116
United Kingdom	28
Germany	23
France	16
Switzerland	10
Russia / Soviet Union	9
Japan	8
Netherlands	7
Sweden	5
Canada	3
Denmark	3
Italy	3
Austria	2
Australia	1
Belgium	2
China	1
India	1
Ireland	1

== See also ==
- List of Nobel laureates
- List of Nobel laureates by country
- List of physicists
