= Campbell Hall =

Campbell Hall can refer to:

- Campbell Hall (UC Berkeley), an academic building
- Campbell Hall School in North Hollywood, California
- A hamlet in the town of Hamptonburgh, New York
  - Campbell Hall (Metro-North station), in the hamlet
- A residence hall at Virginia Tech
- A residence hall at Rutgers University
- A residence hall at Mount Allison University
- A residence hall at University of Northern Iowa
