= Robert Thalén =

Swedish physicist (1827–1905)

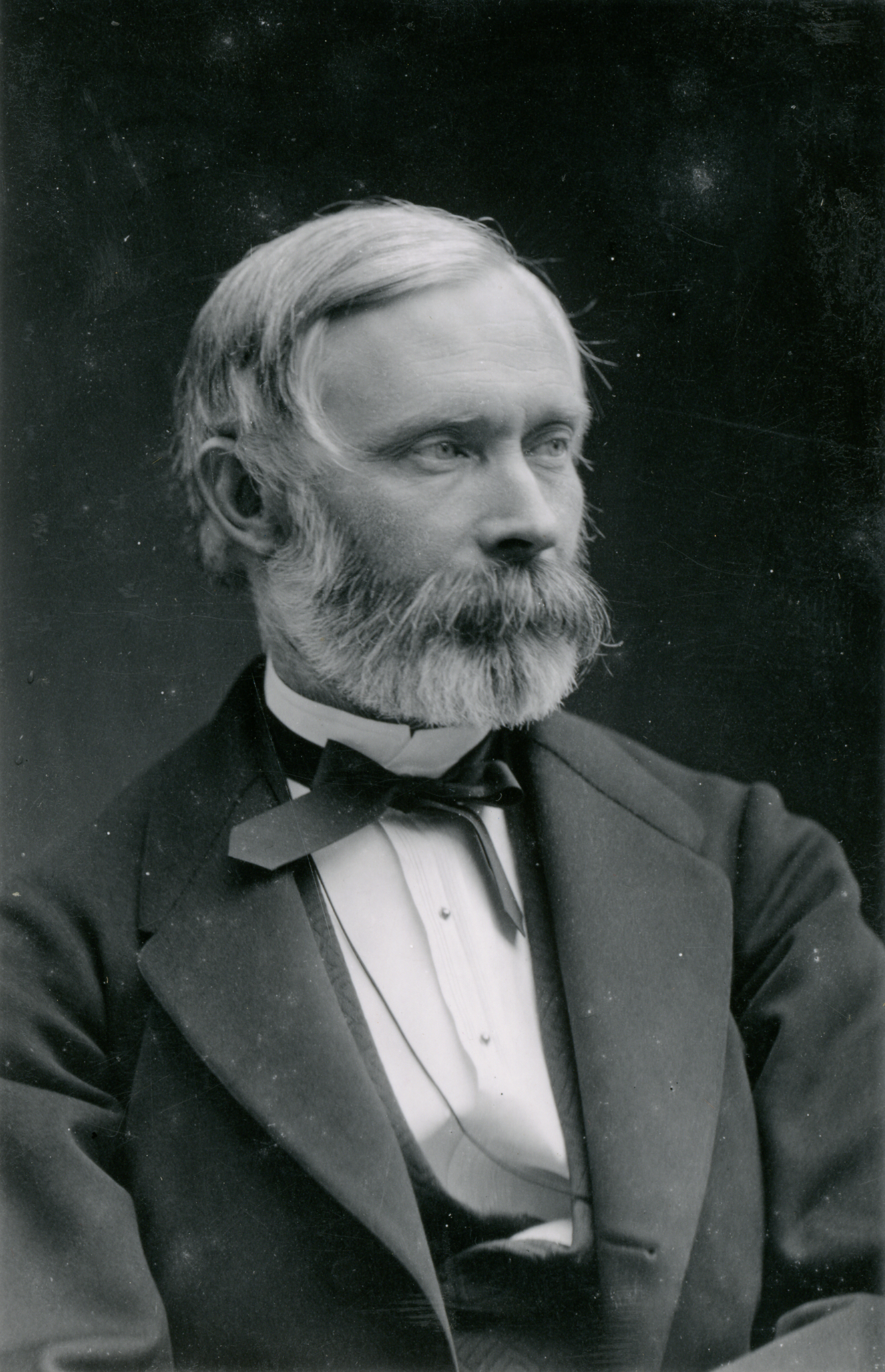
- Robert Thalén, ca 1890-1905.
- Born: 28 December 1827; Köping, Sweden
- Died: 27 July 1905 (aged 77); Uppsala, Sweden
- Occupation: Professor of physics
- Awards: Rumford Medal 1884

Tobias Robert Thalén Hon. FRSE (28 December 1827 – 27 July 1905) was a Swedish physicist. He was awarded the Rumford Medal in 1884 for his spectroscopic researches. He was an expert on terrestrial magnetism and spectrum analysis. He gives his name to the crystalline mineral Thalenite.

He worked closely with Anders Ångström. Together they measured and recorded the spectral lines of many elements and created the science of spectral analysis.

== Life ==
He was born in Koping on 28 December 1827.

In 1849, he began studies at the University of Upsala. He gained a doctorate in physics (DPh) in 1854. In 1856, he began lecturing in astronomy. After some travelling scholarships to observatories in England, France and Germany, he was promoted to Assistant Professor in 1861. In 1869/1870, he was Professor of Physics at Stockholm Technical School. In 1873, he returned to Upsala as Professor of Mechanics and in 1874, became Professor of Physics there, replacing Angstrom. During this period, he received much criticism for favouring Angstrom's son, Knut, as a star pupil.

In 1886, he was elected an Honorary Fellow of the Royal Society of Edinburgh.

He retired in 1896 and died in Uppsala on 27 July 1905.

== Publications ==
- Spectral analysis of a New earth (1879)
- On the Brilliant Rays of Scandium (1880)
