= William Wallace Campbell =

American astronomer

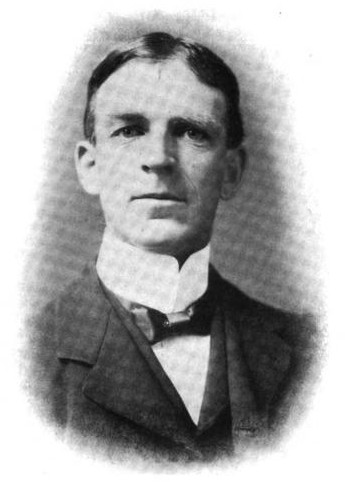
- Born: April 11, 1862; Hancock County, Ohio
- Died: June 14, 1938 (aged 76); San Francisco, California
- Education: University of Michigan (B.S.)
- Known for: Spectroscopy, University President
- Spouse: Elizabeth Ballard Thompson
- Children: Wallace, Douglas, Kenneth
- Awards: Lalande Medal, Gold Medal of the RAS, Draper Medal, Janssen Medal, Bruce Medal
- Scientific career
- Fields: Astronomy
- Workplaces: University of California, Berkeley

William Wallace Campbell (April 11, 1862 – June 14, 1938) was an American astronomer, and director of Lick Observatory from 1901 to 1930. He specialized in spectroscopy. He was the tenth president of the University of California from 1923 to 1930.

== Early life and education ==
He was born on a farm in Hancock County, Ohio, the son of Robert Wilson and Harriet Welsh Campbell. After a few years of local schooling he entered in 1882 the University of Michigan to study civil engineering, graduating Bachelor of Science in 1886. Whilst at university he developed his interest in astronomy when he read Simon Newcomb's Popular Astronomy.

== Career ==
Campbell at the Fourth Conference International Union for Cooperation in Solar Research at Mount Wilson Observatory, 1910.

After graduating, he was appointed Professor of Mathematics at the University of Colorado, but soon moved back to Michigan as an instructor in astronomy. In 1891 he was invited to work on spectroscopy at Lick Observatory in California. Campbell was a pioneer of astronomical spectroscopy and catalogued the radial velocities of stars. He was also recognized for his work in solar eclipse photography. In 1893 he discovered the Wolf–Rayet star HD 184738 (also known as Campbell's hydrogen envelope star). He was made a director of Lick Observatory from 1901 to 1930. He was nominated for the Nobel Prize in Physics by George Ellery Hale and Simon Newcomb in 1901.

In August 1914, Campbell and Erwin Freundlich of the Berlin Observatory were in Russia to photograph a solar eclipse, in an early attempt to test the validity of Albert Einstein's general theory of relativity. The outbreak of World War I (and in particular Germany's declaration of war against Russia) led to the seizure of Freundlich and his equipment in the Crimea by Russian officers. Campbell, from neutral America, was permitted to continue with his plans, but cloud cover obscured the eclipse. Campbell undertook another attempt to photograph a solar eclipse on June 8, 1918, in Goldendale, in Washington state.

But his precision photographic equipment had been retained in Russia four years earlier, and he had to improvise the needed apparatus from existing equipment at the Lick Observatory. The cameras he used were not adequate to provide the measurement accuracy needed to confirm the deflection of star light predicted by Einstein's theory. The equipment from Russia was finally shipped back on August 15, 1917, arriving August 21 the following year.

Confirmation of Einstein's theory came in 1919 in the wake of an expedition led by Arthur Eddington to photograph the eclipse of May 29, 1919. But some uncertainty remained, as well as scepticism fueled in part by anti-German sentiment in the wake of World War I. Final and uncontested confirmation is generally dated to Campbell's 1922 Lick Observatory expedition to Australia to photograph the solar eclipse. Campbell's report of the results state that the observations "furnish a value … which agrees exactly with Einstein's prediction."

He served as 10th President of the University of California from 1923 to 1930. He also served on the board of trustees for Science Service, now known as Society for Science & the Public, from 1923 to 1926. He served three terms as president of the Astronomical Society of the Pacific (in 1895, 1909 and 1918).

== Death ==
He committed suicide in California at the age of 76 by leaping to his death from a fourth-story window in San Francisco. He was mostly blind and suffering from bouts of aphasia. This was not only very frustrating to him, but he felt that it left him a burden to his family in terms of care and expense, according to notes he left behind at the time of his death. He married Elizabeth Ballard Thompson in 1892; they had three sons (one of them was WWI ace Douglas Campbell).

== Honors and awards ==
- Elected member of the United States National Academy of Sciences (1902)
- Lalande Medal of the French Academy of Sciences (1903)
- Elected Member of the American Philosophical Society (1903)
- Henry Draper Medal from the National Academy of Sciences (1906)
- Gold Medal of the Royal Astronomical Society (1906)
- Janssen Medal (1910)
- Elected member of the American Academy of Arts and Sciences (1911)
- Bruce Medal (1915)
- Foreign Member of the Royal Society of London (1918)
- Honorary Fellow of the Royal Society of Edinburgh (1920)
- Trustee of the Carnegie Institution (1929–1938)
- Crater Campbell on the Moon
- Crater on Mars
- Asteroid 2751 Campbell
- Campbell Hall on the University of California, Berkeley campus

== Crocker expeditions led by Campbell ==
Charles Frederick Crocker and William Henry Crocker financed numerous Lick-Crocker solar eclipse expeditions. Campbell led several of these expeditions.

- Solar eclipse of January 22, 1898, Jeur, Maharashtra, India
- Solar eclipse of May 28, 1900, Thomaston, Georgia
- Solar eclipse of August 30, 1905, Alhama, Spain
- Solar eclipse of January 3, 1908, Flint Island, Kiribati
- Solar eclipse of August 21, 1914, Brovary, Ukraine
- Solar eclipse of June 8, 1918, Goldendale, Washington
- Solar eclipse of September 21, 1922, Wallal, Australia

== Family ==
He married Elizabeth Ballard Thompson in 1892; they had three sons (one of them was WWI ace Douglas Campbell). Elizabeth contributed greatly to Campbell's work and played an important role in his success as a scientist. She adopted the role of hostess during his time as director of the Lick Observatory, also undertaking public relations work on behalf of the Observatory by writing letters to staff and potential donors and supporters of her husband's work.

Elizabeth organised many of the expeditions that Campbell led, arranging the expedition members travel, food, supplies and living quarters. She contributed to the work of the expeditions by undertaking astronomical spectroscopy, developing plates and extensively documented the expeditions including writing two manuscripts.

== See also ==
- List of nominees for the Nobel Prize in Physics

Academic offices
Preceded by David Prescott Barrows	President of the University of California; 1923–1930	Succeeded by Robert Gordon Sproul
