= Hvar 8 dag =

Hvar 8 dag was a Swedish illustrated weekly periodical with a mix of news, biographies, photographs, and other features. It was begun in 1899 and came to an end in 1932. It had a circulation of about 100,000 in the early 1910s.

The magazine (translating to "Every 8 days") was founded along the lines of the Danish Hver 8. Dag and was published initially from Gothenburg before moving to Stockholm. During World War I, it competed with other illustrated magazines like Vecko-Journalen. It contained as many as 500 biographies each year and was an advertising medium as well. Hjalmar Bratt served as the editor from 1901 to 1931 and was succeeded by Erik Ljungberger. The periodical came to an end in November 1932.
