= Campbell Hall (UC Berkeley) =

Academic building at the University of California, Berkeley

Coordinates: 37.873199°N 122.257063°W

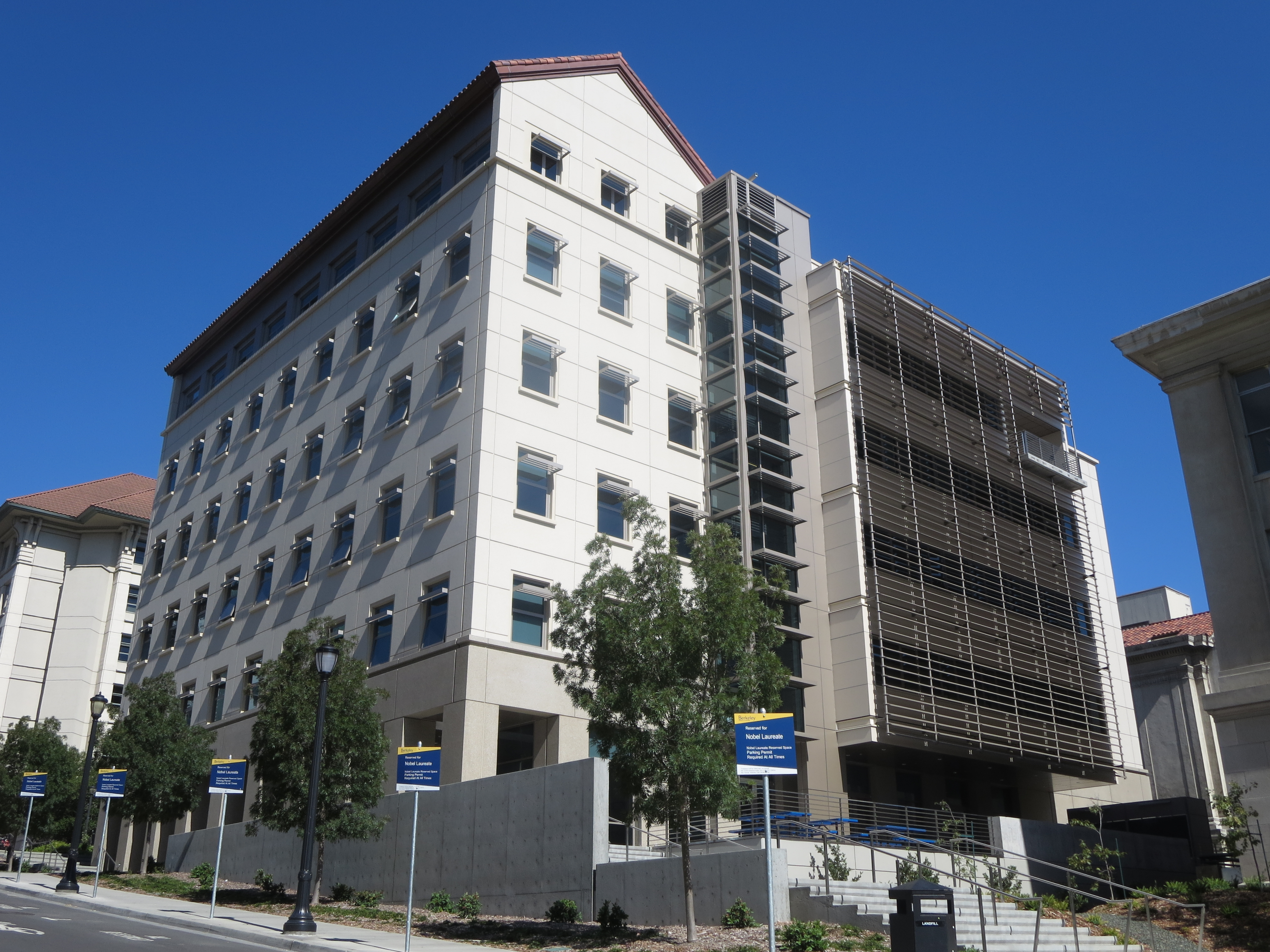
Campbell Hall

Campbell Hall is an academic building at the University of California, Berkeley. Housing Berkeley's astronomy department, it is linked by a bridge to the physics department in the building formerly named LeConte Hall. It is named after astronomer and former university president William Wallace Campbell.

== History ==
The original Campbell Hall was built from 1957 to 1959. Its design is a combination of modernist architecture, encouraged by a 1951 Campus Plan Study performed by the Office of Architects and Engineers, and the Beaux Arts/neo-classical design of earlier buildings. Campbell Hall was constructed to house the departments of astronomy, statistics, and mathematics, and the campus computer center. The Department of Astronomy has remained in the building since its completion, but the other programs mostly relocated to nearby buildings. Two small observatory domes were incorporated into Campbell Hall, but it was soon decided that it was not a useful location for astronomical observation because of weather and increasing urban light pollution. In addition to the astronomy and astrophysics programs, it currently houses various administrative offices for the College of Letters and Sciences, including the dean's office.

The original building was rated seismically poor and was demolished in 2012. Its replacement, opened in 2015, is part of a long-term campus project to modernize, expand, and better integrate the physics complex at UC Berkeley. The new building has 25% more square footage than the old one and houses laboratories, instructional spaces, academic and administrative offices, support spaces, a research laboratory called the Center for Integrated Precision and Quantum Measurement that is a high-stability, low-noise research facility, and a rooftop observatory. The new building is certified LEED Gold. Construction was funded in part with a grant from the U.S. Department of Commerce, NIST. The new building was designed by STUDIOS Architecture.
