= Phi Cygni =

Star in the constellation Cygnus

- Location of φ Cygni (circled)

Observation data Epoch J2000 Equinox ICRS
- Constellation: Cygnus
- Right ascension: 19^{h} 39^{m} 22.606^{s}
- Declination: +30° 09′ 11.957″
- Apparent magnitude (V): 4.70 (5.31 + 5.6)

Characteristics
- Evolutionary stage: red clump
- Spectral type: G8III + G8III
- U−B color index: +0.81
- B−V color index: +0.98

Astrometry
Radial velocity (R_{v})	+4.50 km/s
Proper motion (μ)	RA: +1.520 mas/yr Dec.: +35.883 mas/yr
Parallax (π)	12.7786±0.1207 mas
Distance	255 ± 2 ly (78.3 ± 0.7 pc)
Absolute magnitude (M_{V})	+0.12 (+0.77/+1.07)

Orbit
Period (P)	434.208 days
Semi-major axis (a)	26.9 mas″
Eccentricity (e)	0.5557
Inclination (i)	80.8°
Longitude of the node (Ω)	251°
Periastron epoch (T)	2451239.58
Argument of periastron (ω) (secondary)	209.41°
Semi-amplitude (K_{1}) (primary)	26.40 km/s
Semi-amplitude (K_{2}) (secondary)	27.22 km/s

Details

A
Mass	2.104±0.049 M_{☉}
Radius	7.46 (Note: Calculated, using the Stefan-Boltzmann law and the star's effective temperature and luminosity, with respect to the solar nominal effective temperature of 5,772 K: $$\sqrt{\biggl(\frac{5,772}{10^{3.71}}\biggr)^4 \cdot 10^{1.53}} = 7.46\ R_\odot.$$) R_{☉}
Luminosity	34.7+2.5 −2.3 L_{☉}
Temperature	5,130±120 K
Metallicity [Fe/H]	−0.11 dex
Rotational velocity (v sin i)	4.7 km/s
Age	479+58 −52 Myr

B
Mass	2.040±0.042 M_{☉}
Radius	7.04 (Note: Calculated, using the Stefan-Boltzmann law and the star's effective temperature and luminosity, with respect to the solar nominal effective temperature of 5,772 K: $$\sqrt{\biggl(\frac{5,772}{10^{3.70}}\biggr)^4 \cdot 10^{1.45}} = 7.04\ R_\odot.$$) R_{☉}
Luminosity	28±3 L_{☉}
Temperature	5,010 K
Rotational velocity (v sin i)	4.8 km/s
Age	562+69 −61 Myr

Other designations
- φ Cygni, 12 Cygni, BD+29°3684, GC 27203, HD 185734, HIP 96683, HR 7478, SAO 68637, WDS J19394+3009AB

Database references
SIMBAD	data

Phi Cygni is a binary star system in the northern constellation of Cygnus. Its name is a Bayer designation that is Latinized from φ Cygni and abbreviated Phi Cyg or φ Cyg. This system is faintly visible to the naked eye as a point of light with an apparent visual magnitude of 4.70. The annual parallax shift is 12.78 mas as measured from Earth, which yields a distance estimate of approximately 255 light years. It is moving further from the Sun with a radial velocity of +4.5 km/s.

φ Cygni is a double-lined spectroscopic binary system, which means that the absorption lines of both components are visible in the spectrum. The pair have an orbital period of 434.208 days, or 1.2 Earth years, a semimajor axis of 26.9 mas, and a high eccentricity of 0.56.

The two sets of spectral lines are almost identical and both stars are assigned a spectral type of K0III, meaning they have evolved into giants. They are considered to be red clump giants, stars that have begun core helium fusion and lie on the horizontal branch but because of their metallicity and the size of their hydrogen envelope they are found very close to the red giant branch. The two stars are assumed to have the same age, which would be around 650 million years.
