= Sofia Gisberg =

Swedish sculptor, textile artist and educator

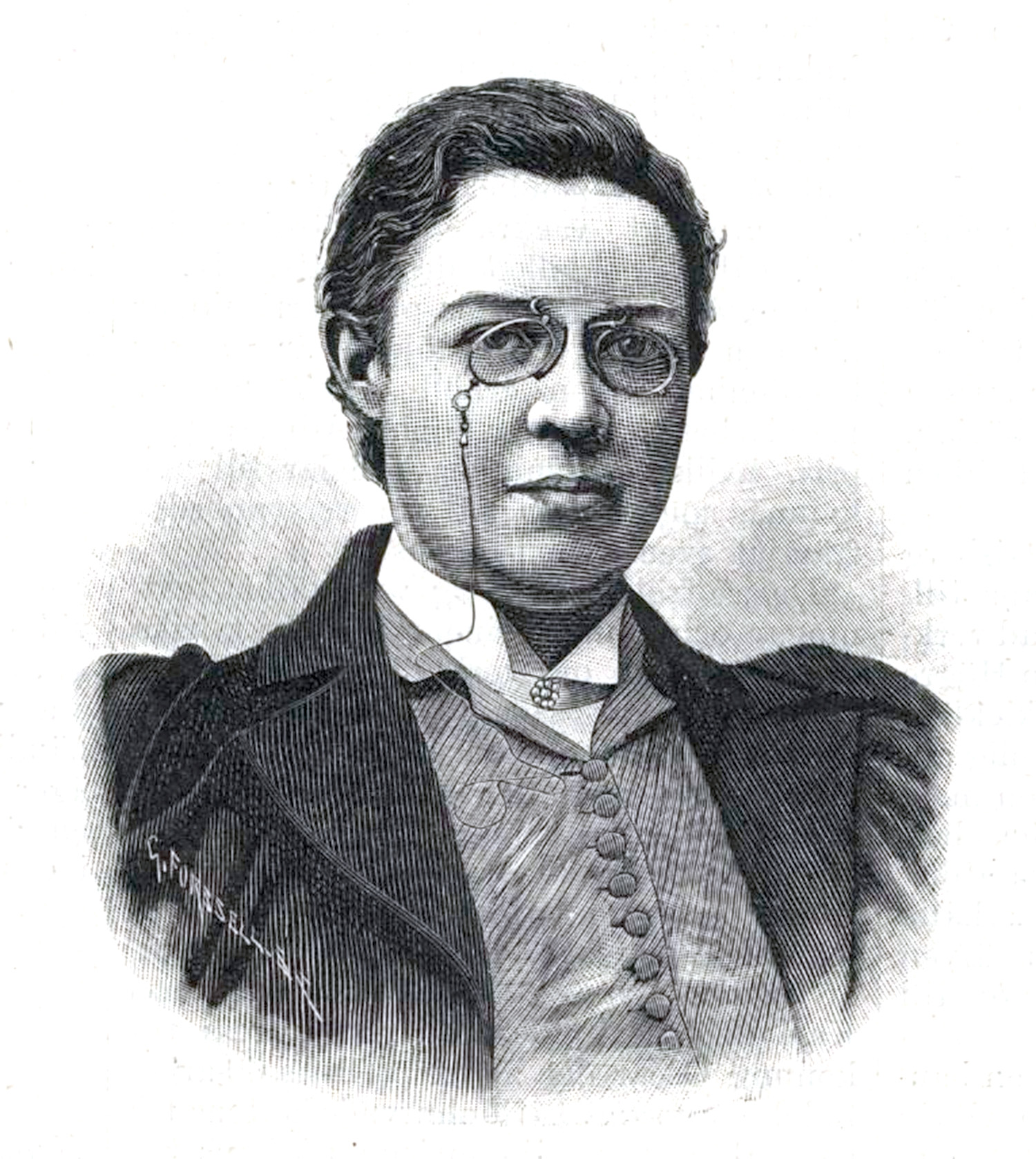
Sofia Gisberg (1893)

Sofia Gisberg (1854–1926) was a Swedish sculptor, textile artist and educator. From 1887, she taught at Tekniska Skolan, where she became director of women students until 1925, modernizing the teaching of textile arts. She is also remembered for designing the fountain in Vängåvan Park, Sundsvall, for her church textiles and for creating certificates for Nobel prizewinners. Examples of her work are in the collection of Stockholm's National Museum.

== Early life and education ==
Born on 16 November 1854 in Sundsvall, Sofia Gisberg was the daughter of the merchant Per Daniel Gisberg and his wife Abramina Elisabet née Taxberg. She was one of the family's eight children. Naturally talented at drawing, she trained at Sundvall's Lithographic Institute (Litografiska Anstalt) after which she worked as a print lithographer in Stockholm. While there, she followed courses in art at the Handicraft School which is now part of Konstfack. In 1879, she enrolled at the newly established women's section of the Technical School (Tekniska Skolan) where she was one of the first graduates. She also studied privately under the painter Kerstin Cardon. After a further three years in the school's Industrial Art department, in 1886 she graduated as a pattern creator.

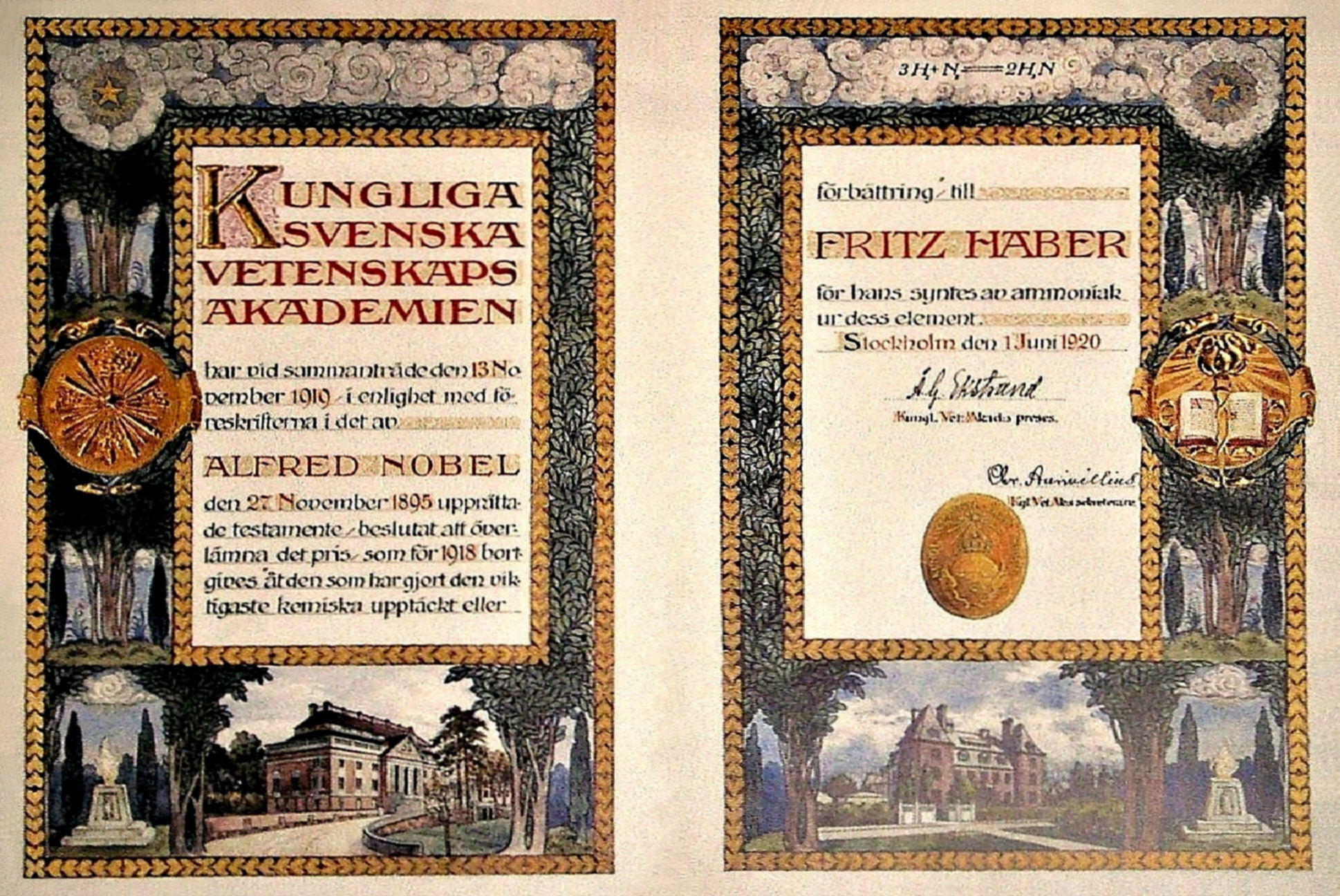
Nobel prize diploma for Fritz Haber designed by Sofia Gisberg

== Career ==
While still studying, Grisberg established her own company, working with new materials and developing new techniques and designs. As a result, in 1883 she was invited to design a shield in memory of King Gustav II Adolf for the National Museum in Stockholm. From 1884, in collaboration with the bookbinder F. Beck & Son she designed fine book covers incorporating leather mosaic techniques. In 1886, she received a travel scholarship which allowed her to develop her pattern creation skills in Germany and Austria. She was also invited to design a decorative fountain for her hometown Sundsvall which was unveiled in 1886.

In 1887, she was engaged as an instructor in lettering and calligraphy at the Technical School. In 1904, she was appointed head of the school's women's department, remaining in the post until 1925. Considered to be one of the school's most effective teachers, she modernized the approach by acquiring specialized looms and hiring skilled weavers. Thanks to her encouragement, generations of textile artists achieved success.

Gisberg also worked for the textile firm AB Licium where she designed the company's logo. Among her other creations are the textiles in various churches including those in the Gustav Adolf Church in Borås and the Gustavsberg and Hörnefors Churches, created between 1906 and 1908. In 1911, She designed those Ösmos Church in the Art Nouveau Style. Furthermore, she produced beautifully presented diplomas for Nobel prizewinners in chemistry and physics.

Sofia Gisberg died in Vaxholm on 3 January 1926.

== Awards ==
In 1901, Gisberg was awarded the Litteris et Artibus medal for her contributions to culture.
