= Campbell Hills =

Range of hills in Butte County, California, US

- Location within California

Highest point
- Elevation: 114 m (374 ft)

Geography
- Country: United States
- State: California
- District: Butte County
- Range coordinates: 39°32′3.589″N 121°36′45.899″W
- Topo map: USGS Oroville

The Campbell Hills are a low range of hills in southern Butte County, California. Some southern elevations overlook the Thermalito Afterbay, Oroville, and Oroville Airport.
