= Knut Ångström =

Swedish physicist (1857–1910)

Knut Johan Ångström
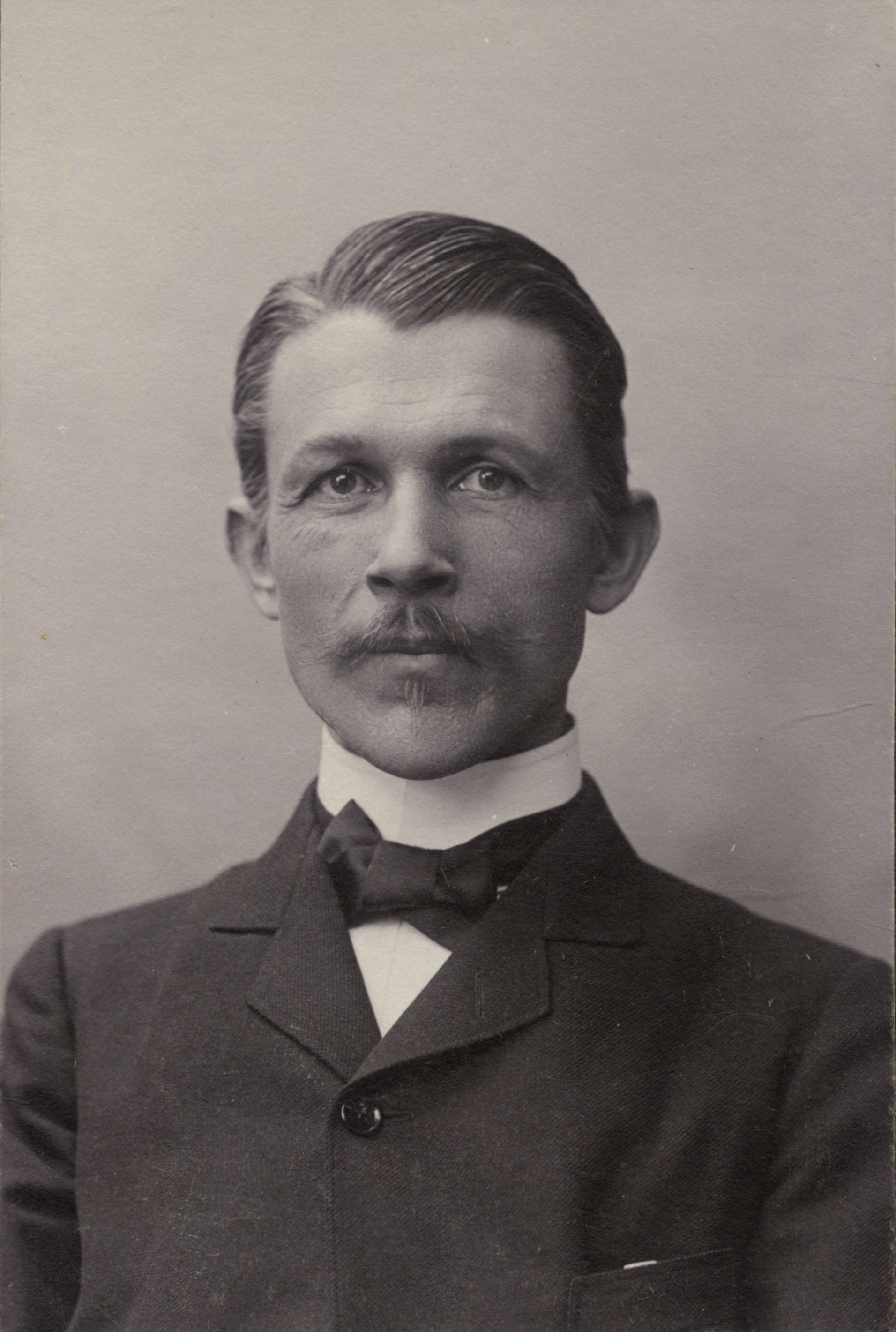
- Ångström ca 1878
- Born: 12 January 1857
- Died: 4 March 1910 (aged 53)
- Awards: Björkénska priset (1905)
- Scientific career
- Fields: Physics
- Workplaces: Uppsala University

Knut Johan Ångström (12 January 1857 – 4 March 1910) was a Swedish physicist. He was the son of physicist Anders Jonas Ångström and studied in Uppsala from 1877 to 1884, when he received his licentiat-degree, before going for a short time to the University of Strassburg (Strasbourg) to study with August Kundt. Coming back to Uppsala, he completed his doctoral degree and was appointed lecturer in physics at the new university college in Stockholm (now Stockholm University) in 1885. After a few years working there, he returned to Uppsala in 1891 and received the professorship of Physics in 1896.

He focused his research work on investigating the radiation of heat from the sun, terrestrial nocturnal emission and its absorption by the Earth's atmosphere, and to that end devised various delicate methods and instruments, including his electric compensation pyrheliometer, invented in 1893, apparatus for obtaining a photographic representation of the infra-red spectrum (1895) and pyrgeometer (abt. 1905).

In 1900, Herr J. Koch, laboratory assistant to Knut Ångström, did not observe any appreciable change in the absorption of infrared radiation by decreasing the concentration of CO_{2} up to a third of the initial amount. This result, in addition to the observation made a couple of years before that the superposition of the water vapour absorption bands, more abundant in the atmosphere, over those of CO_{2}, convinced some geologists for a time that calculations by Svante Arrhenius for CO_{2} warming were wrong; though subsequent work in following decades eventually partially vindicated Arrhenius. Arrhenius and Ångström were both qualitatively correct and both were quantitatively wrong.

The experiment, however, was careless seen from the current perspective with erroneous result but of a historical significance in the development of the theory of the greenhouse effect amplified by CO_{2}.

He was elected a member of the Royal Swedish Academy of Sciences in 1893.
