= Monika Ritsch-Marte =

Austrian physicist

- Born: 26 September 1961 (age 64); Höchst, Austria
- Education: University of Innsbruck; University of Waikato
- Known for: Quantum optics Microscopy
- Scientific career
- Fields: Physics
- Workplaces: Institute of Biomedical Physics; Medical University of Innsbruck
- Doctoral advisor: Daniel Frank Walls; Crispin Gardiner

Monika Ritsch-Marte (born 26 September 1961 in Höchst) is an Austrian physicist in the fields of biomedical optics, theoretical quantum optics and non-linear optics. She is a professor at the Medical University of Innsbruck and director of the Institute of Biomedical Physics.

== Life and education ==
Monika Ritsch-Marte was raised in the Austrian province of Vorarlberg, graduated in 1980 from grammar school in Bregenz, and earned a physics diploma from the University of Innsbruck in 1984. In 1985, she went to the University of Waikato in Hamilton, New Zealand, earning her PhD in 1988 under the supervision of Dan Walls and Crispin Gardiner with a thesis on generation and application of non-classical states of light, so-called squeezed states of light. She returned to Innsbruck for postdoctoral research in the group of Peter Zoller and then stayed at the University of Innsbruck for several years on a "Charlotte-Bühler Habilitationsprogramm" of the Austrian Science Fund. Some extended research visits abroad (Helsinki, JILA/Boulder, Konstanz) fall into this period, as well as half a year at the Universita degli Studi di Milano in the group of Luigi Lugiato supported by an APART grant from the Austrian Academy of Sciences. In 1995, Monika received her Habilitation in the field of Theoretical Physics as the University of Innsbruck. In 1998, she was appointed full professor in medical physics at the medical faculty of the University of Innsbruck, which meant a re-orientation towards biomedical optics (from this time on publishing under the name Ritsch-Marte). With the creation of the Medical University of Innsbruck as an independent university in 2004 she was appointed director of the Division of Biomedical Physics.

In 2007, she was elected the first female president of the Austrian Physical Society. For her achievements in the fields of optics and photonics, Ritsch-Marte was elected OSA Fellow in 2013 by the Optical Society of America. In 2014, she was elected as a corresponding member of the Austrian Academy of Sciences and in 2016 raised to full membership.

Ritsch-Marte is married to physicist Helmut Ritsch with whom she has two daughters.

== Work ==
Since moving into applied optics, Ritsch-Marte has contributed to the development and application of microscopic methods and optical tweezers. Her research group has pioneered new usages for spatial light modulators (SLM) in the form of liquid-crystal displays to optical microscopy. As a programmable Fourier filters, SLMs allow rapid switching between different microscopy modalities (bright field, dark field, phase contrast) without the need for changing any hardware components.

In the scope of the ERC Advanced Investigator Grant catchIT (= Coherently Advanced Tissue and Cell Holographic Imaging and Trapping) her group also developed methods of optical manipulation of ever larger particles, e.g. the optical "macro-tweezers" system, a large volume dual-beam mirror trap. This dual-beam approach is suitable to trap and guide swimming microorganisms such as Euglena without inducing any optical damage. For even larger particles, a combination of optical tweezers and an ultrasonic trap was developed.

An additional field of research in Ritsch-Marte's group is non-linear microscopy, e.g. chemically-selective coherent anti-Stokes Raman scattering (CARS), in particular they have developed a non-scanning (wide-field) CARS variant.

Ritsch-Marte and her colleague Stefan Bernet hold several patents (e.g. spiral-phase contrast microscopy or a diffractive Moiré lens with tunable refraction index).

Ritsch-Marte is also committed to the promotion of women in physics. Together with Claudia Draxl she chaired a working group of the Austrian Academy of Sciences which was dedicated to the promotion of women in physics. During her presidency of the Austrian Physical Society Monika Ritsch-Marte initiated the Lise-Meitner-Lectures, an event series organised yearly in co-operation with the German Physical Society consisting of public lectures by distinguished female physicists.

== Awards ==
- 2026 "ERC Advanced Grant" of the European Research Council for her research project SOFT
- 2023 Honorary membership of the Austrian Physical Society
- 2022 Emmy Noether Distinction for Women in Physics of the European Physical Society
- 2019 Elected to the Academy of Sciences Leopoldina.
- 2016 Full Member of the Austrian Academy of Sciences
- 2013 OSA Fellow of the Optical Society of America
- 2011 Science award of the province of Tyrol
- 2011 Grand Prix for the patent of a tunable Moiré lens at the South Corean Women's Invention Exposition KIWIE
- 2010 "ERC Advanced Grant" of the European Research Council (endowed with Euro 2.5 million) for her research project catchIT
- 2009 Kardinal Innitzer Prize for natural sciences Naturwissenschaften of the Archdiocese of Vienna
- 2008 SUPA Distinguished Visitor Award of the Scottish universities
- 2008 Science award of the province of Vorarlberg
- 1993 Ludwig Boltzmann Prize of the Austrian Physical Society (shared with H. Ritsch)
- 1992 Research award of the city of Innsbruck
- 1988 PhD award, University of Waikato, New Zealand
