= Anton Amann =

- Born: 20 June 1956; Bregenz, Austria
- Died: 6 January 2015 (aged 58); Innsbruck, Austria
- Education: M.S., ETH Zürich; Ph.D., ETH Zürich
- Occupation: Chemist
- Employer: Innsbruck Medical University
- Title: Professor

Anton Amann (20 June 1956 – 6 January 2015) was an Austrian chemist and Professor of chemistry at the Innsbruck Medical University. He worked in the area of physical chemistry, ECG analysis, and exhaled breath analysis.

Amann was the head of the Breath Research Institute of the Leopold-Franzens University of Innsbruck (formerly an Institute of the Austrian Academy of Science) and editor in chief of the Journal of Breath Research.

He authored more than 150 scientific articles. He died in Innsbruck in 2015.

== Career ==
After studying chemistry at the ETH Zürich, he continued with a PhD in Science. The title of his dissertation 1984 with Hans Primas and Norbert Straumann was Observable in der W*-algebraischen Quantenmechanik (observables in W*-algebraic quantum mechanics). In 1991 he earned Habilitation in Physical Chemistry at the ETH Zürich. From 1987 to 1995 he was a senior research associate at the Institute of Physical Chemistry at the ETH Zürich.

In 1995 he was awarded an APART grant from the Austrian Academy of Sciences and he also received an invitation to join Yale University as associate professor. In 1993 he was awarded with AECI Gold Medal by the South African Chemical Institute. In 2010, he received the Marie Curie Medal of the Polish Chemical Society.

From 2006 to 2009 he was the coordinator of the European Union Project BAMOD (lung carcinoma screening, project funding: 3 million euro). In 2005 he was chairman and organizer of the international conference Breath Analysis for Clinical Diagnosis and Therapeutic Monitoring., Innsbruck (Austria). In 2004 he was chairman and organizer of the international conference Breath Gas Analysis for Medical Diagnostics., Dornbirn (Austria).

Since 1997 he was a professor of chemistry at the Leopold-Franzens University of Innsbruck, and since 2004 at the Innsbruck Medical University.

== Selected publications ==
- with Julian King, Helin Koc, Karl Unterkofler, Pawel Mochalski, Alexander Kupferthaler, Gerald Teschl, Susanne Teschl, Hartmann Hinterhuber: Physiological modeling of isoprene dynamics in exhaled breath, J. Theoret. Biol. 267 (2010), 626–637, .
- with Julian King, Karl Unterkofler, Gerald Teschl, Susanne Teschl, Helin Koc, Hartmann Hinterhuber: A mathematical model for breath gas analysis of volatile organic compounds with special emphasis on acetone, J. Math. Biol. (2011), .
- with Klotz K, Niederklapfer T, Kupferthaler A, Werther T, Granegger M, Lederer W, Baubin M, Lingnau W: Reduction of CPR artifacts in the ventricular fibrillation ECG by coherent line removal, BioMedical Engineering OnLine 9, (2010) 2 .
- with Filipiak W, Sponring A, Filipiak A, Ager C, Schubert J, Miekisch W, Troppmair J: TD-GC-MS analysis of volatile metabolites of human lung cancer and normal cells in vitro, Cancer Epidemiology Biomarkers and Prevention 19 (2010) 182 - 195.
- with Julian King, Alexander Kupferthaler, Karl Unterkofler, Helin Koc, Susanne Teschl, Gerald Teschl, Wolfram Miekisch, Jochen Schubert, Hartmann Hinterhuber: Isoprene and acetone concentration profiles during exercise at an ergometer, J. Breath Research 3, (2009) 027006 (16 pp) .
- with K. Schwarz and W. Filipiak: Determining concentration patterns of volatile compounds in exhaled breath by PTR-MS, J. Breath Research 3, (2009) 027002 (15 pp) .
- with Bajtarevic A, Ager C, Pienz M, Klieber M, Schwarz K, Ligor M, Ligor T, Filipiak W, Denz H, Fiegl M, Hilbe W, Weiss W, Lukas P, Jamnig H, Hackl M, Haidenberger A, Buszewski B, Miekisch W, Schubert J: Noninvasive detection of lung cancer by analysis of exhaled breath, BMC Cancer 9 (2009) 348.
- with T. Werther, A. Klotz, G. Kracher, M. Baubin, HG. Feichtinger, H. Gilly: CPR artefact removal on ECG signals using Gabor multipliers, IEEE Trans Biomed. Eng. 65 (2009) 320 – 327 .
- with Ž. Krkošová, R. Kubinec, L. Soják: Temperature – programmed GC linear retention indices of all C4 – C30 monomethylalkanes on methylsilicone OV – 1 stationary phase. A contribution towards a better understanding of volatile organic compounds in exhaled breath, J. Chromatography A 1179 (2008) 59 – 68.
- with Robert Tratnig and Karl Unterkofler: Detecting Ventricular Fibrillation by Time-Delay Methods IEEE Trans. Biomed. Eng. 54 (2007) 174 – 177 .
- The Gestalt problem in quantum theory: Generation of molecular shape by the environment, Synthesis 97, (1993), 125 – 156.
- with Thomas Breuer, and Nicolaas P. Landsman: Robustness in quantum measurements J. Math. Phys. 34 (1993) 5441 – 5450.
- Ground states of a spin-boson model, Annals of Physics 208 (1991) 414 – 448.
- Jauch-Piron states in W*-algebraic quantum mechanics, J. Math. Phys. 28 (1987) 2384–2389 .
