= Helmut Ritsch =

Austrian physicist

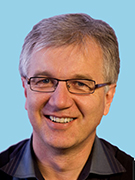
- Born: 12 March 1962 (age 64); Innsbruck, Austria
- Education: University of Innsbruck
- Known for: Cavity QED; Monte Carlo wave function (MCWF) method
- Spouse: Monika Ritsch-Marte
- Awards: Ludwig Boltzmann Prize (1993); Erwin Schrödinger Prize (2019)
- Scientific career
- Fields: Physics; Quantum mechanics; Quantum optics
- Workplaces: University of Innsbruck; University of Konstanz; JILA, University of Colorado (Boulder); University of Milan
- Thesis: Atomic Dynamics in Classical Stochastic and Quantum Light Fields
- Doctoral advisor: Peter Zoller

Helmut Ritsch (German: [ˈHɛlmuːt ʀɪtʃ]; born 12 March 1962 in Innsbruck) is an Austrian quantum physicist and a professor of theoretical physics at the University of Innsbruck.

Helmut Ritsch's research concerns the fundamental aspects and applications of quantum optics and cavity quantum electrodynamics. Together with his theory group, he focuses on cavity cooling, self-organization, quantum thermodynamics, light forces, superradiant lasing and quantum metrology. His significant contributions in those fields have been honoured with prestigious awards and prizes, as the Ludwig Boltzmann Prize (1993) of the Austrian Physical Society and the Erwin Schrödinger Prize (2019) of the Austrian Academy of Sciences.

== Life and career ==
Ritsch grew up in Stubaital in the neighbourhood of Innsbruck. He graduated in 1980 from Akademischen Gymnasium in Innsbruck and studied physics at the University of Innsbruck, where he finished his diploma study in 1985 with a thesis about synchrotron radiation. He began his doctoral studies under Peter Zoller, which he finished in 1989 with the dissertation "Atomic Dynamics in Classical Stochastic and Quantum Light Fields". Afterwards he worked as a postdoc in Innsbruck, Konstanz, Milan, Boulder and Munich. In 1993 he was habilitated at the University of Innsbruck (venia docendi in theoretical physics). In 1996/97 Ritsch did research at the University of Milan as part of a Marie Skłodowska-Curie project.

Beginning in 1998, he was associate professor, and since 2011 Helmut Ritsch is professor at the Institute for Theoretical Physics at the University of Innsbruck. He was the head of the institute from 2009 until 2013 and from 2017 until 2021.

Helmut Ritsch is married to the physicist Monika Ritsch-Marte, they have two daughters.

== Research ==
=== Cavity QED ===
Helmut Ritsch has made significant contributions to the field of cavity quantum electrodynamics (QED), in particular to many-body cavity QED. Along his colleagues, he has developed the notion of self-organization of atoms interacting strongly with quantized radiation fields of high-Q cavities, as a manifestation of the Dicke superradiant phase transition. This phenomenon has been observed in many experiments, ranging from Bose-Einstein condensates to non-interacting and strongly interacting Fermi gases. The atomic self-organization in cavities is currently an active field of research, with the prospect to address some of the most challenging, open questions in nonequilibrium many-body physics in a controlled way.

=== Monte Carlo wave function (MCWF) method ===
Monte Carlo wave function method, also known as quantum jump method, is a computational tool used in dissipative systems to approximate the density matrix of a quantum system. The method was developed in 1992 independently by Dum, Zoller and Ritsch and Dalibard, Castin and Mølmer.

=== QuantumOptics.jl ===
QuantumOptics.jl is a numerical framework written in the Julia that facilitates simulations of various kinds of open quantum systems. It is inspired by the Quantum Optics Toolbox for MATLAB and the Python framework QuTiP. QuantumOptics.jl is being developed in Helmut Ritsch's CQED group at the Institute for Theoretical Physics of the University of Innsbruck since 2017, with the 1.0 version being released in July 2021. QuantumOptics.jl remains open-source and is hosted on GitHub. There are several Add-Ons related to and/or dependent on QuantumOptics.jl. For example, QuantumCumulants.jl is a package for the symbolic derivation of mean-field equations for quantum mechanical operators in Julia.

=== Dipole-Dipole interactions ===
A significant part of his research also involves the investigation of collective effects of atoms with light-induced interactions, including the emergence of superadiance and subradiance in long-range interacting quantum emitters with dipole-dipole interactions.

== Honours and awards ==
- 2019 Erwin Schrödinger Prize of the Austrian Academy of Sciences for his outstanding research achievements in the field of quantum optics, in particular for his fundamental contributions to the theoretical understanding of light–matter interaction and cavity quantum electrodynamics (CQED).
- 2019 JILA visiting fellow award
- 2008 Scottish Universities Physics Alliance (SUPA) Distinguished Visitor Award, Glasgow.
- 2004 Dr. Otto Seibert Wissenschafts-Förderungs-Preis.
- 1993 Ludwig Boltzmann Prize of the Austrian Physical Society (jointly with M. Ritsch-Marte).
- 1992 Research award of the city of Innsbruck.
