= Teschl =

Teschl is a surname. Notable people with the surname include:

- Gerald Teschl (born 1970), Austrian mathematician, married to Susanne
- Michael Teschl (born 1971), Danish singer, composer and writer
- Susanne Teschl (born 1970), Austrian mathematician, married to Gerald
