= Denz =

Denz is a surname. Notable people with the surname include:

- Cornelia Denz (born 1963), German physicist
- Nico Denz (born 1994), German racing cyclist
- Peter Denz (born 1940), German engineer, inventor, entrepreneur and Oscar winner
- Silvio Denz (born 1956 ), Swiss entrepreneur and winemaker
