= Fritz Gesztesy =

Austrian-American mathematical physicist

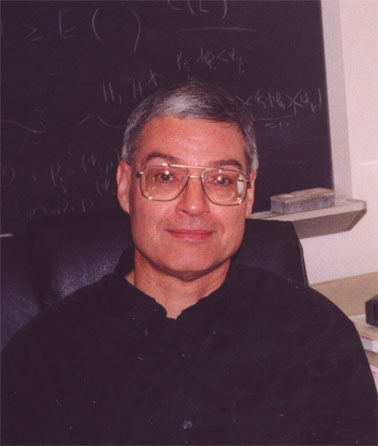
- Born: 5 November 1953 (age 72); Leibnitz, Austria
- Education: University of Graz
- Scientific career
- Fields: Mathematics, Mathematical Physics
- Workplaces: University of Graz, University of Missouri, Baylor University
- Doctoral advisor: Heimo Latal and Ludwig Streit
- Notable students: Gerald Teschl

Friedrich "Fritz" Gesztesy (born 5 November 1953 in Austria) is a well-known Austrian-American mathematical physicist and Professor of Mathematics at Baylor University, known for his important contributions in spectral theory, functional analysis, nonrelativistic quantum mechanics (particularly, Schrödinger operators), ordinary and partial differential operators, and completely integrable systems (soliton equations). He has authored more than 300 publications on mathematics and physics.

== Career ==
After studying physics at the University of Graz, he continued with his PhD in theoretical physics. The title of his dissertation 1976 with Heimo Latal and Ludwig Streit was Renormalization, Nelson's symmetry and energy densities in a field theory with quadratic interaction. After working at the Institut for Theoretical Physics of the University of Graz (1977–82) and several stays abroad at the Bielefeld University (Alexander von Humboldt Scholarship 1980–81 and 1983–84) and at the California Institute of Technology (Max Kade Scholarship 1987–88) he was appointed to Professor at the University of Missouri in 1988 and as Houchins Distinguished Professor in 2002. In 2016 he joined the faculty of Baylor University as Storm Professor of Mathematics.

In 1983 he got the Austrian Theodor Körner Award in Natural Sciences, in 1987 the Ludwig Boltzmann Prize of the Austrian Physical Society. In 2002 he was elected to the Royal Norwegian Society of Sciences and Letters. In 2013 he became a Fellow of the American Mathematical Society. 2022 he received an honorary doctorate from the Graz University of Technology.

Among his students are Gerald Teschl, Karl Unterkofler , Selim Sukhtaiev , and Maxim Zinchenko .

== Selected publications ==
- with Sergio Albeverio, Raphael Høegh-Krohn and Helge Holden: " Solvable Models in Quantum Mechanics", 2nd edition, AMS-Chelsea Series, Amer. Math. Soc., 2005
- with Helge Holden: Soliton Equations and their Algebro-Geometric Solutions, Bd.1 (1+1 dimensional continuous models), Cambridge Studies in Advanced Mathematics Bd.79, Cambridge University Press 2003
- with Helge Holden, Johanna Michor, and Gerald Teschl: Soliton Equations and their Algebro-Geometric Solutions, Bd.2 (1+1 dimensional discrete models), Cambridge Studies in Advanced Mathematics Bd.114, Cambridge University Press 2008
- with Barry Simon, The xi function, Acta Math. 176 (1996), 49–71
- with Rudi Weikard, Picard potentials and Hill's equation on a torus, Acta Math. 176 (1996), 73–107
- with Rudi Weikard, A characterization of all elliptic algebro-geometric solutions of the AKNS hierarchy, Acta Math. 181 (1998), 63–108
- with Barry Simon, A new approach to inverse spectral theory. II. General real potentials and the connection to the spectral measure, Ann. of Math. 2 152 (2000), 593–643

== Literature ==
- Spectral Analysis, Differential Equations and Mathematical Physics: A Festschrift in Honor of Fritz Gesztesy's 60th Birthday, H. Holden, B. Simon and G. Teschl (eds), Proceedings of Symposia in Pure Mathematics 87, Amer. Math. Soc., 2013 (Preface)
