= Sonja W. Scholz =

Austrian neurologist and neurogeneticist

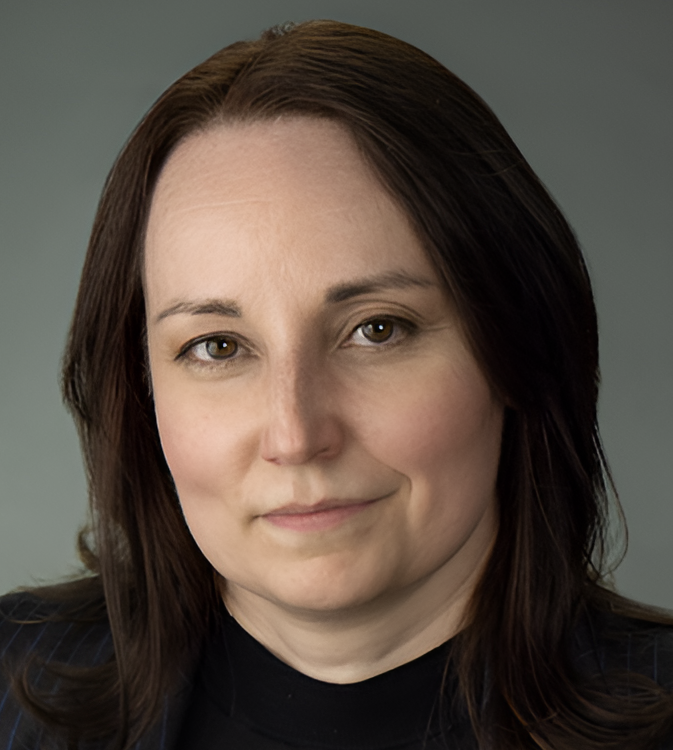
- Education: Medical University of Innsbruck; University College London
- Scientific career
- Fields: Neurology, neurogenetics
- Workplaces: National Institutes of Health

Sonja W. Scholz is an Austrian neurologist and neurogeneticist. She is a Senior Investigator and chief of the Neurodegenerative Diseases Research Section at the National Institute of Neurological Disorders and Stroke, where her laboratory focuses on the molecular genetics of neurodegenerative diseases and dementias.

== Career ==
Scholz received a medical degree from the Medical University of Innsbruck and a Ph.D. from University College London (2010). From 2005 to 2009, she was a post-doctoral fellow at the Laboratory of Neurogenetics at National Institute on Aging. She completed a postdoctoral fellowship in neuroscience at Georgetown University from 2009 to 2011. After completing an internship and adult neurology residency at Johns Hopkins Hospital from 2011 to 2015, she joined NINDS in 2015, completed a fellowship in neurodegeneration, and became a Lasker Clinical Research Tenure Track Investigator in 2018. In 2024, she was tenured as a Senior Investigator. She is also an adjunct Professor of Neurology at Johns Hopkins University.

== Research ==
Scholz's research integrates large-scale genomic and multi-omic approaches to define the genetic architecture and biological mechanisms underlying neurodegenerative diseases, such as dementia with Lewy bodies, multiple system atrophy, progressive supranuclear palsy, and frontotemporal dementia. Her work in neurogenetics has contributed to a better understanding of diseases such as Alzheimer's disease and Parkinson's disease. Her group collaborates widely and leverages NIH Intramural resources to accelerate translational discovery.

== Awards and honors ==
- 2025 — Presidential Early Career Award for Scientists and Engineers (PECASE); award conferred by the White House on January 14, 2025.
- 2020 — Soriano Prize and Lectureship; awarded by the American Neurological Association
- 2019 — Norman Geschwind Award in Behavioral Neurology; awarded by the American Academy of Neurology.
