= Gerald Teschl =

Austrian mathematician (born 1970)

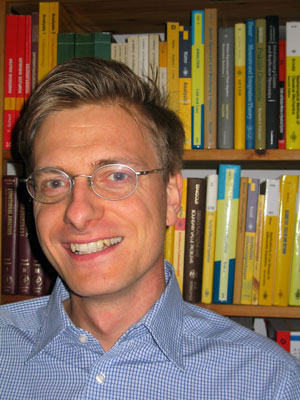
- Born: 12 May 1970 (age 56); Graz, Austria
- Education: University of Missouri
- Scientific career
- Fields: Mathematics, Mathematical physics
- Workplaces: RWTH Aachen, University of Vienna
- Doctoral advisor: Fritz Gesztesy

Gerald Teschl (born 12 May 1970 in Graz) is an Austrian mathematical physicist and professor of mathematics. He works in the area of mathematical physics; in particular direct and inverse spectral theory with application to completely integrable partial differential equations (soliton equations).

== Career ==
After studying physics at the Graz University of Technology (diploma thesis 1993), he continued with a PhD in mathematics at the University of Missouri. The title of his thesis supervised by Fritz Gesztesy was Spectral Theory for Jacobi Operators (1995). After a postdoctoral position at the Rheinisch-Westfälischen Technische Hochschule Aachen (1996/97), he moved to Vienna, where he received his Habilitation at the University of Vienna in May 1998. Since then he has been a professor of mathematics there.

In 1997 he received the Ludwig Boltzmann Prize from the Austrian Physical Society, 1999 the Prize of the Austrian Mathematical Society. In 2006 he was awarded with the prestigious START-Preis by the Austrian Science Fund (FWF). In 2011 he became a member of the Austrian Academy of Sciences (ÖAW).

His most important contributions are to the fields of Sturm–Liouville theory, Jacobi operators and the Toda lattice. He also works in biomathematics, in particular in the novel area of breath gas analysis, and has written a successful undergraduate textbook (Mathematics for Computer Science, in German) with his wife Susanne Teschl.

== Selected publications ==
- Ordinary Differential Equations and Dynamical Systems, American Mathematical Society, Graduate Studies in Mathematics, Volume 140, 2012, ISBN 978-0-8218-8328-0
- with Julian King, Helin Koc, Karl Unterkofler, Pawel Mochalski, Alexander Kupferthaler, Susanne Teschl, Hartmann Hinterhuber, Anton Amann: Physiological modeling of isoprene dynamics in exhaled breath, J. Theoret. Biol. 267 (2010), 626–637.
- Mathematical Methods in Quantum Mechanics with Applications to Schrödinger Operators, American Mathematical Society, Graduate Studies in Mathematics, Volume 99, 2009, ISBN 978-0-8218-4660-5
- with Susanne Teschl: Mathematik für Informatiker, 2 Bände, Springer Verlag, Bd. 1 (Diskrete Mathematik und Lineare Algebra), 3. Auflage 2008, ISBN 978-3-540-77431-0, Bd. 2 (Analysis und Statistik), 2. Auflage 2007, ISBN 978-3-540-72451-3
- with Fritz Gesztesy, Helge Holden and Johanna Michor: Soliton Equations and their Algebro-Geometric Solutions, Volume 2 (1+1 dimensional discrete models), Cambridge Studies in Advanced Mathematics Bd.114, Cambridge University Press 2008, ISBN 978-0-521-75308-1
- with Spyridon Kamvissis: Stability of periodic soliton equations under short range perturbations, Phys. Lett. A 364 (2007), 480–483.
- Jacobi Operators and Completely Integrable Nonlinear Lattices, American Mathematical Society, Mathematical Surveys and Monographs, Volume 72, 2000, ISBN 0-8218-1940-2
- with Fritz Gesztesy and Barry Simon: Zeros of the Wronskian and renormalized oscillation theory, Am. J. Math. 118 (1996) 571–594. doi:10.1353/ajm.1996.0024
