= Maria Skłodowska-Curie Medal =

Polish international chemistry prize

- Awarded for: Significant contributions in the field of chemistry
- Country: Poland
- Presented by: Polish Chemical Society
- First award: 1996
- Website: ptchem.pl/pl/honors/winners-of-the-medals-and-ptchem-awards

The Maria Skłodowska-Curie Medal (Medal Marii Skłodowskiej-Curie) is a Polish annual science award conferred by the Polish Chemical Society (Polish: Polskie Towarzystwo Chemiczne, PTCHem) to scientists working permanently abroad for contributions in the field of chemistry. It was named in honour of Polish physicist Maria Skłodowska-Curie (English: Marie Curie) and first awarded in 1996.

The winner receives a bronze medal depicting Marie Curie and on the reverse the Latin inscription Quo Magis Veritas Propagatur as well as the PTCHem logo, year and the name of the laureate. Four laureates of the medal have also been awarded the Nobel Prize in Chemistry: Roald Hoffmann (1981), Jean Marie Lehn (1987), Ada Yonath (2009) and Ben Feringa (2016).

== Laureates ==
The winners of the award so far have been:

Year	Laureate(s)	Image	Country^{[a]}	Institution(s)	Ref.
2022	Jean Marie Lehn	Jean-Marie Lehn	France	University of Strasbourg	
2021	Volodymyr M. Gun’ko		Ukraine	Chuiko Institute of Surface Chemistry, National Academy of Science of Ukraine	
2020	Karl Anker Jørgensen		Denmark	Aarhus University	
2019	Roald Hoffmann	Roald Hoffmann	United States	Cornell University	
2018	Jacek Klinowski	Jacek Klinowski	United Kingdom	University of Cambridge	
2017	Krzysztof Palczewski	Krzysztof Palczewski	United States	University of California, Irvine	
2016	Mietek Jaroniec		United States	Kent State University	
2015	Janusz Pawliszyn	Janusz Pawliszyn	Canada	University of Waterloo	
2014	John Joule	John Joule	United Kingdom	University of Manchester	
2013	Ben Feringa	Ben Feringa	Netherlands	University of Groningen	
2012	Krzysztof Matyjaszewski	Krzysztof Matyjaszewski	United States	Carnegie Mellon University	
2011	Roland Boese		Germany	University of Duisburg-Essen	
2011	Nicole J. Moreau		France	University of Paris	
2011	Ada Yonath	Ada Yonath	Israel	Hebrew University of Jerusalem	
2010	Anton Amann		Austria	Innsbruck Medical University	
2007	Jerzy Leszczyński		United States	Jackson State University	
2005	Tadeusz Maliński		United States	Ohio University	
2003	Ivar Olovsson		Sweden	Uppsala University	
2002	Vilim Simanek		Czech Republic	Palacký University Olomouc	
2001	Gerald Djega-Mariadassou		France	Pierre and Marie Curie University	
2001	Józef Hurwic	Józef Hurwic	France	Aix-Marseille University	
2000	Gerard Descotes		France	University of Lyon	
2000	Christian Reichardt	Christian Reichardt	Germany	University of Marburg	
1997	Philip Kocienski		United Kingdom	University of Leeds	
1996	Lodovico R. di Sanseverino		Italy	University of Bologna	

== Notes ==
- ^{a} Sites of the work places of the Laureates at the time of the award.

== See also ==
- Prize of the Foundation for Polish Science
- Marian Smoluchowski Medal
- Kołos Medal
