= Barbara Kraus =

Austrian physicist

Barbara Kraus (born 26 December 1975) is an Austrian physicist specializing in quantum information, quantum entanglement, and quantum key distribution. She is a University Professor at the TUM School of Natural Sciences at the Technical University of Munich.

== Education and career ==
Kraus is originally from Innsbruck. She studied mathematics and physics at the University of Innsbruck, earning diplomas in mathematics and physics. She completed her PhD in physics under the supervision of Ignacio Cirac in 2003. After postdoctoral research at the Max Planck Institute of Quantum Optics, the University of Geneva, and the University of Innsbruck, she became an assistant professor in Innsbruck in 2010, and earned her habilitation there in 2012. She became full professor in 2020. In 2023 she was appointed professor of Quantum Algorithms and Applications at the Technical University of Munich.

== Research ==
Kraus is best known for her work in quantum information and especially in entanglement theory. Together with her coworkers she developed criteria to decide whether a quantum state is separable or entangled and showed how to construct optimal entanglement witnesses and studied the creation of entanglement by unitary quantum gates and dissipative processes. In 2010 she showed how to decide whether two pure quantum states of a many-particle system are equivalent to each other in terms of entanglement. More recently she introduced the notion of "maximally entangled sets" as a new concept generalizing maximally entangled states to the case of considering entanglement between more than two systems (multipartite entanglement). In the field of quantum cryptography, she studied the security of key-distribution protocols and the achievable secret-key rates. Among other results, she and her collaborators Renato Renner and Nicolas Gisin gave an influential information-theoretic security proof for the security of a quantum key distribution protocol.

== Recognition ==
Kraus won a Start-Preis from the Austrian Science Fund in 2010. She was the 2011 winner of the Ludwig Boltzmann Prize of the Austrian Physical Society, and the 2013 winner of the Lieben Prize of the Austrian Academy of Sciences for her work on many-body entanglement. She became a member of the Young Academy of the Austrian Academy of Sciences in 2014.
