= Halina Rubinsztein-Dunlop =

Polish born Australian physicist

- Born: Halina Rubinsztein; 1950; Poland
- Other name: Halina Rubinsztein
- Education: University of Gothenburg
- Awards: Order of Australia (2018)
- Scientific career
- Fields: Optical Tweezers, Laser Physics, Biophysics, Quantum Optics
- Workplaces: University of Queensland
- Thesis: Atomic-beam magnetic resonance investigations of refractory elements and metastable states of lead
- Doctoral students: Peter Barker
- Website: https://people.smp.uq.edu.au/HalinaRubinsztein-Dunlop/

Halina Rubinsztein-Dunlop (née Rubinsztein; born 1950) AO FAA is an Australian physicist. She is a professor of physics at the University of Queensland and an Officer of the Order of Australia. She has led pioneering research in atom optics, laser micro-manipulation using optical tweezers, laser enhanced ionisation spectroscopy, biophysics and quantum physics.

== Early life ==
Halina Rubinsztein (later Rubinsztein-Dunlop) was born in Poland to a Jewish family. She emigrated to Sweden where she obtained her BSc and PhD degree from the University of Gothenburg. Rubinsztein-Dunlop was encouraged to be curious about the world by her mother, also a physicist. In an interview for SPIE, she credits her mother's guidance and enthusiasm for science: "she taught me to persist and to be inquisitive and to want to understand, and also - and I think this is what was important - she showed me that women can do it. It was infectious," She moved to Australia in 1989, shortly after her marriage to engineer Gordon Dunlop.

== Career ==
Rubinsztein-Dunlop completed her PhD titled Atomic-beam magnetic resonance investigations of refractory elements and metastable states of lead at the University of Gothenburg in 1978. After moving to Australia in 1989, Rubinsztein-Dunlop joined the Department of Physics at the University of Queensland where she formed a research group studying laser physics. In 1995, she helped establish a Science in Action program that was used for outreach in educational programs for schools.

Rubinsztein-Dunlop was appointed Professor of Physics in 2000. She held the role of Head of the Department of Physics as well as the Head of the School of Mathematics and Physics at the University of Queensland from 2006 to 2013. She is the Director of the Quantum Science Laboratory and leads one of the scientific programs of the Australian Research Council Centre of Excellence for Engineered Quantum Systems. In 2011 she was a guest editor for the Journal of Optics on a special issue about optical tweezers, published by the Institute of Physics.

In 2016 Rubinsztein-Dunlop was made Fellow of the Australian Academy of Science. She was appointed an Officer of the Order of Australia (AO) in the Queen's 2018 Birthday Honours List for "distinguished service to laser physics and nano-optics as a researcher, mentor and academic, to the promotion of educational programs, and to women in science".

During the 2018 international scientific conference SPIE, the Optical Trapping and Optical Micromanipulation XV programme held a special session honouring Halina Rubinsztein-Dunlop.

An Australian Museum Eureka Prize was awarded to the University of Queensland Optical Physics in Neuroscience team, consisting of Rubinsztein-Dunlop alongside Ethan Scott and Itia Favre-Bulle for their study of the brain and how it detects gravity and motion. The full title of the award is the 2018 UNSW Eureka Prize for Excellence in Interdisciplinary Scientific Research.

== Research ==
Rubinsztein-Dunlop conducts research that harnesses the power of optics and lasers to explore quantum and biological phenomena. She has published over 200 works in journals and books and has also been featured on radio and television. Rubinsztein-Dunlop is considered an originator of laser enhanced ionisation spectroscopy.

=== Quantum Optics ===
Although her PhD involved looking at the hyperfine structure of atoms, she notes that her research was "not [using] the tiniest of the tiniest...I never worked with quarks or gluons...". She was however, fascinated by being able to interrogate nature at small level using light. Her team successfully demonstrated dynamical tunnelling in a Bose Einstein Condensate (BEC) using a modulated standing wave. Rubinzstein-Dunlop's team has also observed dynamical tunnelling in quantum chaotic systems. In 2016, Rubinsztein-Dunlop, along with Tyler Neely and Guillaume Gauthier, imprinted images of Einstein and Indian physicist Satyendra Nath Bose on a super-cold microscopic fluid, demonstrating a physics state predicted by Einstein and Bose in 1925 but first achieved in 1995. The image is approximately 0.1mm by 0.1mm in size but with a surface 100 million times colder than interstellar space.

=== Optical Micro-manipulation ===
Rubinsztein-Dunlop's research in laser micro-manipulation involves the use of optical tweezers to trap objects in three dimensions and exert optical forces onto them. As she explains in her own words, "Optical tweezers act like our normal tweezers, but instead of using mechanical tweezers you are just using laser light that's highly focused: you grab something, and apply force to it to move it. What is beautiful about it is that it's a quantitative method: you can evaluate how far you move an entity and what sort of force you're applying, so you can start interrogating complex biological or solid state systems in a very precise way." Her group exploits the ability to rotate very small objects using exotic laser modes such as Laguerre Gauss beams, as for example was published in 2014 for a micron size donut shaped rotor. In a seminal paper published in 1995 and titled "Direct Observation of Transfer of Angular Momentum to Absorptive Particles from a Laser Beam with a Phase Singularity", Rubinsztein-Dunlop's group experimentally showed the spinning of absorptive particles trapped in a singularity beam where the spin direction was controlled based on the sign of the singularity.

=== Biophysics ===
Rubinsztein-Dunlop also conducts work in the field of biophysics, notably a study on vertigo and understanding the body's balance system. At the heart of this research is otoliths which are little stones in the ears. By manipulating the otoliths in zebrafish and moving them around, reactions were observed such as how the "fish moves its tail to try to compensate for the interaction with its balance system". The 2018 UNSW Eureka Prize for Excellence in Interdisciplinary Scientific Research was awarded to Rubinsztein-Dunlop and the University of Queensland Optical Physics in Neuroscience team based on research using optical trapping and novel microscopes that image how brain circuits function to process motion together with other senses. She has also conducted research using laser micro-manipulation to examine red blood cells to see how long blood can be stored before being used safely; the older the cell, the more likely the elasticity changes. Rubinsztein-Dunlop uses optical tweezers to grab the blood cell at both ends and then stretches the cell from one end whilst the other is fixed to measure how much it can stretch.

== Awards ==
- 2003 AIP Women in Physics lecturer
- 2011 Fellow of SPIE, the international society for optics and photonics
- 2012 Fellow of The Optical Society
- 2016 Fellow of the Australian Academy of Science
- 2018 Officer of the Order of Australia
- 2018 UNSW Eureka Prize for Excellence in Interdisciplinary Scientific Research
- 2019 Lise Meitner Lectures "Sculpted light in nano- and microsystems"
- 2021 The Optical Society C.E.K. Mees Medal "For pioneering innovations in the transfer of optical angular momentum to particles, using sculpted light for laser manipulation on atomic, nano- and microscales to generate fundamental insight and provide powerful probes to biomedicine."
- 2025 SPIE Gold Medal "For innovations in the transfer of optical angular momentum to matter, using sculpted light for laser manipulation on atomic, nano- and microscales, and providing a powerful probe to biomedicine."

== Memberships ==
- Rubinsztein-Dunlop is a member of the Scientific Advisory Board of NTT Basic Research Laboratories, Japan.
- She is a member of the Editorial Board of the Journal of Biophotonics.
- She is a member of the Advisory Board of the Beckmann Laser Institute.
- In 2012, Rubinsztein-Dunlop became a Fellow of The Optical Society for pioneering contributions in nano and micro laser manipulation in the fields of optical tweezers and atom optics with applications to biophotonics.
- SPIE roles: Board of Directors, Diversity and Inclusion Ad Hoc Committee, Fellows Committee, Publications Committee, Strategic Planning Committee, Symposia Committee, Symposium Chair, Conference Program Committee, Conference Chair, Symposium Committee

== Personal life ==
She is married to the engineer, Gordon Dunlop.
