= Wolfgang Fleischhacker =

Austrian psychiatrist and academic

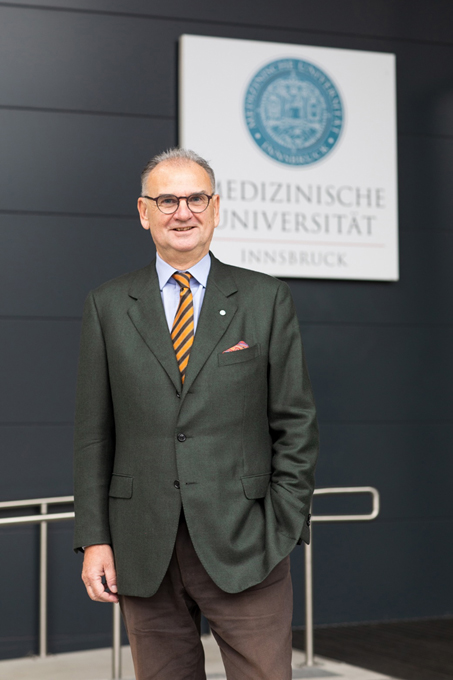
Wolfgang Fleischhacker 2020

Walter Wolfgang Fleischhacker (born 29 April 1953, Baden bei Wien) is an Austrian psychiatrist and psychotherapist. Previously professor of psychiatry at the Medical University of Innsbruck, he was appointed president of the university on 1 October 2017. He held this office until 30 September 2025.

== Career ==
Fleischhacker studied medicine at the University of Innsbruck, encompassing clinical clerkships at the Landeskrankenhaus Salzburg and Bispebjerg Hospital in Kopenhagen. He received his MD in 1978 from Innsbruck University and completed his residency training at the departments of psychiatry and neurology at the same institution. In 1987, he was awarded a Fulbright Travel Grant and spent 18 months as a research fellow at the Department of Psychiatric Research of Hillside Hospital, a teaching hospital of the Albert Einstein College of Medicine in New York. After his return to Innsbruck, he was promoted to associate professor of psychiatry based on his work on the pharmacoepidemiology of benzodiazepines.

In 1992, he became a board-certified behavioral psychotherapist. His promotion to full professor at the newly founded Clinical Division of Biological Psychiatry of the Medical Faculty followed in 1993. Between 1999 and 2003 he served as acting director of the Institute for Professional Communication and Psychotherapy at Innsbruck's Leopold Franzens University. In 2004 the medical faculty of the University of Innsbruck became an independent, autonomous new institution: The Medical University of Innsbruck. During this restructuring and transition process, Wolfgang Fleischhacker held various positions in the Department of Psychiatry, among these, he was managing director of the Department of Psychiatry, Psychotherapy, and Psychosomatics from 2008 to 2017. In May 2017, he was elected president of the Medical University of Innsbruck. He held this office until 30 September 2025.

During his tenure, he has also held positions as a Humes visiting professor at Weill Medical College of Cornell University in New York and a distinguished visiting professor at the Keio University School of Medicine in Tokyo. In 2021, he was appointed as a Clinical Professor of Psychiatry (Courtesy) at Weill Cornell Medical College in New York. He also served as vice president of the Vienna School for Clinical Research and as the co-chair of the Salzburg Seminars of the Open Medical Institute, and is chair of its scientific advisory board.

Next to a number of board positions in national and international professional organizations, he was president of the Austrian Society of Psychiatry and Psychotherapy between 2002 and 2005 and vice president of the International College of Neuropsychopharmacology (CINP) from 2006 to 2010.

He served as chairman of the European Group for Research in Schizophrenia (EGRIS) from 1997 to 2023. Noteworthy among his memberships in professional organizations are fellowships in the American College of Neuropsychopharmacology (ACNP), the European College of Neuropsychopharmacology (ECNP), and CINP.

== Awards ==
- Honorary president of the Austrian Schizophrenia Society (2004)
- Österreichisches Ehrenkreuz für Wissenschaft und Kunst (Austrian Cross of Honour for Science and Art, 2005)
- Honorary member of the World Psychiatric Association
- Grand Decoration of Honour in Gold for Services to the Republic of Austria (2024)
- Honorary member of the Austrian Society for Psychiatry, Psychotherapy and Psychosomatics (2025)

== Work ==
Fleischhacker's original work focused on addiction research and various aspects of clinical psychopharmacology. Following his research fellowship in New York, his main interest was devoted to schizophrenia research, with a strong focus on psychopharmacology. In the context of his expertise, he has served as an advisor at the World Health Organization (WHO), the World Psychiatric Association (WPA) as well the Austrian and European regulatory agencies. His most recent work involves large pragmatic clinical trials, studying the long-term outcome of schizophrenia. These efforts are funded through the European Framework Programm (FP7), and investigator-initiated grants from the pharmaceutical industry.

He is (co-)author of well over 400 scientific papers, his current Hirsch-index amounts to 96.

Fleischhacker advocates the necessity of best-practice comprehensive care models for the long-term treatment of schizophrenia, with continuous antipsychotic medication as a basis for these efforts.
