= Jarlskog =

Jarlskog is a Swedish surname, where 'skog' means a forest. Notable people with the surname include:

- Cecilia Jarlskog (born 1941), Swedish theoretical physicist
- Ida Jarlskog (born 1998), Swedish tennis player
