= Ludwig Boltzmann Prize =

The Ludwig Boltzmann Prize is awarded by the Austrian Physical Society and honors outstanding achievements in theoretical physics. It is named after the famous Austrian physicist Ludwig Boltzmann.

The prize was established at the annual meeting of the Austrian Physical Society in Innsbruck in 1953. It is awarded every other year, alternating with the Fritz Kohlrausch Prize for experimental physics, to an outstanding theoretical physicist who is usually not older than 35 years. Currently (2011) the prize money is 2500 Euro.

== Awardees ==
The following people have been awarded the prize.

- 1957 – Gernot Eder
- 1965 – K. Baumann
- 1967 – Heimo G. Latal
- 1969 – Alfred Bartl and F. Hernegger
- 1971 – Dieter Flamm
- 1973 – Bernhard Schnizer
- 1975 – Helmut Kühnelt
- 1977 – Gerhard Ecker
- 1979 – Juergen Hafner and Reinhart Kögerler
- 1981 – Harald Grosse
- 1983 – Peter Zoller
- 1985 – Bernhard Baumgartner
- 1987 – Fritz Gesztesy
- 1989 – M. Neumann
- 1993 – Helmut Ritsch and Monika Ritsch-Marte
- 1995 – Claudia Ambrosch-Draxl
- 1997 – Gerald Teschl
- 1999 – Thomas Rauscher
- 2001 – Georg Kresse
- 2003 – Christof Gattringer
- 2005 – Andreas Brandhuber
- 2007 – Peter Rabl
- 2009 – Andrew Daley
- 2011 – Barbara Kraus
- 2013 – Claudiu Genes
- 2015 – Josef Pradler
- 2017 – Mikhail Lemeshko
- 2019 – Maksym Serbyn
- 2021 – Farokh Mivehvar
- 2023 – Nikola Opačak

== See also ==
- Lise Meitner Lectures
- List of physics awards
- List of prizes named after people
