= Physikalisch-Technische Bundesanstalt =

National metrology institute of the German Federal Republic

Coordinates: 52°17′43″N 10°27′49″E

Physikalisch-Technische Bundesanstalt; – PTB –
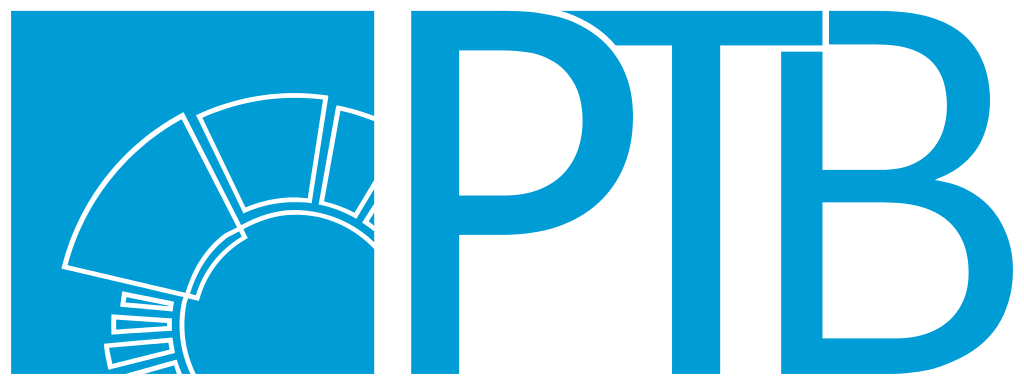

Agency overview
- Formed: 1887; 139 years ago
- Preceding agency: Physikalisch-Technische Reichsanstalt, Charlottenburg
- Type: Higher federal institute
- Jurisdiction: Federal Ministry for Economic Affairs and Climate Action
- Headquarters: Braunschweig
- Employees: 1900
- Agency executive: Cornelia Denz, President
- Website: ptb.de

The Physikalisch-Technische Bundesanstalt (PTB) is the national metrology institute of the Federal Republic of Germany, with scientific and technical service tasks. It is a higher federal authority and a public-law institution directly under federal government control, without legal capacity, under the auspices of the Federal Ministry for Economic Affairs and Energy.

== Tasks ==
Together with NIST in the USA and the NPL in Great Britain, PTB ranks among the leading metrology institutes in the world. As the National Metrology Institute of Germany, PTB is Germany's highest and only authority in terms of correct and reliable measurements. The Units and Time Act (Einheiten- und Zeitgesetz) assigns all tasks which are related with the realization and dissemination of the units to PTB. All legally relevant aspects regarding the units as well as PTB’s responsibilities have been combined in this Act. Previously, all questions regarding the units as well as the role of PTB had been distributed among three laws: the Units Act, the Time Act, and the Verification Act.

PTB consists of nine technical-scientific divisions (two of them in Berlin), which are subdivided into approx. 60 departments. These again are subdivided into more than 200 working groups. PTB's tasks are as follows: the determination of fundamental and natural constants; the realization, maintenance and dissemination of the legal units of the SI; and safety technology. This spectrum of tasks is supplemented by services such as the German Calibration Service (Deutscher Kalibrierdienst, DKD) and by metrology for the area regulated by law, metrology for industry, and metrology for technology transfer. As the basis for its tasks, PTB conducts fundamental research and development in the field of metrology in close cooperation with universities, other research institutions, and industry. PTB employs approximately 1900 staff members. It has a total budget of approx. €183 million at its disposal; in 2012, approx. €15 million was, in addition, canvassed as third-party funds for research projects.

The Units and Time Act entrusts PTB also especially with the dissemination of legal time in Germany. To have a time basis for this, PTB operates several atomic clocks (currently two cesium clocks and, since 1999 and 2009, respectively, two cesium fountain clocks). By order of PTB, the synchronization of clocks via radio is performed via the time signal transmitter DCF77 operated by Media Broadcast. Computers which are connected to the Internet can obtain the time also via the three public NTP time servers operated by PTB.

In Berlin-Adlershof, PTB operates the MLS (Metrology Light Source) electron storage ring for calibrations in the field from the infrared (THz) to the extreme ultraviolet (EUV).

Department Q.5 "Technical Cooperation" realizes projects of the German and international development cooperation in the field of quality infrastructure. These activities promote competitiveness as well as environmental protection and consumer protection in developing countries and in countries in transition. One of the tasks of PTB’s "Metrological Information Technology" Department – in accordance with the German Gambling Ordinance (§ 11 ff. SpielV) – is to grant type approvals for gaming machines which offer the possibility to make winnings. Also, according to the Federal Ordinance on Voting Machines, PTB is in charge of the type approval of voting computers. This is, however, moot as, in a judgment of 3 March 2009, the Federal Constitutional Court has declared the use of such voting machines to be inadmissible.

Weapons which may be carried with the Minor Firearms Certificate, i.e. weapons for shooting blanks or irritants and weapons used as signaling devices, require a PTB test mark for their approval. Occasionally, these weapons are also jointly referred to as "PTB weapons" and bear the PTA or PTB proof mark F (see also: Act on the Proof Testing of Arms and Ammunition).

== Sites and structure ==
The main site of PTB is in Braunschweig (Lehndorf-Watenbüttel). Other sites are in Berlin-Charlottenburg and Berlin-Adlershof. Divisions 1 to 6 as well as Division Q are located in Braunschweig. In Berlin-Charlottenburg Divisions 7 and 8 are located, and in Berlin-Adlershof the two electron storage rings BESSY II and the Metrology Light Source (MLS); the latter is located in the Willy Wien Laboratory.

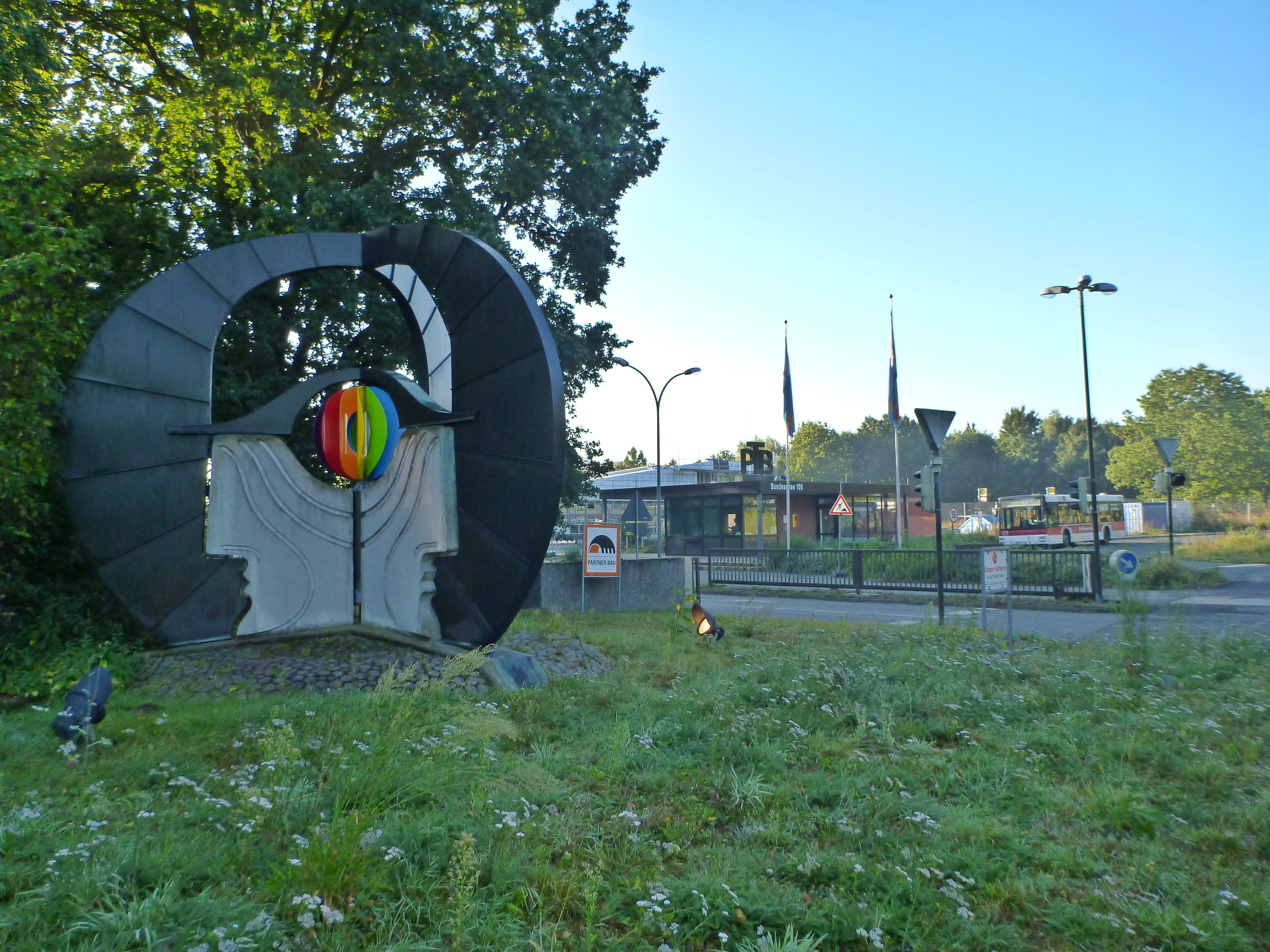
Main entrance to PTB in Braunschweig with the sculpture created by Friedrich Wilhelm Voswinkel

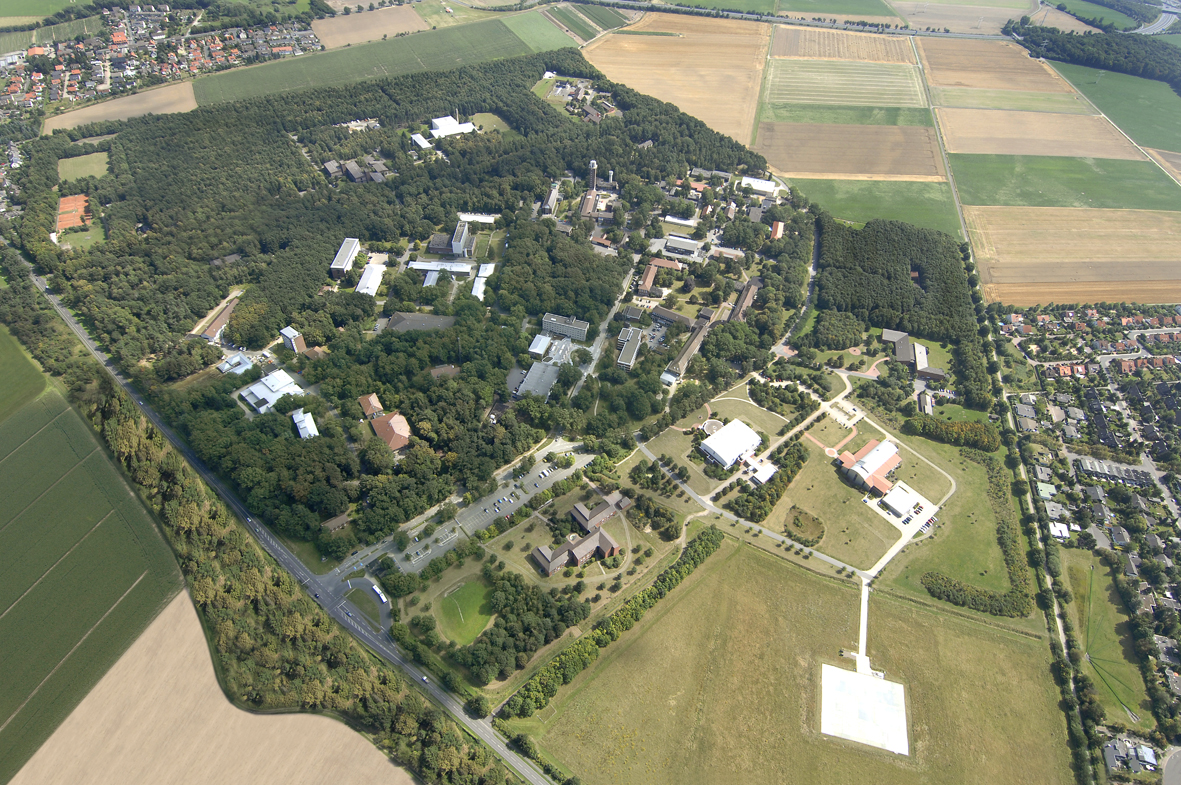
Aerial photo of the Braunschweig site

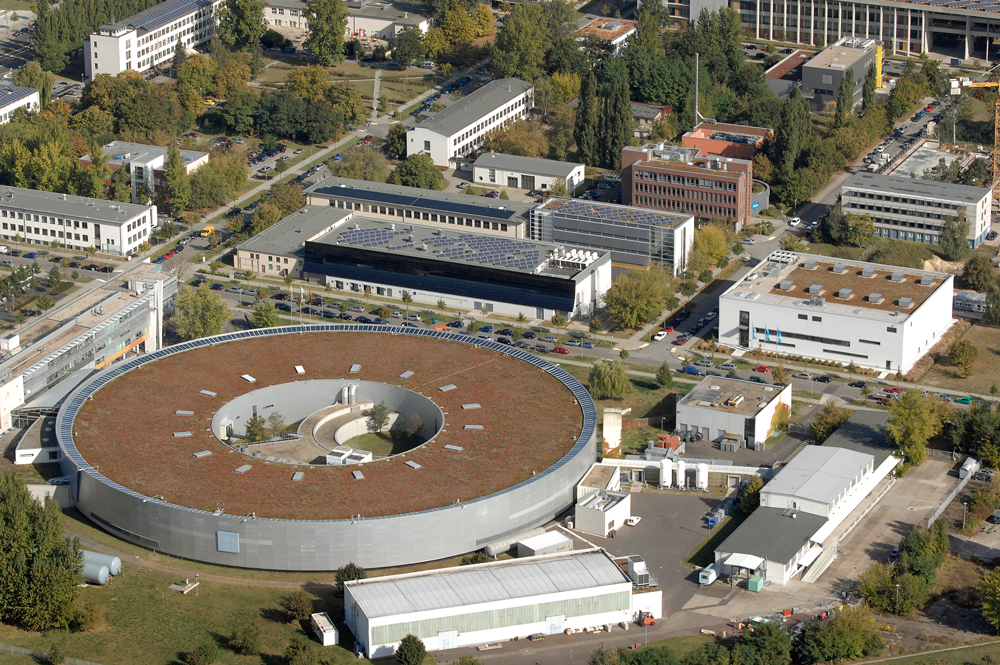
Aerial photo of the Berlin-Adlershof site

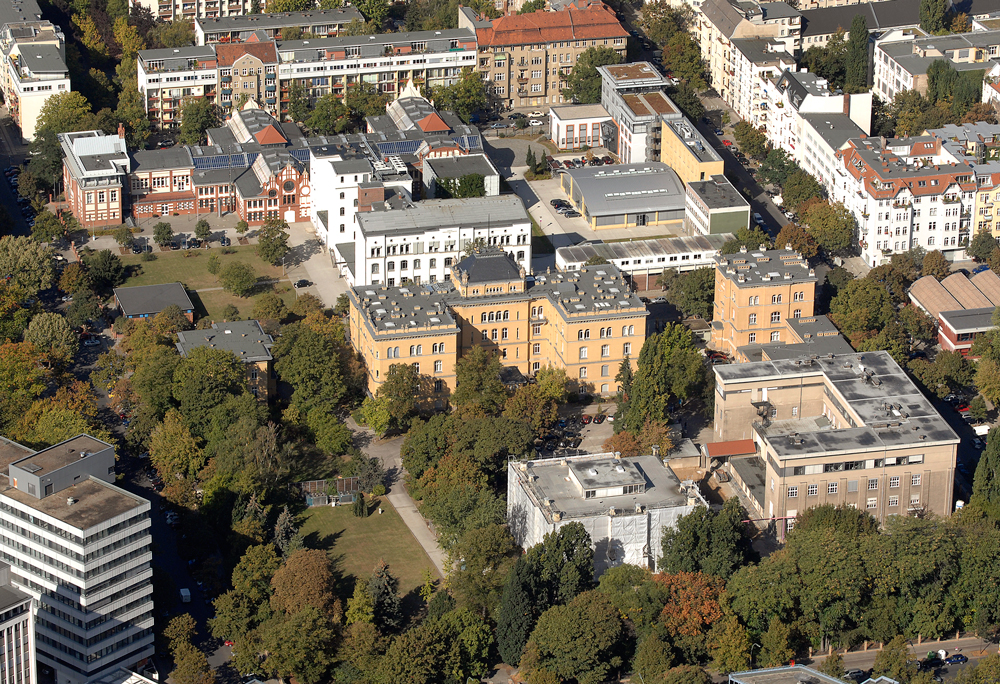
Aerial photo of the Berlin-Charlottenburg site

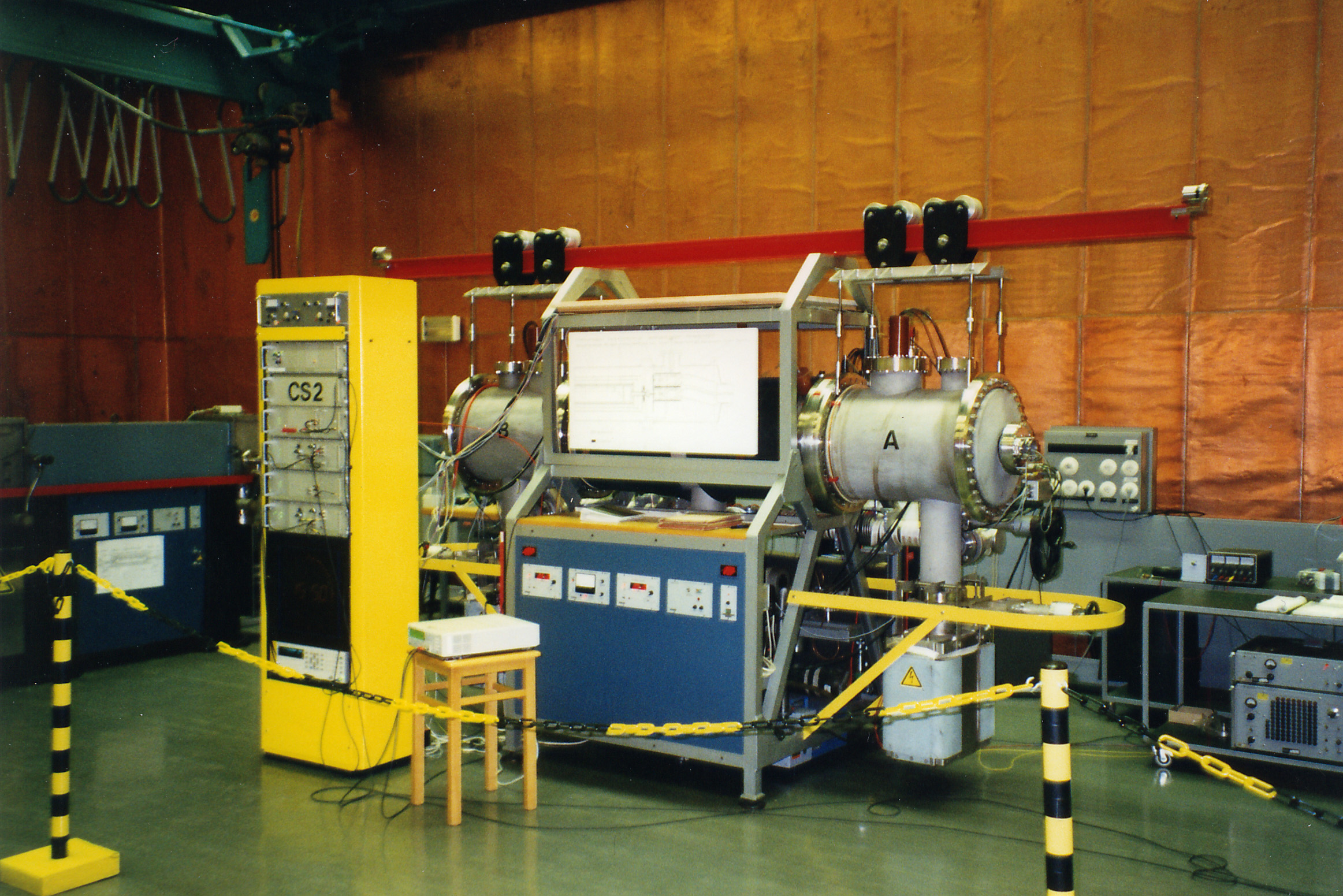
PTB's atomic clock CS2

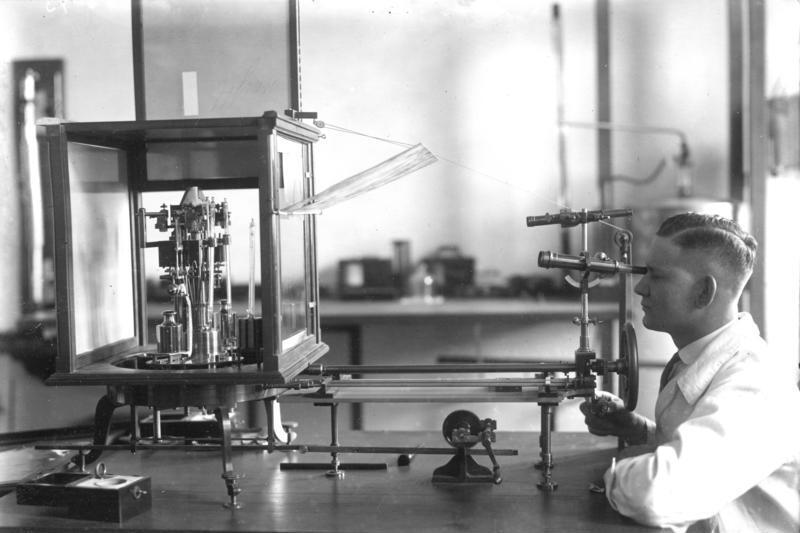
In the Reichsanstalt für Maß und Gewicht ("Imperial Institute for Weights and Measures" – RMG), photo probably published in 1928

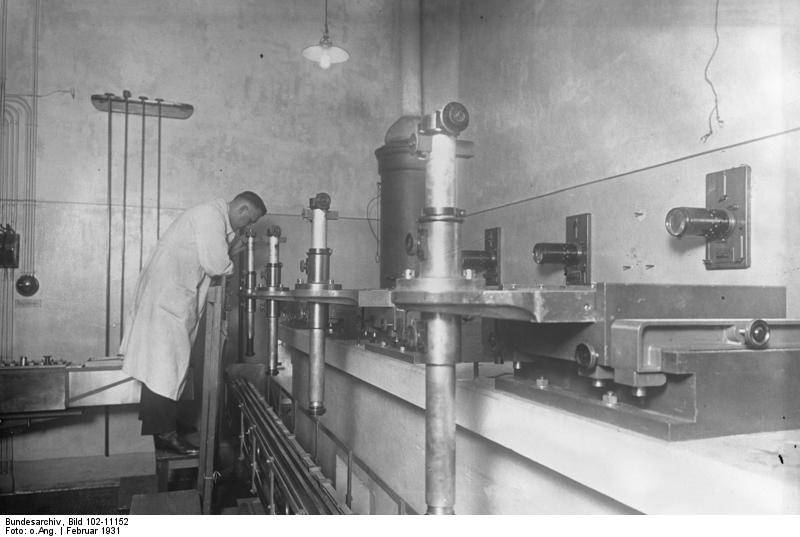
At the Reichsanstalt für Maß und Gewicht ("Imperial Institute for Weights and Measures" – RMG) in February 1931

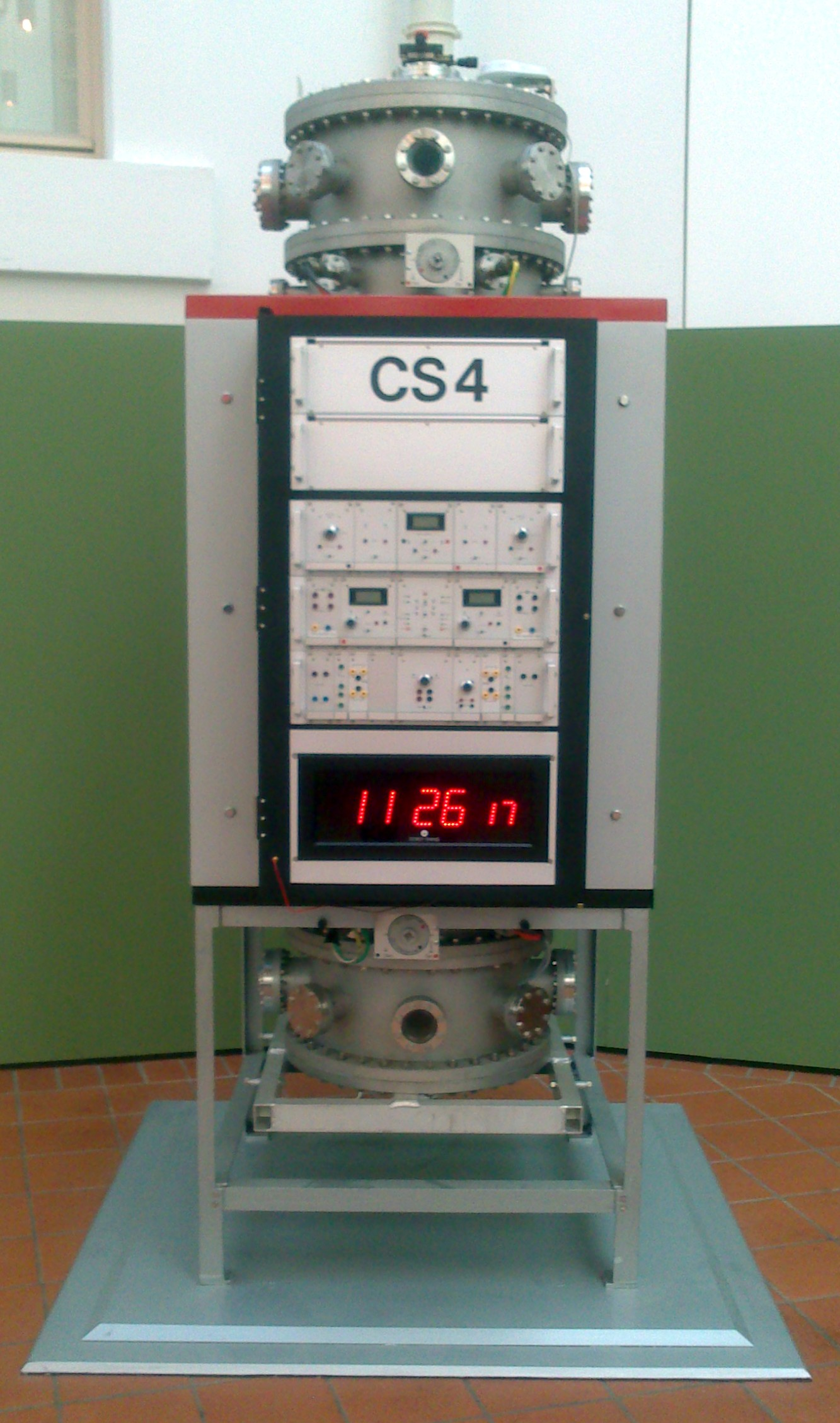
PTB's cesium atomic clock "CS 4", put into operation in 1992. Since 2005, it has been on exhibit in the Braunschweigisches Landesmuseum

PTB is headed by the Presidential Board in Braunschweig, which is composed of the President, the Vice-President and a further member. Another executive committee is the Directors' Conference, with the Presidential Board and the Heads of the Divisions as members. PTB is advised by the Kuratorium (PTB's Advisory Board), which is composed of representatives from science, the economy and politics.

Radio time signal stations

PTB is composed of the following nine divisions:

1. Division 1: Mechanics and Acoustics (site: Braunschweig) with the following departments: Mass, Solid Mechanics, Velocity, Gas Flow, Liquid Flow, Sound, Acoustics and Dynamics
2. Division 2: Electricity (site: Braunschweig) with the following departments: Direct Current and Low Frequency, High Frequency and Electromagnetic Fields, Electrical Energy Measuring Techniques, Quantum Electronics, Semiconductor Physics and Magnetism, Quantum Electrical Metrology
3. Division 3: Chemical Physics and Explosion Protection (site: Braunschweig) with the following departments: Metrology in Chemistry, Analytics and Thermodynamic State Behavior of Gases, Thermophysical Quantities, Physical Chemistry, Explosion Protection in Energy Technology, Explosion Protection in Sensor Technology and Instrumentation, Fundamentals of Explosion Protection
4. Division 4: Optics (site: Braunschweig) with the following departments: Photometry and Applied Radiometry, Imaging and Wave Optics, Quantum Optics and Unit of Length, Time and Frequency
5. Division 5: Precision Engineering (site: Braunschweig) with the following departments: Surface Metrology, Dimensional Nanometrology, Coordinate Metrology, Interferometry on Material Measures, Scientific Instrumentation Department
6. Division 6: Ionizing Radiation (site: Braunschweig) with the following departments: Radioactivity, Dosimetry for Radiation Therapy and Diagnostic Radiology, Radiation Protection Dosimetry, Ion and Neutron Radiation, Fundamentals of Dosimetry, Operational Radiation Protection
7. Division 7: Temperature and Synchrotron Radiation (site: Berlin-Charlottenburg and Adlershof) with the following departments: Radiometry with Synchrotron Radiation, Cryophysics and Spectrometry, Detector Radiometry and Radiation Thermometry, Temperature, Heat and Vacuum
8. Division 8: Medical Physics and Metrological Information Technology (site: Berlin-Charlottenburg) with the following departments: Medical Metrology, Biosignals, Biomedical Optics, Mathematical Modeling and Data Analysis, Metrological Information Technology
9. The Presidential Staff Office and the Press and Information Office as well as the Divisions Z (Administrative Services) and Q (Scientific-technical Cross-sectional Tasks) report directly to the Presidential Board. Division Q comprises, among other things, the Academic Library, the Legal Metrology and Technology Transfer Departments, the Technical Services, and the Technical Cooperation Department.

== History ==
Two essential factors which led to the founding of the Physikalisch-Technische Reichsanstalt (Imperial Physical Technical Institute – PTR) were the determination of internationally valid, uniform measures in the Meter Convention of 1875 and the dynamic industrial development in Germany in the 19th century. Already in the Franco-German War (1870/71), the stagnation in scientific mechanics and in the science of instruments had become evident in Germany. Increasingly precise metrology was required for industrial production. A considerable impact on the initiative for the founding of a state institute for metrology in order to promote the national interests of the economy, of trade and of the military was made – in particular – by the upcoming electrical industry under the direction of the inventor and industrialist Werner von Siemens. In contrast to the units of length and weight, no recognized methods and standards existed at that time in the field of electrical metrology. The lack of reliable and verifiable measurement methods for the realization of electrical (and other) measurement units was a pressing scientific and economic problem.

In 1872, some Prussian natural scientists joined forces and demanded the establishment of a state institute in order to solve this problem. The reason for this was that such a task was scientifically too ambitious for industrial laboratories and, in addition, not profitable for them, and classical training institutes were not suited for the task either. Among the supporters of the "Schellbach Memorandum" (named after its author Karl Heinrich Schellbach) ranked, among others, Hermann von Helmholtz and the mathematician and physicist Wilhelm Foerster. Prussia, however, initially rejected their demands.

Not until some years later were Werner von Siemens and Hermann von Helmholtz, the "founding fathers" of the PTR, able to make their vision – the establishment of a research institute which was to link scientific, technical and industrial interests in an optimal way – come true. Finally, on 28 March 1887, the Imperial Diet approved the first annual budget of the PTR – the founding of the first state-financed, university-external, major research institution in Germany which combined free fundamental research with services for industry. Werner von Siemens ceded private land in Berlin-Charlottenburg to the Reichsanstalt. Hermann von Helmholtz became its first president. At that time, 65 persons were employed at the PTR – among them more than a dozen physicists – who disposed of a budget of 263,000 Reichsmarks. In its first decades, the PTR succeeded in attracting important scientists and members of the Kuratorium as employees, among them Wilhelm Wien, Friedrich Kohlrausch, Walther Nernst, Emil Warburg, Walther Bothe, Albert Einstein and Max Planck.

=== Birth of quantum physics ===
The first outstanding scientific achievement at the PTR was also closely connected with Max Planck. To decide whether electricity or gas would be more economic for street lighting in Berlin, the PTR was to develop a more precise standard for luminous intensity. For this purpose, in 1895, Otto Lummer and Wilhelm Wien developed the first cavity radiator for the practical generation of thermal radiation. Their measurements of the spectrum of the black-body radiation were so precise that they contradicted Wien's radiation law at long wavelengths. This caused one of the cornerstones of classical physics of that time to totter. The measurements prompted a decisive impulse on the part of Max Planck to divide thermal radiation – in an "act of despair", as he later declared – into separate portions. This was the birth of quantum physics.

=== New structure and new physics ===
In 1914, the PTR President Emil Warburg discontinued the subdivision into a physical and a technical division and re-structured the PTR into divisions for optics, electricity and heat, with sub-divisions of a purely scientific and technical nature. Under Warburg's successor Walther Nernst, the Reichsanstalt für Maß und Gewicht (Imperial Institute for Weights and Measures – RMG) was, in addition, integrated into the PTR. A newly established division took over from the RMG extensive tasks with regard to the verification system as well as the measurements of length, weight and volume associated with the verification system. The profile of tasks was thus similar to that of PTB today: Through its own research and development, and through services building on this, the PTR was to ensure the uniformity of metrology and its continuous further development. As regards contents, the PTB was dedicated at that time to the so-called New Physics. This included, among other things, research on the newly discovered X-rays, new atomic models, Einstein's Special Theory of Relativity, quantum physics (based on the already mentioned work on the black-body radiator), and the investigation of the properties of the electron. Scientists like Hans Geiger, who established the first radioactivity laboratory of PTR, were involved in this research work. Walther Meißner succeeded in liquefying helium, which led him to the discovery of the superconductivity of a series of metals. In this connection, he recognized some years later – together with his colleague Robert Ochsenfeld – that superconductors have the property of displacing from their interior a magnetic field which has been applied from the outside – the Meißner-Ochsenfeld Effect.

=== Nazi Germany ===
With the appointment of Johannes Stark as president on 1 May 1933, the ideology of National Socialism found its way into the PTR. The convinced advocate of a German Physics terminated diverse research projects on issues of modern physics to which he referred to as "Jewish", among them, in particular, works on quantum physics and on the theory of relativity. Stark also tried to enforce the "Führer principle" (Führerprinzip) at the PTR: in 1935, he dissolved the Kuratorium and took over its competences himself. Jewish employees and critics of the NSDAP (such as Max von Laue) were dismissed. After World War II, Von Laue participated in the re-founding of PTB. Albert Einstein, who had been thrown out of the Kuratorium already before its dissolution, broke ties to PTR/PTB.

Under Stark and – after 1939 – under his successor Abraham Esau, the PTR strongly dedicated itself to armament research. A newly founded laboratory for acoustics was not only to investigate general – but mainly also military – fields of application. This included, among other things, the acoustic finding of artillery, the military utilization of ultrasound and the development of decoding procedures. In addition, researchers of PTR developed acoustic mines and a steering system for torpedoes which orientated itself on the sound field of traveling ships. Due to its classical metrological tasks, the PTR was also closely connected with the armament industry of the Third Reich. Since exact measures are a basic requirement for the manufacture of military equipment, the PTR gained a key role in armament production and defense. The extent to which the PTR was also involved in the German nuclear weapons project is controversial. It is, however, known that – prior to his time as PTR president – Abraham Esau conducted – until 1939 – a group of researchers dealing with nuclear fission. Later, he took over the specialist area "nuclear fission" in the Reich Research Council which supervised, from spring 1942 on, the German uranium project. Shortly after that, Hermann Göring subordinated the working group under the former PTR physicist Kurt Diebner to Division V for atomic physics at the PTR. Esau received the title "Authorized Representative of the Reichsmarschall for Nuclear Physics", a post which he, however, ceded to Walther Gerlach already at the end of 1943.

To escape the bombing raids of the allies, the PTR was, in 1943, relocated at the initiative of the president and Thuringian privy councillor Abraham Esau to different places in Germany (for example to Weida and Ronneburg in Thuringia and to Bad Warmbrunn in Lower Silesia). During the attacks on Berlin, the buildings of the PTR were heavily damaged. In 1945, the Reichsanstalt was virtually destroyed and the few departments which still existed were scattered all over the country.

=== Re-founding of PTB in Braunschweig and other PTR successors ===
Approximately from 1947 on, successor institutes were developed in addition to the PTR in Berlin-Charlottenburg, i.e. one in East Berlin – for the Soviet Occupation Zone – and one in the Bizone – and later Trizone. With the well-meaning support of the British Military Government, parts of the old Reichsanstalt were established in Braunschweig. The idea for this re-founding had been developed by the former PTR advisor for theoretical physics, Max von Laue, already during his internment in Farm Hall. In 1947, he succeeded in convincing the British authorities to make the former Luftfahrtforschungsanstalt (Aeronautical Research Institute) in Völkenrode near Braunschweig available to the PTR successor. In 1948, Wilhelm Kösters, who had been the director of Division 1 in Berlin for many years, became its first president. Many former PTR employees from Berlin, Weida and Heidelberg followed him to Braunschweig. The new institute was named ꞋꞋPhysikalisch-Technische AnstaltꞋꞋ (PTA) and, since 1 April 1950, ꞋꞋPhysikalisch-Technische BundesanstaltꞋꞋ. In 1953, the West Berlin PTR was integrated into this institute as ꞋꞋBerlin InstituteꞋꞋ while respecting the four-power status of Berlin.

In the German Democratic Republic (GDR), the Deutsches Amt für Maß und Gewicht (DAMG) had established itself with its principle seat in Berlin. After several renamings, this institute was designated Amt für Standardisierung, Meßwesen und Warenprüfung (Office for Standardization, Metrology and Quality Control – ASMW) during the last GDR years; the name already indicates that this office of the GDR had more extensive tasks than PTB in the Federal Republic of Germany (FRG), namely additional tasks in the field of standardization and quality assurance and in the area of activity of the Bundesanstalt für Materialforschung und -prüfung (BAM).

=== Growth and reunification ===
The young PTB grew rapidly in the years after its founding – both in terms of staff and in terms of financial resources. Not only its scientific metrological profile was extended, but also its palette of services rendered to industry, in particular in the form of calibrations of measuring instruments. In the 1970s, this led to the founding of the Deutscher Kalibrierdienst (German Calibration Service), which delegated service tasks to accredited, privately run laboratories and allowed PTB to concentrate itself on more demanding measurement tasks.

From 1967 to 1995, PTB operated the Experimental and Research Reactor Braunschweig. This reactor served in particular as neutron source for fundamental research, not for the investigation of nuclear energy. PTB dealt with this controversial subject from 1977 to 1989, above all due to the fact that the task "long-term management and disposal of radioactive waste" had been assigned to it. Later on, this field of work passed over to the ″Bundesamt für Strahlenschutz″ (Federal Office for Radiation Protection) after same had been newly established. Today, PTB’s Division 6 deals with ionizing radiation in general. This also includes a highly sensitive trace survey station for radionuclides which has been measuring radioactive substances in ground-level air for more than 50 years.

The "Wende" ("political change") in Germany in 1990 also led to a "reunification in metrology". PTB took over parts of the ASMW (Office for Standardization, Metrology and Quality Control of the former German Democratic Republic), among them 400 employees, and the site Berlin-Friedrichshagen as additional field office (this has since been given up again). Other parts of the ASMW were integrated into the BAM. Despite a phase of staff reductions – after the strong expansion following reunification – PTB ranks today among the largest national metrology institutes in the world. As such, it is in charge of the realization and dissemination of the physical units and promotes the worldwide uniformity of metrology.

== Journals ==
Issues of the PTB magazine "maßstäbe" published so far:
Issue No.	Title	Translation	Date of issue
1	Dimensionen der Einheiten	Dimensions of the Units	September 2001
2	Größen des Sports	Sizes of Sport	June 2002
3	Zum Licht	To the Light	February 2003
4	Im Labyrinth des Zufalls	In the Labyrinth of Random	December 2003
5	Kleine Größen	Small Sizes	December 2004
6	Zeitgeschichten	Contemporary Histories	September 2005
7	Die Unveränderlichen	The Immutable	September 2006
8	Innenansichten	Interior Views	October 2007
9	Die Gradmesser	The Indicators	November 2008
10	Menschen im Labor	People in the Lab	December 2009
11	Kräfte messen	Measuring Forces	May 2011
12	Meilensteine	Milestones	June 2013
13	Alltag in Maßen	Everyday life in moderation	July 2016
14	Maße für alle	Measurements for All	November 2018

The PTB magazine maßstäbe, which is published approximately once a year, can be subscribed to free of charge or it can be downloaded from the Internet pages of PTB. It contains articles about the quantities of physics. These articles are intended to be generally understandable and informative for the broad public.

In addition, PTB publishes the scientific information bulletin PTB-news three times a year. On four pages, it contains news from the fields of work "Fundamentals of Metrology", "Applied Metrology for Industry", "Medicine and Environmental Protection", "Metrology for Society" and "International Affairs". The PTB-news are published in German and in English.

PTB-Mitteilungen is the metrological specialist journal and the official information bulletin of PTB. It is published four times a year and contains original scientific articles as well as overview articles on metrological subjects from PTB's fields of activity. Each volume focuses on a main topic. As an official information bulletin, the journal stands in a long tradition which goes back to the beginnings of the Physikalisch-Technische Reichsanstalt (Imperial Technical Physical Institute - PTR, founded in 1887). Until 2014, "PTB-Mitteilungen" was also the official bulletin in which the type approvals granted by PTB as well as the tests and conformity assessments carried out by PTB were published in a section of its own [named "Amtliche Bekanntmachungen" ("Official Notes")]. With the new Measures and Verification Act which has been in force since 1 January 2015 and with the new Measures and Verification Ordinance, there is no longer a legal basis for these notices. From 2015 onwards, "PTB-Mitteilungen" is, therefore, a purely metrological specialist journal and does not publish any "Official Notes" any more.

== Presidents ==
Presidents of PTB and of the Physikalisch-Technische Reichsanstalt Berlin-Charlottenburg:

- 1888–1894: Hermann von Helmholtz, founding president
- 1895–1905: Friedrich Kohlrausch
- 1905–1922: Emil Warburg
- 1922–1924: Walther Nernst
- 1924–1933: Friedrich Paschen
- 1933–1939: Johannes Stark
- 1939–1945: Abraham Esau
- 1945: Wilhelm Steinhaus (for a short time, until the dissolution of the PTR)
- 1947: Martin Grützmacher (temporary director of the re-founded PTB in Braunschweig)
- 1948–1950: Wilhelm Kösters
- 1951–1961: Richard Vieweg
- 1961–1969: Martin Kersten
- 1970–1975: Ulrich Stille
- 1975–1995: Dieter Kind
- 1995–2011: Ernst O. Göbel
- 2012-2022: Joachim Ullrich
- 2022–present: Cornelia Denz

== Employees ==
Employees of PTR and PTB were, among others: Udo Adelsberger, Walther Bothe, Kurt Diebner, Gerhard Wilhelm Becker, Ernst Engelhard, Abraham Esau, Ernst Gehrcke, Hans Geiger, Werner Gitt, Eugen Goldstein, Ernst Carl Adolph Gumlich, Hermann von Helmholtz, Fritz Hennin, Friedrich Georg Houtermans, Max Jakob, Hellmut Keiter, Dieter Kind, Hans Otto Kneser, Friedrich Wilhelm Kohlrausch, Wilhelm Kösters, Bernhard Anton Ernst Kramer, Johannes Kramer, August Kundt, Max von Laue, Carl von Linde, Leopold Loewenherz, Otto Lummer, Walter Meidinger, Walther Meißner, Franz Mylius, Walther Hermann Nernst, Robert Ochsenfeld, Friedrich Paschen, Matthias Scheffler, Adolf Scheibe, Harald Schering, Reinhard Scherm, Johannes Stark, Ulrich Stille, Ida Tacke, Gotthold Richard Vieweg, Richard Wachsmuth, Emil Warburg, Wilhelm Wien.

== Similar organisations ==
- Eidgenössisches Institut für Metrologie (Switzerland)
- Bundesamt für Eich- und Vermessungswesen (Austria)
- National Measurement Institute, Australia (Australia)
- National Physical Laboratory (NPL) (UK)
- National Institute of Standards and Technology (formerly: "National Bureau of Standards") (USA)
- Internationales Büro für Maß und Gewicht, Paris (Bureau International des Poids et Mesures, BIPM)

== Literature ==
- Hermann von Helmholtz: Zählen und Messen, erkenntnistheoretisch betrachtet. Original publication in: Philosophische Aufsätze, Eduard Zeller zu seinem fünfzigjährigen Doctorjubiläum gewidmet (dedicated to Eduard Zeller on the occasion of the 50th anniversary of his doctoral degree. Leipzig 1887. Fues’ Verlag. pp. 17–52. Digital edition: Heidelberg University Library, Heidelberg, 2010.
- Johannes Stark (editor): Forschung und Prüfung. 50 Jahre Physikalisch-Technische Reichsanstalt. S. Hirzel, Leipzig 1937.
- H. Moser (editor): Forschung und Prüfung. 75 Jahre Physikalisch-Technische Bundesanstalt/Reichsanstalt. Vieweg, Braunschweig 1962.
- Jürgen Bortfeld, W. Hauser, Helmut Rechenberg (Ed.): 100 Jahre Physikalisch-Technische Reichsanstalt/Bundesanstalt 1887–1987. (= Forschen – Messen – Prüfen. Vol. 1) Braunschweig 1987, ISBN 3-876-64140-3.
- David Cahan: Meister der Messung. Die Physikalisch-Technische Reichsanstalt im Deutschen Kaiserreich. Wirtschaftsverlag NW, Bremerhaven 2011, ISBN 978-3-86918-081-6.
- Ulrich Kern: Forschung und Präzisionsmessung. Die Physikalisch-Technische Reichsanstalt zwischen 1918 und 1948. Wirtschaftsverlag NW, Bremerhaven 2011, ISBN 978-3-86918-082-3.
- Dieter Kind: Herausforderung Metrologie. Die Physikalisch-Technische Bundesanstalt und die Entwicklung seit 1945. in: Forschen – Messen – Prüfen. Wirtschaftsverlag, Bremerhaven 2002, ISBN 3-89701-902-7.
- Rudolf Huebener, Heinz Lübbig: A Focus of Discoveries. World Scientific, Singapur 2008, ISBN 978-9-812-79034-7.
- Rudolf Huebener, Heinz Lübbig: Die Physikalisch-Technische Reichsanstalt. Ihre Bedeutung beim Aufbau der modernen Physik. Vieweg+Teubner, Wiesbaden 2011, ISBN 978-3-834-81390-9.
- Brigitte Jacob, Wolfgang Schäche, Norbert Szymanski: Bauten für die Wissenschaft – 125 Jahre Physikalisch-Technische Reichsanstalt/Bundesanstalt in Berlin-Charlottenburg 1887–2012. JOVIS Verlag, Berlin 2012, ISBN 978-3-86859-163-7.
- Imke Frischmuth, Jens Simon (Eds.): A Metrological Textbook. The Art of Measuring at PTB – in the Past, Present and Future. Wirtschaftsverlag NW, Bremerhaven 2012, ISBN 978-3-86918-301-5.
