= Robert Ochsenfeld =

German physicist

Robert Ochsenfeld (18 May 1901 – 5 December 1993) was a German physicist. In 1933 he discovered together with Walther Meissner the Meissner–Ochsenfeld effect.

Born in Helberhausen, Germany, Ochsenfeld studied physics at the Philipps University of Marburg. The subject of his PhD was the study of ferromagnetism. In 1932-1933 he worked at the Physikalisch-Technische Reichsanstalt (PTR) in Berlin in the low temperature group headed by Meissner. Leaving the PTR, he taught at the National Political Institutes of Education in Potsdam until 1940, followed by research for new weapons in World War II.

After the war, he worked until retirement in the Physikalisch-Technische Bundesanstalt (PTB), the successor of the PTR with focus on magnetic materials.
