= Mietek Jaroniec =

Polish-American chemist

- Education: Maria Curie-Skłodowska University (M.Sc, Ph.D., D.Sc)
- Awards: Marie Curie Medal (2016)
- Scientific career
- Fields: Chemistry; Biochemistry; Materials Science
- Workplaces: Maria Curie-Skłodowska University; Kent State University

Mietek Jaroniec (born 1 January 1949) is a Polish and American chemist and an author of over 950 scientific papers, which got over 127,964 citations and brings him an h-index of 155.

== Biography ==
He was born in 1949 in Okrzeja, Poland. He obtained his masters and Ph.D. degrees in chemistry at the Curie-Sklodowska University in 1972 and 1976 respectively. From 1972 to 1991 he worked at the Department of Theoretical Chemistry, Marie Curie-Sklodowska University and since 1991 works at Kent State University as a professor. Prior to it, he also was a research assistant from 1972 to 1977 after which he got promoted to the assistant professor a position that he kept till 1980. From 1980 to 1985 he was an associate professor and then climbed the career ladder to become professor at which he remained till 1989.

== Publications ==
From 1981 to 1986 he served as an editor of the Thin Solid Films and from 1985 to the same year was Journal of Colloid Interface Science editor. He also served as an editor of Heterogeneous Chemistry Reviews from 1994 to 1997 and is currently edits such journals as the Journal of Liquid Chromatography, Journal of Porous Materials, among others.

== Awards ==
In 1997 he was awarded by the Japan Society for the Promotion of Science and in 2001 became a recipient of the Carbon Hall of Fame Award. In 2007, for his achievements, he was awarded A. Waksmundzki Medal from the Polish Chemical Society and then got an honorary degree from Nicolaus Copernicus University on February 19, 2009 and in 2010 from Military Technical University. In 2016, he received the Marie Curie Medal by the Polish Chemical Society.
