= Lise Meitner Lectures =

The Lise Meitner Lectures (LML) are a series of public lectures in honour of Lise Meitner. The lectures are organized jointly by the German Physical Society and the Austrian Physical Society, with the intention to showcase outstanding female scientists in physics or related fields. The annual lecture series was launched in 2008, when Lise Meitner's birthday celebrated its 130th anniversary. In October 2008, the Lise Meitner Lecture was held in Vienna and Berlin with an accompanying exhibition. The annual lecture series not only aims at increasing the visibility of successful female researchers, but also at encouraging girls and young women towards careers in physics.

== Awardees ==
- 2026: Michèle Heurs, "Gravitational wave astronomy – quo vadis?"
- 2025: Anne L’Huillier, "Attosecond pulses of light for studying electron dynamics"
- 2024: Lisa Kaltenegger, "Alien Earths: Searching for a Second Earth - Challenges, Opportunities and Adventures"
- 2023: Donna Strickland, "Generating High-Intensity, Ultrashort Optical Pulses"
- 2022: Viola Priesemann, "Learning in living neuronal networks" (Lernen in lebenden neuronalen Netzwerken)
- 2021: Claudia Draxl, "Quantum-based Materials Modeling and Artificial Intelligence for Tackling Societal Challenges"
- 2019: Halina Rubinsztein-Dunlop, "Sculpted light in nano- and microsystems"
- 2017/18: Nicola Spaldin, "New materials for a new age" (DPG 2018/ÖPG 2017)
- 2017/18: Johanna Stachel, "Erforschung von Urknallmaterie an der Weltmaschine LHC" (DPG 2017/ÖPG 2018)
- 2016: Petra Schwille, "Ist Leben konstruierbar?"
- 2015: Cornelia Denz, "Material in neuem Licht - wie maßgeschneidertes Licht Materie strukturieren und anordnen kann"
- 2014: Felicitas Pauss, "Das Higgs-Teilchen: Unsichtbares sichtbar und Unmögliches möglich machen"
- 2013: Jocelyn Bell Burnell, "Pulsars and extreme physics"
- 2012: Renate Loll, "More than meets the eye: probing the Planckian structure of spacetime"
- 2010: Anna Frebel, "Die ältesten Sterne im Universum und die chemische Entwicklung unserer Galaxie"
- 2009: Cecilia Jarlskog, "Symmetries – exact and broken"
- 2008: Mildred Dresselhaus, "Why are we so excited about nano-carbons?"

== See also ==
- Lise Meitner Distinguished Lecture
- Meitner Medal
- Ludwig Boltzmann Prize
