= Peter Barker (physicist) =

Australian-born British physicist (born 1967)

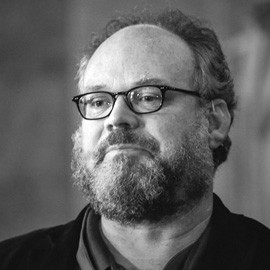
- Born: 1967 (age 58–59); Australia
- Education: University of Queensland
- Scientific career
- Fields: Physicist
- Workplaces: University College London
- Doctoral advisor: Halina Rubinsztein-Dunlop
- Website: https://www.ucl.ac.uk/physics-astronomy/people/professor-peter-barker

Peter Barker (born 1967) is an Australian-born British physicist.

Barker obtained his PhD in Physics in 1996 from the University of Queensland under the supervision of Halina Rubinsztein-Dunlop.

From 1997 to 2000, he was a postdoctoral fellow and lecturer at Princeton University in the US. From 2001 to 2006, he was a lecturer at Heriot-Watt University in Edinburgh in the UK. He held an EPSRC Research Fellowship from 2005–2010. In 2006, he moved to University College London as Reader and became a Professor in 2007.

He was the head of the Atomic, Molecular, Optical and Positron Physics group in the Department of Physics and Astronomy at University College London (UCL). Since 2005, his research has concentrated on the cooling, manipulation and transport of atoms, molecules and nanoparticles in optical tweezers. In 2017, he began to explore experimental approaches to create a micron-sized fridge using optical refrigeration of a submicrometre crystal suspended in optical and ion traps.
