= Werner Gitt =

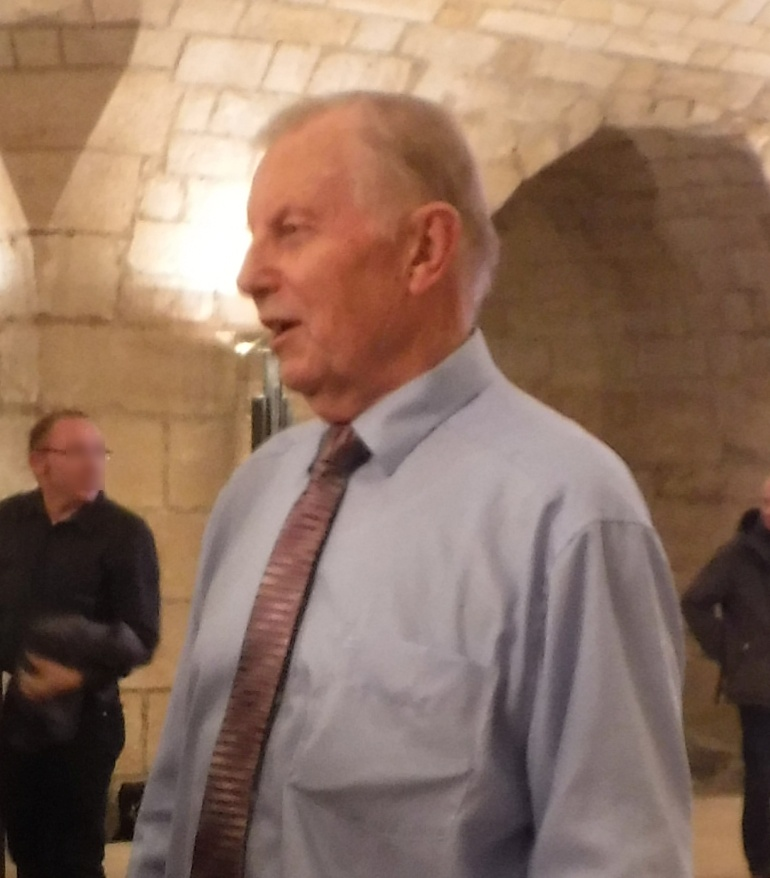
Prof. a. D. Dr.-Ing. Werner Gitt after a lecture in the lower church of the Dresden Frauenkirche

Werner Gitt (born 22 February 1937) is a German engineer and young earth creationist. Before retirement, he was Head of the Department of Information Technology at Physikalisch-Technische Bundesanstalt.

== Biography ==
Gitt was born in Stallupönen, East Prussia. He became an engineering professor at the Physikalisch-Technische Bundesanstalt, Germany's national institute for natural and engineering sciences. By the 1990s he was assuming a leadership role in the German creationist movement, through the publication of several influential creationist books. He was one of the leaders of the nondenominational Wort und Wissen (Word and Knowledge) society, the largest creationist society in Germany. He has written articles for a creationist apologetics web site.

== Works ==
- 1992 Questions - that always get asked (Fragen - die immer wieder gestellt werden) (ISBN 3-89397-184-X)
- 1993 Did God use Evolution? (Schuf Gott durch Evolution?) (ISBN 3-89397-725-2)
- 1993 Signals from Space - Why are there Stars? (Signale aus dem All - Wozu gibt es Sterne?) (ISBN 3-89397-705-8)
- 1994 If Animals Could Talk (Wenn Tiere reden könnten) (ISBN 3-89397-760-0)
- 1997 In the Beginning was Information (Am Anfang war die Information) (ISBN 3-89397-255-2)
- 1999 The Wonder of Man (ISBN 3-89397-397-4)
- 2000 In the Beginning was the Big Bang? (Am Anfang war der Urknall?) (ISBN 3-89397-433-4)
- 2001 Time And Eternity (Zeit und Ewigkeit) (ISBN 3-89397-473-3)

== Bibliography ==
- Numbers, Ronald (30 November 2006). The Creationists: From Scientific Creationism to Intelligent Design, Expanded Edition. Harvard University Press. p. 409. ISBN 0-674-02339-0.
