= Raphael Høegh-Krohn =

Norwegian mathematician (1938–1988)

- Born: 10 February 1938; Ålesund
- Died: 24 January 1988 (aged 49)
- Education: Ph.D., New York University
- Alma mater: New York University
- Scientific career
- Fields: Mathematics
- Doctoral advisor: Kurt Friedrichs
- Doctoral students: Helge Holden

Jan Raphael Høegh-Krohn (10 February 1938 – 24 January 1988) was a Norwegian mathematician.

He finished his Ph.D. in 1966, titled On Partly Gentle Perturbation with Application to Perturbation by Annihilation-Creation Operator, under the supervision of Kurt Friedrichs at the New York University.

He authored over 150 papers and is known for the discovery of a fundamental duality in relativistic quantum statistical mechanics by representing the basic correlation functions in terms of a certain stochastic process, now known as the Høegh-Krohn process.

== Books ==
- Albeverio, Sergio; Gesztesy, Friedrich; Høegh-Krohn, Raphael; Holden, Helge: Solvable models in quantum mechanics. Texts and Monographs in Physics. Springer-Verlag, New York, 1988.
- Albeverio, Sergio; Høegh-Krohn, Raphael; Fenstad, Jens Erik; Lindstrøm, Tom: Nonstandard methods in stochastic analysis and mathematical physics. Pure and Applied Mathematics, 122. Academic Press, Inc., Orlando, FL, 1986.
- Albeverio, S.; Gesztesy, F.; Høegh-Krohn, R.; Holden, H.: Solvable models in quantum mechanics. Second edition. With an appendix by Pavel Exner. AMS Chelsea Publishing, Providence, RI, 2005.
- Albeverio, Sergio A.; Høegh-Krohn, Raphael J.: Mathematical theory of Feynman path integrals. Lecture Notes in Mathematics, Vol. 523. Springer-Verlag, Berlin-New York, 1976.
