= Walther Meissner =

German physicist (1882–1974)

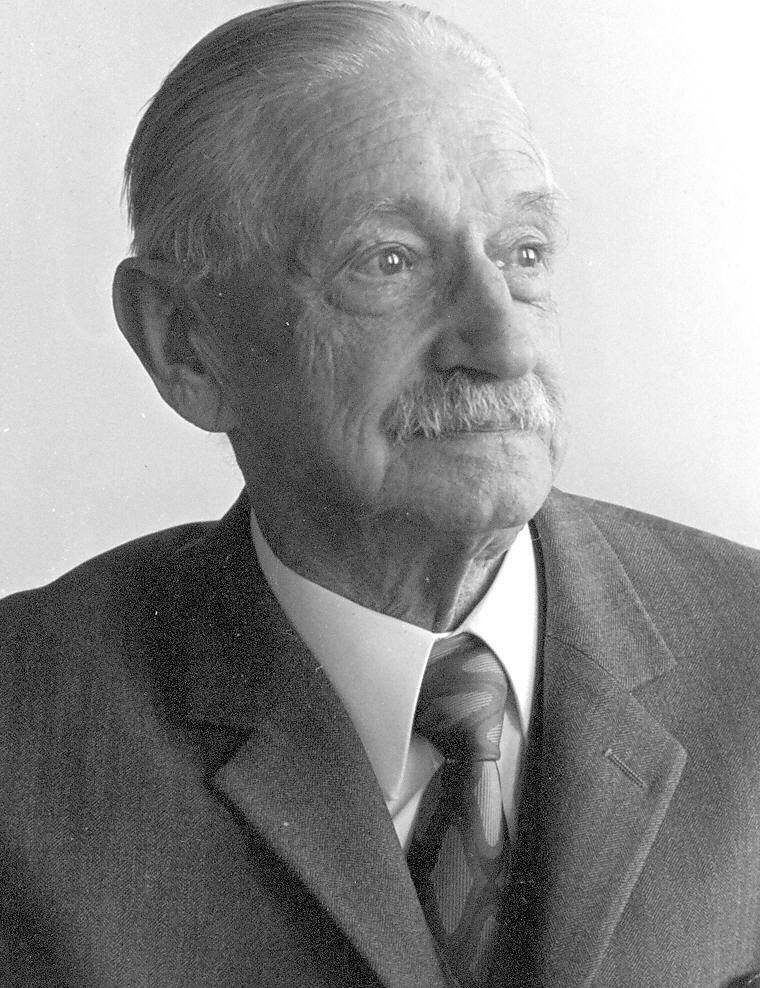
- Meissner, c. 1968
- Born: Fritz Walther Meissner; 16 December 1882; Berlin, German Empire
- Died: 16 November 1974 (aged 91); Munich, Bavaria, West Germany
- Education: Technische Hochschule Berlin; University of Berlin (Dr. phil.)
- Known for: Meissner effect; Holm–Meissner effect
- Awards: Simon Memorial Prize (1970)
- Scientific career
- Fields: Low temperature physics
- Workplaces: Physikalisch-Technische Reichsanstalt; Technische Hochschule München; Bavarian Academy of Sciences and Humanities
- Doctoral advisor: Max Planck

Fritz Walther Meissner (16 December 1882 – 16 November 1974) was a German physicist known for his work on superconductivity.

== Biography ==
Fritz Walther Meissner was born on 16 December 1882 in Berlin, Germany, the son of Waldemar Meissner and Johanna Greger.

From 1901 to 1904, Meissner studied mechanical engineering at Technische Hochschule Berlin (now Technische Universität Berlin). He then studied physics under Max Planck at the University of Berlin, receiving his Ph.D. in 1907.

Meissner joined the Physikalisch-Technische Reichsanstalt (now the Physikalisch-Technische Bundesanstalt) in Berlin. From 1922 to 1925, he established the world's third largest helium-liquifier.

In 1933, Meissner and Robert Ochsenfeld discovered that magnetic fields are expelled from a material when it becomes superconducting—a phenomenon known as the Meissner effect. The following year, he was appointed Professor of Technical Physics at Technische Hochschule München (now the Technical University of Munich).

After World War II, Meissner was elected President of the Bavarian Academy of Sciences and Humanities. In 1946, he founded the Academy's Commission for Low Temperature Research. The Commission was located in Herrsching am Ammersee until 1967, when it was moved to Garching.

In 1970, Meissner was awarded the Simon Memorial Prize "for his work in many areas of low temperature physics and technology and, in particular, in the field of superconductivity".

Meissner lived alone with his two dogs for the last several years of his life. He died on 16 November 1974 in Munich at the age of 91.

In 1982, on his 100th birthday, the Commission for Low Temperature Research was renamed the Walther-Meissner-Institute for Low Temperature Research in memory of him.
