= Peter Denz =

German engineer (1940–2022)

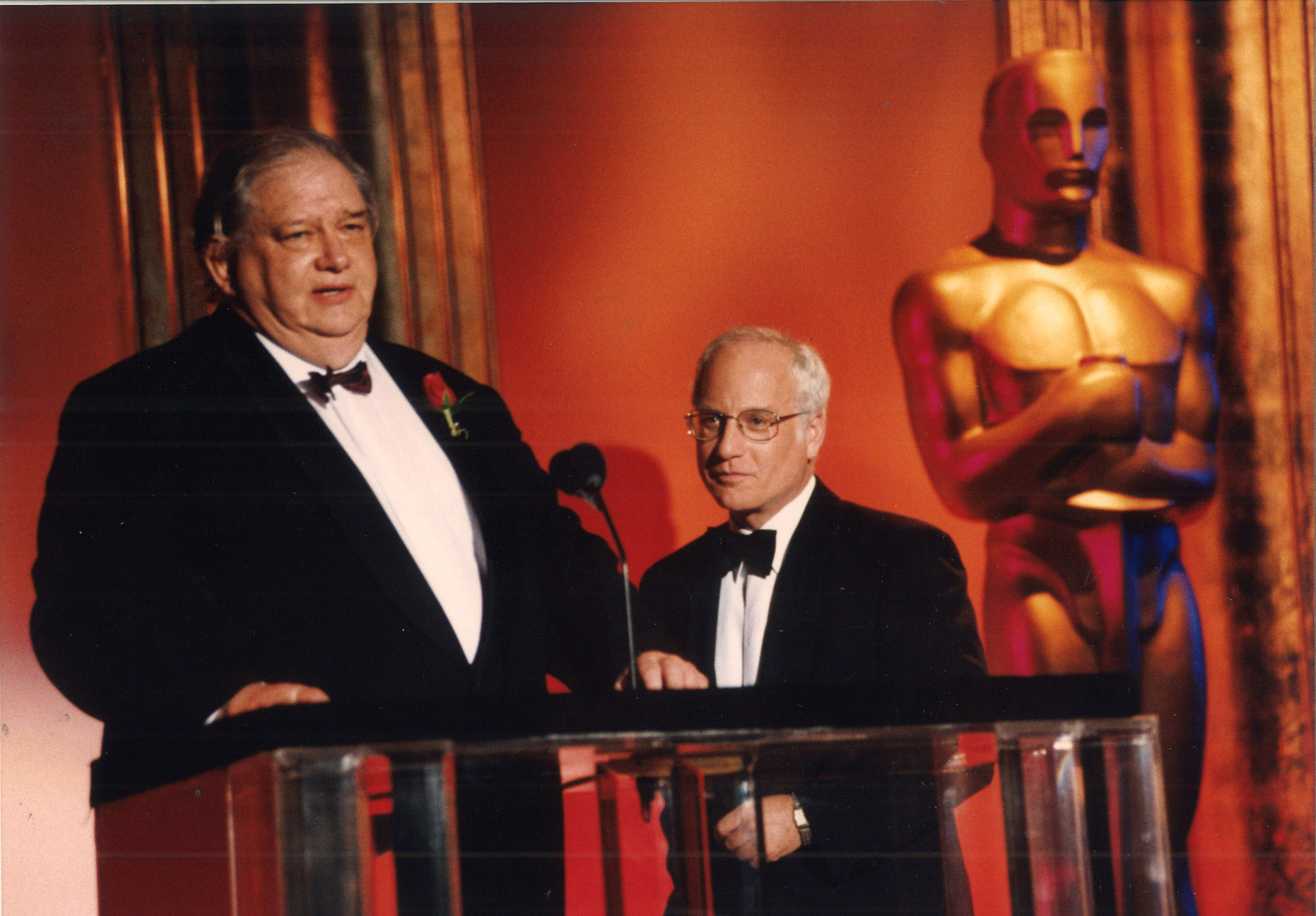
Denz along with award presenter Richard Dreyfuss at the Oscars in 1996

Peter Denz (14 January 1940 – 25 June 2022) was a German engineer, inventor, entrepreneur and Oscar winner.

== Biography ==
Denz was born in Freiburg. In 1970, engineering graduate Denz, who had previously studied aircraft construction in Zürich and Munich, established the Präzisions-Entwicklung DENZ Fertigungs-GmbH, which specialized in the development, manufacturing and distribution of high-tech precision products for the industry as well the development, production and distribution of cinematographic film and video products, and of which he was the shareholder and Managing Director.

Denz received the Academy Award for technical merits (Technical Achievement Award) by the Academy of Motion Picture Arts and Sciences (AMPAS) in 1996 for the development of a flicker-free color video camera.

== Honors (selection) ==
- 1984, iF product design award: Handlebar for remote control of zoom lenses for film cameras
- 1985, iF product design award: Control knob for electronic control of camera lenses
- 1986, iF product design award: Argus Viewfinder extension with Video Control System VCS
- 1987, iF product design award: deniz.belt underwater energy belt
- 1991, American Society of Lighting Designers Award: Video-Assist-System - digital, color
- 1996, Academy Award for technical merits (Technical Achievement Award): Development of a flicker-free color video camera, VCSC digital video control system
- 1996, Cinec Award in the category Camera Technology: VCSC digital 2000 Video-Control-System-Color
- 1999, American Society of Cinematographers (ASC) Award
- 2000, American Society of Cinematographers (ASC) Award
