= Journal of Biophotonics =

- Discipline: Biophotonics
- Language: English
- Edited by: Jürgen Popp

Publication details
- History: 2008–present
- Publisher: Wiley-VCH
- Frequency: Monthly
- Open access: Hybrid
- Impact factor: 3.207 (2020)

Standard abbreviations
- ISO 4: J. Biophotonics

Indexing
- CODEN: JBOIBX
- ISSN: 1864-063X (print); 1864-0648 (web)
- LCCN: 2016204600
- OCLC no.: 304302801

Links
- Journal homepage; Online access; Online archive

The Journal of Biophotonics is a monthly peer-reviewed scientific journal covering research on the interactions between light and biological material. It was established in 2008 by Jürgen Popp (Friedrich Schiller University Jena), Gert von Bally (Muenster, Germany), and Andreas Thoss (Berlin, Germany). The journal is published by Wiley-VCH and the editor-in-chief is Jürgen Popp.

In addition to regular submissions, the journal publishes topical issues on selected research areas, e.g. biophotonics in regenerative medicine and dermatology, optical coherence tomography, and therapeutic laser applications.

== Abstracting and indexing ==
The journal is abstracted and indexed in:

- BIOSIS Previews
- Current Contents
- Inspec
- MEDLINE/PubMed
- Science Citation Index Expanded
- Chemical Abstracts Service
- Scopus

According to the Journal Citation Reports, the journal has a 2020 impact factor of 3.207.
