= Claudia Draxl =

Physicist

Claudia Draxl is a physicist and academic. She is a full professor at the Humboldt University of Berlin in theoretical condensed matter physics.

== Life ==
From 1978 to 1983, Draxl studied mathematics and physics at the University of Graz. She received her doctorate at the University of Graz in theoretical physics in 1987. She finished her habilitation at University of Graz in 1996. From 1996 to 1997, she was a lecturer at the University of Graz. From 1997 to 1998, she was an associate professor at the University of Graz. She was the director of the Institute of Theoretical Physics at the University of Graz from 1999 to 2001, and the deputy director of the very same institute from 2001 to 2004. From 2005 to 2011, she was a university professor at the University of Leoben and had the chair for Atomistic Modelling and Design of Materials. Since 2011, she is a university professor at the Humboldt University of Berlin and has the chair of theoretical condensed matter physics.

== Research ==
Draxl's research focuses on condensed matter theory and computational materials science. Her main research topics are:

- Ab initio calculation of the properties of solids
- Density functional theory
- Many-body theory
- Theoretical spectroscopy
- Electron-phonon coupling
- Organic and inorganic semiconductors
- Hybrid materials & nanostructures
- Superconductivity

== Awards ==
Draxl has received several awards:

- Ludwig Boltzmann Prize from the Austrian Physical Society (OePG) in 1995
- Honorary doctorate from the Faculty of Science and Technology at Uppsala University, Sweden, in 2000
- Research award from the Federal State of Styria, Austria, in 2008
- Fellow of the American Physical Society in 2011
- Einstein Professor at the Humboldt-Universität zu Berlin in 2013
- Paracelsusring by the City of Villach in 2013
- Caroline von Humboldt Professorship in 2014
- Appointment as a Max Planck Fellow in 2014
- Corresponding member of the Austrian Academy of Sciences abroad in 2018

== Selected publications ==
- Cottenier, Stefaan; Zhang, Guo-Xu; Yates, Jonathan R.; Wills, John M.; van Speybroeck, Veronique; van Setten, Michiel J.; Vanderbilt, David; Torrent, Marc; Tkatchenko, Alexandre (2016-03-25). "Reproducibility in density functional theory calculations of solids". Science. 351 (6280) aad3000. Bibcode:2016Sci...351.....L. doi:10.1126/science.aad3000. hdl:1854/LU-7191263. ISSN 1095-9203. PMID 27013736.
- Ghiringhelli, Luca M.; Vybiral, Jan; Levchenko, Sergey V.; Draxl, Claudia; Scheffler, Matthias (2015-03-10). "Big Data of Materials Science: Critical Role of the Descriptor". Physical Review Letters. 114 (10) 105503. arXiv:1411.7437. Bibcode:2015PhRvL.114j5503G. doi:10.1103/PhysRevLett.114.105503. PMID 25815947. S2CID 1002247.
- Ramsey, M. G.; Netzer, F. P.; Ambrosch-Draxl, C.; Puschnig, P.; Oehzelt, M.; Berkebile, S.; Koller, G. (2007-07-20). "Intra- and Intermolecular Band Dispersion in an Organic Crystal". Science. 317 (5836): 351–355. Bibcode:2007Sci...317..351K. doi:10.1126/science.1143239. ISSN 1095-9203. PMID 17641196. S2CID 29207519.
- Ambrosch-Draxl, Claudia; Sofo, Jorge O. (2006-07-01). "Linear optical properties of solids within the full-potential linearized augmented planewave method". Computer Physics Communications. 175 (1): 1–14. arXiv:cond-mat/0402523. Bibcode:2006CoPhC.175....1A. doi:10.1016/j.cpc.2006.03.005. ISSN 0010-4655. S2CID 2349989.
- Ambrosch-Draxl, C.; Majewski, J. A.; Vogl, P.; Leising, G. (1995-04-15). "First-principles studies of the structural and optical properties of crystalline poly(para-phenylene)". Physical Review B. 51 (15): 9668–9676. Bibcode:1995PhRvB..51.9668A. doi:10.1103/PhysRevB.51.9668. PMID 9977632.
