= Cornelia Denz =

German physicist (born 1963)

- Born: 23 May 1963 (age 63)
- Education: Technische Universität Darmstadt; École supérieure d'optique
- Scientific career
- Workplaces: University of Münster, PTB

Cornelia Denz (born 23 May 1963) is a German Professor of Physics at the University of Münster. She works in nonlinear optics and nanophotonics, and is a Fellow of The Optical Society and The European Optical Society. Denz is the current president of the PTB.

== Early life and education ==
Denz was born in Frankfurt. She studied physics at the Technische Universität Darmstadt, where she earned her diploma in nonlinear optics in 1988. She remained there for her PhD, working on optical neural network and optical data storage. During her doctorate she worked at the École supérieure d'optique. In her early career she worked alongside Margit Zacharias, a Professor of Physics at the Freiburg Institute for Advanced Studies.

== Research and career ==
In 1993 Denz was made Head of the Photorefractive Group at Technische Universität Darmstadt. She moved to the University of Münster in 2001, where she leads the Nonlinear Photonics Group. She founded the Centre for Nonlinear Science (CeNoS) at the WWU University of Münster. She became Chair of Applied Physics and Head of the Institute in 2003.

Denz develops modern optical methods for structuring light and matter; which includes optical data storage and systems for information processing. She developed a compact holographic data storage system in which data is imprinted on a liquid crystal display onto a laser beam. The laser beam is superimposed on a separated reference beam, with the information being encoded on a hologram. The information is read in parallel and can permit high data transfer rates. For digital data, holographic storage allows for improved security and encryption. She is interested in developing single crystal data storage systems, and uses them as switching elements such as optical transistors.

She has worked on photonic crystals that use non-linear photorefractive materials. She demonstrated that optical induction could be used to produce quasicrystals, a chemical structure that has three-dimensional crystalline groups with spiral structures and defined defects. In CeNoS Denz uses nonlinear dynamics and chaos control, such as the control of cavity solitons and the generation of slow light.

In 2008 Denz began working with complex light fields; including non-diffractive and accelerating light fields, for the creation of holographic optical tweezers. She has used these light fields to manipulate nano and micro-scale particles.

=== Academic service ===
Denz has worked on activities promoting women in physics throughout her career. In 1993 she coordinated a travelling exhibition on women in physics, which started at Technische Universität Darmstadt. She organised a three-year program called Light Up Your Life, which introduced girls to science projects and career options. Denz founded the Minster Experimental Laboratory (MExLAb), through which she took part in science programs in schools as well as a research oriented school lab. In 2011 Denz planned a university-wide MExLab, MExLab ExperiMINTe, MINT being the German equivalent of the acronym STEM.

She organised the German Physical Society German Conference on Physics in 2009. In 2010, she was made Vice Rector for International and Young Academics. Denz is an editor for Physik Journal, Annalen der Physik and Advanced Optical Materials. In 2012, the Unicum publishing group selected her as the Professor of the Year. In 2015 Denz was awarded for the Lise-Meitner-Lecture in Berlin. She serves on the board of the German Society for Applied Optics. She is a Fellow of The Optical Society and European Optical Society.

=== Selected publications ===
Her publications include;

- Denz, Cornelia (1991). "Volume hologram multiplexing using a deterministic phase encoding method". Optics Communications. 85 (2–3): 171–176. Bibcode:1991OptCo..85..171D. doi:10.1016/0030-4018(91)90389-U.
- Denz, Cornelia (1998). Optical Neural Networks. Spriger. ISBN 9783663122722.
- Denz, Cornelia (2003). Transverse-Pattern Formation in Photorefractive Optics. Springer. ISBN 978-3540021094.

== Personal life ==
Denz is married with two sons.
