= Hans Primas =

Swiss chemist and university professor (1928–2014)

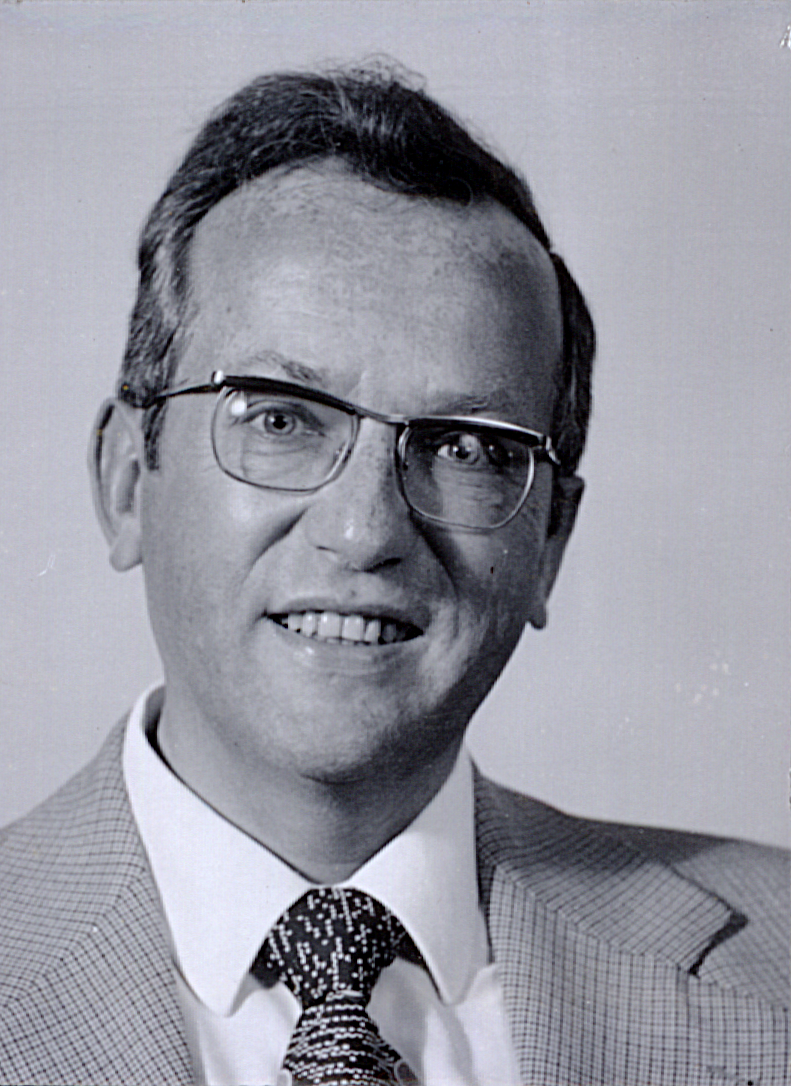
Hans Primas

Hans Primas (June 18, 1928, Zurich - October 6, 2014) was a Swiss theoretical chemist. From 1948 to 1951 Primas studied chemistry at the Zurich University of Applied Sciences (Technikum Winterthur). In 1961, after his habilitation, he became associate professor and in 1966 full professor of physical and theoretical chemistry at the ETH Zurich. In 1967-68 and from 1976 to 1978 he was the head of the Department of Chemistry at the ETH Zurich.

Primas was interested in the interpretation of quantum mechanics and in the philosophy of science, especially in connection to theoretical chemistry, and one treatise on the matter.
