= Cecilia Jarlskog =

Swedish physicist

- Born: 1941 (age 84–85)
- Education: Technical University of Lund
- Known for: Jarlskog invariant Georgi–Jarlskog mass relation
- Awards: Lisa Meitner Lecture (2009)
- Scientific career
- Fields: Physics

Cecilia Jarlskog (born in 1941) is a Swedish theoretical physicist, working mainly on elementary particle physics.

Jarlskog obtained her doctorate in 1970 in theoretical particle physics at the Technical University of Lund. She is known for her work on CP violation in the electroweak sector of the Standard Model, introducing what is known as the Jarlskog invariant, and for her work on grand unified theories (see Georgi–Jarlskog mass relation).

== Research interests ==
Cecilia Jarlskog is mainly known for her study and expertise in theoretical particle physics. Her studies include research on the ways that sub-atomic and electronic constituents of matter cohere or lose their symmetry, matter and antimatter asymmetry, mathematical physics, neutrino physics, and grand unification.

The Jarlskog invariant or rephasing-invariant CP violation parameter, is an invariant quantity in particle physics, which is in the order of ±2.8 × 10^{−5}. This parameter is related to the unitarity conditions of the Cabibbo–Kobayashi–Maskawa matrix, which can be expressed as triangles whose sides are products of different elements of the matrix. As such, the Jarlskog invariant can be written as J = ±Im(V_{us}V_{cb}V^{∗}_{ub}V^{∗}_{cs}), which amounts to twice the area of the unitarity triangle. Because the area vanishes for the specific parameters in the Standard Model for which there would be no CP violation, this invariant is thus very useful to quantify the non-conservation of the CP-symmetry in elementary particle physics. It is one of Jarlskog's foremost contributions to physics, the other being the many years that she was an active member of CERN.

She recalls her appreciation of CERN's (European Organization for Nuclear Research) international atmosphere. Being a part of this community gave her great opportunities to meet and talk with inspiring physicists from across the world. She noted that she felt fortunate to have 'lived in a period when the amount of information revealed about the nature of the elementary constituents of matter and their interactions has been mind-boggling'.

At CERN, the European Organization for Nuclear Research, physicists and engineers probe the fundamental structure of the universe. The world's largest and most complex scientific instruments are employed to study the basic constituents of matter – fundamental particles. The particles are caused to collide at close to the speed of light, which affords physicists clues about the interactions of particles, and insights into the fundamental laws of nature.

== Career ==
Jarlskog was appointed professor at the University of Bergen, Norway, in 1976. In 1985 she switched to the Stockholm University, Sweden, staying there until 1994. Since then, Jarlskog has been a professor at Lund University, her alma mater, where she had graduated in 1970 with a PhD in theoretical particle physics.

Jarlskog worked as a member of CERN from 1970 to 1972. In addition, she served on the CERN Scientific Policy committee from 1982 to 1988. In her remaining 6 years at CERN, she served as the Advisor to the Director General of CERN on Member States, from 1998 to 2004. Jarlskog was recognized by the Swedish Academy of Science community and was appointed as one of the 5 members of the Swedish Nobel Committee for Physics from 1989 to 2000, serving as chairman of that committee in 1999, when the prize was awarded to Gerard 't Hooft and Martinus J. G. Veltman.

In 2023, Cecilia Jarlskog was given the EPS High Energy and Particle Physics Prize, which is awarded by the European Physical Society for outstanding contributions in experimental, theoretical or technological achievements. Jarlskog's prize was due to her "discovery of an invariant measure of CP violation in both quark and lepton sectors." In 2025, she received Lund University's Silver Medal, an award that recognises individuals who make particularly significant contributions to the university and society. When presenting her with the medal, Lund University noted "a researcher who is profoundly shaping her field and at the same time strengthening the university's international standing."

Jarlskog is an Honorary Professor at three universities in China and received an honorary degree from the University College Dublin. She was also Member of the Swedish Academy of Sciences (1984), Member of the Norwegian Academy of Sciences (1987), Member of the Board of Trustees of the Nobel Foundation (1996) and Member of the Academia Europaea (2005).

== Books and articles ==
Cecilia Jarlskog wrote the book, Portrait of Gunnar Källén: A Physics Shooting Star and Poet of Early Quantum Field Theory, while a member of CERN. Here she relates the accomplishments of a comparatively unknown physicist in quantum physics. Jarlskog has written many articles in her lifetime, among them are "Invariations of Lepton Mass Matrices and CP and T violation in Neutrino Oscillations", "On the Wings of Physics" and "Ambiguities Pertaining to Quark-Lepton Complementarity."
