= Susanne Teschl =

Austrian biomathematician

Susanne Teschl (née Timischl, born 1971) is an Austrian biomathematician and professor of mathematics at the University of Applied Sciences Technikum Wien in Vienna. She is known for her research on the mathematical modeling of breath analysis.

== Education and career ==
Teschl earned a diploma in mathematical physics at the University of Graz in 1995, and completed her Ph.D. there in 1998. Her dissertation, A Global Model for the Cardiovascular and Respiratory System, was supervised by Franz Kappel.

After working for the Austrian Science Fund, she joined the University of Applied Sciences Technikum Wien in 2001, and headed the Department of Applied Mathematics and Natural Sciences there from 2007 to 2010.

== Personal life ==
Teschl is the daughter of Wolfgang Timischl, an Austrian mathematics teacher and textbook author. Her husband, Gerald Teschl, is a mathematical physicist at the University of Vienna.
