= Helge Holden =

Norwegian mathematician

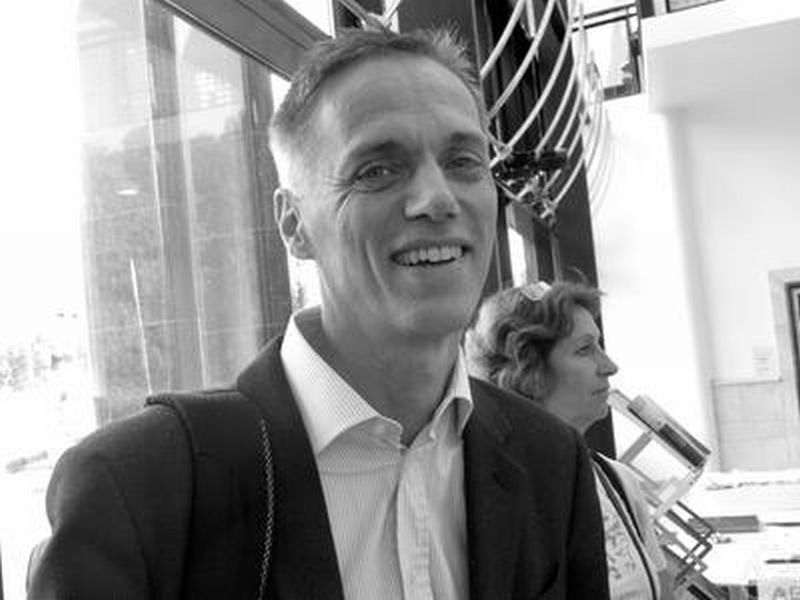
- Helge Holden, Oslo 2012
- Born: 28 September 1956 (age 69); Oslo, Norway
- Education: University of Oslo
- Scientific career
- Fields: Mathematics
- Workplaces: Norwegian University of Science and Technology
- Doctoral advisor: Raphael Høegh-Krohn

Helge Holden (born 28 September 1956) is a Norwegian mathematician working in the field of differential equations and mathematical physics. He was Praeses of the Royal Norwegian Society of Sciences and Letters from 2014 to 2016.

He earned the dr.philos. degree at the University of Oslo in 1985. The title of his dissertation with Raphael Høegh-Krohn was Point Interactions and the Short-Range Expansion. A Solvable Model in Quantum Mechanics and Its Approximation. He was appointed professor at the Norwegian Institute of Technology (now: the Norwegian University of Science and Technology ) in 1991. His research interests are Differential equations, mathematical physics (in particular hyperbolic conservation laws and completely integrable systems), Stochastic analysis, and flow in porous media.

In 2014 he became Chairman of the board of the Abel Prize fund.

He was elected Secretary General of the International Mathematical Union (IMU) for the period 2019–2022.

== Awards and honors ==
He is a member of the Royal Norwegian Society of Sciences and Letters, the Norwegian Academy of Science and Letters and of the Norwegian Academy of Technological Sciences.

In 2013 he became a fellow of the American Mathematical Society, for "contributions to partial differential equations". He was elected as a fellow of the Society for Industrial and Applied Mathematics in 2017, "for contributions to nonlinear partial differential equations and related fields, to research administration, and to the dissemination of mathematics".

In 2022 he was awarded the Gunnerus Medal for his academic achievement. The Gunnerus Medal is awarded by The Royal Norwegian Society of Sciences and Letters.
