= Medical University of Innsbruck =

Public university in Austria

Coordinates: 47°15′44″N 11°23′08″E

- Medizinische Universität Innsbruck
- Type: Public
- Established: 2004
- Endowment: €260 million
- President: Gert Mayer
- Students: ca. 3,800
- Location: Innsbruck, Austria
- Website: www.i-med.ac.at

The Medical University of Innsbruck (German: Medizinische Universität Innsbruck) is a university in Innsbruck, Austria. It used to be one of the four historical faculties of the Leopold-Franzens-Universität Innsbruck and became an independent university in 2004.

== History ==
The medical tradition dates back long before the foundation of the university, with the foundation of the first hospital in the nearby silver-mining city Schwaz in 1307. A medical faculty was included in the initial university, established in 1669 by emperor Leopold I.

== Ceremonial equipment ==
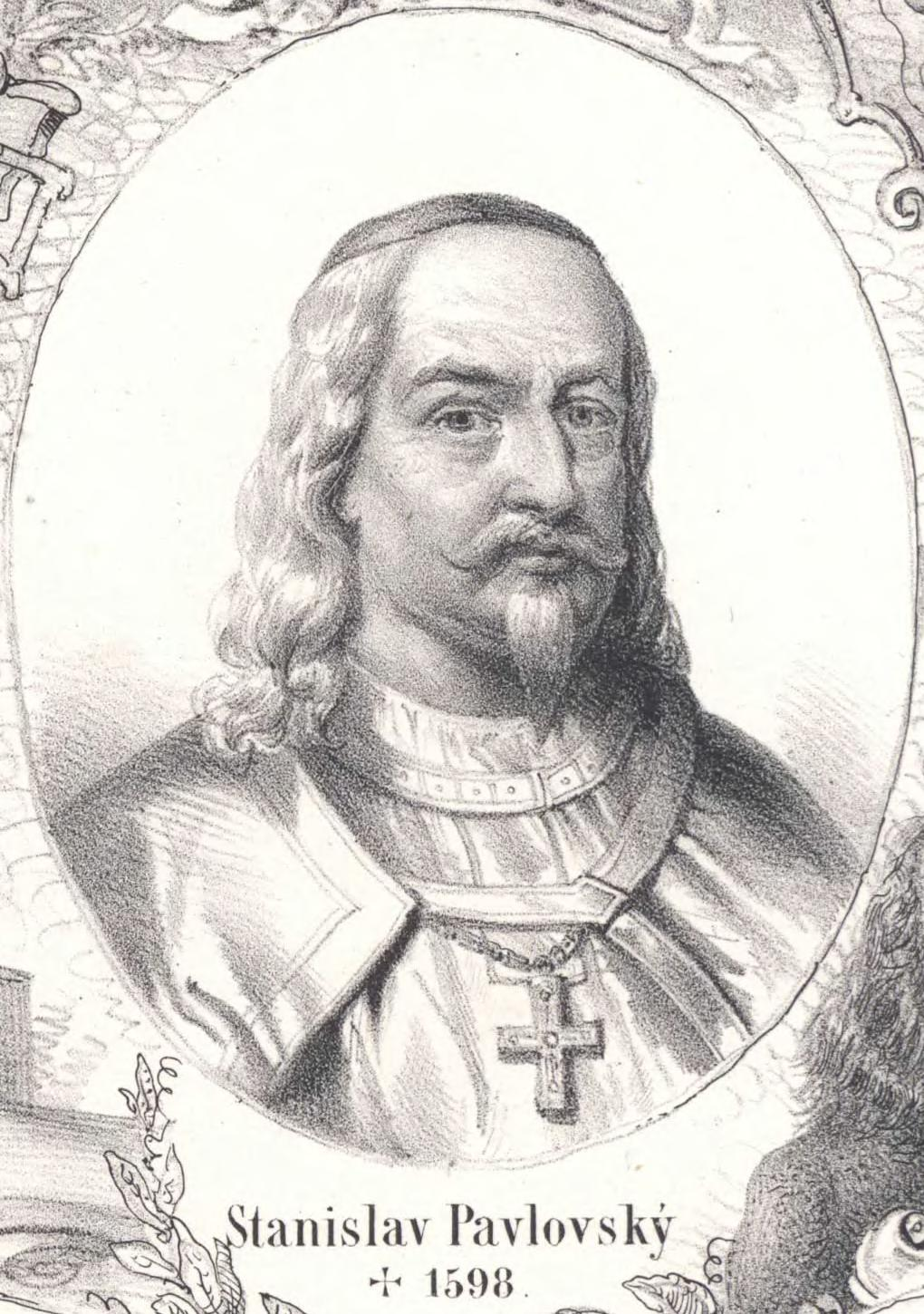
Bishop Stanislav Pavlovský, who donated the mace now held by Innsbruck to the University of Olomouc in 1588

In the 1850s the Habsburgs gradually closed the University of Olomouc as a consequence of the Olomouc students' and professors' participation on the 1848 revolutions and the Czech National Revival. The ceremonial equipment of the University of Olomouc was then transferred to the University of Innsbruck. The original Olomouc ceremonial maces from the 1580s are now used as maces of the University of Innsbruck, its faculties and of the Medical University of Innsbruck. The Medical University uses the ceremonial mace of Olomouc Faculty of Philosophy from 1588 and Olomouc Rector's Chain made sometime between 1566 and 1573.

The ceremonial mace currently used by the Medical University of Innsbruck was given by Olomouc bishop Stanislav Pavlovský to the University of Olomouc in ca. 1588. It is 163 centimeters high, it is made of silver and has gold plating. It bears inscription S. P. E. O. (Stanislaus Pawlowski Episcopus Olomucii) and other ornaments.

Within the framework of the University Act of 2002, the medical faculty was separated from the Leopold-Franzens University, and the Medical University of Innsbruck was established as a university in its own right. Today, the Med-Uni has some 3,000 students and 1,800 employees. It is the most important medical research and training facility in western Austria and the home university of many Tyroleans, South Tyroleans and students from the Province of Vorarlberg.

== Nobel Prize laureates ==
- Fritz Pregl, 1923 (chemistry - for his contributions to quantitative organic microanalysis)
- Adolf Windaus, 1928 (chemistry - for his work on sterols and their relation to vitamins)
- Hans Fischer, 1930 (chemistry - for the synthesis of haemin)
