= Austrian Physical Society =

- Österreichische Physikalische Gesellschaft
- Abbreviation: ÖPG
- Formation: Dec. 13th, 1950
- Type: Scientific
- Purpose: Research
- Location: Austria
- President: Maurizio Musso
- Executive Director: Hermann Detz
- Website: http://www.oepg.at/

The Austrian Physical Society (German: Österreichische Physikalische Gesellschaft) is the national physical society of Austria.

== History ==
Until 1938, Austrian physicists were part of the German Physical Society. On 13 December 1950, it was decided to found a separate society for Austria and Fritz Kohlrausch was elected as first president in 1951.

== Prizes ==
Every year it awards a prize to a promising young physicist. Alternating every year, this is the Ludwig Boltzmann Prize for theoretical physics and the Fritz Kohlrausch Prize for experimental physics.

== See also ==
- Lise Meitner Lectures
