= Quantum Trajectory Theory =

Formulation of quantum mechanics

Quantum Trajectory Theory (QTT) is a formulation of quantum mechanics used for simulating open quantum systems, quantum dissipation and single quantum systems. It was developed by Howard Carmichael in the early 1990s around the same time as the similar formulation, known as the quantum jump method or Monte Carlo wave function (MCWF) method, developed by Dalibard, Castin and Mølmer. Other contemporaneous works on wave-function-based Monte Carlo approaches to open quantum systems include those of Dum, Zoller and Ritsch, and Hegerfeldt and Wilser.

QTT is compatible with the standard formulation of quantum theory, as described by the Schrödinger equation, but it offers a more detailed view. The Schrödinger equation can be used to compute the probability of finding a quantum system in each of its possible states should a measurement be made. This approach is fundamentally statistical and is useful for predicting average measurements of large ensembles of quantum objects but it does not describe or provide insight into the behaviour of individual particles. QTT fills this gap by offering a way to describe the trajectories of individual quantum particles that obey the probabilities computed from the Schrödinger equation. Like the quantum jump method, QTT applies to open quantum systems that interact with their environment. QTT has become particularly popular since the technology has been developed to efficiently control and monitor individual quantum systems as it can predict how individual quantum objects such as particles will behave when they are observed.

== Method ==
In QTT open quantum systems are modelled as scattering processes, with classical external fields corresponding to the inputs and classical stochastic processes corresponding to the outputs (the fields after the measurement process). The mapping from inputs to outputs is provided by a quantum stochastic process that is set up to account for a particular measurement strategy (e.g., photon counting, homodyne/heterodyne detection, etc.). The calculated system state as a function of time is known as a quantum trajectory, and the desired density matrix as a function of time may be calculated by averaging over many simulated trajectories.

Like other Monte Carlo approaches, QTT provides an advantage over direct master-equation approaches by reducing the number of computations required. For a Hilbert space of dimension N, the traditional master equation approach would require calculation of the evolution of N^{2} atomic density matrix elements, whereas QTT only requires N calculations. This makes it useful for simulating large open quantum systems.

The idea of monitoring outputs and building measurement records is fundamental to QTT. This focus on measurement distinguishes it from the quantum jump method which has no direct connection to monitoring output fields. When applied to direct photon detection the two theories produce equivalent results. Where the quantum jump method predicts the quantum jumps of the system as photons are emitted, QTT predicts the "clicks" of the detector as photons are measured. The only difference is the viewpoint.

QTT is also broader in its application than the quantum jump method as it can be applied to many different monitoring strategies including direct photon detection and heterodyne detection. Each different monitoring strategy offers a different picture of the system dynamics.

== Applications ==
There have been two distinct phases of applications for QTT. Like the quantum jump method, QTT was first used for computer simulations of large quantum systems. These applications exploit its ability to significantly reduce the size of computations, which was especially necessary in the 1990s when computing power was very limited.

The second phase of application has been catalysed by the development of technologies to precisely control and monitor single quantum systems. In this context QTT is being used to predict and guide single quantum system experiments including those contributing to the development of quantum computers.

It has also been shown that quantum trajectories have full and universal quantum computational power.

== Quantum measurement problem ==
QTT addresses one aspect of the measurement problem in quantum mechanics by providing a detailed description of the intermediate steps through which a quantum state approaches the final, measured state during the so-called "collapse of the wave function". It reconciles the concept of a quantum jump with the smooth evolution described by the Schrödinger equation. The theory suggests that "quantum jumps" are not instantaneous but happen in a coherently driven system as a smooth transition through a series of superposition states. This prediction was tested experimentally in 2019 by a team at Yale University led by Michel Devoret and Zlatko Minev, in collaboration with Carmichael and others at Yale University and the University of Auckland. In their experiment they used a superconducting artificial atom to observe a quantum jump in detail, confirming that the transition is a continuous process that unfolds over time. They were also able to detect when a quantum jump was about to occur and intervene to reverse it, sending the system back to the state in which it started. This experiment, inspired and guided by QTT, represents a new level of control over quantum systems and has potential applications in correcting errors in quantum computing in the future.
