= Mølmer–Sørensen gate =

Trapped-ion quantum gate

In quantum computing, Mølmer–Sørensen gate scheme (or MS gate) refers to an implementation procedure for various multi-qubit quantum logic gates used mostly in trapped ion quantum computing. This procedure is based on the original proposition by Klaus Mølmer and Anders Sørensen in 1999–2000.

This proposal was an alternative to the 1995 Cirac–Zoller controlled-NOT gate implementation for trapped ions, which requires that the system be restricted to the joint motional ground state of the ions.

In an MS gate, entangled states are prepared by illuminating ions with a bichromatic light field. Mølmer and Sørensen identified two regimes in which this is possible:

1. A weak-field regime, where single-photon absorption is suppressed and two-photon processes interfere in a way that makes internal state dynamics insensitive to the vibrational state
2. A strong-field regime where the individual ions are coherently excited, and the motional state is highly entangled with the internal state until all undesirable excitations are deterministically removed toward the end of the interaction.

In both regimes, a red and blue sideband interaction are applied simultaneously to each ion, with the red and blue tones symmetrically detuned by $\delta'$ from the sidebands. This results in laser detunings $\pm (\omega_k + \delta')$, where $\omega_k$ is the motional mode frequency.

When an MS gate is applied globally to all ions in a chain, multipartite entanglement is created, with the form of the gate being a sum of local XX (or YY, or XY depending on experimental parameters) interactions applied to all qubit pairs. When the gate is performed on a single pair of ions, it reduces to the R_{XX} gate. Thus, the CNOT gate can be decomposed into an MS gate and combination of single particle rotations.

== History ==
Trapped ions were identified by Ignacio Cirac and Peter Zoller at the University of Innsbruck, Austria in 1995, as the first realistic system with which to implement a quantum computer, in a proposal which included a procedure for implementing a CNOT gate by coupling ions through their collective motion. A major drawback of Cirac and Zoller's scheme was that it required the trapped ion system to be restricted to its joint motional ground state, which is difficult to achieve experimentally. The Cirac-Zoller CNOT gate was not experimentally demonstrated with two ions until 8 years later, in 2003, with a fidelity of 70-80%. Around 1998, there was a collective effort to develop two-qubit gates independent of the motional state of individual ions, one of which was the scheme proposed by Klaus Mølmer and Anders Sørensen in Aarhus University, Denmark.

In 1999, Mølmer and Sørensen proposed a native multi-qubit trapped ion gate as an alternative to Cirac and Zoller's scheme, insensitive to the vibrational state of the system and robust against changes in the vibrational number during gate operation. Mølmer and Sørensen's scheme requires only that the ions be in the Lamb-Dicke regime, and it produces an Ising-like interaction Hamiltonian using a bichromatic laser field.

Following Mølmer and Sørensen's 1999 papers, Gerard J. Milburn proposed a 2-qubit gate that makes use of a stroboscopic Hamiltonian in order to couple internal state operators to different quadrature components. Soon after, in 2000, Mølmer and Sørensen published a third article illustrating that their 1999 scheme was already a realization of Milburn's, just with a harmonic rather than stroboscopic application of the Hamiltonian coupling terms.

Mølmer and Sørensen's 2000 article also takes a more general approach to the gate scheme compared to the 1999 proposal. In the 1999 papers, only the "slow gate" regime is considered, in which a large detuning from resonance is required to avoid off-resonant coupling to unwanted phonon modes. In 2000, Mølmer and Sørensen remove this restriction and show how to remove phonon number dependence in the "fast gate" regime, where lasers are tuned close to the sidebands.

The first experimental demonstration of the MS gate was performed in 2000 by David J. Wineland's group at the National Institute of Standards and Technology (NIST), with fidelities of F= .83 for 2 ions and F=.57 for 4 ions. In 2003, Wineland's group produced better results by using a geometric phase gate, which is a specific case of the more general formalism put forward by Mølmer, Sørensen, Milburn, and Xiaoguang Wang. Today, the MS gate is widely used and accepted as the standard by trapped ion groups (and companies), and optimizing and generalizing MS gates is currently an active field in the trapped ion community. MS-like gates have also been developed for other quantum computing platforms.

== Description ==
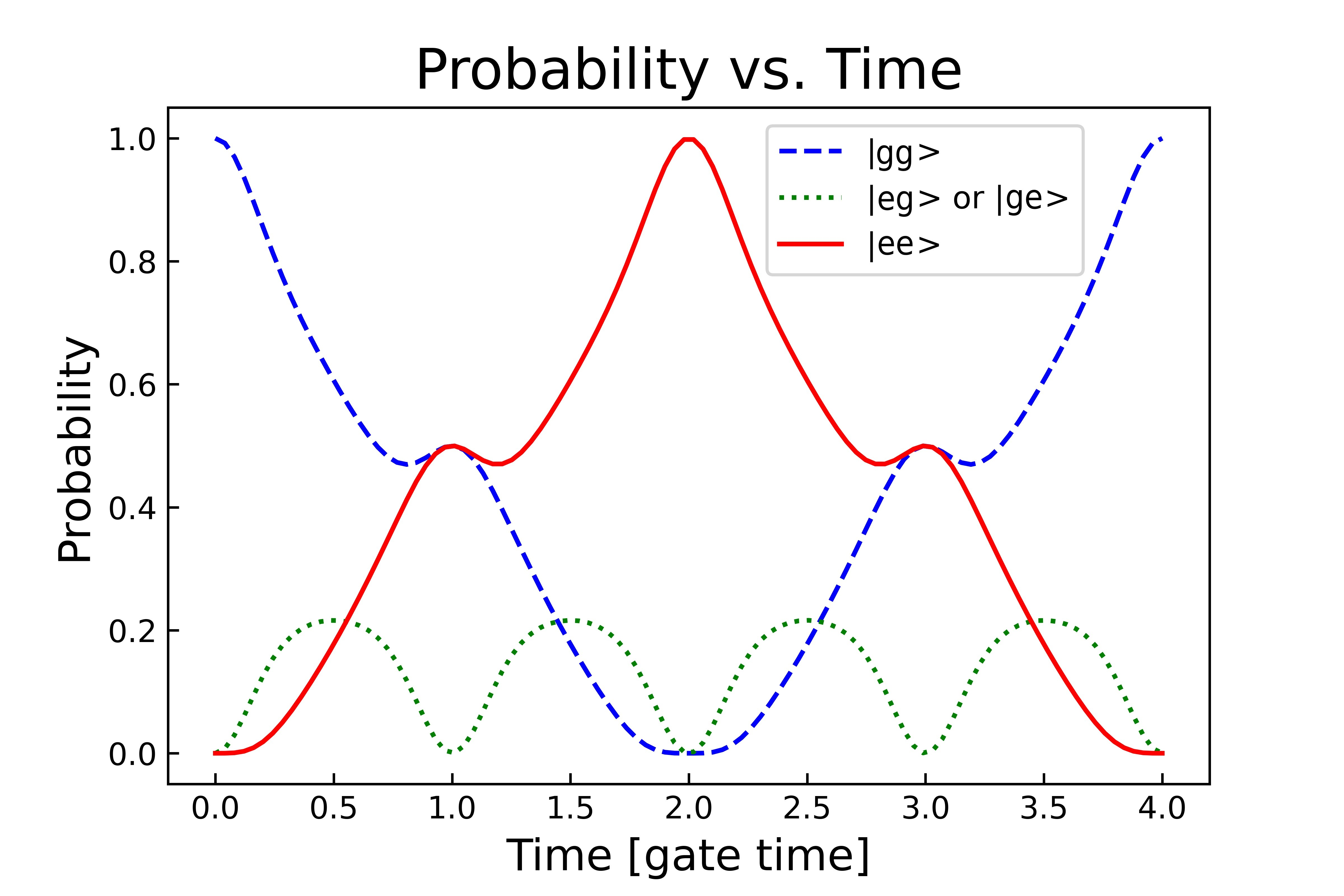
The qubit occupation over four gate cycles.

To implement the scheme, two ions are irradiated with a bichromatic laser field with frequencies $\omega_{eg} \pm \delta$, where $\hbar\omega_{eg}$ is the energy splitting of the qubit states and $\delta = \omega_k + \delta'$ is a detuning close to the motional frequency $\omega_k$ of the ions. Depending on the interaction time, this produces the states

$$\begin{align}\mid ee\rangle\rightarrow(|ee\rangle+i|gg\rangle)/\sqrt{2}\\
\mid eg\rangle\rightarrow(|eg\rangle-i|ge\rangle)/\sqrt{2}\\
\mid ge\rangle\rightarrow(|ge\rangle-i|eg\rangle)/\sqrt{2}\\
\mid gg\rangle\rightarrow(|gg\rangle+i|ee\rangle)/\sqrt{2}
\end{align}$$

The above is equivalent to the Ising coupling gate R_{yy}(π/2); It can then be shown that this gate (along with arbitrary single-qubit rotation) produces a universal set of gates.

An alternative definition of MS gate equates it to R_{xx}(π/2), and is adopted as IonQ's native gate for two-qubit entanglement. In this definition, CNOT gate can be decomposed as

$$\begin{align}
\mbox{CNOT} &=e^{-i\frac{\pi}{4}(I-Z_1)(I-X_2)}\\
&=R_{y_1}(-\pi/2)e^{-i\frac{\pi}{4}(I-X_1)(I-X_2)}R_{y_1}(\pi/2)\\
&=R_{y_1}(-\pi/2)e^{-i\frac{\pi}{4}}e^{i\frac{\pi}{4}(X_1+X_2-X_1\otimes X_2)}R_{y_1}(\pi/2)\\
&=e^{-i\frac{\pi}{4}}R_{y_1}(-\pi/2)R_{x_1}(-\pi/2)R_{x_2}(-\pi/2)R_{xx}(\pi/2)R_{y_1}(\pi/2)
\end{align}$$

The Mølmer–Sørensen gate implementation has the advantage that it does not fail if the ions were not cooled completely to the ground state, and it does not require the ions to be individually addressed. However, this thermal insensitivity is only valid in the Lamb–Dicke regime, so most implementations first cool the ions to the motional ground state. An experiment was done by P.C. Haljan, K. A. Brickman, L. Deslauriers, P.J. Lee, and C. Monroe where this gate was used to produce all four Bell states and to implement Grover's algorithm successfully.

== Interaction Hamiltonian derivation ==
=== Laser-atom Hamiltonian ===
The relevant Hamiltonian for a single trapped ion consists of the interaction between a spin-1/2 system, a harmonic oscillator trapping potential, and an external laser radiation field:

$$\begin{align}
H &= H_0 + H_I\\
&= (H_{\rm spin} + H_{\rm HO})+H_{\rm field}\\
&= -\hbar \frac{\omega_{ge}}{2} \sigma_z + \hbar \omega_{0}(a^\dagger a + \frac{1}{2}) - \vec{\mu_e} \cdot \vec{E}.
\end{align}$$

Here, $\omega_{ge}$ is the energy splitting between qubit states $| 0 \rangle$ and $| 1 \rangle$, $a^\dagger$ and $a$ are the creation and annihilation operators of phonons in the ions' collective motional mode, $\hbar\omega_0$ is the energy of those phonons, and $\sigma_{z}$ is the Pauli Z matrix.

The third term, the interaction Hamiltonian, can be written

$$\begin{align}
H_I &=-\vec{\mu_E} \cdot \vec{E} \\
&=  \Omega \sigma_x \cos(kz - \omega_L t + \phi)\\
&= \frac{\Omega}{2}(\sigma_+ + \sigma_-)(e^{i(\eta(a + a^\dagger) - \omega_L t + \phi)} + e^{-i(\eta(a + a^\dagger) - \omega_L t + \phi)})\\
\end{align}$$

for an $x-$polarized laser propagating along $z$. Here, we have defined the Rabi frequency $\Omega = -\mu_E E$ (dimensions of energy), as well as the operator for center-of-mass motion in the $z$-direction $z = z_0(a + a^\dagger)$. Here, $z_0 = (\hbar/2m \omega_z)^{1/2}$ is the spread of the zero-point wavefunction, $m$ is the ion mass, and the Lamb-Dicke parameter $\eta=k z_0$ parameterizes the size of the ground state wavepacket compared to radiation wavelength $\lambda = 2 \pi k$.

Now we will move into the interaction picture with respect to $H_{\rm HO}$ and $H_{\rm spin}$ and make a rotating wave approximation to get

$H_I = \frac{\Omega}{2} \sigma_- e^{-i(\eta(ae^{-i\omega_0 t}+a^\dagger e^{i \omega_0 t})- \delta t)} + h.c.$

where we have detuned the laser by $\delta$ from the qubit frequency $\omega_{ge}$ and absorbed the phase into the Rabi frequency $\Omega \rightarrow \Omega e^{i \Delta \phi}$.

Within the Lamb-Dicke regime, we can make the approximation

$e^{-i \eta (e^{i \omega_{0} t} a^{\dagger}+e^{-i \omega_{0} t} a)} \approx 1- i \eta (e^{i \omega_{0} t} a^{\dagger}+e^{-i \omega_{0} t} a)$

which splits the Hamiltonian into three parts corresponding to a carrier transition, red sideband (RSB) transition, and blue sideband (BSB) transition:

$H_I = \frac{\Omega}{2} \sigma_- (e^{i \delta t} - i \eta e^{i (\delta + \omega_{0})t}a^{\dagger} - i \eta e^{i (\delta - \omega_{0})t}a) + h.c.$

By making a second rotating wave approximation to neglect oscillation terms, each piece can be examined independently. For $\delta = 0$, only the first term is kept, and the Hamiltonian becomes $H_{\rm carrier} = \frac{\Omega}{2}(\sigma_- + \sigma_+),$ which alters the spin state of the ion without affecting its motional state. For $\delta = -\omega_0$, only the second term is kept since $|\delta + \omega_0| \ll |\delta|, |\delta - \omega_0|$. Then the red sideband (RSB) Hamiltonian is

$H_{\rm RSB} = -i \eta \frac{\Omega}{2} (a^{\dagger} \sigma_-) e^{i(\delta + \omega_{0})t} + h.c.$

The RSB transition can be thought of as an `exchange' of motion for spin. For an ion with phonon occupation number $n$, an RSB $\pi$-pulse will take $|g, n \rangle \rightarrow |e, n-1 \rangle$ with oscillation frequency $\Omega_{\rm RSB} = \eta \Omega \sqrt{n}$.

For $\delta = \omega_0$, only the third term is kept since $|\delta - \omega_0| \ll |\delta|, |\delta + \omega_0|$. Then the blue sideband (BSB) Hamiltonian is

$H_{\rm BSB} = -i \eta \frac{\Omega}{2} (a \sigma_-) e^{i(\delta - \omega_{0})t} +h.c.$

which is also a spin-motion exchange. For an ion with phonon occupation number $n$, a BSB $\pi$-pulse will take $|g, n \rangle \rightarrow |e, n+1 \rangle$ with oscillation frequency $\Omega_{\rm BSB} = \eta \Omega \sqrt{n+1}$.

=== Mølmer-Sørensen Hamiltonian ===
The MS Hamiltonian is the application of simultaneous, symmetrically detuned red and blue sideband tones over $j$ ions. Written in the interaction picture with respect to $H_{\rm spin}$,

$H_{\rm MS} = \sum_j H_{\rm HO} + H_{\rm carrier} + H_{\rm RSB} + H_{\rm BSB}$

where the single-ion Hamiltonians (in the rotating-wave approximation with respect to $H_{\rm HO}$ and counter-rotating terms) are given by

$$\begin{align}
H_{\rm carrier} &= \left( \frac{\Omega_R}{2} e^{i \delta_R t} + \frac{\Omega_B}{2} e^{i \delta_B t} \right) \sigma_- + h.c. \\
H_{\rm RSB} &= i \eta \frac{\Omega_R}{2} \sigma_- a^{\dagger} e^{i \delta_R t} + h.c.\\
H_{\rm BSB} &= i \eta \frac{\Omega_B}{2} \sigma_- a e^{i \delta_B t} +  h.c.
\end{align}$$

The red and blue tones have the effective Rabi frequencies $\Omega_R = \Omega e^{i \phi_R}$ and $\Omega_B = \Omega e^{i \phi_B}$, respectively.

To be thorough, we will also sum over all $k$ motional modes ($N$ ions $\times$ $d$ motional dimensions), each with eigenvector $b^k$ and eigenfrequency $\omega_k$. The red and blue tones are symmetrically detuned by $\delta'$ from the sidebands, results in laser detunings $\pm (\omega_k + \delta')$. We also assume that the tones are detuned near a motional mode which is far from the carrier such that the RWA is invoked to drop $H_{\rm carrier}$.

We define $\mu \equiv \delta_B = -\delta_R$ and write the detuning from each motional mode as $\mu_k = \mu - \delta'$.

Under the preceding assumptions, the MS interaction Hamiltonian (with respect to $H_{\rm HO}$) becomes

$H_{\rm int} = i \sum_{j, k} \eta_{j, k} \frac{\Omega_{j}}{2} \sigma_{-, j} [a_k e^{-i (\mu_k t - \phi_R)} + a_k ^\dagger e^{i (\mu_k t + \phi_B)}] + h.c.$

where $\eta_{j,k} = \Delta k \sqrt{\hbar/(2 M \omega_k)}b_j^k$. Now we define spin and motional phases

$\phi_s \equiv \frac{\phi_B+\phi_R}{2} \text{ }, \text{ } \phi_m \equiv \frac{\phi_B-\phi_R}{2}$

such that the Hamiltonian can be separated into its spin and motional components:

$$\begin{align}
H_{\rm int} &= i \sum_{j, k} \eta_{j, k} \frac{\Omega_j}{2} [e^{i (\mu_k t + \phi_B)} \sigma_{-, j} a_k - e^{-(\mu_k t + \phi_B)} \sigma_{+, j} a_k^{\dagger} + e^{-i (\mu_k t + \phi_R)} \sigma_{-, j} a_k^{\dagger} - e^{i (\mu_k t - \phi_R)} \sigma_{+, j} a_k]\\
&= i \sum_{j, k} \eta_{j, k} \frac{\Omega_j}{2} [(\sigma_{-, j} e^{i \phi_s} - \sigma_{+, j} e^{-i \phi_s})(a_k e^{i \mu_k t}e^{i \phi_m} + a_k^{\dagger} e^{-i \mu_k t}e^{-i \phi_m})]\\
&\equiv i \sum_{j, k} \eta_{j, k} \frac{\Omega_j}{2} [\hat{\sigma}_j \otimes \hat{A}_k(t)]
\end{align}$$

where we have now defined the spin operator $\hat{\sigma}_j$ and displacement operator $\hat{A}_k(t)$.

=== Time evolution operator ===
The time evolution operator is obtained through the Magnus expansion

$U(t) = e^{\sum_{l=1}^{\infty} M_l(t)}$

where the first two $M_l(t)$ are

$$\begin{align}
M_1(t) &= -\frac{i}{\hbar} \int_0^t H_{\rm int}(t_1) dt_1 \\
M_2(t) &= \frac{1}{2}(-\frac{i}{\hbar})^2 \int_0^t \int_0^{t_1} [H_{\rm int}(t_1), H_{\rm int}(t_2)]  dt_2 dt_1
\end{align}$$

and higher order terms vanish for the MS Hamiltonian since $[M_2(t_1), H_{\rm int}(t_2)] = 0.$

The first order term is

$M_1(t) = \sum_{j, k} \hat{\sigma_j}[\alpha_{j, k}(t) a_k + \alpha_{j, k}^*(t) a_k^{\dagger}]$

where $\alpha_k(t) = \eta_{j, k} (\Omega_j/2\mu_k) e^{i \mu_k t/2} \sin (\mu_k t/2) e^{i \phi_m}$ describes the displacement of the $k^{th}$ motional mode through phase space.

In the weak field regime, where $\eta \Omega \ll \mu$, this term can be neglected, as the phase space trajectory consists of very small, fast loops about the origin.

The second order term is

$M_2(t) = i \sum_{i<j, k} \hat{\sigma_i} \hat{\sigma_j} \frac{\eta_{i, k} \eta_{j, k}\Omega_i \Omega_j}{2 \mu_k}(\mu_k t - \sin(\mu_k t))$

over ion pairs $\{i, j\}$.

If we set the phases such that $\phi_R = 0$ and $\phi_B = \pi$ then $\hat{\sigma} \rightarrow -\sigma_x$.

== Gate properties ==
The time evolution of the state of a two qubit implementation of the Mølmer-Sørensen fast gate over two gate times from the ions starting in the ground state. States are labelled first by the qubit of each ion and then by the phonon occupancy of the motional mode. The grey circle represents a probability of 1/2 of that state.

=== Strong-field (fast gate) regime ===
In the strong field regime, ions are coherently excited and the motional state is highly entangled with the internal state until all undesirable excitations are deterministically removed toward the end of the interaction. Care must be taken to end the gate at a time when all motional modes have returned to the origin in phase space, and so the gate time is defined by $\alpha = 0 \longrightarrow \mu_k t_{\rm gate} = 2 \pi$ for each mode $k$.

For $\mu_k t = 2\pi$, the second term of $M_2(t)$ also vanishes, and so the time evolution operator becomes

$U_{\rm fast}(t_{\rm gate}) = \exp[i \frac{\pi}{2} \sum_{i<j. k} \frac{\eta_{i, k} \eta_{j, k} \Omega_i \Omega_j}{\mu_k^2} \hat{\sigma}_i \hat{\sigma}_j].$

=== Weak-field (slow gate) regime ===
Mølmer and Sørensen's original proposition considers operations in the limit $\eta \Omega \ll \omega_k - \delta$. In this 'weak-field regime', there is insensitivity to vibrational state and robustness against changes in vibrational motion throughout the entire gate operation, due to exploiting two important effects of quantum mechanics:

1. Vibrational degrees of freedom will enter the scheme only virtually. They are crucial as intermediate states, but population is never transferred to states with different vibrational excitations. This is because the detuning $\delta'$ is far enough from the mode frequency $\omega_k$ that negligible population is transferred to intermediate levels with vibration numbers $n \pm 1$.
2. Transition paths involving different, unpopulated vibrational states interfere destructively to eliminate the dependence of rates and revolution frequencies on phonon numbers. This is discussed below.

==== Perturbative analysis ====
If we consider two ions, each illuminated by lasers with detunings $\delta = \pm (\omega_k + \delta')$ from $\omega_{eg}$, the only energy-conserving transitions are $| gg \rangle \leftrightarrow |ee \rangle$ and $| ge \rangle \leftrightarrow |eg \rangle$. Under the Lamb-Dicke approximation $e^{-i \eta (a^\dagger+a)} \approx 1- i \eta (a^{\dagger}+ a)$, we determine the effective Rabi frequency for the $|gg, n \rangle \leftrightarrow |ee, n \rangle$ transition via intermediate states $m$ using second order perturbation theory:

$\tilde{\Omega} = 2 \sum_m \frac{\langle ee, n| H_{\rm int} |m \rangle \langle m | H_{\rm int} |gg, n \rangle}{E_{gg, n}+ \hbar \omega_i - E_m}$

There are four possible transition paths between $|gg, n \rangle$ and $|ee, n \rangle$:

$|gg, n \rangle \leftrightarrow |eg, n+1 \rangle$, $|eg, n+1 \rangle \leftrightarrow |ee, n \rangle$

$|gg, n \rangle \leftrightarrow |eg, n-1 \rangle$, $|eg, n-1 \rangle \leftrightarrow |ee, n \rangle$

$|gg, n \rangle \leftrightarrow |ge, n+1 \rangle$, $|ge, n+1 \rangle \leftrightarrow |ee, n \rangle$

$|gg, n \rangle \leftrightarrow |ge, n-1 \rangle$, $|ge, n-1 \rangle \leftrightarrow |ee, n \rangle$

and so the summation can be restricted to these four intermediate terms.

The pathways involving intermediate states with $n+1$ quanta yield $\sqrt{n+1} \Omega^2 \eta^2/(\delta - \omega_k)$, while the $n-1$ pathways yield $-n \Omega^2 \eta^2/(\delta- \omega_k)$. Summing terms, we obtain the effective Rabi frequency $\tilde{\Omega} = \frac{(\Omega \eta)^2}{\delta'}$, which is independent of phonon number $n$ due to destructive interference between pathways.

Four similar transition pathways can be identified between $|ge, n \rangle \leftrightarrow |eg, n \rangle$, resulting in the state evolution:

$|gg \rangle \rightarrow \cos(\frac{\tilde{\Omega} t}{2}) |gg \rangle + i \sin(\frac{\tilde \Omega t}{2})|ee \rangle$

$|ee \rangle \rightarrow \cos(\frac{\tilde{\Omega} t}{2}) |ee \rangle + i \sin(\frac{\tilde \Omega t}{2})|gg \rangle$

$|ge \rangle \rightarrow \cos(\frac{\tilde{\Omega} t}{2}) |ge \rangle - i \sin(\frac{\tilde \Omega t}{2})|eg \rangle$

$|eg \rangle \rightarrow \cos(\frac{\tilde{\Omega} t}{2}) |eg \rangle - i \sin(\frac{\tilde \Omega t}{2})|ge \rangle$ .

Maximally entangled states are created at time $t = \pi/(2 |\tilde{\Omega}|)$.

==== Interaction Hamiltonian ====
In the weak field regime, $M_1(t)$ can be neglected, as the phase space trajectory consists of very small, fast loops about the origin. To find $M_2(t)$, counter-rotating terms neglected in the rotating wave approximation must be re-introduced as a linear term appears that dominates at long times.

Doing so, the effective time evolution operator becomes

$U_{\rm slow}(t) \approx \exp[i\sum_{i<j, k} (\hat{\sigma}_i \hat{\sigma}_j)\frac{\eta_{i,k} \eta_{j,k} \Omega_i \Omega_j}{\mu^2-\omega_k^2} \omega_k t]$

which is equivalent to that of an Ising Hamiltonian

$H_{\rm eff} \approx \sum_{i<j} J_{ij} \hat{\sigma}_i \hat{\sigma}_j,$

with coupling between $i$ and $j$ given by

$J_{ij} \approx \Omega_i \Omega_j \sum_k \frac{\eta_{i, k} \eta_{j,k}}{\mu^2-\omega_k^2} \omega_k$.
