= List of quantum logic gates =

In gate-based quantum computing, various sets of quantum logic gates are commonly used to express quantum operations. The following tables list several unitary quantum logic gates, together with their common name, how they are represented, and some of their properties. Controlled or conjugate transpose (adjoint) versions of some of these gates may not be listed.

== Identity gate and global phase ==
Name	# qubits	Operator symbol	Matrix	Circuit diagram	Properties	Refs
Identity, no-op	1 (any)	$I,\;\mathbb{I}$, 𝟙	$$\begin{bmatrix} 1 & 0 \\ 0 & 1\end{bmatrix}$$	or	Hermitian; Identity element	
Global phase	1 (any)	$\mathrm{Ph}$, $\mathrm{Phase}$ or $\mathrm e^{i\delta}I$	$$\mathrm{e}^{i\delta}\begin{bmatrix} 1 & 0 \\ 0 & 1\end{bmatrix}$$		Continuous parameters: $\delta$ (period $2\pi$); Exponential form: $\exp(i\delta I)$	

The identity gate is the identity operation $I|\psi\rangle=|\psi\rangle$, most of the times this gate is not indicated in circuit diagrams, but it is useful when describing mathematical results. It has been described as being a "wait cycle", and a NOP.

The global phase gate introduces a global phase $e^{i\varphi}$ to the whole qubit quantum state. A quantum state is uniquely defined up to a phase. Because of the Born rule, a phase factor has no effect on a measurement outcome: $|e^{i\varphi}|=1$ for any $\varphi$. Because $e^{i\delta}|\psi\rangle \otimes |\phi\rangle = e^{i\delta}(|\psi\rangle \otimes |\phi\rangle),$ when the global phase gate is applied to a single qubit in a quantum register, the entire register's global phase is changed. Also, $\mathrm{Ph}(0)=I.$

These gates can be extended to any number of qubits or qudits.

== Clifford qubit gates ==
This table includes commonly used Clifford gates for qubits.

Names	# qubits	Operator symbol	Matrix	Circuit diagram	Some properties	Refs
Pauli X, NOT, bit flip	1	$X,\;\mathrm{NOT},\;\sigma_x$	$$\begin{bmatrix} 0 & 1 \\ 1 & 0\end{bmatrix}$$	or	Hermitian; Pauli group; Traceless; Involutory	
Pauli Y	1	$Y,\;\sigma_y$	$$\begin{bmatrix} 0 & -i \\ i & 0\end{bmatrix}$$		Hermitian; Pauli group; Traceless; Involutory	
Pauli Z, phase flip	1	$Z,\;\sigma_z$	$$\begin{bmatrix} 1 & 0 \\ 0 & -1\end{bmatrix}$$		Hermitian; Pauli group; Traceless; Involutory	
Phase gate S, square root of Z	1	$S,\;P,\;\sqrt{Z}$	$$\begin{bmatrix} 1 & 0 \\ 0 & i\end{bmatrix}$$			
Square root of X, square root of NOT	1	$\sqrt{X}$, $V$, $\sqrt{\mathrm{NOT}},\;\mathrm{SX}$	$$\frac{1}{2}\begin{bmatrix} 1+i & 1-i \\ 1-i & 1+i\end{bmatrix}$$			
Hadamard, Walsh-Hadamard	1	$H$	$$\frac{1}{\sqrt{2}}\begin{bmatrix} 1 & 1 \\ 1 & -1\end{bmatrix}$$		Hermitian; Traceless; Involutory	
Controlled NOT, controlled-X, controlled-bit flip, reversible exclusive OR, Feynman	2	$\mathrm{CNOT}$, $\mathrm{XOR},\;\mathrm{CX}$	$$\begin{bmatrix} 1 & 0 & 0 & 0 \\ 0 & 1 & 0 & 0 \\0 & 0 & 0 & 1 \\ 0 & 0 & 1 & 0\end{bmatrix}$$ $$\begin{bmatrix} 1 & 0 & 0 & 0 \\ 0 & 0 & 0 & 1 \\0 & 0 & 1 &0  \\ 0 & 1 & 0 & 0\end{bmatrix}$$		Hermitian; Involutory; Implementation: Cirac–Zoller gate	
Anticontrolled-NOT, anticontrolled-X, open-controlled-CNOT, zero control, control-on-0-NOT, reversible exclusive NOR	2	$\overline{\mathrm C}\mathrm X$, $\text{controlled[0]-NOT}$, $\mathrm{XNOR}$	$$\begin{bmatrix} 0 & 1 & 0 & 0 \\ 1 & 0 & 0 & 0 \\0 & 0 & 1 & 0 \\ 0 & 0 & 0 & 1\end{bmatrix}$$		Hermitian; Involutory	
Controlled-Z, controlled sign flip, controlled phase flip	2	$\mathrm{CZ}$, $\mathrm{CPF}$, $\mathrm{CSIGN}$, $\mathrm{CPHASE}$	$$\begin{bmatrix} 1 & 0 & 0 & 0 \\ 0 & 1 & 0 & 0 \\0 & 0 & 1 & 0 \\ 0 & 0 & 0 & -1\end{bmatrix}$$		Hermitian; Involutory; Symmetrical; Implementation: Duan-Kimble gate	
Double-controlled NOT	2	$\mathrm{DCNOT}$	$$\begin{bmatrix} 1 & 0 & 0 & 0 \\ 0 & 0 & 1 & 0 \\ 0 & 0 & 0 & 1 \\ 0 & 1 & 0 & 0\end{bmatrix}$$		Special unitary	
Swap	2	$\mathrm{SWAP}$	$$\begin{bmatrix} 1 & 0 & 0 & 0 \\ 0 & 0 & 1 & 0 \\0 & 1 & 0 & 0 \\ 0 & 0 & 0 & 1\end{bmatrix}$$	or	Hermitian; Involutory; Symmetrical	
Imaginary swap	2	$\mbox{iSWAP}$	$$\begin{bmatrix} 1&0&0&0\\0&0&i&0\\0&i&0&0\\0&0&0&1\end{bmatrix}$$	or	Special unitary; Symmetrical	

Other Clifford gates, including higher dimensional ones are not included here but by definition can be generated using $H,S$ and $\mathrm{CNOT}$.

Note that if a Clifford gate A is not in the Pauli group, $\sqrt{A}$ or controlled-A are not in the Clifford gates.

The Clifford set is not a universal quantum gate set.

== Non-Clifford qubit gates ==
=== Relative phase gates ===
Names	# qubits	Operator symbol	Matrix	Circuit diagram	Properties	Refs
Phase shift	1	$P(\varphi),\;R(\varphi),\;u_1(\varphi)$	$$\begin{bmatrix} 1 & 0 \\ 0 & \mathrm e^{i \varphi}\end{bmatrix}$$		Continuous parameters: $\varphi$ (period $2\pi$)	
Phase gate T, π/8 gate, fourth root of Z	1	$T,P(\pi/4)$ or $\sqrt[4]{Z}$	$$\begin{bmatrix} 1 & 0 \\ 0 & \mathrm e^{i\pi /4}\end{bmatrix}$$			
Controlled phase	2	$\mathrm{CPhase}(\varphi),\mathrm{CR}(\varphi)$	$$\begin{bmatrix} 1 & 0 & 0 & 0 \\ 0 & 1 & 0 & 0 \\ 0 & 0 & 1 & 0 \\ 0 & 0 & 0 & e^{i \varphi} \end{bmatrix}$$		Continuous parameters: $\varphi$ (period $2\pi$); Symmetrical; Implementation: Jaksch Gate	
Controlled phase S	2	$\mathrm{CS},\text{controlled-}S$	$$\begin{bmatrix} 1 & 0 & 0 & 0  \\ 0 & 1 & 0 & 0  \\ 0 & 0 & 1 & 0 \\ 0 & 0 & 0 & i \end{bmatrix}$$		Symmetrical	

The phase shift is a family of single-qubit gates that map the basis states $P(\varphi)|0\rangle = |0\rangle$ and $P(\varphi)|1\rangle= e^{i\varphi}|1\rangle$. The probability of measuring a $|0\rangle$ or $|1\rangle$ is unchanged after applying this gate, however it modifies the phase of the quantum state. This is equivalent to tracing a horizontal circle (a line of latitude), or a rotation along the z-axis on the Bloch sphere by $\varphi$ radians. A common example is the T gate where $\varphi = \frac{\pi}{4}$ (historically known as the $\pi /8$ gate), the phase gate. Note that some Clifford gates are special cases of the phase shift gate: $P(0)=I,\;P(\pi)=Z;P(\pi/2)=S.$

The argument to the phase shift gate is in U(1), and the gate performs a phase rotation in U(1) along the specified basis state (e.g. $P(\varphi)$ rotates the phase about $|1\rangle$). Extending $P(\varphi)$ to a rotation about a generic phase of both basis states of a 2-level quantum system (a qubit) can be done with a series circuit:
$$P(\beta) \cdot X \cdot P(\alpha) \cdot X = \begin{bmatrix} e^{i\alpha} & 0 \\ 0 & e^{i\beta} \end{bmatrix}$$
. When $\alpha = -\beta$ this gate is the rotation operator $R_z(2\beta)$ gate and if $\alpha =\beta$ it is a global phase. (Note: $\alpha = -\beta$ when $P(\alpha)=P(\beta)^\dagger$, where $\dagger$ is the conjugate transpose (or Hermitian adjoint).) (Note: Also: $\left(P(\delta) \cdot Y\right)^2 = e^{i\delta} I$)

The T gate's historic name of $\pi /8$ gate comes from the identity $R_z(\pi/4) \operatorname{Ph}\left(\frac{\pi}{8}\right) = P(\pi/4)$, where
$$R_z(\pi/4) = \begin{bmatrix} e^{-i\pi/8} & 0 \\ 0 & e^{i\pi/8} \end{bmatrix}$$.

Arbitrary single-qubit phase shift gates $P(\varphi)$ are natively available for transmon quantum processors through timing of microwave control pulses. It can be explained in terms of change of frame.

As with any single qubit gate one can build a controlled version of the phase shift gate. With respect to the computational basis, the 2-qubit controlled phase shift gate is: shifts the phase with $\varphi$ only if it acts on the state $|11\rangle$:

$$|a,b\rangle \mapsto \begin{cases}
e^{i\varphi}|a,b\rangle & \mbox{for }a=b=1 \\
|a,b\rangle & \mbox{otherwise.}
\end{cases}$$

The controlled-Z (or CZ) gate is the special case where $\varphi = \pi$.

The controlled-S gate is the case of the controlled-$P(\varphi)$ when $\varphi = \pi/2$ and is a commonly used gate.

=== Rotation operator gates ===
Names	# qubits	Operator symbol	Exponential form	Matrix	Circuit diagram	Properties	Refs
Rotation about x-axis	1	$R_x(\theta)$	$\exp(-iX\theta/2)$	$${\begin{bmatrix}\cos(\theta /2)&-i\sin(\theta /2)\\-i\sin(\theta /2)&\cos(\theta /2)\end{bmatrix}}$$		Special unitary; Continuous parameters: $\theta$ (period $4\pi$)	
Rotation about y-axis	1	$R_y(\theta)$	$\exp(-iY\theta/2)$	$$\begin{bmatrix} \cos(\theta/2) & -\sin(\theta/2) \\ \sin(\theta/2) & \cos(\theta/2) \end{bmatrix}$$		Special unitary; Continuous parameters: $\theta$ (period $4\pi$)	
Rotation about z-axis	1	$R_z(\theta)$	$\exp(-iZ\theta/2)$	$$\begin{bmatrix} \exp(-i\theta/2) & 0 \\0 & \exp(i\theta/2) \end{bmatrix}$$		Special unitary; Continuous parameters: $\theta$ (period $4\pi$)	

The rotation operator gates $R_x(\theta),R_y(\theta)$ and $R_z(\theta)$ are the analog rotation matrices in three Cartesian axes of SO(3), (Note: a SU(2) double cover. See also Hopf fibration.) along the x, y or z axes of the Bloch sphere projection.

As Pauli matrices are related to the generator of rotations, these rotation operators can be written as matrix exponentials with Pauli matrices in the argument. Any $2 \times 2$ unitary matrix in SU(2) can be written as a product (i.e. series circuit) of three rotation gates or less. Note that for two-level systems such as qubits and spinors, these rotations have a period of 4π. A rotation of 2π (360 degrees) returns the same statevector with a different phase.

We also have $R_{b}(-\theta)=R_{b}(\theta)^{\dagger}$ and $R_{b}(0)=I$ for all $b \in \{x, y, z\}.$

The rotation matrices are related to the Pauli matrices in the following way: $R_x(\pi)=-iX, R_y(\pi)=-iY, R_z(\pi)=-iZ.$

It is possible to work out the adjoint action of rotations on the Pauli vector, namely rotation effectively by double the angle a to apply Rodrigues' rotation formula:

$$\begin{align}
R_n(-a)\vec{\sigma}R_n(a)= {} & \exp\left( i \frac{a}{2}\left(\hat{n} \cdot \vec{\sigma}\right) \right) ~ \vec{\sigma}~ \exp \left(-i \frac{a}{2}\left(\hat{n} \cdot \vec{\sigma}\right) \right) \\[6pt]
= {} &  \vec{\sigma}  \cos (a) + \hat{n} \times \vec{\sigma} ~\sin (a)+ \hat{n} ~ \hat{n} \cdot \vec{\sigma} ~ (1 - \cos (a))~ .
\end{align}$$

Taking the dot product of any unit vector with the above formula generates the expression of any single qubit gate when sandwiched within adjoint rotation gates. For example, it can be shown that $R_y(-\pi/2)XR_y(\pi/2)=\hat{x}\cdot (\hat{y}\times \vec{\sigma})=Z$. Also, using the anticommuting relation we have $R_y(-\pi/2)XR_y(\pi/2)=XR_y(+\pi/2)R_y(\pi/2)=X(-iY)=Z$.

Rotation operators have interesting identities. For example, $R_y(\pi/2)Z = H$ and $X R_y(\pi/2) = H.$ Also, using the anticommuting relations we have $ZR_y(-\pi/2) = H$ and $R_y(-\pi/2)X = H.$

Global phase and phase shift can be transformed into each other's with the Z-rotation operator: $R_z(\gamma) \operatorname{Ph}\left(\frac{\gamma}{2}\right) = P(\gamma)$.

The $\sqrt{X}$ gate represents a rotation of π/2 about the x axis at the Bloch sphere $\sqrt{X}=e^{i\pi/4}R_x(\pi/2)$.

Similar rotation operator gates exist for SU(3) using Gell-Mann matrices. They are the rotation operators used with qutrits.

=== Two-qubit interaction gates ===
Names	# qubits	Operator symbol	Exponential form	Matrix	Circuit diagram	Properties	Refs
XX interaction	2	$R_{xx}(\phi)$, $\text{XX} (\phi)$	$\exp\left(-i \frac{\phi}{2} X\otimes X\right)$	$$\begin{bmatrix} \cos\left(\frac{\phi}{2}\right) & 0 & 0 & -i \sin\left(\frac{\phi}{2}\right) \\ 0 &\cos\left(\frac{\phi}{2}\right) & -i \sin\left(\frac{\phi}{2}\right) & 0 \\ 0 & -i \sin\left(\frac{\phi}{2}\right) & \cos\left(\frac{\phi}{2}\right) & 0 \\ -i \sin\left(\frac{\phi}{2}\right) & 0 & 0 & \cos\left(\frac{\phi}{2}\right) \\ \end{bmatrix}$$		Special unitary; Continuous parameters: $\theta$ (period $4\pi$); Implementation: Mølmer–Sørensen gate	
YY interaction	2	$R_{yy}(\phi)$, $\text{YY} (\phi)$	$\exp\left(-i \frac{\phi}{2} Y\otimes Y\right)$	$$\begin{bmatrix} \cos\left(\frac{\phi}{2}\right) & 0 & 0 & i\sin\left(\frac{\phi}{2}\right) \\ 0 & \cos\left(\frac{\phi}{2}\right) & -i\sin\left(\frac{\phi}{2}\right) & 0 \\ 0 & -i\sin\left(\frac{\phi}{2}\right) & \cos\left(\frac{\phi}{2}\right) & 0 \\ i\sin\left(\frac{\phi}{2}\right) & 0 & 0 & \cos\left(\frac{\phi}{2}\right) \\ \end{bmatrix}$$		Special unitary; Continuous parameters: $\theta$ (period $4\pi$); Implementation: Mølmer–Sørensen gate	
ZZ interaction	2	${\displaystyle R_{zz}(\phi )}$, $\text{ZZ} (\phi)$	${\displaystyle \exp \left(-i{\frac {\phi }{2}}Z\otimes Z\right)}$	$$\begin{bmatrix} e^{-i \phi/2} & 0 & 0 & 0 \\ 0 & e^{i \phi/2} & 0 & 0 \\ 0 & 0 & e^{i \phi/2} & 0 \\ 0 & 0 & 0 & e^{-i \phi/2} \\ \end{bmatrix}$$		Special unitary; Continuous parameters: $\theta$ (period $4\pi$)	
XY, XX plus YY	2	${\displaystyle R_{xy}(\phi )}$, $\text{XY} (\phi)$	${\displaystyle \exp \left[-i\frac {\phi }{4}(X\otimes X+Y\otimes Y)\right]}$	$$\begin{bmatrix} 1 & 0 & 0 & 0  \\ 0 & \cos(\phi/2) & - i\sin(\phi/2) & 0  \\ 0 & -i\sin(\phi/2)  & \cos(\phi/2) & 0 \\ 0 & 0 & 0 & 1  \\ \end{bmatrix}$$		Special unitary; Continuous parameters: $\theta$ (period $4\pi$)	

The qubit-qubit Ising coupling or Heisenberg interaction gates R_{xx}, R_{yy} and R_{zz} are 2-qubit gates that are implemented natively in some trapped-ion quantum computers, using for example the Mølmer–Sørensen gate procedure.

Note that these gates can be expressed in sinusoidal form also, for example $R_{xx}(\phi) = \exp\left(-i \frac{\phi}{2} X\otimes X\right)= \cos\left(\frac{\phi}{2}\right)I\otimes I-i \sin\left(\frac{\phi}{2}\right)X\otimes X$.

The CNOT gate can be further decomposed as products of rotation operator gates and exactly a single two-qubit interaction gate, for example

$$\mbox{CNOT} =e^{-i\frac{\pi}{4}}R_{y_1}(-\pi/2)R_{x_1}(-\pi/2)R_{x_2}(-\pi/2)R_{xx}(\pi/2)R_{y_1}(\pi/2).$$

The SWAP gate can be constructed from other gates, for example using the two-qubit interaction gates: $\text{SWAP} = e^{i\frac{\pi}{4}}R_{xx}(\pi/2)R_{yy}(\pi/2)R_{zz}(\pi/2)$.

In superconducting circuits, the family of gates resulting from Heisenberg interactions is sometimes called the fSim gate set. They can be realized using flux-tunable qubits with flux-tunable coupling, or using microwave drives in fixed-frequency qubits with fixed coupling.

=== Non-Clifford swap gates ===
Names	# qubits	Operator symbol	Matrix	Circuit diagram	Properties	Refs
Square root swap	2	$\sqrt{\mathrm{SWAP}}$	$$\begin{bmatrix} 1  &  0  &  0  &  0  \\ 0  &  \frac{1}{{2}} (1+i)  &  \frac{1}{{2}} (1-i)  &  0  \\ 0  &  \frac{1}{{2}} (1-i)  &  \frac{1}{{2}} (1+i)  &  0  \\ 0  &  0  &  0  &  1 \\ \end{bmatrix}$$			
Square root imaginary swap	2	$\sqrt{\mbox{iSWAP}}$	$$\begin{bmatrix} 1&0&0&0\\0&\frac{1}{\sqrt{2}}&\frac{i}{\sqrt{2}}&0\\0&\frac{i}{\sqrt{2}}&\frac{1}{\sqrt{2}}&0\\0&0&0&1\end{bmatrix}$$		Special unitary	
Swap (raised to a power)	2	$\mbox{SWAP}^\alpha$	$$\begin{bmatrix} 1&0&0&0\\0&\frac{1+e^{i \pi \alpha}}{2}&\frac{1-e^{i \pi \alpha}}{2}&0\\0&\frac{1-e^{i \pi \alpha}}{2}&\frac{1+e^{i \pi \alpha}}{2}&0\\0&0&0&1\end{bmatrix}$$		Continuous parameters: $\alpha$ (period $2$)	
Fredkin, controlled swap	3	$\mathrm{CSWAP}$, $\mathrm{FREDKIN}$	$$\begin{bmatrix} 1 & 0 & 0 & 0 & 0 & 0 & 0 & 0 \\ 0 & 1 & 0 & 0 & 0 & 0 & 0 & 0 \\ 0 & 0 & 1 & 0 & 0 & 0 & 0 & 0 \\ 0 & 0 & 0 & 1 & 0 & 0 & 0 & 0 \\ 0 & 0 & 0 & 0 & 1 & 0 & 0 & 0 \\ 0 & 0 & 0 & 0 & 0 & 0 & 1 & 0 \\ 0 & 0 & 0 & 0 & 0 & 1 & 0 & 0 \\ 0 & 0 & 0 & 0 & 0 & 0 & 0 & 1 \\ \end{bmatrix}$$	or	Hermitian; Involutory; Functionally complete reversible gate for Boolean algebra	

The √SWAP gate performs half-way of a two-qubit swap (see Clifford gates). It is universal such that any many-qubit gate can be constructed from only √SWAP and single qubit gates. More than one application of the √SWAP is required to produce a Bell state from product states. The √SWAP gate arises naturally in systems that exploit exchange interaction.

For systems with Ising like interactions, it is sometimes more natural to introduce the imaginary swap or iSWAP. Note that $i\mbox{SWAP}=R_{xx}(-\pi/2)R_{yy}(-\pi/2)$ and $\sqrt{i\mbox{SWAP}}=R_{xx}(-\pi/4)R_{yy}(-\pi/4)$, or more generally $\sqrt[n]{i\mbox{SWAP}}=R_{xx}(-\pi/2n)R_{yy}(-\pi/2n)$ for all real n except 0.

SWAP^{α} arises naturally in spintronic quantum computers.

The Fredkin gate (also CSWAP or CS gate), named after Edward Fredkin, is a 3-bit gate that performs a controlled swap. It is universal for classical computation. It has the useful property that the numbers of 0s and 1s are conserved throughout, which in the billiard ball model means the same number of balls are output as input.

=== Other named gates ===
Names	# qubits	Operator symbol	Matrix	Circuit diagram	Properties	Named after	Refs
General single qubit rotation	1	$U(\theta,\phi,\lambda)$	$${\begin{bmatrix}\cos(\theta /2)&-e^{i\lambda}\sin(\theta /2)\\e^{i\phi}\sin(\theta /2)&e^{i(\lambda+\phi)}\cos(\theta /2)\end{bmatrix}}$$		Implements an arbitrary single-qubit rotation; Continuous parameters: $\theta,\phi,\lambda$ (period $2\pi$)	OpenQASM U gate (Note: The matrix shown here is from openQASM 3.0, which differs from $U(\theta,\phi,\lambda)$ from a global phase (OpenQASM 2.0 U gate is in SU(2)).)	
Barenco	2	$\mathrm{BARENCO}(\alpha,\phi,\theta)$	$$\begin{bmatrix} 1 & 0 & 0 & 0  \\ 0 & 1 & 0 & 0  \\ 0 & 0 & e^{i \alpha}\cos\theta & -\mathrm {i} e^{\mathrm{i} (\alpha-\phi)}\sin\theta  \\ 0 & 0 & -\mathrm {i} e^{\mathrm{i} (\alpha+\phi)}\sin\theta &e^{i \alpha}\cos\theta \end{bmatrix}$$		Implements a controlled arbitrary qubit rotation; Universal quantum gate; Continuous parameters: $\alpha,\phi,\theta$ (period $2\pi$)	Adriano Barenco	
Berkeley B	2	$B$	$$\begin{bmatrix} \cos(\pi/8) & 0 & 0 & i \sin(\pi/8)  \\ 0 & \cos(3\pi/8) & i \sin(3\pi/8) & 0  \\ 0 & i \sin(3\pi/8)  & \cos(3\pi/8) & 0 \\ i \sin(\pi/8) & 0 & 0 & \cos(\pi/8)  \\ \end{bmatrix}$$		Special unitary; Exponential form: $$\exp\left[i \frac\pi 8 (2X\otimes X + Y\otimes Y) \right]$$	University of California Berkeley	
Controlled-V, controlled square root NOT	2	$\mathrm{CSX},\text{controlled-}\sqrt{X},$ $\text{controlled-}V$	$$\begin{bmatrix} 1 & 0 & 0 & 0  \\ 0 & 1 & 0 & 0  \\ 0 & 0 & e^{i \pi /4}/\sqrt 2 & e^{-i \pi /4}/\sqrt 2 \\ 0 & 0 & e^{-i \pi /4}/\sqrt 2 & e^{i \pi /4}/\sqrt 2 \end{bmatrix}$$				
Core entangling, canonical decomposition	2	$N(a,b,c)$, $\mathrm{can}(a,b,c)$	$$\begin{bmatrix} e^{ic}\cos(a-b) & 0 & 0 & i e^{ic}\sin(a-b)  \\ 0 & e^{-ic}\cos(a+b) & i e^{-ic}\sin(a+b) & 0  \\ 0 & i e^{-ic}\sin(a+b)  & e^{-ic}\cos(a+b) & 0 \\ i e^{ic}\sin(a-b) & 0 & 0 & e^{ic}\cos(a-b)  \\ \end{bmatrix}$$		Special unitary; Universal quantum gate; Exponential form; $$\exp\left[i (a X\otimes X + b Y\otimes Y + c Z\otimes Z) \right]$$: Continuous parameters: $a,b,c$ (period $2\pi$)		
Dagwood Bumstead	2	$\text{DB}$	$$\begin{bmatrix} 1 & 0 & 0 & 0  \\ 0 & \cos(3\pi/8) & - i\sin(3\pi/8) & 0  \\ 0 & -i\sin(3\pi/8)  & \cos(3\pi/8) & 0 \\ 0 & 0 & 0 & 1  \\ \end{bmatrix}$$		Special unitary; Exponential form: $$\exp\left[-i \frac{3\pi}{16} (X\otimes X + Y\otimes Y) \right]$$	Comicbook Dagwood Bumstead	
Echoed cross resonance	2	$\text{ECR}$	$$\frac1{\sqrt2}\begin{bmatrix} 0 & 0 & 1 & i  \\ 0 & 0 & i & 1  \\ 1 & -i  & 0 & 0 \\ -i & 1 & 0 & 0  \\ \end{bmatrix}$$		Special unitary		
Fermionic simulation	2	$U_\text{fSim}(\theta,\phi)$, $\text{fSim}(\theta,\phi)$	$$\begin{bmatrix} 1 & 0 & 0 & 0  \\ 0 & \cos(\theta) & - i\sin(\theta) & 0  \\ 0 & -i\sin(\theta)  & \cos(\theta) & 0 \\ 0 & 0 & 0 & e^{i\phi}  \\ \end{bmatrix}$$		Special unitary; Continuous parameters: $\theta,\phi$ (period $2\pi$)		
Givens	2	$G(\theta)$, $\text{Givens}(\theta)$	$$\begin{bmatrix} 1 & 0 & 0 & 0  \\ 0 & \cos(\theta) & - \sin(\theta) & 0  \\ 0 & \sin(\theta)  & \cos(\theta) & 0 \\ 0 & 0 & 0 & 1  \\ \end{bmatrix}$$		Special unitary; Exponential form: $$\exp\left[-i \frac \theta 2 (Y\otimes X - X\otimes Y) \right]$$: Continuous parameters: $\theta,\phi$ (period $2\pi$)	Givens rotations	
Magic	2	$\mathcal{M}$	$$\frac1{\sqrt{2}}\begin{bmatrix} 1 & i & 0 & 0  \\ 0 & 0 & i & 1   \\ 0 & 0 &i  & -1  \\ 1 & -i & 0 & 0  \\ \end{bmatrix}$$				
Sycamore	2	$\text{syc}$, $\text{fSim}(\pi/2,\pi/6)$	$$\begin{bmatrix} 1&0&0&0\\0&0&-i&0\\0&-i&0&0\\0&0&0&\mathrm e^{-i \pi/6}\end{bmatrix}$$			Google's Sycamore processor	
CZ-SWAP	2	$\text{CZS}(\theta,\phi,\gamma)$,	$$\begin{bmatrix} 1&0&0&0\\0&-e^{i\gamma}\sin^2(\theta/2)+\cos^2(\theta/2)&\frac{1}{2}(1+e^{i\gamma})e^{-i\phi}\sin(\theta)&0\\0&\frac{1}{2}(1+e^{i\gamma})e^{i\phi}\sin(\theta)&-e^{i\gamma}\cos^2(\theta/2)+\sin^2(\theta/2)&0\\0&0&0&\mathrm -e^{i\gamma}\end{bmatrix}$$		Continuous parameters: $\theta,\phi,\gamma$; Submatrix of a controlled-CZS (CCZS)		
Deutsch	3	$D_\theta$, $D(\theta)$	$$\begin{bmatrix} 1 & 0 & 0 & 0 & 0 & 0 & 0 & 0 \\ 0 & 1 & 0 & 0 & 0 & 0 & 0 & 0 \\ 0 & 0 & 1 & 0 & 0 & 0 & 0 & 0 \\ 0 & 0 & 0 & 1 & 0 & 0 & 0 & 0 \\ 0 & 0 & 0 & 0 & 1 & 0 & 0 & 0 \\ 0 & 0 & 0 & 0 & 0 & 1 & 0 & 0 \\ 0 & 0 & 0 & 0 & 0 & 0 & i \cos\theta & \sin \theta \\ 0 & 0 & 0 & 0 & 0 & 0 & \sin\theta & i \cos\theta \\ \end{bmatrix}$$		Continuous parameters: $\theta,\phi$ (period $2\pi$); Universal quantum gate	David Deutsch	
Margolus, simplified Toffoli	3	$M$, $\text{RCCX}$	$$\begin{bmatrix} 1 & 0 & 0 & 0 & 0 & 0 & 0 & 0 \\ 0 & 1 & 0 & 0 & 0 & 0 & 0 & 0 \\ 0 & 0 & 1 & 0 & 0 & 0 & 0 & 0 \\ 0 & 0 & 0 & 1 & 0 & 0 & 0 & 0 \\ 0 & 0 & 0 & 0 & 1 & 0 & 0 & 0 \\ 0 & 0 & 0 & 0 & 0 & -1 & 0 & 0 \\ 0 & 0 & 0 & 0 & 0 & 0 & 0 & 1 \\ 0 & 0 & 0 & 0 & 0 & 0 & 1 & 0 \\ \end{bmatrix}$$		Hermitian; Involutory; Special unitary; Functionally complete reversible gate for Boolean algebra	Norman Margolus	
Peres	3	$\mathrm{PG}$,$\mathrm{Peres}$	$$\begin{bmatrix} 1 & 0 & 0 & 0 & 0 & 0 & 0 & 0 \\ 0 & 1 & 0 & 0 & 0 & 0 & 0 & 0 \\ 0 & 0 & 1 & 0 & 0 & 0 & 0 & 0 \\ 0 & 0 & 0 & 1 & 0 & 0 & 0 & 0 \\ 0 & 0 & 0 & 0 & 0 & 0 & 0& 1 \\ 0 & 0 & 0 & 0 & 0 & 0 & 1 & 0 \\ 0 & 0 & 0 & 0 & 1 & 0 & 0 & 0 \\ 0 & 0 & 0 & 0 & 0 & 1 & 0 & 0 \\ \end{bmatrix}$$		Functionally complete reversible gate for Boolean algebra	Asher Peres	
Toffoli, controlled-controlled NOT	3	$\mathrm{CCNOT},\mathrm{CCX}, \mathrm{Toff}$	$$\begin{bmatrix} 1 & 0 & 0 & 0 & 0 & 0 & 0 & 0 \\ 0 & 1 & 0 & 0 & 0 & 0 & 0 & 0 \\ 0 & 0 & 1 & 0 & 0 & 0 & 0 & 0 \\ 0 & 0 & 0 & 1 & 0 & 0 & 0 & 0 \\ 0 & 0 & 0 & 0 & 1 & 0 & 0 & 0 \\ 0 & 0 & 0 & 0 & 0 & 1 & 0 & 0 \\ 0 & 0 & 0 & 0 & 0 & 0 & 0 & 1 \\ 0 & 0 & 0 & 0 & 0 & 0 & 1 & 0 \\ \end{bmatrix}$$		Hermitian; Involutory; Functionally complete reversible gate for Boolean algebra	Tommaso Toffoli	
Fermionic-Fredkin, Controlled-fermionic SWAP	3	$\mathrm{fFredkin}$, $\mathrm{CCZS}(\pi/2,0,0)$,$\mathrm{CfSWAP}$	$$\begin{bmatrix} 1 & 0 & 0 & 0 & 0 & 0 & 0 & 0 \\ 0 & 1 & 0 & 0 & 0 & 0 & 0 & 0 \\ 0 & 0 & 1 & 0 & 0 & 0 & 0 & 0 \\ 0 & 0 & 0 & 1 & 0 & 0 & 0 & 0 \\ 0 & 0 & 0 & 0 & 1 & 0 & 0 & 0 \\ 0 & 0 & 0 & 0 & 0 & 0 & 1 & 0 \\ 0 & 0 & 0 & 0 & 0 & 1 & 0 & 0 \\ 0 & 0 & 0 & 0 & 0 & 0 & 0 & -1 \\ \end{bmatrix}$$				
