= Howard Carmichael =

New Zealand theoretical physicist

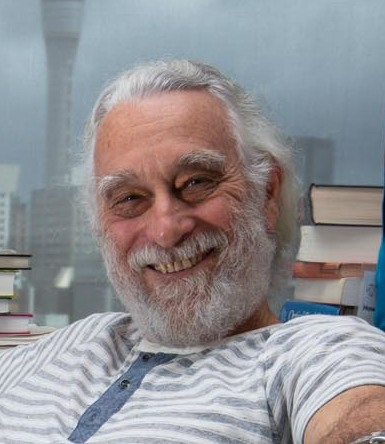
- Born: 17 January 1950 (age 76)
- Education: University of Auckland (BSc, MSc); University of Waikato (PhD)
- Scientific career
- Fields: Theoretical physics Quantum optics
- Workplaces: University of Auckland; University of Oregon; University of Arkansas

Howard John Carmichael (born 17 January 1950) is a British-born New Zealand theoretical physicist specialising in quantum optics and the theory of open quantum systems. He was the Dan Walls Professor of Physics at the University of Auckland and a principal investigator of the Dodd-Walls Centre. He is now Emeritus Professor. Carmichael has played a role in the development of the field of quantum optics and is particularly known for his Quantum Trajectory Theory (QTT) which offers a more detailed view of quantum behaviour by making predictions of single events happening to individual quantum systems. Carmichael works with experimental groups around the world to apply QTT to experiments on single quantum systems, including those contributing to the development of quantum computers. He is a Fellow of Optical Society of America, the American Physical Society and the Royal Society of New Zealand. He was awarded the Max Born Award in 2003, the Humboldt Research Award in 1997 and the Dan Walls Medal of the New Zealand Institute of Physics in 2017. In 2015, he was recognised as an Outstanding Referee by the American Physical Society.

== Biography and education ==
Carmichael was born in Manchester England on January 17, 1950 and emigrated to New Zealand. He gained a BSc in physics and mathematics in 1971, and an MSc in physics in 1973 at the University of Auckland. It was here that Carmichael met New Zealand physicist Dan Walls, who supervised Carmichael's MSc in Auckland, and later his PhD at the University of Waikato from 1972 to 1977. Having just returned from PhD and postdoctoral studies with Roy Glauber at Harvard University and Hermann Haken at the University of Stuttgart, Walls brought the rapidly growing field of Quantum Optics to New Zealand, established a major research centre with an active strategy of collaborating with quantum optics groups around the world. During Carmichael's PhD studies, he and Walls made seminal contributions to the theoretical foundations of quantum optics. He then travelled to the United States for further postgraduate studies.

After post-doctoral positions at the City University of New York, and at the University of Texas at Austin (1979–1981) Carmichael was appointed as an assistant professor and later associate professor at the University of Arkansas. He was a visiting scientist at the Royal Signal and Radar Establishment in Malvern in 1984, visiting professor at the University of Texas at Austin in 1988 and at Caltech in 1989. In 1989 he was made associate professor, and in 1991 full professor, at the University of Oregon. He returned to New Zealand in 2002 to join the University of Auckland, becoming the inaugural Dan Walls Professor of Physics.

== Research ==
Carmichael has made seminal contributions to the field of quantum optics and open quantum systems over more than four decades. He is known particularly for his development of quantum trajectory theory (1993), which offers a way to describe the evolution of a quantum system as it interacts with its environment. In 1993 he developed (at the same time as a separate formulation by Crispin Gardiner) the theory and application of cascaded quantum systems, in which the optical output of one quantum system becomes the optical input for another quantum system. He has also contributed to advances in the theory of nonclassical light and quantum correlation, quantum optical measurements, quantum fluctuations and noise in radiative processes, nonlinear physics and multi-photon processes, cavity quantum electrodynamics, quantum statistical methods and quantum entanglement.

=== Antibunched light ===
In 1976, while Carmichael was still a graduate student, he and his doctoral supervisor Dan Walls published a seminal paper that predicted photon antibunching, which led to the experimental demonstration of the quantum nature of light. The paper was based on their work with master equation techniques to describe open quantum systems, which Carmichael began during his masters. They had decided to investigate resonance fluorescence because it seemed like a good application of their master equations to two coupled open quantum systems. There was considerable international interest among the fledgling quantum optics community, in both experimental and theoretical resonance fluorescence. Using their newly developed master equation techniques, Walls and Carmichael derived the form of the fluorescence spectrum that agreed with previous experimental results. They went on to calculate the second-order correlation function to explore the statistics of resonance fluorescence. They were able to use the correlation function to explain how jumps of an emitting atom imprint on the emitted photon stream. They predicted that the correlation function should drop to zero at zero time delay and suggested a Quantum Electrodynamics (QED) experiment to test their predictions. These experiments were performed shortly afterwards providing evidence of the quantum character of the light emitted in resonance fluorescence.

=== Quantum trajectory theory (QTT) ===
Carmichael developed quantum trajectory theory (QTT) in the early 1990s, around the same time as the separate formulations by Dalibard Castin & Mølmer, and by Zoller, Ritsch & Dum). QTT (also known as quantum jump method or Monte Carlo wave function (MCWF)) is a formulation of quantum mechanics that tracks the path that a quantum object takes through the space of all its possible states as it is measured.

QTT is compatible with the standard formulation of quantum theory, as described by the Schrödinger equation, but offers a more detailed view. The Schrödinger equation, is a probabilistic theory. It gives the probability of finding a quantum system in each of its possible states should a measurement be made. This is useful for predicting average measurements of large ensembles of quantum objects but it does not describe the behaviour of individual particles. QTT fills this gap by offering a way to describe the trajectories of individual quantum particles that obey the probabilities given by the Schrödinger equation. QTT also works with open quantum systems that interact with their environment unlike the Schrödinger equation which only describes a quantum system in isolation. QTT has become particularly popular since the technology has become available to efficiently control and monitor individual quantum systems as it can predict how individual quantum objects such as particles will behave when they are observed.

In QTT open quantum systems are modelled as scattering processes, with classical external fields corresponding to the inputs and classical stochastic processes corresponding to the outputs (the fields after the measurement process). The mapping from inputs to outputs is provided by a quantum stochastic process that is set up to account for a particular measurement strategy (eg., photon counting, homodyne/heterodyne detection, etc).

QTT addresses the measurement problem in quantum mechanics by providing a detailed description of what happens during the so-called "collapse of the wave function". It reconciles the concept of a quantum jump with the smooth evolution described by the Schrödinger equation. The theory suggests that "quantum jumps" are not instantaneous but happen in a coherently driven system as a smooth transition through a series of superposition states. This prediction was tested experimentally in 2019 by a team at Yale University led by Michel Devoret and Zlatko Minev in collaboration with Carmichael and others at Yale University and the University of Auckland. In their experiment they used a superconducting artificial atom to observe a quantum jump in detail, confirming that the transition is a continuous process that unfolds over time. They were also able to detect when a quantum jump was about to occur and intervene to reverse it, sending the system back to the state in which it started. This experiment, inspired and guided by QTT, represents a new level of control over quantum systems and has potential applications in correcting errors in quantum computing in the future.

== Books ==
- Howard Carmichael (1999, 2002) An Open Systems Approach to Quantum Optics 1; Springer, Berlin Heidelberg (ISBN 3-540-56634-1 )
- H J Carmichael (1999, 2002) Statistical Methods in Quantum Optics 1: Master Equations and Fokker‐Planck Equations; Springer, Berlin Heidelberg (ISBN 978-3-642-08133-0 )
- H J Carmichael (2008) Statistical Methods in Quantum Optics 2: Non-Classical Fields; Springer, Berlin Heidelberg (ISBN 978-3-540-71319-7 )
- H J Carmichael, R J Glauber and M O Scully (Eds) (2001) Directions in Quantum Optics; Springer, Berlin Heidelberg (ISBN 3-540-41187-9)

== Honours and awards ==
- Dan Walls Medal of the New Zealand Institute of Physics (2017)
- Fellow of the Royal Society of New Zealand (2006)
- The Max Born Award of the Optical Society of America (2003)
- Humboldt Research award for Senior United States Scientists, Alexander Humboldt Foundation (1997)
- Fellow of the American Physical Society (1995)
- Fellow of the Optical Society of America (1990)
