= Crispin Gardiner =

New Zealand physicist (born 1942)

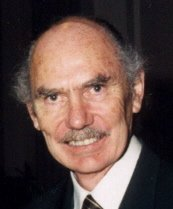
- Crispin Gardiner (2000)
- Born: Crispin William Gardiner; 18 October 1942 (age 83); Hastings, New Zealand
- Relatives: Pauline Gardiner (sister)

Crispin Gardiner
- Education: University of Auckland (BSc and MSc); Linacre College, Oxford University (D Phil)
- Known for: Stochastic methods Quantum noise Quantum optics Ultracold Atoms
- Scientific career
- Workplaces: Syracuse University; University of Waikato; Victoria University of Wellington; University of Otago
- Thesis: Topics in Elementary Particle Physics (1968)
- Doctoral advisor: Richard Dalitz
- Doctoral students: Peter Drummond
- Website: www.otago.ac.nz/physics/staff/

Crispin William Gardiner (born 18 October 1942) is a New Zealand physicist, who has worked in the fields of quantum optics, ultracold atoms and stochastic processes, and is an Honorary Professor in the Department of Physics at the University of Otago. He has written about 120 journal articles and several books in the fields of quantum optics, stochastic processes and ultracold atoms.

== Education ==
Born in Hastings New Zealand, Crispin Gardiner completed his undergraduate studies at the University of Auckland (B. Sc. 1964, M. Sc. 1965). He was awarded a research scholarship by the Royal Commission for the Exhibition of 1851 in 1965, under which received his DPhil in 1968 from the Oxford University for research in elementary particle physics.

== Career ==
Following his DPhil, Gardiner completed postdoctoral research in the group of George Sudarshan at the Syracuse University.

=== University of Waikato, 1970–1995 ===
Gardiner was appointed to the faculty of the Physics Department of the University of Waikato in 1970, and was awarded a personal chair in physics in 1992, a position held until 1995. When Gardiner arrived, the University of Waikato was only 5 years old, while the School of Science, which covered Physics, Mathematics, Chemistry, Biology and Earth Science, had only commenced teaching at the beginning of 1970, and no research facilities had been established.

Dan Walls took up a position at Waikato in 1972, and, working together, he and Gardiner established a major research centre for theoretical quantum optics at Waikato, building active and productive collaborations with groups throughout the world.

During this period

- He and Peter Drummond developed the positive P-representation
- He and Matthew Collett developed the input-output formalism for damped quantum systems, which they used to predict and describe the spectrum of squeezed light.
- He wrote the first (1985) edition of the book Stochastic Methods, now seen as a standard text in the field of applied stochastic processes.
- In 1986 he predicted the inhibition of atomic phase decays for a two-level atom coupled to a squeezed optical reservoir. While challenging to realise in optical systems, the phenomenon was eventually observed in a superconducting qubit system affording sufficient reservoir control.
- He wrote the first (1991) edition of the book Quantum Noise, (later editions were written in collaboration with Peter Zoller) which has become a standard text in the fields of quantum optics and quantum stochastic methods.
- In 1993 he developed (at the same time as a separate formulation by Howard Carmichael) the theory and application of cascaded quantum systems, in which the optical output of one quantum system becomes the optical input for another quantum system.

=== Work in early childhood education, 1971–1991 ===
A very significant part of Gardiner's activity over the years 1971-1991 was as a parent activist, administrator and government consultant in New Zealand early childhood education. During this period very significant expansion of recognition, provision and government funding for early childhood education occurred.

In particular

- He was one of the group which founded the "Campus Creche Society" in 1971, of which he was the secretary until 1974. The Campus Creche Society, advocated, and established the first Childcare Centre in the University of Waikato.
- He was elected to the executive of the N.Z. Childcare Association in 1975, becoming Vice President 1983–1984.
- In 1976 he organised the Hamilton Day Care Centres Trust, which operated childcare services in Hamilton, and administered the government Childcare Subsidy in the full Waikato region. He was chairman of The Trust 1976–1984.
- He worked for the Government in the development of policies and funding mechanisms for Early Childhood Education, as a member of several official boards and working parties, or as a consultant to the Ministry of Education.

=== Independent researcher at Victoria University of Wellington, 1995–2005 ===
In 1995 he left the University of Waikato and for the next nine years worked as an independently funded researcher affiliated to Victoria University of Wellington. This was funded by the New Zealand R&D system, which was willing to fund individuals outside established institutions, and was motivated by the opportunity to leave the increasingly bureaucratic New Zealand University system. During this period his work concentrated on the physics of Ultracold atoms, developing a collaboration with Rob Ballagh of the University of Otago. They produced number of influential scientific publications, mainly concentrating on kinetic processes in Bose–Einstein condensates, funded by successive research contracts with the Marsden Fund and in particular seven papers on quantum kinetic theory .

Gardiner characterised this period as "In terms of productivity, it has been the best 10 years research of my life."

=== University of Otago, 2005–2013 ===
In 2005 he was appointed as a Research Professor in the Department of Physics at the University of Otago. In this period he was active in developing the University of Otago as a major research centre in ultracold atoms, photonics and quantum optics, which was named the Jack Dodd Centre, after former Otago professor Jack Dodd. During this period there was a major reorganisation of government research funding, commencing in 2006, which he and Rob Ballagh strongly criticised, on the grounds that this would exclude university research from any major funding. Ultimately this aspect of the funding reform was not implemented, and in 2007 the Jack Dodd Centre was awarded a $6.4 million research contract by the Foundation for Research, Science and Technology.

From that time on, as director of the Jack Dodd Centre, his role developed more into that of a research leader until his retirement in early 2013.

=== Retirement ===
On retirement he became an honorary professor at the University of Otago and in 2016 he accepted a position as visiting fellow at the Institute for Quantum Optics and Quantum Information (IQOQI) in Innsbruck.

During this period he and Peter Zoller wrote the three books of The Quantum World of Ultra-Cold Atoms and Light.

== Books ==
- C W Gardiner: A Handbook of Stochastic Methods; Springer, Berlin Heidelberg, 1st ed. 1983; 2nd ed. 1985, 1989, 1998, 2001; 3rd Ed 2004, Russian Edition 1986 (Mir, Moscow)
- Crispin Gardiner: Stochastic Methods; Springer, Berlin Heidelberg, 2009 (A rewritten and updated 4th edition of A Handbook of Stochastic Methods)
- Crispin Gardiner: Elements of Stochastic Methods; AIP Publishing (online), Melville, New York, 2021, available at: https://doi.org/10.1063/9780735423718
- C W Gardiner: Quantum Noise; Springer, Berlin Heidelberg, 1st ed. 1991
- C W Gardiner and Peter Zoller: Quantum Noise; Springer, Berlin Heidelberg, 2nd ed. 1999, 3rd ed. 2004
- Crispin Gardiner and Peter Zoller: The Quantum World of Ultra-Cold Atoms and Light Book I: Foundations of Quantum Optics, Imperial College Press, London and Singapore 2014.
- Crispin Gardiner and Peter Zoller: The Quantum World of Ultra-Cold Atoms and Light Book II: Physics of Quantum Optical Devices, Imperial College Press, London and Singapore 2015.
- Crispin Gardiner and Peter Zoller: The Quantum World of Ultra-Cold Atoms and Light Book III: Ultra-Cold Atoms, World Scientific, London and Singapore 2014.

== Awards and honours ==
- 1983 Fellow of the New Zealand Institute of Physics
- 1984 Fellow of the American Physical Society
- 1990 Fellow of the Royal Society of New Zealand (Until 2011)
- 2000 Honorary Dr. Rer. Nat. from the University of Innsbruck: In recognition of his outstanding scientific merit in the field of theoretical quantum optics
