= Cirac–Zoller controlled-NOT gate =

Quantum logic gate

The Cirac–Zoller controlled-NOT gate is an implementation of the controlled-NOT (CNOT) quantum logic gate using cold trapped ions that was proposed by Ignacio Cirac and Peter Zoller in 1995 and represents the central ingredient of the Cirac–Zoller proposal for a trapped-ion quantum computer. The key idea of the Cirac–Zoller proposal is to mediate the interaction between the two qubits through the joint motion of the complete chain of trapped ions.

The quantum CNOT gate acts on two qubits and can entangle them. It forms part of the standard universal set of gates, meaning that any gate (unitary transformation) on the $N$-qubit Hilbert space can be approximated to arbitrary precision by a sequence of gates from the universal set.

The Cirac–Zoller gate was experimentally first realized in 2003 (in slightly modified form) at the University of Innsbruck, Austria by Ferdinand Schmidt-Kaler and coworkers in the group of Rainer Blatt using two calcium ions.

== Procedure ==
The qubits on which the Cirac–Zoller gate operates are represented by two internal states, ground state and excited state (called in the following g and e) of trapped ions. An additional auxiliary excited state a is used to implement the gate. Due to their mutual Coulomb repulsion the ions line up in a linear chain. The ions are cooled to their collective ground state, so that the quantization of the motion of the chain becomes relevant. The proposal assumes that each ion can be individually addressed by laser pulses. Both the transitions "$g\to e$" and "$g\to a$" can be driven by choosing different laser polarizations. For each transition, one can distinguish two kinds of such pulses. Those on resonance with the transition and those that are detuned from the respective transition by an energy difference that corresponds to the energy of a single quantum of motion of the ion chain. The former are called direct pulses, the latter sideband pulses. The proposal uses red sideband pulses (that have less energy than corresponds to the direct transition).

The Cirac–Zoller gate between two qubits represented by ions A and B is then realized in a three-step process:

1. A red sideband pulse is directed onto ion A. Length and strength of the pulse are chosen such that it realizes the following transformation: if initially ion A is in state e and the ion chain in the ground state, then at the end of the pulse the ion is in state g and the chain in its first excited state 1. Conversely, g is mapped to e if initially the chain was in its first excited state:
  $|g_A,1\rangle \mapsto -i |e_A,0\rangle$ and $|e_A,0\rangle \mapsto -i|g_A,1\rangle$, all other states are unaffected.
  This transformation is referred to as a $\pi$-pulse.
2. A $2\pi$-pulse is applied to the ion B on red sideband of the "$g\to a$"-transition: this changes the phase of the ion B if it is in the state g and the chain is in the first excited state: $|g_B,1\rangle \mapsto - |g_B,1\rangle$, all other states are unaffected. Given initial cooling and the design of the first step this means that the phase of ion B is flipped only if ion A originally was in the state e.
3. Another red sideband $\pi$-pulse on ion A completes the two-qubit gate. This returns ion A and the motion of the chain to its initial state.

Diagram of the three-pulse sequence used to implement the gate between qubits A and B. The pulses are as follows: (1): A π-pulse is applied to ion A. (2): A 2π-pulse is applied to ion B. (3): Another π-pulse is applied to ion A.

In total, the three pulses realize the following transformation on the two-qubit subspace in the motional ground state:

$$\begin{matrix}
&\xrightarrow{(1)}&&\xrightarrow{(2)}&&\xrightarrow{(3)}\\
|gg0\rangle && |gg0\rangle && |gg0\rangle && |gg0\rangle\\
|ge0\rangle && |ge0\rangle && |ge0\rangle && |ge0\rangle\\
|eg0\rangle && -i |gg1\rangle && i |gg1\rangle && |eg0\rangle\\
|ee0\rangle && -i |ge1\rangle && -i |ge1\rangle && - |ee0\rangle
\end{matrix},$$

that is, the state ee acquires a phase $-1$ the other three states are unaffected. This transformation is called a controlled-phase or controlled-Z gate ($U_{CZ}$), since the first qubit controls whether a phase flip (which corresponds to applying the Pauli $\sigma_z$ matrix) is applied to the second qubit. It can be turned into the CNOT gate by applying a single-qubit gate, the Hadamard gate to the ion B before and after the application of $U_{CZ}$:

$$U_{\mathrm{CNOT}} = (1\otimes H) U_{CZ} (1\otimes H).$$

The central theoretical realization, on which the above steps and much of the subsequent theoretical progress in trapped-ion quantum computation is based, is that the ion chain driven by red sideband pulses realizes the Jaynes–Cummings model for the two-level system formed by g and e and one of the normal modes of the chain. To achieve this, it is necessary that the light interacting with the ions can change their motional state. To suppress transitions in which more than one quantum of motion is transferred, one has to work in the Lamb Dicke regime where the wavelength of the light used is large compared to the size of the wave packet of the trapped ion. In this regime, the coupling strength is reduced and leads to a relatively slow gate.

== See also ==
- Mølmer–Sørensen gate
