= Peter Drummond (physicist) =

New Zealand physicist

Peter David Drummond FAA is a physicist and distinguished professor in the Centre for Quantum and Optical Science at Swinburne University of Technology.

Drummond was born in New Zealand in 1950, and was educated at Auckland University, where he graduated a B. Sc. (Hons), at Harvard where he received an A. M. (masters) degree, and at the University of Waikato in New Zealand, where his D.Phil. degree was supervised by Dan Walls and Crispin Gardiner. He worked as a postdoctoral researcher with Joseph H. Eberly at The University of Rochester, and then as an academic at Auckland University before being appointed to a chair of physics at Queensland University in 1989. He moved to Swinburne University of Technology in 2008.

== Areas of research ==
- Drummond and Crispin Gardiner developed the positive-P phase-space representation.
- His current research is at the intersection of atomic, molecular and optical physics, quantum information, quantum technology, condensed matter physics, and computational physics. The field is driven by an unprecedented level of experimental control of isolated quantum systems. Techniques used include novel computational methods that map quantum dynamics into stochastic equations on a generalized phase-space. These methods have applications to a wide range of complex physical, chemical and biological systems, including: photonics, condensed matter, Bose-Einstein condensates, strongly-correlated fermions, astrophysics, nano-chemical reactions, opto-mechanics and biophysics. Drummond's contributions to physics range from fundamental theorems in operator representation theory to the practical implementation of algorithms, and comparisons to experiment.

== Awards and honours ==
- In 2002 he was awarded the Forschungspreis, the Senior Research Award of the German Humboldt Society.
- In 2004 he was awarded the Harrie Massey Medal and Prize for his contributions to physics.
- In 2007 he was awarded the Moyal medal of Macquarie University.
- In 2008 he received the Boas medal of the Australian Institute of Physics.
- He was awarded the status of Fellow in the American Physical Society, after being nominated by their Forum on International Physics in 2000, for pioneering theoretical studies of quantum noise in nonlinear optical processes, including superfluorescence, optical bistability, parametric amplification and oscillation, fiber-optical solitons, proposed tests of quantum correlations, and the positive-P representation.
- He was also awarded the status of Fellow in the Australian Academy of Science in 2003, for tests of quantum theory, theory of solitons, computational physics, physics of communication and information, laser physics, and Bose-Einstein condensation.
