= Klaus Mølmer =

Danish physicist

- Born: 1963 (age 62–63); Vejle, Denmark
- Education: Aarhus University
- Occupation: Physicist
- Known for: Mølmer–Sørensen gate
- Awards: EliteForsk Award (2007); Humboldt Research Award (2023); Dirac Medal (2023)

Klaus Mølmer is a Danish physicist who is currently a professor at the Niels Bohr Institute of the University of Copenhagen. From 2000 to 2022, he was a professor of physics at the University of Aarhus.

In 1999, Mølmer and Anders Sørensen proposed the Mølmer–Sørensen gate for trapped ion quantum computing, which was one of the first proposals for the implementation of a multi-qubit gate on a physical system.

Mølmer was awarded the status of Fellow in the American Physical Society, after he was nominated by their Division of Atomic, Molecular & Optical Physics in 2008, for his outstanding and insightful contributions to theoretical quantum optics, quantum information science and quantum atom optics, including the development of novel computational methods to treat open systems in quantum mechanics and theoretical proposals for the quantum logic gates with trapped ions.

== Early life and education ==
Mølmer was born 1963 in Vejle, Denmark. He received his Cand.scient. degree (the Danish equivalent of a Master’s) in physics from Aarhus University in 1987, and subsequently remained at the same institution, where he earned his Ph.D. in physics in 1990.

== Career and research ==
After completing his Ph.D. in physics at Aarhus University in 1990, Klaus Mølmer held a postdoctoral fellowship at the Max Planck Institute for Quantum Optics in Garching, Germany, supported by the Alexander von Humboldt Foundation. He returned to Aarhus University in 1991 as an associate professor and was promoted to full professor in 2000. In 2022, he joined the Niels Bohr Institute at the University of Copenhagen as a professor of physics. Over the course of his career, Mølmer also held visiting professorships at institutions including Université Paris-Sud in France and the University of Innsbruck in Austria.

Mølmer’s research spans theoretical quantum optics, atomic physics, and quantum information science. He has made contributions to the understanding of open quantum systems, measurement theory, and conditional dynamics, including the development of the Monte Carlo wavefunction method, a widely used technique for simulating quantum systems subject to dissipation and continuous measurement. Together with Anders Sørensen, he proposed the Mølmer–Sørensen gate, a two-qubit entangling operation for trapped-ion quantum computers that is robust against motional heating. This gate removed a major experimental obstacle and quickly became a standard tool in ion-trap quantum computing, adopted in laboratories worldwide and implemented in commercial quantum computing platforms.

Mølmer has often been recognized as one of the leading voices in Danish and international quantum physics. His theoretical methods and proposals have become textbook material in the fields of quantum optics and quantum information, and his work has influenced both foundational research and applied quantum technologies.

Over the course of his career he received numerous awards, some of which include the EliteForsk Award (2007), the Alexander von Humboldt Research Award (2023), the Dirac Medal (2023), and the Carlsberg Foundation Research Prize (2025). He is also a Fellow of the American Physical Society (2008).

== Awards ==
Mølmer has been awarded several prizes, some of which are listed below.

- Carlsberg Foundation Research Prize, 2025.
- Alexander von Humboldt Research Award, 2023.
- Dirac Medal, University of New South Wales, 2023.
- Villum Kann Rasmussens Årslegat 2012.
- Fellow of the American Physical Society (APS), 2008.
- The EliteForsk Award of the Ministry of Science, Technology and Innovation of Denmark, 2007.
- Rigmor og Carl Holst-Knudens Videnskabspris (University of Aarhus biennial Research Award) 2004.
- Biennial Award of the Danish Physical Society, NKT's forsker pris. 1999.
- Annual Award of the Danish Optical Society, DOPS-prisen. 1998.
- Rømer Fondets Legat. 1995.
- PhD Award from the Danish Academy for Natural Sciences. 1993.

== See also ==
- List of fellows of the American Physical Society (1998–2010)
- Entanglement depth
- Quantum jump method
- Mølmer–Sørensen gate
