= Dalibard =

Dalibard is a French surname. Notable people with the surname include:

- Anne-Laure Dalibard, French mathematician
- Antoine Dalibard (born 1983), French cyclist
- Benoît Dalibard (born 1991), French footballer
- Jean Dalibard (born 1958), French physicist
- Thomas-François Dalibard (1709–1778), French physicist
