= Quantum jump method =

Computational simulation method for open quantum systems

The quantum jump method, also known as the Monte Carlo wave function (MCWF) is a technique in computational physics used for simulating open quantum systems and quantum dissipation. The quantum jump method was developed by Dalibard, Castin and Mølmer at a similar time to the similar method known as Quantum Trajectory Theory developed by Carmichael. Other contemporaneous works on wave-function-based Monte Carlo approaches to open quantum systems include those of Dum, Zoller and Ritsch and Hegerfeldt and Wilser.

== Method ==
An example of the quantum jump method being used to approximate the density matrix of a two-level atom undergoing damped Rabi oscillations. The random jumps can clearly be seen in the top subplot, and the bottom subplot compares the fully simulated density matrix to the approximation obtained using the quantum jump method.

Animation of the Monte Carlo prediction (blue) for the population of a coherently-driven, damped two-level system as more trajectories are added to the ensemble average, compared to the master equation prediction (red).

The quantum jump method is an approach which is much like the master-equation treatment except that it operates on the wave function rather than using a density matrix approach. The main component of this method is evolving the system's wave function in time with a pseudo-Hamiltonian; where at each time step, a quantum jump (discontinuous change) may take place with some probability. The calculated system state as a function of time is known as a quantum trajectory, and the desired density matrix as a function of time may be calculated by averaging over many simulated trajectories. For a Hilbert space of dimension N, the number of wave function components is equal to N while the number of density matrix components is equal to N^{2}. Consequently, for certain problems the quantum jump method offers a performance advantage over direct master-equation approaches.
