= Jean Dalibard =

French physicist (born 1958)

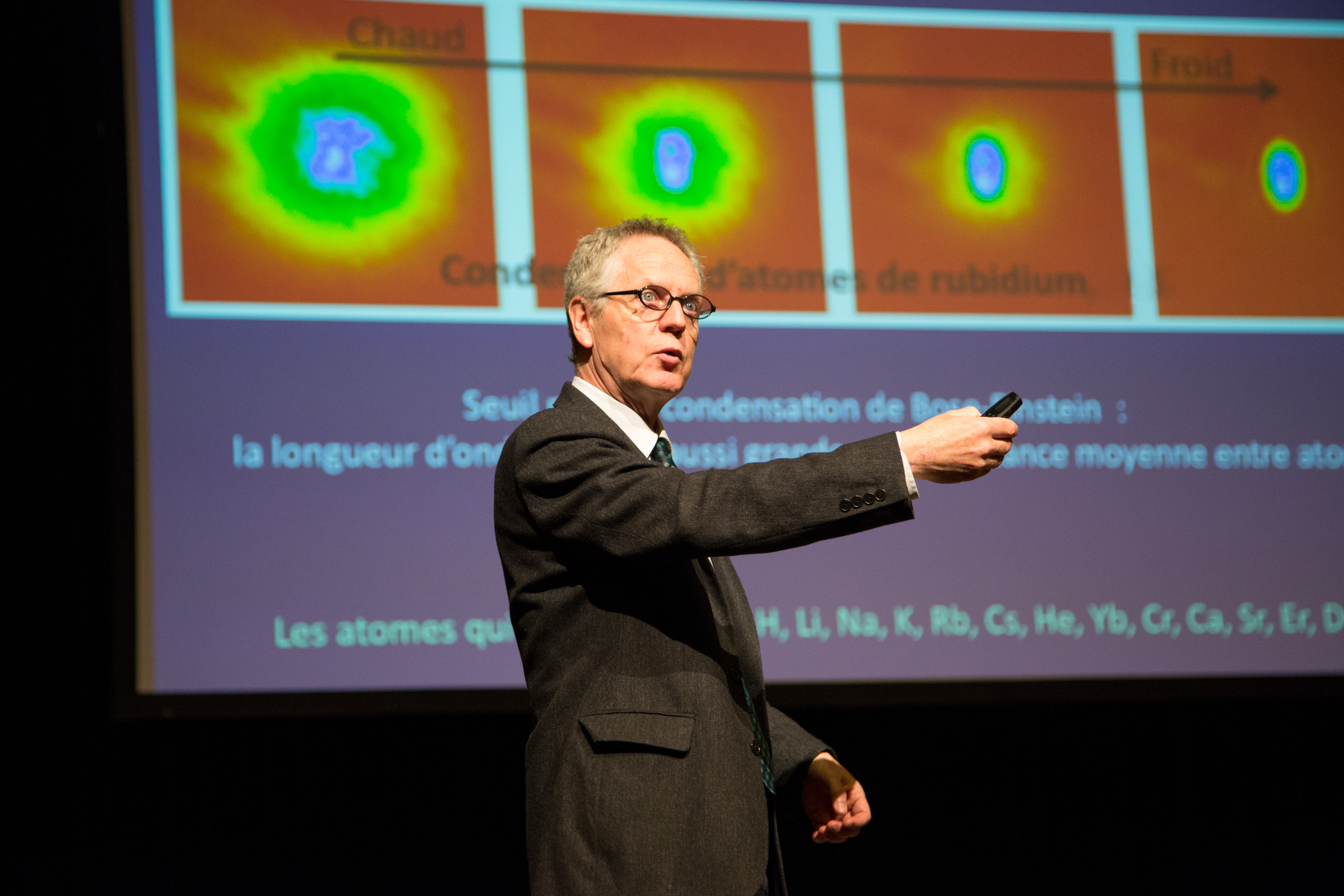
- Born: 8 December 1958 (age 67)
- Education: École Normale Supérieure; Paris 6
- Occupation: Physicist
- Known for: Magneto-optical trap
- Awards: CNRS Gold Medal (2021); Max Born Award (2012); Davisson–Germer Prize (2012); Three Physicists Prize (2010); Prix Jean Ricard (2000)

Jean Dalibard (born 8 December 1958) is a French physicist, Professor at the École Polytechnique, member of the French Academy of Sciences and a researcher at the École Normale Supérieure.

In 2009, Dalibard received the Blaise Pascal medal of the European Academy of Sciences for "his outstanding and influential works in atomic physics and quantum optics". In 2012, he received the Max Born Award and Davisson–Germer Prize. He was elected an international member of the American Philosophical Society in 2018. In 2020, he was honoured to be an international member of the National Academy of Sciences. In 2021, he was awarded the CNRS Gold Medal.

== See also ==
- Quantum jump method
