= Peter Zoller =

Austrian theoretical physicist

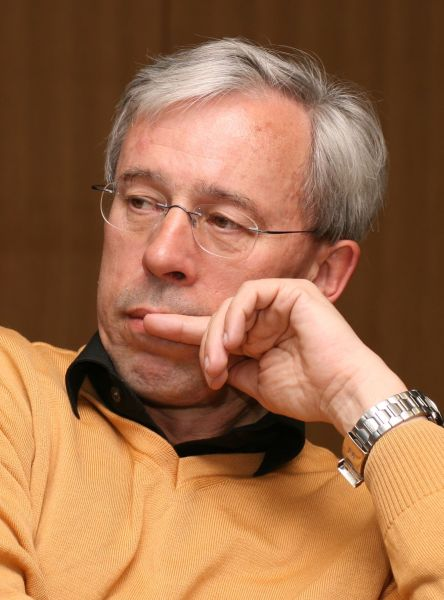
- Born: 16 September 1952 (age 74); Innsbruck, Austria
- Education: University of Innsbruck
- Known for: Cirac–Zoller controlled-NOT gate Trapped ion quantum computer Quantum simulation Quantum repeater Quantum tomography
- Awards: Fellow of the Royal Society (2026); John Stewart Bell Prize (2019); Herbert Walther Award (2016); Wolf Prize in Physics (2013); BBVA Foundation Frontiers of Knowledge Award (2008); Benjamin Franklin Medal (2010); Dirac Medal (2006); Max Planck Medal (2005)
- Scientific career
- Fields: Physicist
- Workplaces: University of Innsbruck
- Doctoral advisor: Fritz Ehlotzky

Peter Zoller, FRS (born 16 September 1952) is a theoretical physicist from Austria. He is an emeritus professor at the University of Innsbruck and is known for his pioneering research on quantum computing, quantum simulation and quantum communication.

== Biography ==
Peter Zoller studied physics at the University of Innsbruck, where he received his doctorate in February 1977 with a thesis on the Stark effect and then worked as an assistant at the Department of Theoretical Physics. In 1978/79, he was a Max Kade Fellow with Peter Lambropoulos at the University of Southern California and in 1980 he stayed in the group of Dan Walls at the University of Waikato, New Zealand. In 1981, Zoller handed in his work "Über die lichtstatistische Abhängigkeit resonanter Multiphoton-Prozesse" at the University of Innsbruck to become lecturer (Venia docendi). In 1981/82 and 1988 he was Visiting Fellow at the Joint Institute for Laboratory Astrophysics (JILA) at the University of Colorado, Boulder, and 1986 a visiting professor at the Université de Paris-Sud 11, Orsay.

In 1991, Zoller became Professor at the Physics Department of the University of Colorado, Boulder, and JILA Fellow. At the end of 1994, he accepted a chair at the University of Innsbruck, where he worked until 2024. From 1995 to 1999, he headed the Department of Theoretical Physics, from 2001 to 2004, he was vice-dean of studies. From 2003 to 2024, he was a Scientific Director at the Institute for Quantum Optics and Quantum Information (IQOQI) of the Austrian Academy of Sciences.

Zoller remained closely associated with JILA as an Adjoint Fellow. Numerous guest professorships have taken him to major centers of physics. Among others, he was Loeb Lecturer at Harvard University (2004) Yan Jici Chair Professor at the University of Science and Technology of China, Hefei, Chair Professor at Tsinghua University, Beijing (2004), Lorentz Professor at the University of Leiden, Netherlands (2005) and Distinguished Lecturer at the Technion in Haifa (2007). He was Moore Distinguished Scholar at Caltech (2008/2010), Arnold Sommerfeld Lecturer at LMU Munich (2010), Distinguished Fellow at the Max Planck Institute of Quantum Optics in Garching (2012) and Solvay Professor of Physics at the University of Brussels (2015). In 2014, he became "External Scientific Member" at the Max Planck Institute of Quantum Optics. In 2025, he was Benjamin Lee Professor in South Korea and was awarded a JAE Chair at the Spanish National Research Council CSIC in Madrid.

In 2018, Peter Zoller co-founded Alpine Quantum Technologies, a quantum computing hardware company. As a member of the Quantum Computing Advisory Board he is advicing the European Commission on the state of quantum computing in Europe.

== Research ==
As a theoretical physicist, Zoller has made significant contributions to atomic physics, many-body physics and quantum information science. In particular, his proposals on quantum computing with trapped ions, on quantum simulation with ultracold atoms in optical lattices and on quantum repeaters in quantum communication have made a decisive contribution to bringing theoretical concepts of quantum information into a laboratory setting. This has inspired and guided new experimental research directions and established quantum optical systems as one of the leading experimental platforms for quantum technologies.

In 1995, together with Ignacio Cirac, he proposed a “quantum computer with cold trapped ions”. This was the first experimentally realistic and comprehensive proposal for a universal quantum computer. This work triggered a rapid experimental development in which numerous pioneering achievements such as the demonstration of quantum algorithms, digital quantum simulations, quantum error correction and quantum metrology were achieved. In 1999, Cirac and Zoller proposed a quantum computer based on cold atoms in optical lattices, in which two-qubit gates are executed by controlled collisions. A year later, together with Mikhail Lukin and others, they presented an alternative way to implement these gates using Rydberg atoms. With the ever-improving experimental control of neutral atoms in laser tweezers, this approach is becoming increasingly important.

In 1998, Cirac and Zoller proposed the use of ultracold atoms in optical lattices as an analog quantum simulator for Hubbard models to investigate questions in solid-state physics. This approach allows strongly interacting many-body systems to be probed in both equilibrium and non-equilibrium states, addressing key questions in the theory and design of correlated quantum materials and in regimes challenging for classical calculations. The experimental development of this platform has led to a number of important advances, including the first observation of the transition between superfluidity and a Mott insulator, the creation and study of topological quantum phases of matter with synthetic gauge fields, and the exploration of the 2D fermionic Hubbard model.

Also in 1998, a team led by Zoller presented the concept of quantum repeaters, which overcame the problems associated with noise and the loss of photons in optical fibers and made quantum communication over long distances possible. Previously, they had discovered the possibility of entangling atoms by exchanging photons at a distance. In 2001, they proposed a specific atomic setup to build such quantum repeaters. These have become a crucial building block for the development and deployment of quantum communication.

Zoller's ideas and concepts attract widespread interest within the scientific community and his works are highly cited.

== Awards ==
Peter Zoller received honorary doctorates of the University of Amsterdam (2012), the University of Colorado Boulder (2019), and the University of Concepción (2024).

For his achievements in the field of quantum optics and quantum information and especially for his pioneering work on quantum computers, quantum simulation and quantum communication he als received numerous prizes, these include:

- Ludwig Boltzmann Prize (1983) of the Austrian Physical Society
- Wittgenstein Award (1998), Austria's highest scientific distinction
- Max Born Award (1998) of the Optical Society of America
- Schrödinger Prize (1998) of the Austrian Academy of Sciences
- Humboldt Research Award (2000)
- Max Planck Medal (2005) of the Deutsche Physikalische Gesellschaft
- UNESCO Niels Bohr Medal (2005)
- International Quantum Communication Award (2006)
- Dirac Medal of the ICTP (2006)
- BBVA Foundation Frontiers of Knowledge Award (2008), in the Basic Sciences category (with Ignacio Cirac)
- Benjamin Franklin Medal in Physics (2010) of the Franklin Institute (with Juan Ignacio Cirac and David Wineland)
- Hamburg Prize for Theoretical Physics (2011)
- Blaise Pascal Medal in Physics of the European Academy of Sciences (2011)
- David Ben Gurion Medal (2013)
- Wolf Prize in Physics (with Juan Ignacio Cirac) (2013)
- Herbert Walther Award from the OSA (2016)
- Willis E. Lamb Award for Laser Science and Quantum Optics (2018)
- Micius Quantum Prize (2018)
- Norman F. Ramsey Prize (2018) of the American Physical Society
- John Stewart Bell Prize (2019)
- Le Prix de l’Académie of the Royal Academy of Science, Letters and Fine Arts of Belgium (2025)

In 2001, Peter Zoller became full member of the Austrian Academy of Sciences. In 2008 he was elected to the United States National Academy of Sciences and the Royal Netherlands Academy of Arts and Sciences, in 2009 to the Spanish Royal Academy of Sciences, in 2010 to the German Academy of Sciences Leopoldina, in 2012 to the European Academy of Sciences, in 2013 to the Academia Europaea, in 2023 in the Accademia Nazionale dei Lincei, in 2024 to the Bavarian Academy of Sciences and Humanities, in 2025 to the Chinese Academy of Sciences and in 2026 to the Royal Society.

== Books ==
Peter Zoller and Crispin Gardiner have jointly written:

- Quantum Noise; Springer, Berlin Heidelberg, 2nd ed. 1999, 3rd ed. 2004 ISBN 3540223010
- The Quantum World of Ultra-Cold Atoms and Light Book I: Foundations of Quantum Optics, Imperial College Press, London and Singapore 2014. ISBN 9781783264605
- The Quantum World of Ultra-Cold Atoms and Light Book II: Physics of Quantum Optical Devices, Imperial College Press, London and Singapore 2015. ISBN 9781783266166
- The Quantum World of Ultra-Cold Atoms and Light Book III: Ultra-Cold Atoms, World Scientific, London and Singapore 2014. ISBN 9781786344175

== See also ==
- Open quantum system
- Quantum jump method
