= Trapped-ion quantum computer =

Proposed quantum computer implementation

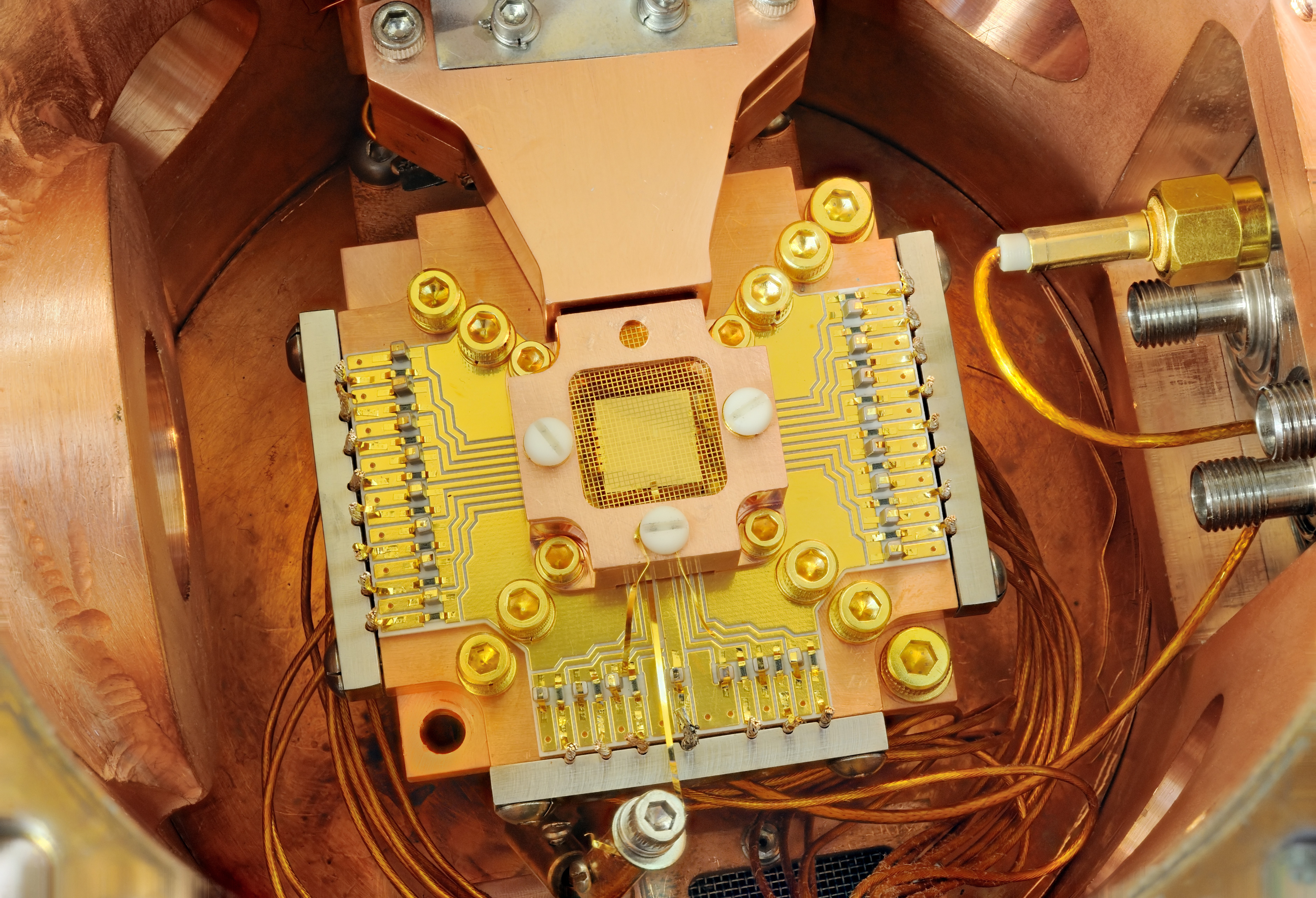
Chip ion trap for quantum computing from 2011 at NIST

A trapped-ion quantum computer (TIQC) is one proposed approach to a large-scale quantum computer. Ions, or charged atomic particles, can be confined and suspended in free space using electromagnetic fields. Qubits are stored in stable electronic states of each ion, and quantum information can be transferred through the collective quantized motion of the ions in a shared trap (interacting through the Coulomb force). Lasers are applied to induce coupling between the qubit states (for single qubit operations) or coupling between the internal qubit states and the external motional states (for entanglement between qubits).

The fundamental operations of a quantum computer have been demonstrated experimentally with the highest accuracy in trapped-ion systems. Promising schemes in development to scale the system to arbitrarily large numbers of qubits include transporting ions to spatially distinct locations in an array of ion traps, building large entangled states via photonically connected networks of remotely entangled ion chains, and combinations of these ideas. This makes the trapped-ion quantum computer system one of the most promising architectures for a scalable, universal quantum computer. As of December 2023, the largest number of particles to be controllably entangled is 32 trapped ions.

== History ==
The first implementation scheme for a controlled-NOT quantum gate was proposed by Ignacio Cirac and Peter Zoller in 1995, specifically for the trapped-ion system. The same year, a key step in the controlled-NOT gate was experimentally realized at NIST Ion Storage Group, and research in quantum computing began to accelerate worldwide.

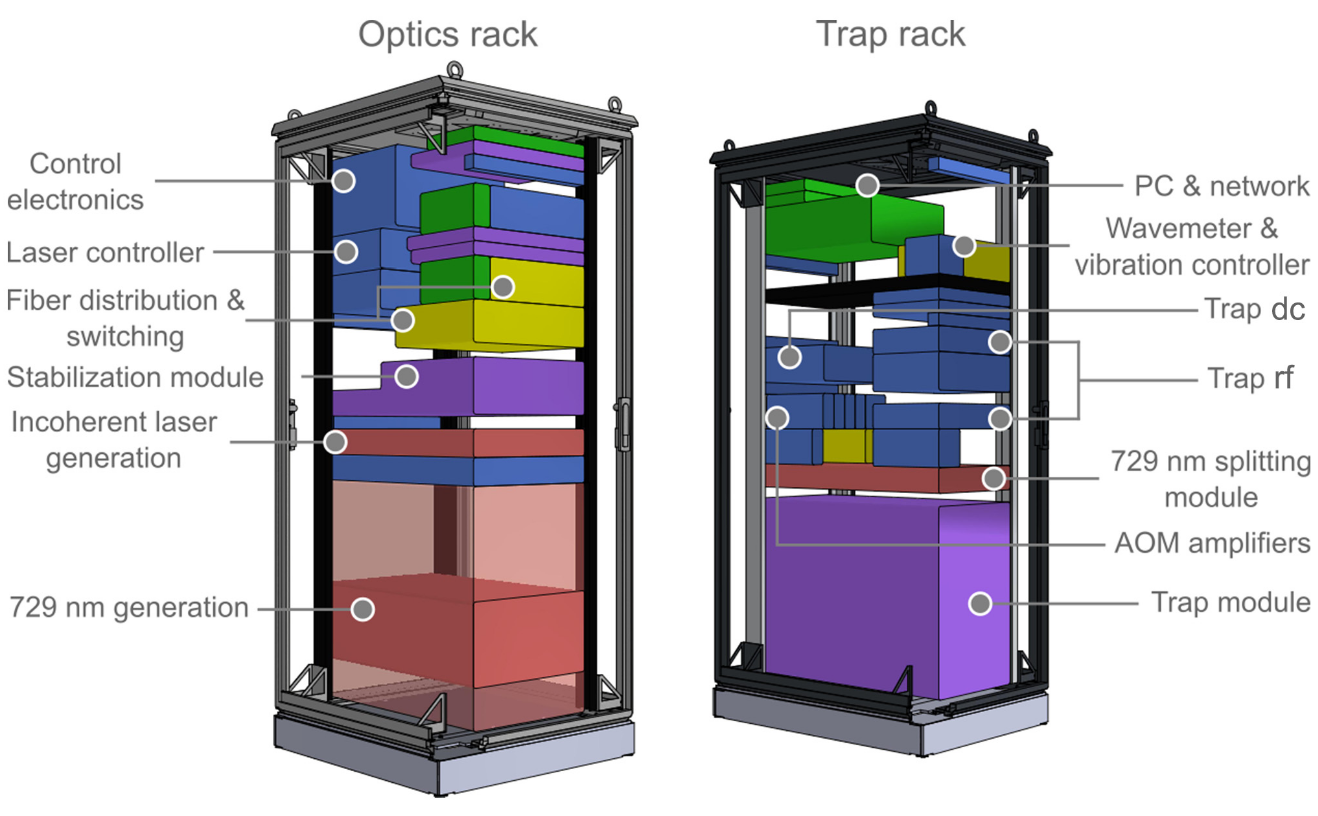
Simplified scale model

In 2021, researchers from the University of Innsbruck presented a quantum computing demonstrator that fits inside two 19-inch server racks, the world's first quality standards-meeting compact trapped-ion quantum computer.

== Paul trap ==
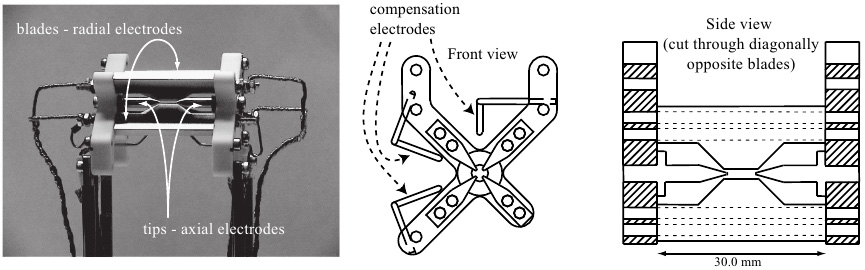
Classical linear Paul trap in Innsbruck for a string of calcium ions

The electrodynamic quadrupole ion trap now used in trapped-ion quantum computing research was invented in the 1950s by Wolfgang Paul (who received the Nobel Prize for his work in 1989). Charged particles cannot be trapped in 3D by only electrostatic forces because of Earnshaw's theorem. Instead, an electric field oscillating at radio frequency (RF) is applied, forming a potential with the shape of a saddle spinning at the RF frequency. If the RF field has the right parameters (oscillation frequency and field strength), the charged particle becomes effectively trapped at the saddle point by a restoring force, with the motion described by a set of Mathieu equations.

This saddle point is the point of minimized energy magnitude, $|E(\mathbf{x})|$, for the ions in the potential field. The Paul trap is often described as a harmonic potential well that traps ions in two dimensions (assume $\hat{x }$ and $\widehat{y}$ without loss of generality) and does not trap ions in the $\widehat{z}$ direction. When multiple ions are at the saddle point and the system is at equilibrium, the ions are only free to move in $\widehat{z}$. Therefore, the ions will repel each other and create a vertical configuration in $\widehat{z}$, the simplest case being a linear strand of only a few ions. Coulomb interactions of increasing complexity will create a more intricate ion configuration if many ions are initialized in the same trap. Furthermore, the additional vibrations of the added ions greatly complicate the quantum system, which makes initialization and computation more difficult.

Once trapped, the ions should be cooled such that $k_{\rm B}T\ll\hbar\omega_z$(see Lamb Dicke regime). This can be achieved by a combination of Doppler cooling and resolved sideband cooling. At this very low temperature, vibrational energy in the ion trap is quantized into phonons by the energy eigenstates of the ion strand, which are called the center of mass vibrational modes. A single phonon's energy is given by the relation $\hbar\omega_z$. These quantum states occur when the trapped ions vibrate together and are isolated from the external environment. If the ions are not properly isolated, noise can result from ions interacting with external electromagnetic fields, which creates random movement and destroys the quantized energy states.

== Requirements for quantum computation ==
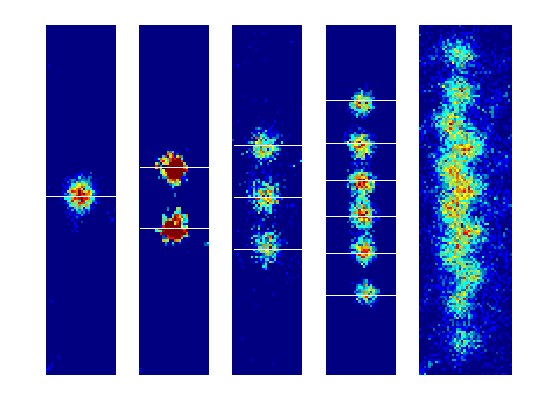
Magnesium ions in a trap

The full requirements for a functional quantum computer are not entirely known, but there are many generally accepted requirements. David DiVincenzo outlined several of these criteria for quantum computing.

=== Qubits ===
Any two-level quantum system can form a qubit, and there are two predominant ways to form a qubit using the electronic states of an ion:

1. Two ground state hyperfine levels (these are called "hyperfine qubits")
2. A ground state level and an excited level (these are called the "optical qubits")

Hyperfine qubits are extremely long-lived (decay time of the order of thousands to millions of years) and phase/frequency stable (traditionally used for atomic frequency standards). Optical qubits are also relatively long-lived (with a decay time of the order of a second), compared to the logic gate operation time (which is of the order of microseconds). The use of each type of qubit poses its own distinct challenges in the laboratory.

=== Initialization ===
Ionic qubit states can be prepared in a specific qubit state using a process called optical pumping. In this process, a laser couples the ion to some excited states which eventually decay to one state which is not coupled to the laser. Once the ion reaches that state, it has no excited levels to couple to in the presence of that laser and, therefore, remains in that state. If the ion decays to one of the other states, the laser will continue to excite the ion until it decays to the state that does not interact with the laser. This initialization process is standard in many physics experiments and can be performed with extremely high fidelity (>99.9%).

The system's initial state for quantum computation can therefore be described by the ions in their hyperfine and motional ground states, resulting in an initial center of mass phonon state of $|0\rangle$ (zero phonons).

=== Measurement ===
Measuring the state of the qubit stored in an ion is quite simple. Typically, a laser is applied to the ion that couples only one of the qubit states. When the ion collapses into this state during the measurement process, the laser will excite it, resulting in a photon being released when the ion decays from the excited state. After decay, the ion is continually excited by the laser and repeatedly emits photons. These photons can be collected by a photomultiplier tube (PMT) or a charge-coupled device (CCD) camera. If the ion collapses into the other qubit state, then it does not interact with the laser and no photon is emitted. By counting the number of collected photons, the state of the ion may be determined with a very high accuracy (>99.99%).

=== Arbitrary single qubit rotation ===
One of the requirements of universal quantum computing is to coherently change the state of a single qubit. For example, this can transform a qubit starting out in 0 into any arbitrary superposition of 0 and 1 defined by the user. In a trapped-ion system, this is often done using magnetic dipole transitions or stimulated Raman transitions for hyperfine qubits and electric quadrupole transitions for optical qubits. The term "rotation" alludes to the Bloch sphere representation of a qubit pure state. Gate fidelity can be greater than 99%.

The rotation operators $R_x(\theta)$ and $R_y(\theta)$ can be applied to individual ions by manipulating the frequency of an external electromagnetic field from and exposing the ions to the field for specific amounts of time. These controls create a Hamiltonian of the form $H_I^i=\hbar\Omega/2(S_+\exp(i\phi)+S_-\exp(-i\phi))$. Here, $S_+$ and $S_-$ are the raising and lowering operators of spin (see Ladder operator). These rotations are the universal building blocks for single-qubit gates in quantum computing.

To obtain the Hamiltonian for the ion-laser interaction, apply the Jaynes–Cummings model. Once the Hamiltonian is found, the formula for the unitary operation performed on the qubit can be derived using the principles of quantum time evolution. Although this model utilizes the rotating wave approximation, it proves to be effective for the purposes of trapped-ion quantum computing.

=== Two qubit entangling gates ===
Besides the controlled-NOT gate proposed by Cirac and Zoller in 1995, many equivalent, but more robust, schemes have been proposed and implemented experimentally since. Recent theoretical work by JJ. Garcia-Ripoll, Cirac, and Zoller have shown that there are no fundamental limitations to the speed of entangling gates, but gates in this impulsive regime (faster than 1 microsecond) have not yet been demonstrated experimentally. The fidelity of these implementations has been greater than 99%.

=== Scalable trap designs ===
Quantum computers must be capable of initializing, storing, and manipulating many qubits at once in order to solve difficult computational problems. However, as previously discussed, a finite number of qubits can be stored in each trap while still maintaining their computational abilities. It is therefore necessary to design interconnected ion traps that are capable of transferring information from one trap to another. Ions can be separated from the same interaction region to individual storage regions and brought back together without losing the quantum information stored in their internal states. Ions can also be made to turn corners at a "T" junction, allowing a two dimensional trap array design. Semiconductor fabrication techniques have also been employed to manufacture the new generation of traps, making the 'ion trap on a chip' a reality. An example is the quantum charge-coupled device (QCCD) designed by D. Kielpinski, Christopher Monroe and David J. Wineland. QCCDs resemble mazes of electrodes with designated areas for storing and manipulating qubits.

The variable electric potential created by the electrodes can both trap ions in specific regions and move them through the transport channels, which negates the necessity of containing all ions in a single trap. Ions in the QCCD's memory region are isolated from any operations and therefore the information contained in their states is kept for later use. Gates, including those that entangle two ion states, are applied to qubits in the interaction region by the method already described in this article.

==== Decoherence in scalable traps ====
When an ion is being transported between regions in an interconnected trap and is subjected to a nonuniform magnetic field, decoherence can occur in the form of the equation below (see Zeeman effect). This effectively changes the relative phase of the quantum state. The up and down arrows correspond to a general superposition qubit state, in this case the ground and excited states of the ion.

$\left|\uparrow\right\rangle + \left|\downarrow\right\rangle\longrightarrow \exp(i\alpha)\left|\uparrow\right\rangle + \left|\downarrow\right\rangle$

Additional relative phases could arise from physical movements of the trap or the presence of unintended electric fields. If the user could determine the parameter α, accounting for this decoherence would be relatively simple, as known quantum information processes exist for correcting a relative phase. However, since α from the interaction with the magnetic field is path-dependent, the problem is highly complex. Considering the multiple ways that decoherence of a relative phase can be introduced in an ion trap, reimagining the ion state in a new basis that minimizes decoherence could be a way to eliminate the issue.

One way to combat decoherence is to represent the quantum state in a new basis called the decoherence-free subspaces, or DFS., with basis states $\left|\uparrow\downarrow\right\rangle$ and $\left|\downarrow\uparrow\right\rangle$. The DFS is actually the subspace of two ion states, such that if both ions acquire the same relative phase, the total quantum state in the DFS will be unaffected.

== Challenges ==
Trapped-ion quantum computers theoretically meet all of DiVincenzo's criteria for quantum computing, but implementation of the system can be quite difficult. The main challenges facing trapped-ion quantum computing are the initialization of the ion's motional states, and the relatively brief lifetimes of the phonon states. Decoherence also proves to be challenging to eliminate, and is caused when the qubits interact with the external environment undesirably.

=== CNOT gate implementation ===
The controlled NOT gate is a crucial component for quantum computing, as any quantum gate can be created by a combination of CNOT gates and single-qubit rotations. It is therefore important that a trapped-ion quantum computer can perform this operation by meeting the following three requirements.

First, the trapped-ion quantum computer must be able to perform arbitrary rotations on qubits, which are already discussed in the "arbitrary single-qubit rotation" section.

The next component of a CNOT gate is the controlled phase-flip gate, or the controlled-Z gate (see quantum logic gate). In a trapped-ion quantum computer, the state of the center of mass phonon functions as the control qubit, and the internal atomic spin state of the ion is the working qubit. The phase of the working qubit will therefore be flipped if the phonon qubit is in the state $|1\rangle$.

Lastly, a SWAP gate must be implemented, acting on both the ion state and the phonon state.

Two alternate schemes to represent the CNOT gates are presented in Michael Nielsen and Isaac Chuang's Quantum Computation and Quantum Information and Cirac and Zoller's Quantum Computation with Cold Trapped Ions.

== Additional resources ==
- Wineland, D. J.; Monroe, C.; Itano, W. M.; Leibfried, D.; King, B. E.; Meekhof, D. M. (1998). "Experimental Issues in Coherent Quantum-State Manipulation of Trapped Atomic Ions". Journal of Research of the National Institute of Standards and Technology. 103 (3): 259–328. arXiv:quant-ph/9710025. doi:10.6028/jres.103.019. PMC 4898965. PMID 28009379.
- Leibfried, D; Blatt, R; Monroe, C; Wineland, D (2003). "Quantum dynamics of single trapped ions". Reviews of Modern Physics. 75 (1): 281–324. Bibcode:2003RvMP...75..281L. doi:10.1103/revmodphys.75.281.
- Steane, A. (1997). "The ion trap quantum information processor". Appl. Phys. B. 64 (6): 623–643. arXiv:quant-ph/9608011. Bibcode:1996ApPhB..64..623S. doi:10.1007/s003400050225. S2CID 2061791.
- Monroe, C.; et al. (1995). "Demonstration of a Fundamental Quantum Logic Gate". Phys. Rev. Lett. 75 (25): 4714–4717. Bibcode:1995PhRvL..75.4714M. doi:10.1103/physrevlett.75.4714. PMID 10059979.
- Friedenauer, A.; Schmitz, H.; Glueckert, J. T.; Porras, D.; Schaetz, T. (2008). "Simulating a quantum magnet with trapped ions". Nature Physics. 4 (10): 757–761. arXiv:0802.4072. Bibcode:2008NatPh...4..757F. doi:10.1038/nphys1032.
- Moehring, D. L.; Maunz, P.; Olmschenk, S.; Younge, K. C.; Matsukevich, D. N.; Duan, L.-M.; Monroe, C. (2007). "Entanglement of single-atom quantum bits at a distance". Nature. 449 (7158): 68–71. Bibcode:2007Natur.449...68M. doi:10.1038/nature06118. hdl:2027.42/62780. PMID 17805290. S2CID 19624141.
- Stick, D.; Hensinger, W. K.; Olmschenk, S.; Madsen, M. J.; Schwab, K.; Monroe, C. (2006). "Ion trap in a semiconductor chip". Nature Physics. 2 (1): 36–39. arXiv:quant-ph/0601052. Bibcode:2006NatPh...2...36S. doi:10.1038/nphys171. S2CID 5419269.
- Leibfried, D.; Knill, E.; Seidelin, S.; Britton, J.; Blakestad, R. B.; Chiaverini, J.; Hume, D. B.; Itano, W. M.; Jost, J. D.; Langer, C.; Ozeri, R.; Reichle, R.; Wineland, D. J. (2005). "Creation of a six-atom 'Schrödinger cat' state". Nature. 438 (7068): 639–642. Bibcode:2005Natur.438..639L. doi:10.1038/nature04251. PMID 16319885. S2CID 4370887.
- Häffner, H.; Hänsel, W.; Roos, C. F.; Benhelm, J.; Chek-al-kar, D.; Chwalla, M.; Körber, T.; Rapol, U. D.; Riebe, M.; Schmidt, P. O.; Becher, C.; Gühne, O.; Dür, W.; Blatt, R. (2005). "Scalable multiparticle entanglement of trapped ions". Nature. 438 (7068): 643–646. arXiv:quant-ph/0603217. Bibcode:2005Natur.438..643H. doi:10.1038/nature04279. PMID 16319886. S2CID 4411480.
- Chiaverini, J.; Britton, J.; Leibfried, D.; Knill, E.; Barrett, M. D.; Blakestad, R. B.; Itano, W.M.; Jost, J.D.; Langer, C.; Ozeri, R.; Schaetz, T.; Wineland, D.J. (2005). "Implementation of the semiclassical quantum Fourier transform in a scalable system". Science. 308 (5724): 997–1000. Bibcode:2005Sci...308..997C. doi:10.1126/science.1110335. PMID 15890877. S2CID 15550997.
- Blinov, B. B.; Moehring, D. L.; Duan, L.- M.; Monroe, C. (2004). "Observation of entanglement between a single trapped atom and a single photon" (PDF). Nature. 428 (6979): 153–157. Bibcode:2004Natur.428..153B. doi:10.1038/nature02377. hdl:2027.42/62924. PMID 15014494. S2CID 4314514.
- Chiaverini, J.; Leibried, D.; Schaetz, T.; Barrett, M. D.; Blakestad, R. B.; Britton, J.; Itano, W.M.; Jost, J.D.; Knill, E.; Langer, C.; Ozeri, R.; Wineland, D.J. (2004). "Realization of quantum error correction". Nature. 432 (7017): 602–605. Bibcode:2004Natur.432..602C. doi:10.1038/nature03074. PMID 15577904. S2CID 167898.
- Riebe, M.; Häffner, H.; Roos, C. F.; Hänsel, W.; Benhelm, J.; Lancaster, G. P. T.; Körber, T. W.; Becher, C.; Schmidt-Kaler, F.; James, D. F. V.; Blatt, R. (2004). "Deterministic quantum teleportation with atoms". Nature. 429 (6993): 734–737. Bibcode:2004Natur.429..734R. doi:10.1038/nature02570. PMID 15201903. S2CID 4397716.
- Barrett, M. D.; Chiaverini, J.; Schaetz, T.; Britton, J.; Itano, W.M.; Jost, J.D.; Knill, E.; Langer, C.; Leibfried, D.; Ozeri, R.; Wineland, D.J. (2004). "Deterministic quantum teleportation of atomic qubits". Nature. 429 (6993): 737–739. Bibcode:2004Natur.429..737B. doi:10.1038/nature02608. PMID 15201904. S2CID 1608775.
- Roos, C. F.; Riebe, M.; Häffner, H.; Hänsel, W.; Benhelm, J.; Lancaster, G. P. T.; Becher, C.; Schmidt-Kaler, F.; Blatt, R. (2004). "Control and measurement of three-qubit entangled state". Science. 304 (5676): 1478–1480. Bibcode:2004Sci...304.1478R. doi:10.1126/science.1097522. PMID 15178795. S2CID 12020439.
