= Lamb Dicke regime =

Hypothesis in Quantum Physics

In ion trapping and atomic physics experiments, the Lamb Dicke regime (or Lamb Dicke limit) is a quantum regime within an atom-light field system in which the spatial extent of the atom's wavefunction is much smaller than the wavelength of the addressing light field. In this regime, the coupling between an ion or atom's internal qubit states and its motional states is sufficiently small so that transitions that change the motional quantum number by more than one are strongly suppressed.

This condition is quantitively expressed by the inequality

$$\eta^2 (2n+1) \ll 1,$$

where $\eta$ is the Lamb–Dicke parameter and $n$ is the motional quantum number of the ion or atom's harmonic oscillator state.

== Lamb Dicke parameter ==
Considering the ion's motion along the direction of the static trapping potential of an ion trap (the axial motion in $z$-direction), the trap potential can be validly approximated as quadratic around the equilibrium position and the ion's motion locally be considered as that of a quantum harmonic oscillator with quantum harmonic oscillator eigenstates $|n\rangle$. In this case the position operator $\hat{z}$ is given by

$$\hat{z} = z_0 (\hat{a} + \hat{a}^\dagger).$$

where

$$z_0 = \sqrt{\langle 0\vert \hat{z}^2 \vert 0\rangle} = \sqrt{\frac{\hbar}{2m\omega_z}}$$

is the spread of the zero-point wavefunction, $\omega_z$ is the frequency of the static harmonic trapping potential in $z$-direction and $\hat{a},\hat{a}^\dagger$ are the ladder operators of the harmonic oscillator. The Lamb Dicke regime corresponds to the condition

$$\sqrt{\langle\Psi_{\rm motion}\vert k^2_z \hat{z}^2 \vert \Psi_{\rm motion}} \rangle \ll 1$$

where $\vert\Psi_{\rm motion}\rangle$ is the state describing the motional degree of freedom of the particle's state and $k_z = \mathbf{k}\cdot \vec{e_z} = |\mathbf{k}|\cos\theta = \frac{2\pi}{\lambda}\cos\theta$ ($\vec{e_z}$ is the unit vector in z-direction) is the projection of the wavevector of the light field acting on the ion on the $z$-direction.

The Lamb–Dicke parameter actually is defined as

$$\eta = k_z z_0.$$

Upon absorption or emission of a photon with momentum $\hbar k_z$ the kinetic energy of the ion is changed by the amount of the recoil energy $E_{\rm R} = \hbar \omega_{\rm R}$ where the definition of the recoil frequency is

$$\omega_{\rm R} = \frac{\hbar k_z^2}{2 m}.$$

The square of the Lamb Dicke parameter then is given by

$$\eta^2 = \frac{\omega_{\rm R}}{\omega_z} = \frac{\mathrm{change~in~kinetic~energy}}{\mathrm{quantized\, energy\, spacing\, of\, HO}}.$$

Hence the Lamb Dicke parameter $\eta$ quantifies the coupling strength between internal states and motional states of an ion. If the Lamb Dicke parameter is much smaller than one, the quantized energy spacing of the harmonic oscillator is larger than the recoil energy and transitions changing the motional state of the ion are negligible. The Lamb Dicke parameter being small is necessary, but not a sufficient condition for the Lamb Dicke regime.

== Mathematical background ==
In ion trapping experiments, laser fields are used to couple the internal state of an ion with its motional state. The mechanical recoil of the ion upon absorption or emission of a photon is described by the operators $\exp(\pm i k_z z)$. These operators induce a displacement of the atomic momentum by the quantity $\pm\hbar k_z$ for the absorption (+) or emission (-) of a laser photon. In the basis of harmonic oscillator eigenstates $\{\vert n\rangle\}_{n \in \mathbb N_0}$, the probability for the transition $\vert n\rangle \rightarrow \vert n^\prime\rangle$ is given by the Franck-Condon coefficients

$$F_{n\rightarrow n^\prime} = \langle n^\prime \vert \exp(ik_z z) \vert n\rangle = \langle n^\prime \vert \exp(i \eta (\hat{a} + \hat{a}^\dagger))\vert n\rangle.$$

If the condition for the Lamb-Dicke regime is met, a Taylor expansion is possible,

$$\exp(i\eta(\hat{a} + \hat{a}^\dagger)) = 1 + i \eta(\hat{a} + \hat{a}^\dagger) + O(\eta^2).$$

The ladder operators act on the state $\vert n\rangle$ according to the rules $\hat{a}^\dagger|n\rangle = \sqrt{n + 1} | n + 1\rangle$ and $\hat{a}|n\rangle = \sqrt{n} | n - 1\rangle$. If $\eta$ is small, the $O(\eta^2)$ terms can be neglected, and the term $\exp(ik_z z) \vert n\rangle$ can therefore be approximated as $|n\rangle + i\eta\sqrt{n + 1} | n + 1\rangle + i\eta \sqrt{n} | n - 1\rangle$. Since $\langle n^\prime | n \rangle = 0$ unless $n^\prime = n$, this expression vanishes unless $n^\prime \in \{n, n+1, n-1\}$, and it is readily seen that transitions between motional states which change the motional quantum number $n$ by more than one are strongly suppressed.

== Applicability ==
In the Lamb Dicke regime spontaneous decay occurs predominantly at the frequency of the qubit's internal transition (carrier frequency) and therefore does not affect the ion's motional state most of the time. This is a necessary requirement for resolved sideband cooling to work efficiently.

Reaching the Lamb Dicke regime is a requirement for many of the schemes used to perform coherent operations on ions. It therefore establishes the upper limit on the temperature of ions in order for these methods to create entanglement. During manipulations on ions with laser pulses, the ions cannot be laser cooled. They must therefore be initially cooled down to a temperature such that they stay in the Lamb Dicke regime during the entire manipulation process that creates entanglement.

== See also ==
- Laser cooling
- Resolved sideband cooling
