= Nicole El Karoui =

French mathematician (born 1944)

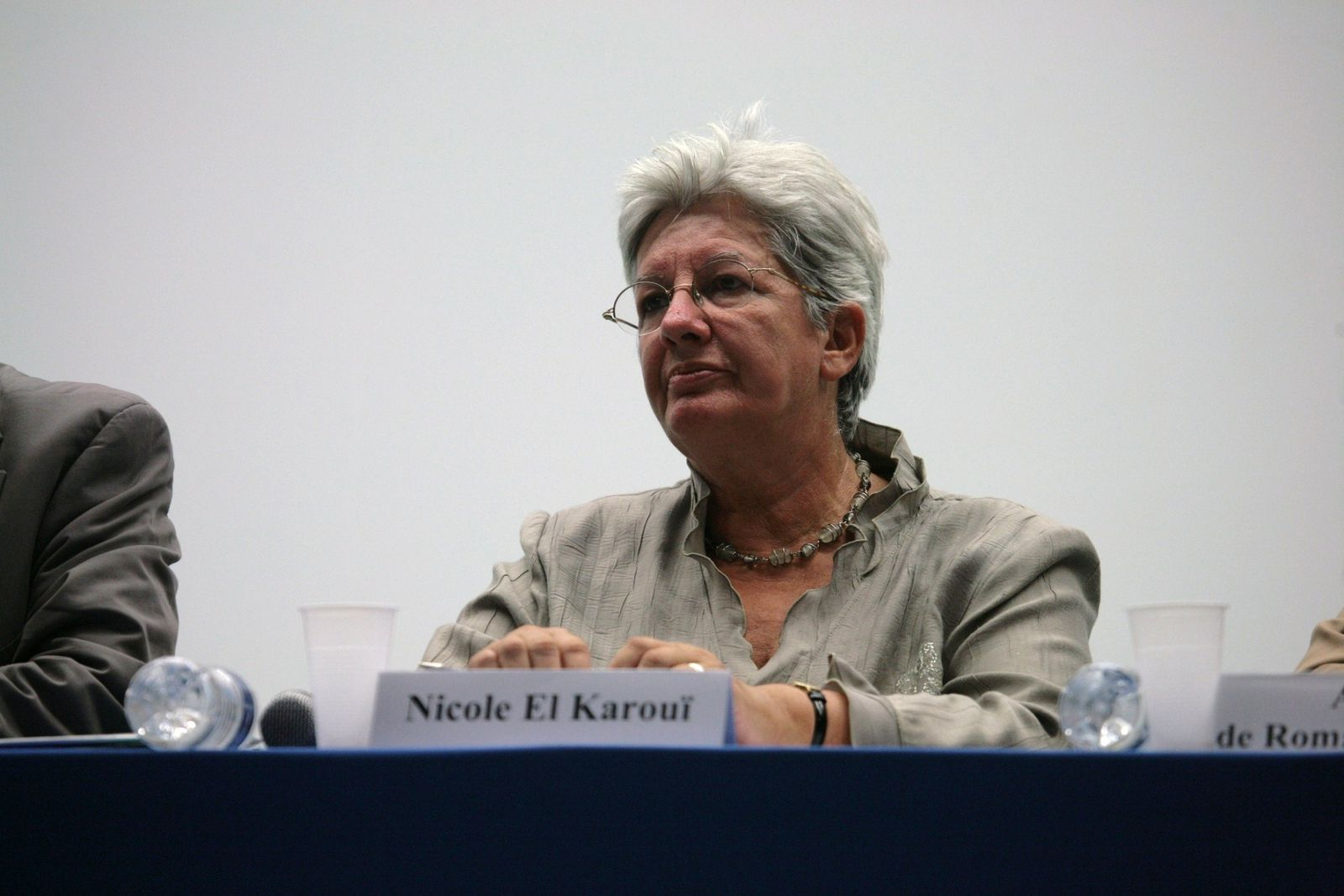
- El Karoui in 2008
- Born: Nicole Schvartz; 29 May 1944 (age 81); Paris, France
- Known for: Contributions to probability theory and mathematical finance
- Scientific career
- Fields: Mathematics
- Institutions: Paris VI University, Ecole Polytechnique
- Doctoral students: Pauline Barrieu; Monique Jeanblanc; Sylvie Méléard; Sylvie Roelly

Nicole El Karoui (née Schvartz) is a French mathematician and pioneer in the development of mathematical finance, born 29 May 1944 in Paris. She is considered one of the pioneers on the French school of mathematical finance and trained many engineers and scientists in this field. She is Professor Emeritus of Applied Mathematics at Sorbonne University, and held professorship positions at the École Polytechnique and Université du Maine. Her research has contributed to the application of probability and stochastic differential equations to modeling and risk management in financial markets.

== Teaching ==
The reputation of Professor El Karoui's classes is such that Wall Street Journal opines that there may be too many of her students in important positions handling financial derivatives. In an interview with the Wall Street Journal, Rama Cont, Professor of Mathematical Finance at the University of Oxford, described a degree with Ms. El Karoui's name on it as "the magic word that opened doors for young people."

El Karoui was the co-director, with Marc Yor and Gilles Pagès, of the Masters program in Probability & Finance, jointly operated by École Polytechnique and the Pierre and Marie Curie University (Paris VI), which she co-founded with Hélyette Geman. This program, usually called "DEA El Karoui", is one of the most prestigious programs in quantitative finance in the world and No 1 in France.

== Scientific contributions ==
Nicole El Karoui's research is focused on probability theory, stochastic control theory and mathematical finance. Her contributions focused on the mathematical theory of stochastic control, backward stochastic differential equations and their application in mathematical finance.

She is particularly known for her work on the robustness of the Black-Scholes hedging strategy, superhedging of contingent claims and the change of numéraire method for option pricing.

Among El Karoui's contributions to mathematical finance is her elegant formula for expressing the covariance relationship between the futures price and the forward price of an asset. The El Karoui futures-forward covariance formula states

$H(t) - G(t) = \int_{t}^{T} \mathrm{Cov}^{Q(s)} [r(s),H(s)|\mathcal{F}_t] \ ds,$

where $H$ is the price of a futures contract, $G$ is the price of a forward contract, $r$ is the spot interest rate process and $Q(s)$ is the probability measure under which asset prices are martingales with the discount bond of maturity $s$ selected as numeraire.

== Selected publications ==
- El Karoui, Nicole (1981). "Les Aspects Probabilistes Du Controle Stochastique". Ecole d'Eté de Probabilités de Saint-Flour IX-1979. Lecture Notes in Mathematics. Vol. 876. pp. 73–238. doi:10.1007/BFb0097499. ISBN 978-3-540-10860-3.
- El Karoui, Nicole; Quenez, Marie-Claire (1995). "Dynamic Programming and Pricing of Contingent Claims in an Incomplete Market". SIAM J. Control Optim. 33: 29–66. doi:10.1137/S0363012992232579.
- El Karoui, Nicole; Jeanblanc, Monique; Shreve, Steven (1998). "Robustness of the Black and Scholes Formula". Mathematical Finance. 8 (2): 93–126. CiteSeerX 10.1.1.321.744. doi:10.1111/1467-9965.00047. S2CID 15356566.
- El Karoui, Nicole; Quenez, Marie-Claire; Peng, Shige (1997). "Backward Stochastic Differential Equations in Finance". Mathematical Finance. 7: 1–71. doi:10.1111/1467-9965.00022. S2CID 53057679.
- El Karoui, Nicole; Geman, Helyette; Rochet, Jean-Charles (1995). "Changes of Numeraire, Changes of Probability Measure and Option Pricing". Journal of Applied Probability. 32 (2): 443–458. doi:10.2307/3215299. JSTOR 3215299. S2CID 124199920.

== Awards ==
Professor El Karoui is a Chevalier de l'ordre de la légion d'honneur.
