= Wolfgang Patsch =

Austrian physician

- Born: 10 August 1946 (age 80); Wels, Austria
- Known for: Atherosclerosis, metabolism
- Scientific career
- Fields: Atherosclerosis, metabolism
- Workplaces: Paracelsus Private Medical University of Salzburg

Wolfgang Patsch (born 10 August 1946) is an Austrian physician, specialized in internal medicine/laboratory medicine and a professor in the Department of Pharmacology and Toxicology at the Paracelsus Private Medical University of Salzburg. He is known for his work in the fields of atherosclerosis, common metabolic disorders such as obesity, insulin resistance and type-2 diabetes and neurodegenerative disorders.

== Biography ==
Wolfgang Patsch studied medicine at the universities of Innsbruck and Vienna from 1964 to 71. In 1971 he was promoted to doctor of medicine sub auspiciis by the President of Austria in Innsbruck. He received further education in biochemistry at the University of Uppsala 1978 and in site directed mutagenesis in Washington D.C. 1985. Patsch began his career as a resident in the Department of Internal Medicine at the University of Innsbruck in 1971. He obtained his licensure for internal medicine in 1977 and was named assistant professor. Patsch moved to the United States in 1978 to work in the Departments of Medicine and Preventive Medicine at the Washington University School of Medicine, where he obtained his medical licensure for the state of Missouri. From 1982 to 1993 he joined the Department of Medicine at Baylor College of Medicine in Houston, where he moved through the ranks to become full professor in 1990. From 1982 to 93 he was director of the Atherosclerosis Laboratory at Baylor College of Medicine and Houston Methodist Hospital and from 1987 to 1993 also director of the CDC-Cholesterol Reference Laboratory. He was board-certified for internal medicine in 1987 and obtained his medical licensure for Texas in 1988.

Patsch moved back to Austria in 1993 to become chairman of the Department of Laboratory Medicine at the Landeskliniken Salzburg, Austria until 2011. 1998 he was named Außerordentlicher Universitätsprofessor, Austria. Patsch is a cofounder of the Paracelsus Medical University (PMU) of Salzburg. From its conception he was involved in the steering committee and was Dean of Research of the PMU from 2003 to 2006. In 2006 Patsch was named full professor at the PMU and also appointed university professor at the Institute of Laboratory Medicine. Since 2011 he has been a professor in the Department for Pharmacology and Toxicology Patsch headed numerous scientific projects sponsored by the National Institutes of Health (NIH), the American Heart Association, the Austrian Science Fund and the Federal Ministry of Science and Research, Austria.

== Scientific contribution ==
As disturbances in plasma lipid and lipoprotein transport are established risk factors for atherosclerotic diseases such as myocardial infarction and stroke the initial scientific activities of Patsch focused on the characterization of human lipoproteins. Using zonal ultracentrifugation methods developed by Josef R. Patsch (and in collaboration with him), a detailed physical and chemical description of very low-density and high-density lipoproteins was completed. The methods of lipoprotein isolation, developed in Innsbruck, were used by Patsch for many clinical studies at Washington University in St. Louis. In the laboratory of Gustav Schonfeld, Patsch used rat liver perfusions and primary rat hepatocyte cultures to determine the effects of diets and hormones such as insulin and thyroid hormone on hepatic lipoprotein biosynthesis. These studies were continued at Baylor College of Medicine in Houston in collaboration with W. Strobl and S.M. Soyal. In a collaborative effort with Josef R. Patsch and Antonio M. Gotto, the strong predictive value of the magnitude of postprandial lipemia for coronary heart disease was established. Patsch was one of the principal investigators of the Atherosclerosis Risk in Communities Study (ARIC) from 1985-94. As atherosclerotic disease is often asymptomatic for many years, knowledge about the quantitative importance of risk factors is essential to effectively manage the disorder and reduce its life-threatening sequels. ARIC investigators ascertained the effect size of numerous established and candidate risk factors in well characterized populations using the intima-media thickness of the common carotid arteries as surrogate marker for atherosclerosis and cardiovascular endpoints as outcomes. Patsch contributed to several research projects that quantified the risk associated with plasma lipoproteins including lipoprotein(a) in the fasting and postprandial state. After his return to Austria, Patsch concentrated on genetic and functional aspect of energy metabolism. A main research focus was PGC-1alpha, a transcriptional co-activator that orchestrates several biological programs including mitochondrial biogenesis. Other genetic factors with relevance for obesity, type 2 diabetes and the metabolic syndrome also were studied in collaboration with H. Esterbauer, H. Oberkofler, T. Felder and F. Krempler. More recently, S.M. Soyal and Patsch discovered brain-specific isoforms of PGC-1alpha which are likely to play a role in neurodegenerative disorders such as Huntington's disease, amyotrophic lateral sclerosis and Parkinson's disease.

Apart from his research activities, Patsch contributed to the Sciences as reviewer for numerous medical journals, as organizer of medical congresses and as committee member and/or expert for research support-providing institutions such as NIH, NHLBI and NIDDK, the Swiss National Science Foundation, the Israel Science Foundation, the Netherlands Genomic Initiative, Dutch Ministry of Economic Affairs and the EU.

== Academic Memberships ==
Patsch is a member in the advisory or editorial boards of several scientific magazines:

- Diabetologia (2003-2005)
- Current Diabetes Reviews (since 2004)
- Adipocytes (since 2004)
- Open General and Internal Medicine Journal OGIM (since 2007)

== Honors and awards ==
- 1971 Promotion Sub auspiciis Praesidentis of Austria
- 1974 Unilever award, Vienna
- 1975/76/94 Hoechst-Stiftung, Innsbruck, Graz and Wien
- 1979 Ärztekammerpreis, Tirol and Vorarlberg
- 1987 American Board of Internal Medicine, unter den 2 Prozent besten Prüfungskandidaten
- 1990/91/94 Österreichpreis der Gesellschaft für Kinder- und Jugendheilkunde
- 1999 Hans-Wendt-Prize der Salzburger Ärztegesellschaft
- 1999 Austrian Atherosclerosis Society Prize
- 2000 Austrian Laboratory Society Prize
- 2005 Among top 5% recipients of grants distributed by NIH between 1980-2004
- 2012 Sanofi-Prize, Austria

== Publications ==
PubMed
