= Damir Filipović =

Swiss mathematician

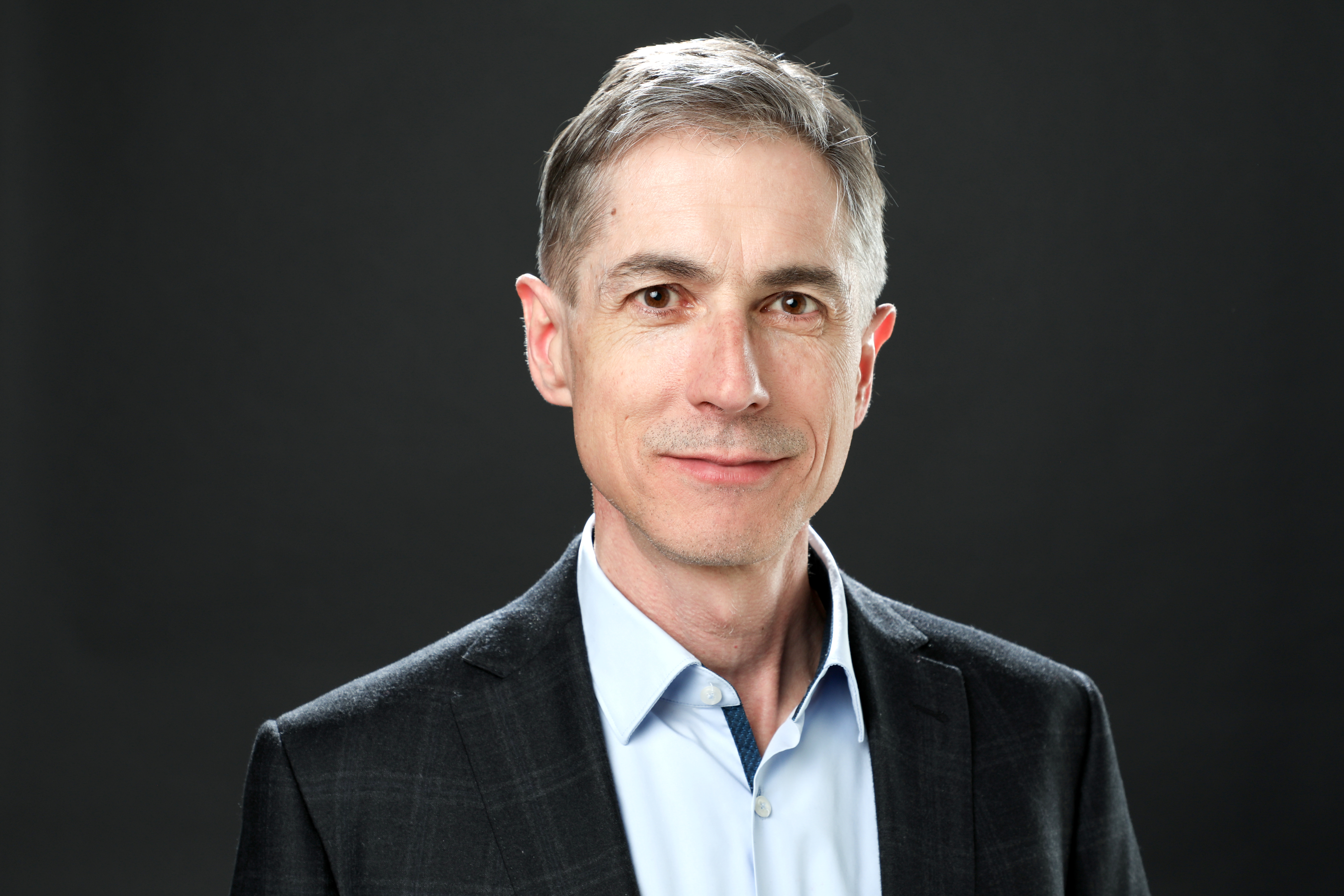
- Damir Filipović in 2021
- Born: 1970 (age 55–56)
- Awards: Louis Bachelier Prize

Academic background
- Education: Mathematics
- Alma mater: ETH Zurich
- Doctoral advisor: Freddy Delbaen

Academic work
- Discipline: Mathematics
- Sub-discipline: Quantitative finance
- Institutions: École Polytechnique Fédérale de Lausanne (EPFL)
- Main interests: Machine learning in finance Quantitative finance Quantitative risk management Stochastic models
- Website: https://www.epfl.ch/labs/csf

Damir Filipović (born 1970 in Switzerland) is a Swiss mathematician specializing in quantitative finance. He holds the Swissquote Chair in Quantitative Finance and is the director of the Swiss Finance Institute at EPFL (École Polytechnique Fédérale de Lausanne).

== Career ==
Filipović studied mathematics at ETH Zurich and earned his Master's degree in 1995. He joined Freddy Delbaen as PhD student and graduated in 2000 with thesis on mathematical finance titled "Consistency problems for HJM interest rate models".

As a postdoctoral research fellow he joined Vienna University of Technology (2000), Stanford University (2001) and Princeton University (2001) to work on consistency problems for Heath-Jarrow-Morton interest rate models and affine processes and applications in finance.

From 2002 to 2003, he was an assistant professor at Princeton University's Department of Operations Research and Financial Engineering. As scientific consultant for solvency testing and risk analysis in insurance (Swiss Solvency Test) he joined the Swiss Federal Office of Private Insurance (BPV) in 2003. In 2004, he became full professor on the Chair of Financial and Insurance Mathematics at LMU Munich. In 2007, he was appointed as director of the Vienna Institute of Finance and full professor at the University of Vienna.

Since 2010, he has been the Swissquote Chair in Quantitative Finance and director of the Swiss Finance Institute at EPFL.

== Research ==
Filipović's research focuses on quantitative finance by drawing in an interdisciplinary manner on fields such as quantitative finance, quantitative risk management, and machine learning in finance. It aims at both the advancement of theoretical understanding of financial engineering, and its implementation in the financial industry and governmental policies. His research interests encompass polynomial processes and applications in finance, systemic risk in financial networks, Interest rates, credit risk, stochastic volatility, Stochastic processes, quantitative risk management and regulation, and machine learning in finance.

He also teaches a MOOC on "Interest Rate Models" on Coursera.

== Distinctions ==
Filipović is the 2016 recipient of the Louis Bachelier Prize awarded by the London Mathematical Society, the Natixis Foundation for Quantitative Research and the Société de Mathématiques Appliquées et Industrielles.

He is a member and former president (2016–2017) of the Bachelier finance society.

== Selected works ==
- Duffie, D.; Filipović, D.; Schachermayer, W. (1 August 2003). "Affine processes and applications in finance". The Annals of Applied Probability. 13 (3). doi:10.1214/aoap/1060202833. ISSN 1050-5164. S2CID 6340845.
- Cheridito, Patrick; Filipović, Damir; Yor, Marc (1 August 2005). "Equivalent and absolutely continuous measure changes for jump-diffusion processes". The Annals of Applied Probability. 15 (3). arXiv:math/0508450. doi:10.1214/105051605000000197. ISSN 1050-5164. S2CID 2504454.
- Cheridito, Patrick; Filipović, Damir; Kimmel, Robert L. (January 2007). "Market price of risk specifications for affine models: Theory and evidence☆". Journal of Financial Economics. 83 (1): 123–170. doi:10.1016/j.jfineco.2005.09.008. ISSN 0304-405X.
- Filipovic, Damir (2009). Term-Structure Models. doi:10.1007/978-3-540-68015-4. ISBN 978-3-540-09726-6.
- Filipović, Damir; Overbeck, Ludger; Schmidt, Thorsten (22 September 2010). "Dynamic Cdo Term Structure Modeling". Mathematical Finance. 21 (1): 53–71. doi:10.1111/j.1467-9965.2010.00421.x. ISSN 0960-1627. S2CID 14323028.
- Cuchiero, Christa; Filipović, Damir; Mayerhofer, Eberhard; Teichmann, Josef (1 April 2011). "Affine processes on positive semidefinite matrices". The Annals of Applied Probability. 21 (2). arXiv:0910.0137. doi:10.1214/10-aap710. ISSN 1050-5164. S2CID 15944588.
- Filipović, Damir; Trolle, Anders B. (September 2013). "The term structure of interbank risk". Journal of Financial Economics. 109 (3): 707–733. doi:10.1016/j.jfineco.2013.03.014. ISSN 0304-405X.
- Filipović, Damir; Mayerhofer, Eberhard; Schneider, Paul (October 2013). "Density approximations for multivariate affine jump-diffusion processes". Journal of Econometrics. 176 (2): 93–111. arXiv:1104.5326. doi:10.1016/j.jeconom.2012.12.003. ISSN 0304-4076. S2CID 122805766.
- Filipović, Damir; Kremslehner, Robert; Muermann, Alexander (16 January 2014). "Optimal Investment and Premium Policies Under Risk Shifting and Solvency Regulation". Journal of Risk and Insurance. 82 (2): 261–288. arXiv:1103.1729. doi:10.1111/jori.12021. ISSN 0022-4367. S2CID 340316.
- Cambou, Mathieu; Filipović, Damir (19 June 2015). "Model Uncertainty and Scenario Aggregation". Mathematical Finance. 27 (2): 534–567. doi:10.1111/mafi.12097. ISSN 0960-1627. S2CID 157683249.
- Filipović, Damir; Gourier, Elise; Mancini, Loriano (January 2016). "Quadratic variance swap models". Journal of Financial Economics. 119 (1): 44–68. doi:10.1016/j.jfineco.2015.08.015. ISSN 0304-405X.
- FILIPOVIĆ, DAMIR; LARSSON, MARTIN; TROLLE, ANDERS B. (21 March 2017). "Linear-Rational Term Structure Models". The Journal of Finance. 72 (2): 655–704. doi:10.1111/jofi.12488. ISSN 0022-1082.
- Cambou, Mathieu; Filipović, Damir (13 November 2017). "Replicating portfolio approach to capital calculation". Finance and Stochastics. 22 (1): 181–203. doi:10.1007/s00780-017-0347-1. ISSN 0949-2984. S2CID 508079.
- Ackerer, Damien; Filipović, Damir; Pulido, Sergio (18 May 2018). "The Jacobi stochastic volatility model". Finance and Stochastics. 22 (3): 667–700. arXiv:1605.07099. doi:10.1007/s00780-018-0364-8. ISSN 0949-2984. S2CID 49415504.
- Filipović, Damir; Larsson, Martin; Trolle, Anders B. (1 October 2018). "On the relation between linearity-generating processes and linear-rational models". Mathematical Finance. 29 (3): 804–826. arXiv:1806.03153. doi:10.1111/mafi.12198. ISSN 0960-1627. S2CID 158476820.
- Ackerer, Damien; Filipović, Damir (4 October 2019). "Linear credit risk models". Finance and Stochastics. 24 (1): 169–214. arXiv:1605.07419. doi:10.1007/s00780-019-00409-z. ISSN 0949-2984. S2CID 209509242.
- Boudabsa, Lotfi; Filipovic, Damir (2019). "Machine Learning With Kernels for Portfolio Valuation and Risk Management". SSRN Electronic Journal. arXiv:1906.03726. doi:10.2139/ssrn.3401539. ISSN 1556-5068. S2CID 182952325.
- Amini, Hamed; Filipović, Damir; Minca, Andreea (January 2020). "Systemic Risk in Networks with a Central Node". SIAM Journal on Financial Mathematics. 11 (1): 60–98. doi:10.1137/18m1184667. ISSN 1945-497X. S2CID 214014802.
- Fernandez Arjona, Lucio; Filipovic, Damir (2020). "A machine learning approach to portfolio pricing and risk management for high-dimensional problems". SSRN Electronic Journal. arXiv:2004.14149. doi:10.2139/ssrn.3588376. ISSN 1556-5068. S2CID 216641606.
