= List of women logicians =

A logician is a person who studies logic. Some famous women logicians are listed below in English alphabetical transliteration order (by surname).

== A ==
- Alice Ambrose (America, 1906-2001)
- Hajnal Andréka (Hungary)
- Noriko H. Arai (Japan, born 1962)

== B ==
- Ruth Barcan Marcus
- Katalin Bimbó (born 1963)
- Lenore Blum
- Susanne Bobzien (Germany, born 1960)
- Marjorie Lee Browne (America, 1914-1979)
- Marta Bunge (Argentina, 1938-2022)

== C ==
- Zoé Chatzidakis (France, 1955-2025)
- Agata Ciabattoni (Italy)
- Barbara Csima (Canada)

== D ==
- Veronica Dahl (Argentina)
- Maria Luisa Dalla Chiara (Italy, born 1938)
- Valeria de Paiva (Brazil)
- Itala D'Ottaviano (Brazil, born 1944)
- Amina Doumane (Morocco, born 1990)
- Catarina Dutilh Novaes (Brazil)

== E ==
- Dorothy Edgington (England, born 1941)
- Susanna S. Epp (USA, born 1943)

== F ==
- Vera Fischer (mathematician)
- Johanna N. Y. Franklin (American)

== G ==
- Philippa Gardner
- Mai Gehrke (Denmark, born 1964)
- Hilda Geiringer (Austria, 1893-1973)
- Lise Getoor
- Judy Green (mathematician)
- Marcia Groszek
- Dorothy Grover (1936-2017)

== H ==
- Susan Haack (UK, born 1945)
- Olga Hahn-Neurath
- Ellen Hayes
- Janina Hosiasson-Lindenbaum
- Verena Huber-Dyson (1923-2016)

== I ==
- Rosalie Iemhoff

== J ==
- Constance Jones

== K ==
- Lyudmila Keldysh
- Jane Kister
- Martha Kneale
- Maria Kokoszyńska-Lutmanowa
- Marta Kwiatkowska

== L ==
- Christine Ladd-Franklin (US, 1847–1930)
- Susanne Langer
- Jean A. Larson
- Anne M. Leggett

== M ==
- Penelope Maddy (US, born 1950)
- Ruth Manor (Israel and US, 1944–2005)
- Ursula Martin
- Ofra Magidor
- Larisa Maksimova
- María Manzano
- Anca Muscholl

== N ==
- Sara Negri (Italy/Finland, born 1967)
- Emmy Noether (Germany)

== P ==
- Christine Paulin-Mohring (France, born 1962)
- Rózsa Péter (Hungary, 1905–1977)
- Marian Pour-El
- Val Plumwood (Australia)

== R ==
- Rose Rand
- Helena Rasiowa (Poland, 1917–1994)
- Adriane Rini
- Julia Robinson (US, 1919–1985)

== S ==
- Cristina Sernadas
- Sun-Joo Shin
- Alexandra Silva
- Sonja Smets
- Susan Stebbing
- Wanda Szmielew

== T ==
- Mary Tiles

== V ==
- Monica VanDieren (US, born 1974)
- Rineke Verbrugge (Netherlands, born 1965)

== W ==
- Dorothy Maud Wrinch
- Carol Wood

== Y ==
- Sofya Yanovskaya (Russia)
