= Schnass =

Schnass or Schnaas is a surname. Notable people with the surname include:

- Andreas Schnaas (born 1968), German horror film actor and director
- Karin Schnass (born 1980), Austrian mathematician and computer scientist
- Jörg Schnass, actor in 1996 US-French film The Proprietor
