= Tracy Northup =

American physicist

Tracy Eleanor Northup
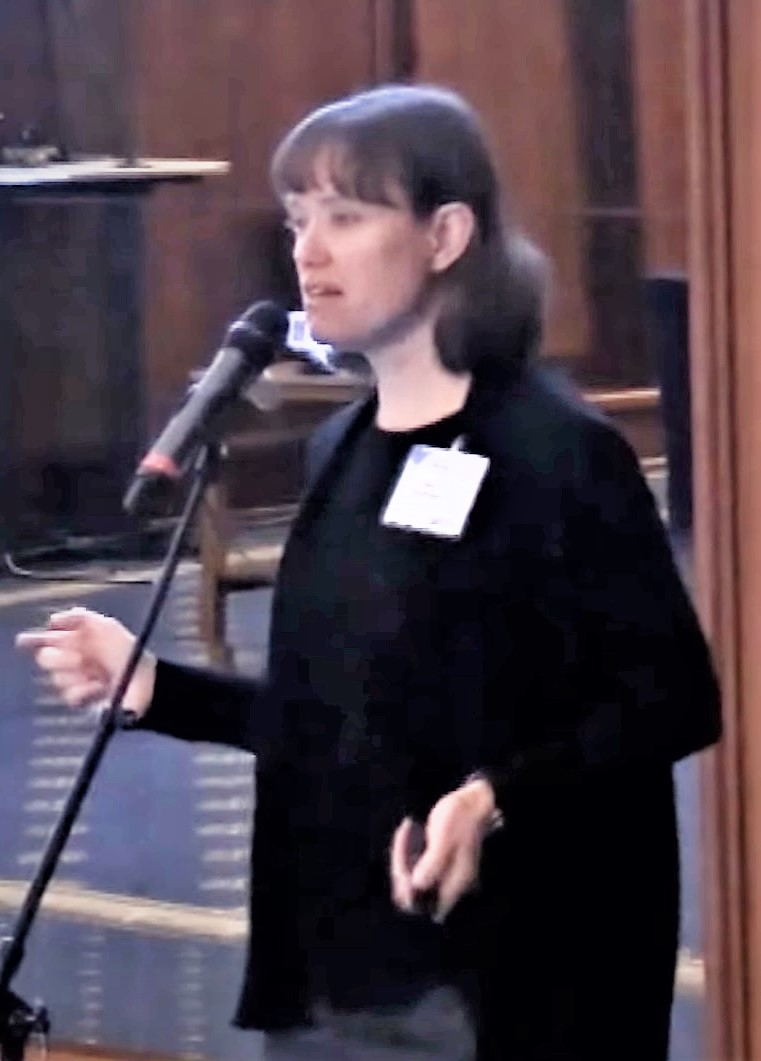
- Northup speaks to the Quantum Internet Proposed Research Group of the Internet Engineering Task Force in 2019.
- Born: 1978 (age 47–48)
- Education: California Institute of Technology; Harvard University
- Scientific career
- Workplaces: University of Innsbruck
- Thesis: Coherent control in cavity QED (2008)

Tracy E. Northup (born 1978) is an American physicist who works at the Institute for Experimental Physics, University of Innsbruck, Austria. Her research considers the development of optical cavities and trapped ions to improve quantum mechanical interactions. She was awarded the 2016 Start-Preis of the Austrian Science Fund.

== Early life and education ==
Northup was born in Newton, Massachusetts. She received an undergraduate degree in physics at Harvard University. She then moved to the West Coast of the United States and earned her doctoral degree at the California Institute of Technology, where she studied coherent control in cavity quantum electrodynamics under the supervision of H. Jeff Kimble. She then joined Rainer Blatt's group at the University of Innsbruck as an international Marie Curie fellow.

== Research and career ==
In 2015, Northup was appointed to the faculty of the University of Innsbruck, where she leads the Quantum Interfaces group. In an effort to achieve highly precise control of macroscopic objects, she has explored ways to achieve the nonlinear coupling through the use of a levitating glass sphere, a trapped ion and an optical resonator. The levitating glass sphere is isolated from its environment and is brought into a superposition of states. Northup was awarded the 2016 Start-Preis of the Austrian Science Fund. She is a member of the Erwin Schrödinger Center for Quantum Science & Technology.

In the field of quantum computing, one of the candidate technologies are ion traps. In ion traps charged particles of ultra cold molecules are trapped in electromagnetic field, and manipulated such that they can carry information. However, the quantum mechanical processes that are exploited by ion traps suffer from errors, such as heating up of the molecules themselves. These errors are understood to originate from the weakly conducting materials such as the oxide layers that form on metal surfaces. Northup has developed approaches to evaluate the impact of dielectric materials on the particles within ion traps. In her ion trap systems, Northup can control the distance between the ions and the dielectric optical components and makes use of the fluctuation-dissipation theorem to calculate the experimental noise. She was involved in the development of the first operating system that allows programming quantum network applications and executing them on quantum network nodes.

Since 2022, Northup is the Deputy Speaker of Austria's Special Research Program BeyondC: Quantum Information Systems Beyond Classical Capabilities, starting in 2019, featuring a cooperation of University of Innsbruck, University of Vienna, Johannes Kepler University Linz, Institute of Science and Technology Austria, and temporarily the German Max Planck Institute of Quantum Optics.

== Selected publications ==
- K. M. Birnbaum; A. Boca; R. Miller; A. D. Boozer; T. E. Northup; H. J. Kimble (1 July 2005). "Photon blockade in an optical cavity with one trapped atom". Nature. 436 (7047): 87–90. arXiv:quant-ph/0507065. doi:10.1038/nature03804. ISSN 1476-4687. PMID 16001065. Wikidata Q33218360.
- R Miller; T E Northup; K M Birnbaum; A Boca; A D Boozer; H J Kimble (25 April 2005). "Trapped atoms in cavity QED: coupling quantized light and matter". Journal of Physics B. 38 (9): S551–S565. doi:10.1088/0953-4075/38/9/007. ISSN 0953-4075. Wikidata Q56882263.
- A. D. Boozer; A. Boca; R. Miller; T. E. Northup; H. J. Kimble (2007), Reversible state transfer between light and a single trapped atom, doi:10.1364/cqo.2007.jwc3, Wikidata Q59714712
