= Start-Preis =

Austrian science and technology award

The Start-Preis was the highest Austrian award for young scientists. It was replaced by the Astra-Preis.

From 1996 to 2024, it was awarded once per year by the Austrian Science Fund on behalf of the Austrian Ministry for Science. It was endowed with up to 1.2 million Euro for a proposed research project for six years.

The recipients are selected by an international jury of experts. The same jury also selects the recipients of the related Wittgenstein-Preis.

== Recipients ==
- 1996: Christian Koeberl, Ferenc Krausz, Ulrich Schmid, Peter Szmolyan, Karl Unterrainer, Harald Weinfurter, Gerhard J. Woeginger, Jakob Woisetschläger
- 1997: Gerhard Holzapfel, Bernhard Palme, Michael Schmid
- 1998: Peter Grabner, Gottfried Kirchengast, Rudolf Valenta, Gerhard Widmer
- 1999: Christoph Marschner, Norbert Mauser, Otmar Scherzer, Thomas Schrefl, Christoph Spötl, Joseph Strauss
- 2000: Thomas Brabec, Susanne Kalss, Dietrich Leibfried, Herbert Strobl, Bernhard Tilg
- 2001: Markus Arndt, Michael Buchmeiser, Wolfgang Drexler, Wilfried Ellmeier, Clemens Sedmak
- 2002: Wolfgang Heiss, Michael Jursa, Georg Schett, Dieter Schmalstieg, Joachim Schöberl
- 2003: Georg Kresse, Hanns-Christoph Nägerl, Andreas Villunger
- 2004: Thomas Bachner, Michael Kunzinger, Vassil Palankovski, Thomas Prohaska, Gerhard Schütz
- 2005: Michael Hintermüller, Matthias Horn, Andrea Lusser, Michael Moser, Norbert Zimmermann
- 2006: Hartmut Häffner, Norbert Polacek, Piet Schmidt, Josef Teichmann, Gerald Teschl
- 2007: Kathrin Breuker, Thomas Bugnyar, Otfried Gühne, Bernhard Lamel, Thomas Lörting, Paul Mayrhofer, Sigrid Wadauer, Thomas Wallnig
- 2008: Markus Aspelmeyer, Tom J. Battin, Massimo Fornasier, Daniel Grumiller, Alexander Kendl, Karel Riha, Kristin Tessmar-Raible, Christina Waldsich
- 2009: Francesca Ferlaino, Ilse Fischer, Arthur Kaser, Manuel Kauers, Thorsten Schumm, David Teis
- 2010: Julius Brennecke, Barbara Horejs, Barbara Kraus, Melanie Malzahn, Florian Schreck, Bojan Zagrovic
- 2011: Peter Balazs, Agata Ciabattoni, Sebastian Diehl, Alwin Köhler, Thomas Müller, Peter Rabl, Michael Sixt, Philip Walther
- 2012: Julia Budka, Kaan Boztug, Alexander Dammermann, Jürgen Hauer, Sofia Kantorovich, Michael Kirchler, Franz Schuster
- 2013: Stefan L. Ameres, Notburga Gierlinger, Clemens Heitzinger, Georgios Katsaros, David A. Keays, Ovidiu Paun, Thomas Pock, Paolo Sartori, Stefan Woltran
- 2014: Bettina Bader, Mathias Beiglböck, Karin Schnass, René Thiemann, Sigrid Neuhauser, Alexander Grüneis, Markus Aichhorn, Manuel Schabus
- 2015: Christoph Aistleitner, Ivona Brandić, Marcus Huber, Ben P. Lanyon, Gareth Parkinson, Rupert Seidl, Kristina Stöckl, Caroline Uhler
- 2016: Christopher Campbell, Felix Höflmayer, Nikolai Kiesel, Tracy Northup, Michael Eichmair, Harald Grobner
- 2017: Hannes Fellner, Claudine Kraft, Wolfgang Lechner, Vera Fischer, Miriam Unterlass, Andrea Pauli
- 2018: Emanuela Bianchi, Josef Norbert Füssl, Philipp Haslinger, Oliver Hofmann, Robert R. Junker, Gina Elaine Moseley
- 2019: Moritz Brehm, Christa Cuchiero, Bruno de Nicola, Christoph Gammer, José Luis Romero, Richard Wilhelm
- 2020: Alice Auersperg, Elisa Davoli, Gemma De las Cuevas, Robert Ganian, Julia Lajta-Novak, Aleksandar Matkovic, Birgitta Schultze-Bernhardt
- 2021 Laura Donnay, Julian Leonard, Yash Lodha, Hannes Mikula, Markus Möst, Katharina Theresa Paul
- 2022 William Barton, Elfriede Dall, Sandra Müller, Marcus Ossiander, Stefan Pflügl, Petra Sumasgutner
- 2023 Barbara Bayer, Stephanie J. Ellis, Máté Gerencsér, Richard Küng, Stephan Pühringer, Clemens Sämann, Marcus Sperling, Lukas Thürmer
- 2024 Juan P. Aguilera, Svitlana Antonyuk, Dan Batovici, Uroš Delić, Esther Heid, Senka Holzer, Polina Kameneva, Yurii Malitskyi
