= Louis Bachelier Prize =

- Awarded for: Exceptional contributions to mathematical modelling in finance, insurance, risk management, and scientific computing
- Country: European Union
- Presented by: London Mathematical Society, Natixis Foundation for Quantitative Research, Société de Mathématiques Appliquées et Industrielles
- Reward: €20,000
- First award: 2007
- Website: http://www.academie-sciences.fr/activite/prix/gp_natixis.htm

The Louis Bachelier Prize is a biennial prize in applied mathematics jointly awarded by the London Mathematical Society, the Natixis Foundation for Quantitative Research and the Société de Mathématiques Appliquées et Industrielles (SMAI) in recognition for "exceptional contributions to mathematical modelling in finance, insurance, risk management and/or scientific computing applied to finance and insurance."

The prize is named in honor of French mathematician Louis Bachelier, a pioneer in the field of probability and its use in financial modeling.

== Description ==
The Louis Bachelier Prize was created in 2007 by the Société de Mathématiques Appliquées et Industrielles [Society for Applied and Industrial Mathematics] in collaboration with the Natixis Quantitative Research Foundation and the French Academy of Sciences. The winner receives €20,000, which includes £5,000 specifically designated to organize a scientific workshop in Europe on their area of research. The prize is awarded biennially to a scientist with less than 20 years of postdoctoral experience "for his/her exceptional contribution to mathematical modelling in finance, insurance, risk management and/or scientific computing applied to finance and insurance".

The candidates must be permanent residents of a country of the European Union. From its creation in 2015, the Louis Bachelier Prize was awarded by the French Academy of Sciences. Since 2015, the prize is administered by the London Mathematical Society.

== Winners ==
- 2007: Huyen Pham
- 2010: Rama Cont
- 2012: Nizar Touzi
- 2014: Josef Teichmann
- 2016: Damir Filipović
- 2018: Pauline Barrieu
- 2020: Mathieu Rosenbaum
- 2022: Beatrice Acciaio
- 2024: Peter Tankov
- 2026: Christa Cuchiero

== See also ==
- List of mathematics awards
