= Ivona Brandić =

Austrian informatician

Ivona Brandić (born December 23, 1977) is a Bosnian–Austrian computer scientist known for her research on cloud computing. She is University Professor for High Performance Computing Systems in the Institute of Information Systems Engineering of TU Wien.

== Education and career ==
Brandić was born in Gradačac, Bosnia and Herzegovina, then part of Yugoslavia. She came to Austria as a secondary school student in 1992, not knowing any German, as a refugee from the Bosnian War. She earned a master's degree in business computer science in 2002 from the University of Vienna, and a doctorate in the same subject in 2007 from TU Wien. She completed her habilitation in applied computer science at TU Wien in 2013.

She was an untenured assistant professor in the Institute for Scientific Computing at the University of Vienna from 2002 to 2007, and in the faculty for informatics of TU Wien from 2007 to 2014, with a year on leave as a postdoctoral researcher at the University of Melbourne in 2008. In 2014 she obtained a tenure track position at TU Wien.

== Recognition ==
Brandić was the 2011 winner of the MiA award in science and research, an Austrian award for distinguished contributions by people with international backgrounds. She won the Start-Preis of the Austrian Science Fund in 2015. In 2016 she joined the Young Academy of the Austrian Academy of Sciences.

== Selected publications ==
- Buyya, Rajkumar; Yeo, Chee Shin; Venugopal, Srikumar; Broberg, James; Brandic, Ivona (2009), "Cloud computing and emerging IT platforms: Vision, hype, and reality for delivering computing as the 5th utility", Future Generation Comp. Syst., 25 (6): 599–616, doi:10.1016/j.future.2008.12.001
- Villari, Massimo; Brandić, Ivona; Tusa, Francesco (2012), Achieving Federated and Self-Manageable Cloud Infrastructures: Theory and Practice, IGI Global
