= Josef Teichmann =

Austrian mathematician

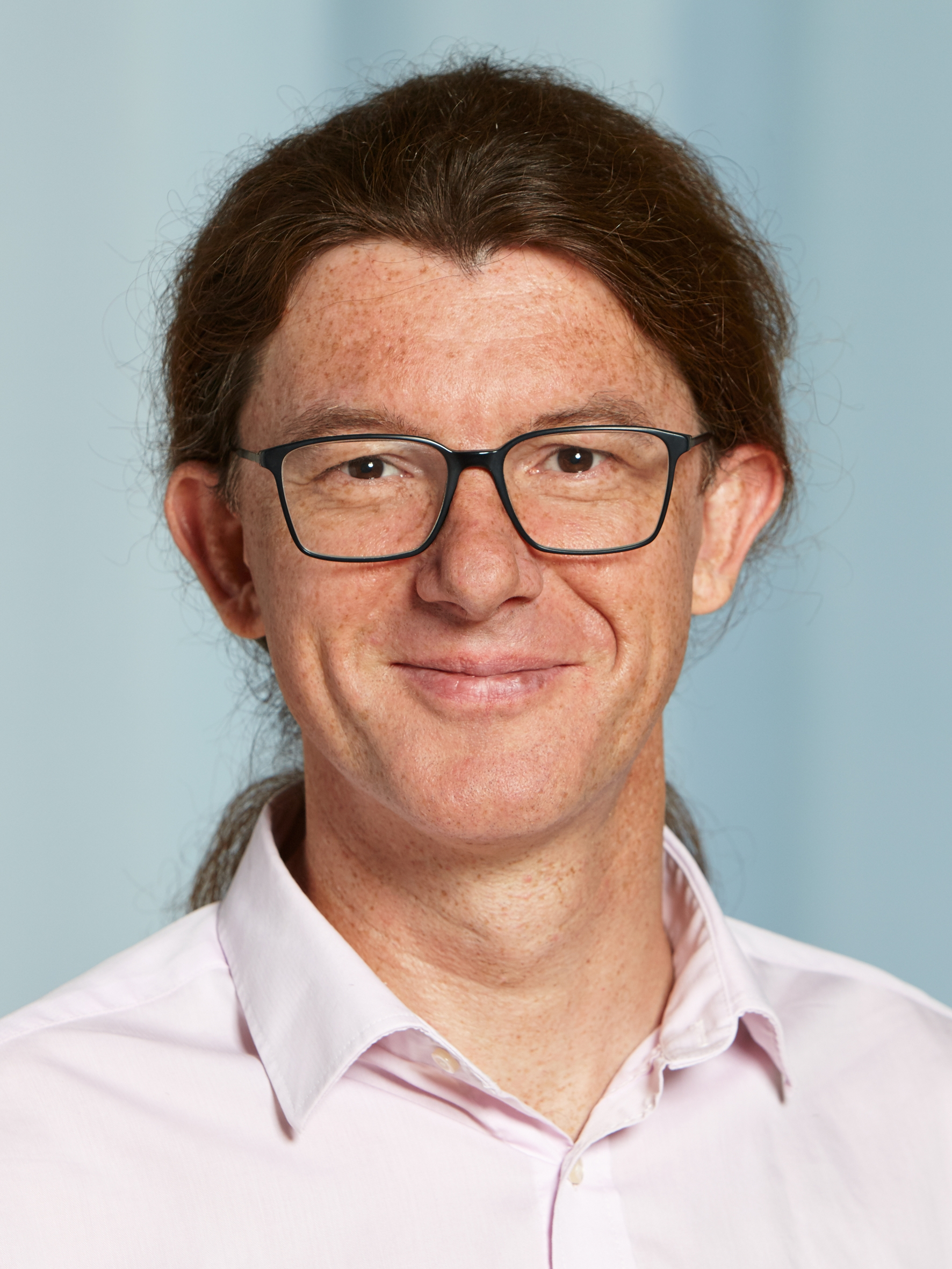
Josef Teichmann, 2019

Josef Teichmann (* 27 August 1972 in Lienz) is an Austrian mathematician and professor at ETH Zürich working on mathematical finance, stochastic analysis and machine learning.

After studying mathematics at the University of Graz, he pursued his PhD at the University of Vienna. The title of his dissertation in 1999 under the supervision of Peter W. Michor was "The Theory of Infinite-Dimensional Lie Groups from the Point of View of Functional Analysis".

After working at the Vienna University of Technology, he obtained the Habilitation there in 2002. Since June 2009 he has been a professor at the Department of Mathematics at ETH Zürich. Since August 2023 he has been chair of the Department of Mathematics at ETH Zürich.

In 2005 he was awarded the Prize of the Austrian Mathematical Society and in 2006 the Start-Preis of the FWF.

In 2014 he was awarded the Louis Bachelier Prize by the French Academy of Sciences.
