= Thomas Schrefl =

Austrian academic

Thomas Schrefl (born 26 March 1965 in Sankt Pölten) is an Austrian physicist. He is currently Head of the Center for Modelling and Simulation at the Danube University Krems. He is also Head of the Christian Doppler Research Laboratory for Magnet Design in collaboration with Toyota. Previously he was Professor of Communications & Simulation Engineering at the St. Pölten University of Applied Sciences. Between 2004 and 2008 he was Professor of Functional Materials at the University of Sheffield. From 2000 to 2006, he led the micromagnetism group at the Vienna University of Technology. In 2005, Dr. Schrefl delivered the Wohlfarth memorial lecture. His research interests include micromagnetic simulations, intelligent materials such as nano-sensors, high frequency oscillators, and atomic trap devices for medical applications.

Schrefl has co-authored more than 140 refereed scientific papers.

== Awards ==
- 1999: START-Prize, Austrian Science Fund
