= Harald Grobner =

Austrian mathematician (born 1980)

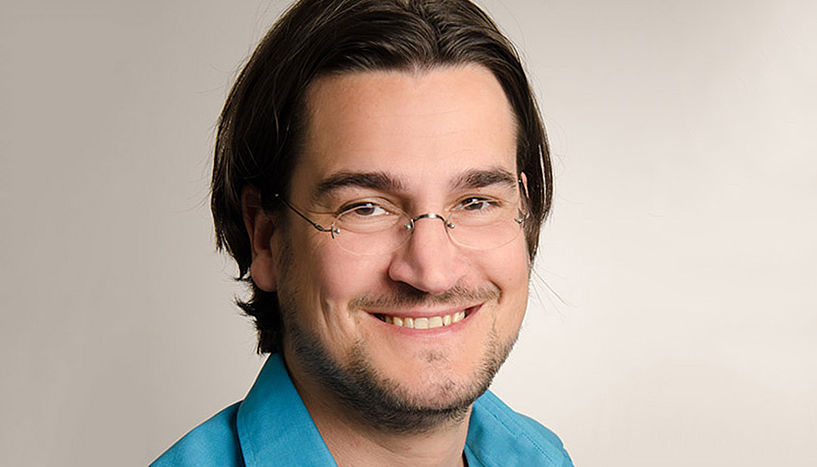
- Harald Grobner in June 2016
- Born: 4 December 1980 (age 45)
- Education: University of Vienna; Université Paris VI
- Awards: Edmund and Rosa Hlawka Preis (2024); Start-Preis (2016)
- Scientific career
- Fields: Mathematics
- Workplaces: University of Vienna
- Thesis: On the Cohomology of Arithmetic Subgroups of Sp(2,2) and Its Maximal Levi Subgroups (2007)
- Doctoral advisor: Joachim Schwermer

Harald Grobner (born 4 December 1980 in Neunkirchen, Austria) is an Austrian mathematician at the Faculty of Mathematics, University of Vienna. His research focuses on questions of algebra and number theory within the Langlands program.

== Career and research ==
Grobner studied mathematics, philosophy and classical philology at the University of Vienna, where he graduated in 2005. From 2005 to 2007 he studied for his doctorate in mathematics at the Université Paris VI and the University of Vienna, with Joachim Schwermer as his supervisor.

Grobner undertook research at the Erwin Schrödinger Institute for Mathematical Physics in Vienna and the Max Planck Institute for Mathematics in Bonn and the Faculty for Mathematics at the University of Vienna, before receiving the Schrödinger Grant of the FWF. From 2010 until 2013 he was a guest researcher at the Oklahoma State University, the Max Planck Institute for Mathematics in Bonn and the Institut mathématiques de Jussieu in Paris. He was habilitated by the University of Vienna for his research on automorphic cohomology and the rationality of special L-values in 2014.

In August 2016, Grobner became a permanent member of staff at the Faculty of Mathematics of the University of Vienna. From October 2016 to October 2022 he led the international research programme "Special L-values and p-adic L-functions" and, from 2020 to 2023, the additional research project "Automorphic models and L-values for global algebras", both funded by the Austrian Science Fund. At the end of 2023, he was awarded another four-year research project, “New aspects of automorphic and smooth-automorphic forms,” by the Austrian Science Fund.

Grobner's book "Smooth-automorphic forms and smooth-automorphic representations" was published in the summer of 2023. In it, the theory of "smooth-automorphic" forms and their representations are treated structurally and conceptually for the first time in book form.

Since fall 2018, Grobner has also been one of the organisers of the research seminar "Algebra and Number Theory" (formerly called "Number Theory Seminar") at the University of Vienna.

== Personal life ==
Harald Grobner lives in Vienna and is father to a son and a daughter.

== Awards ==
- 2008: Promotio sub auspiciis praesidentis rei publicae by the Austrian president, Heinz Fischer
- 2008: "Würdigungspreis" by the Austrian Ministry for Science and Research
- 2016: START-Preis by the FWF.
- 2024: Edmund and Rosa Hlawka Award for Mathematics by the Austrian Academy of Sciences
