= Michael Kirchler =

Austrian behavioral economist (born 1977

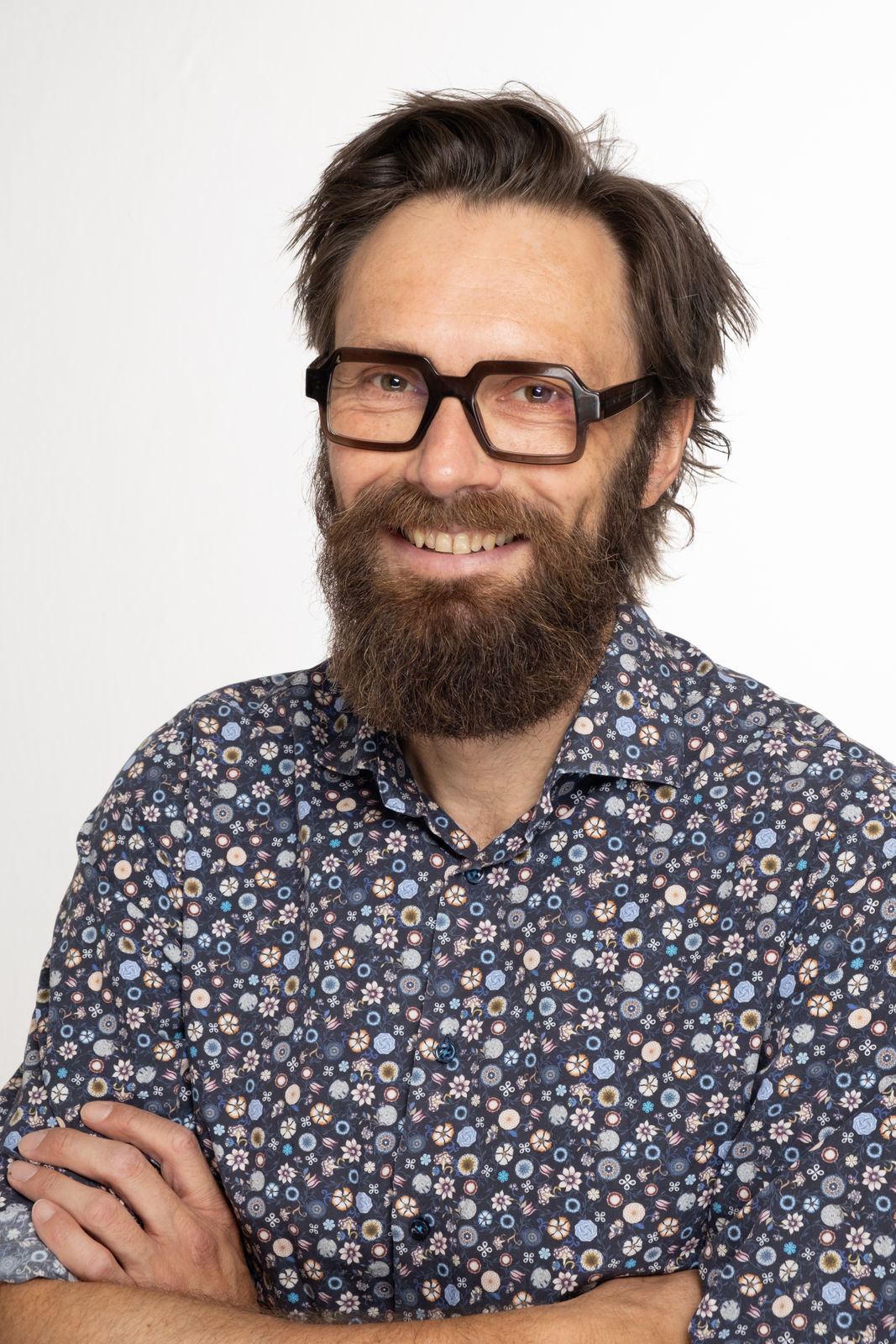
- Kirchler in 2026
- Born: 1977 (age 48–49); Hall in Tirol, Austria

Academic background
- Education: University of Innsbruck

Academic work
- Discipline: Behavioral economics
- Institutions: University of Innsbruck
- Awards: Start-Preis (2012)
- Website: Information at IDEAS / RePEc

Michael Kirchler (born 1977) is an Austrian professor of business administration specializing in finance. He works in the fields of behavioral economics and metascience.

== Biography ==
Kirchler studied business administration at the University of Innsbruck and earned his PhD in social and economic sciences in 2006. During this time, he joined as a research assistant the Department of Banking and Finance, where he became an assistant professor in 2010 and, after completing his habilitation in business administration in 2011, an associate professor. In 2013, he was appointed professor of business administration with a focus on finance. From 2009 to 2013, he was also a visiting professor at the Center for Finance at the University of Gothenburg in Sweden. He was the first economist to receive the Start Prize, Austria’s highest honor for early-career researchers.

Michael Kirchler won multiple regional championships in cross-country skiing and placed third in the sprint event at the Austrian Cross-Country Skiing Championships in 2009. He now trains young athletes. Kirchler is married and has two children.

== Research ==
Kirchler's research focuses on experimental and behavioral economics, studying behavior in economic and financial decision-making. His research is greatly influenced by the work of Vernon L. Smith and ranges from attitudes toward competition and behavior in the financial sector, sports, and everyday life, to the causes of and barriers to speculative bubbles in financial markets, and the influence of competition on moral behavior. For his studies, he uses laboratory and field experiments with a variety of participants, ranging from the general population on different continents to professional groups such as medical staff and financial actors.

Since 2014, he has also been active in the emerging field of metascience, focusing primarily on replication studies as well as studies in which a large number of researchers work on the same research question. He also repeats experiments with several times the original number of participants to verify study results.

Examples of his studies include research on the influence of competition on moral behavior, on improving services in the financial sector through the use of nudges that draw on the Hippocratic Oath, on whether financial professionals drive speculative bubbles in financial markets, and on the relationship between rankings and risk-taking behavior in the financial industry.

He also studies climate change mitigation and carbon taxes from a behavioral science perspective and is a co-author of the Second Austrian Assessment Report on Climate Change.

In class, Kirchler explores the economic impact of cognitive biases such as loss aversion, the tendency toward social comparison, the anchoring effect, and the overestimation of low probabilities. He uses experiments and their results to introduce the topics to his students. They have voted him Professor of the Year multiple times.

From 2017 to 2026, Kirchler led the FWF Special Research Area Credence Goods, Incentives and Behavior, which studied the determinants of individual behavior and market efficiency in credence goods markets.

He heads the Innsbruck Decision Sciences research center at the University of Innsbruck and was Associate Editor of the Journal of Economic Psychology as well as Co-Organizer of the Experimental Finance Conference. He is also Co-Founder, board member and former president of the Society for Experimental Finance.

== Awards ==
- 2003: Science Award of the Tyrolean Chamber of Commerce
- 2006: Theodor Körner Prize
- 2012: Start-Preis
- 2013: Award of the Principality of Liechtenstein
- 2014: Research Award from the Foundation Südtiroler Sparkasse
- 2016: Pater Johannes Schasching SJ-Award
