= Rama Cont =

Iranian mathematician (born 1972)

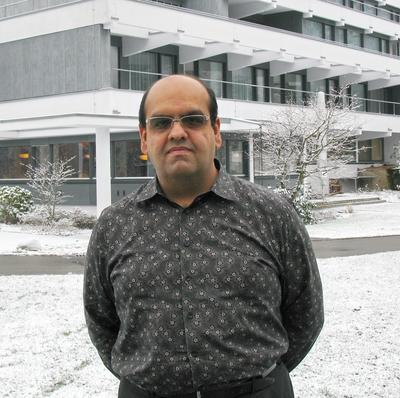
- Cont at Oberwolfach in 2012
- Born: Rama Cont; 30 June 1972 (age 54); Tehran, Iran
- Education: École Polytechnique
- Known for: Systemic risk modelling, Functional Ito calculus, Pathwise Ito calculus, Model risk, Liquidity at risk
- Awards: Louis Bachelier Prize (2010); Royal Society Award for Excellence in Interdisciplinary Research(2017); SIAM Fellow (2017)
- Scientific career
- Fields: Probability; Mathematical Finance
- Workplaces: University of Oxford; Imperial College London; Sorbonne University; Columbia University; École Polytechnique
- Thesis: Des marches aléatoires aux marchés aléatoires. Modélisation statistique des marchés financiers: études empiriques et approches théoriques. (1998)
- Doctoral advisor: Jean-Philippe Bouchaud
- Website: people.maths.ox.ac.uk/rama.cont/

Rama Cont is the Statutory Professor of Mathematical Finance at the University of Oxford. He is known for contributions to probability theory, stochastic analysis and mathematical modelling in finance, in particular for his work on pathwise methods in stochastic analysis and mathematical models of systemic risk. He was awarded the Louis Bachelier Prize by the French Academy of Sciences in 2010.

== Biography ==
Born in Tehran (Iran), Cont obtained his undergraduate degree from Ecole Polytechnique (France), a master's degree in theoretical physics from Ecole Normale Superieure and a degree in Chinese Language from Institut national des langues et civilisations orientales. His doctoral thesis focused on the application of Lévy processes in financial modelling.

== Career and achievements ==
Cont started his career as a CNRS researcher in applied mathematics at Ecole Polytechnique (France) in 1998 and held academic positions at Ecole Polytechnique, and Columbia University. He was appointed 'Directeur de Recherche CNRS' (CNRS Senior Research Scientist) in 2008 and was chair of mathematical finance at Imperial College London from 2012 to 2018. He was elected Statutory Professor in Mathematical Finance at the Oxford Mathematical Institute and professorial fellow of St Hugh's College, Oxford in 2018.

Cont's research focuses on probability theory, stochastic analysis and mathematical modelling in finance. His mathematical work focuses on pathwise methods in stochastic analysis and the Functional Ito calculus.

In quantitative finance he is known in particular for his work on models based on jump processes, the stochastic modelling of limit order books as queueing systems , machine learning methods in finance and the mathematical modelling of systemic risk. He was editor in chief of the Encyclopedia of Quantitative Finance.

Cont has served as advisor to central banks and international organizations such as the International Monetary Fund and the Bank for International Settlements on stress testing and systemic risk monitoring. His work on network models, financial stability and central clearing has influenced central banks and regulators . He has given numerous media interviews on issues related to systemic risk and financial regulation.

== Scientific contributions ==
=== Causal functional calculus ===
Cont is known in mathematics for his the "Causal functional calculus", a calculus for non-anticipative, or "causal", functionals on the space of paths. Cont and collaborators built on the seminal work of German mathematician Hans Föllmer and Bruno Dupire to construct a calculus for non-anticipative functionals, which includes as a special case the so-called Ito-Föllmer calculus, a pathwise counterpart of Ito's stochastic calculus. Subsequent work by Cont and Nicolas Perkowski extended the Ito-Föllmer calculus to functions and functionals of more general irregular paths with non-zero p-th order variation.

=== Systemic risk modeling ===
Work by Cont and his collaborators on mathematical modeling of systemic risk and financial stability, in particular on network models of financial contagion and the modeling of indirect contagion via 'fire sales', has influenced academic research and policy in this area.

=== Central clearing ===
Cont's research on central clearing in over-the-counter (OTC) markets has influenced risk management practices of central counterparties and regulatory thinking on central clearing. Cont has argued that central clearing does not eliminate counterparty risk but transforms it into liquidity risk, therefore risk management and stress testing of central counterparties should focus on liquidity risk and liquidity resources, not capital.

=== Risk measurement and Model risk ===
Cont introduced a rigorous approach for the assessment of model risk which has been influential in the design of model risk management frameworks in financial institutions.

Cont, Deguest and Scandolo introduced the concept of 'risk measurement procedure', an empirical counterpart of the notion of risk measure, and defined a robust class of risk measurement procedures known as 'Range Value-at-risk' (RVaR), a robust alternative to Expected shortfall.

Cont, Kotlicki and Valderrama define the concept of Liquidity at risk, as the amount of liquid assets needed by a financial institution to face liquidity outflows in this scenario.

== Awards and honours ==
Cont was awarded the Louis Bachelier Prize by the French Academy of Sciences in 2010 for his work on mathematical modelling of financial markets. He was elected Fellow of the Society for Industrial and Applied Mathematics (SIAM) in 2017 for "contributions to stochastic analysis and mathematical finance". He received the Award for Excellence in Interdisciplinary Research (APEX) from the Royal Society in 2017 for his research on mathematical modelling of systemic risk. Cont was elected Fellow of the Academy for the Mathematical Sciences in 2026.

== Publications ==
- Ananova, Anna; Cont, Rama (2017). "Pathwise integration with respect to paths of finite quadratic variation". Journal de Mathématiques Pures et Appliquées. 107 (6): 737–757. arXiv:1603.03305. doi:10.1016/j.matpur.2016.10.004. S2CID 16318176.
- Chiu, Henry; Cont, Rama (2022). "Causal Functional Calculus". Transactions of the London Mathematical Society. 9 (1): 237–269. arXiv:1912.07951. doi:10.1112/tlm3.12050. hdl:10044/1/99908. S2CID 16318176.
- Cont, R. (2006). "Model Uncertainty and Its Impact on the Pricing of Derivative Instruments" (PDF). Mathematical Finance. 16 (3): 519–547. doi:10.1111/j.1467-9965.2006.00281.x. S2CID 16075069.
- Cont, Rama; Fournie, David-Antoine (2010). "Change of variable formulas for non-anticipative functional on path space". Journal of Functional Analysis. 259 (4): 1043–1072. arXiv:1004.1380. doi:10.1016/j.jfa.2010.04.017. hdl:10044/1/10539.
- Cont, Rama; Fournie, David-Antoine (2013). "Functional Ito calculus and stochastic integral representation of martingales". The Annals of Probability. 41 (1): 109–133. arXiv:1002.2446. doi:10.1214/11-AOP721. S2CID 8840440.
- Cont, Rama; Moussa, Amal; Santos, Edson Bastos (2013). "Network structure and systemic risk in banking systems". In Fouque, Jean-Pierre; Langsam, Joseph (eds.). Handbook of Systemic Risk (PDF). Cambridge University Press. CiteSeerX 10.1.1.637.587. doi:10.1017/CBO9781139151184.018. ISBN 978-1-107-02343-7. Archived from the original (PDF) on 1 Aug 2013. Alt URL
- Bally, Vlad; Caramellino, Lucia; Cont, Rama (2016). Stochastic integration by parts and Functional Ito calculus. Springer. doi:10.1007/978-3-319-27128-6. ISBN 978-3-319-27128-6.
- Cont, Rama; Deguest, Romain; Giacomo, Giacomo (2010). "Robustness and Sensitivity Analysis of Risk Measurement Procedures" (PDF). Quantitative Finance. 10 (6): 593–606. doi:10.1080/14697681003685597. S2CID 158678050.
- Cont, Rama; De Larrard, Adrien (2013). "Price Dynamics in a Markovian Limit Order Market". SIAM Journal on Financial Mathematics. 4 (1): 1–25. arXiv:1104.4596. doi:10.1137/110856605. S2CID 1238587.
- Cont, Rama; Tankov, Peter (2004). Financial Modelling with Jump Processes. CRC Press. ISBN 978-1-58488-413-2.
- Cont, Rama; Kotlicki, Artur; Valderrama, Laura (2020). "Liquidity at Risk: Joint Stress Testing of Solvency and Liquidity". Journal of Banking and Finance. 118 105871. doi:10.1016/j.jbankfin.2020.105871. hdl:11250/2652653.
- Cont, Rama; Perkowski, Nicolas (2020). "Pathwise integration and change of variable formulas for continuous paths with arbitrary regularity". Transactions of the American Mathematical Society. 6 (5): 161-186. arXiv:1803.09269. doi:10.1090/btran/34.
- Cont, Rama; Stoikov, Sasha; Talreja, Rishi (2010). "A Stochastic Model for Order Book Dynamics". Operations Research. 58 (3): 549–563. doi:10.1287/opre.1090.0780.
