= Modélisation mathématique et analyse numérique =

Modélisation mathématique et analyse numérique (M2AN) is a journal published by EDP Sciences on behalf of the Société de mathématiques appliquées et industrielles (SMAI) in France that focuses on mathematical and computational modeling and numerical analysis.
