= Vera Fischer (mathematician) =

Mathematician

Vera V. Fischer is a mathematician specializing in set theory, mathematical logic, and infinitary combinatorics. She is a privatdozent in the Kurt Gödel Research Center for Mathematical Logic at the University of Vienna.

== Education and career ==
Fischer completed her doctorate in 2008 at York University in Canada. Her dissertation, The Consistency of Arbitrarily Large Spread between the Bounding and the Splitting Numbers, was supervised by Juris Steprāns.

Before joining the Kurt Gödel Research Center, she worked at TU Wien from 2014 to 2015, where she led a project under the Lise Meitner Programme of the Austrian Science Fund.

== Recognition ==
In 2017, Fischer won the Start-Preis of the Austrian Science Fund. In 2018, she won the Prize of the Austrian Mathematical Society.
