= ESAIM: Control, Optimisation and Calculus of Variations =

- Discipline: Mathematics
- Language: English

Publication details
- Publisher: EDP Sciences

Standard abbreviations
- ISO 4: ESAIM Control Optim. Calc. Var.

Indexing
- ISSN: 1292-8119 (print); 1262-3377 (web)

Links
- Journal homepage

ESAIM: Control, Optimisation and Calculus of Variations is a scientific journal in the field of applied mathematics. It is published by EDP Sciences on behalf of Société de Mathématiques Appliquées et Industrielles (SMAI) that specializes in articles on control theory, optimization, optimal control and calculus of variations.
