= Gerhard J. Woeginger =

Austrian mathematician and computer scientist (1964–2022)

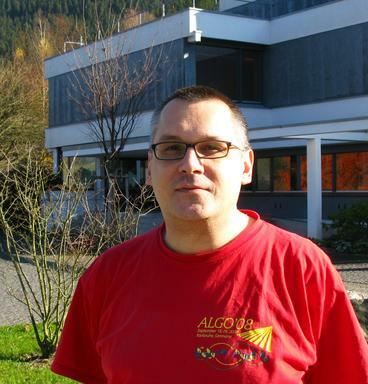
Woeginger at the Combinatorial Optimization Workshop 2011 in Oberwolfach

Gerhard J. Woeginger (31 May 1964 – 1 April 2022) was an Austrian mathematician and computer scientist who worked in Germany as a professor at RWTH Aachen University, where he chaired the algorithms and complexity group in the department of computer science.

== Biography ==
Woeginger was born on 31 May 1964 in Graz, Austria. He obtained a diploma from the Graz University of Technology (TU Graz) in 1987, and completed his Ph.D. at TU Graz 1991 under the supervision of Franz Rendl. He worked on the faculty of TU Graz from 1991 to 2001, where he completed his habilitation in 1995. He then moved to the University of Twente from 2001 to 2004, to TU Eindhoven, from 2004 to 2016, and finally to RWTH Aachen in 2016.

He was program chair of the European Symposium on Algorithms in 1997, of the algorithms track of the International Colloquium on Automata, Languages and Programming in 2003, of the European Conference on Operational Research in 2009, and of several other conferences.

In 1996, Woeginger won the Start-Preis, the highest Austrian award for scientists under the age of 35. He won a Humboldt Research Award in 2011. In 2014, he was elected to the Academia Europaea.

Until September 2016, Woeginger maintained a list of attempts to settle the P versus NP problem on his website. As of its last update, the list tallied 116 attempts dating back to 1986 to settle the question in various ways.

Woeginger died on 1 April 2022, at the age of 57.
