= Sylvie Méléard =

French mathematician

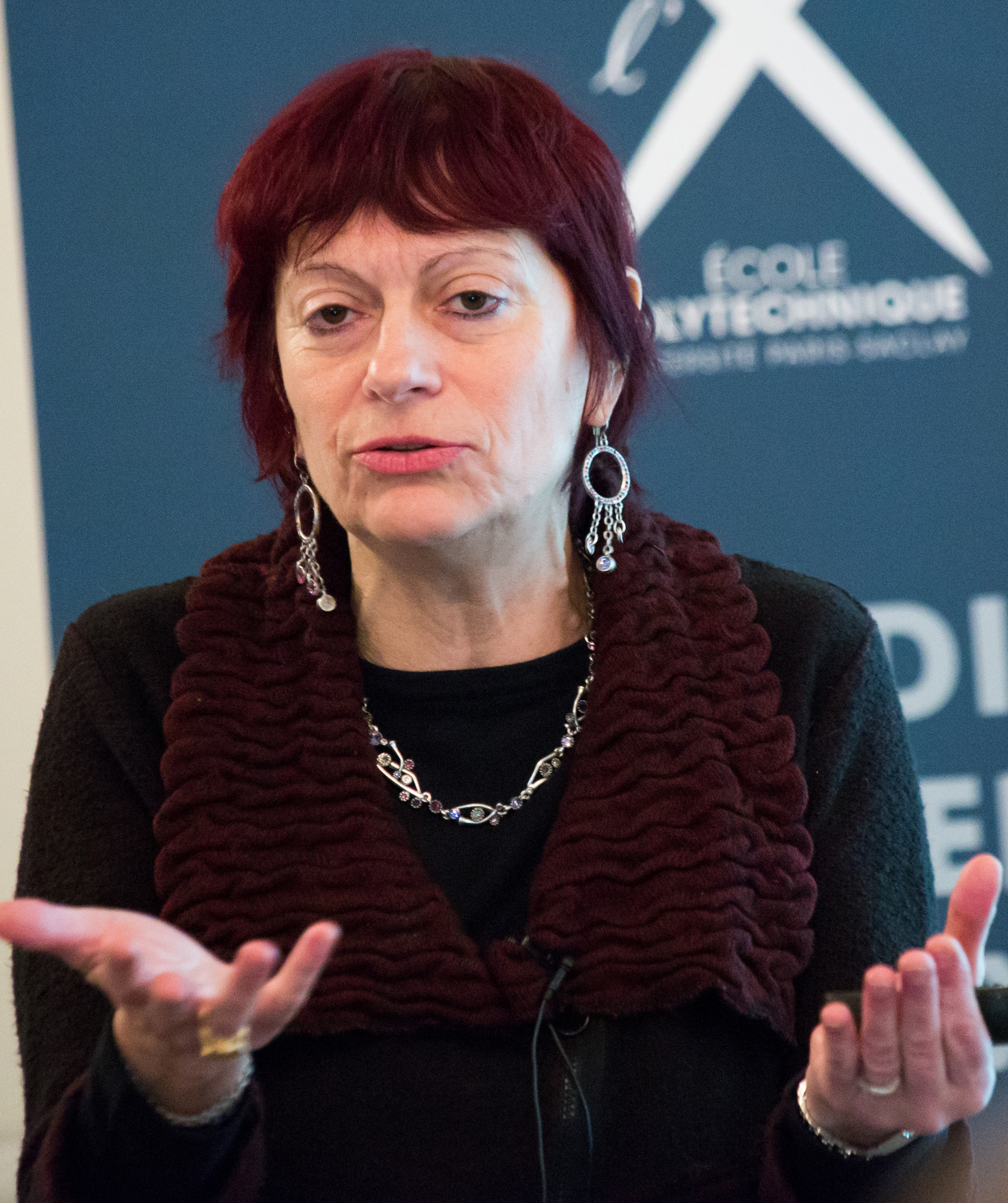
- Méléard, 2016
- Education: Pierre and Marie Curie University
- Scientific career
- Fields: Mathematics
- Workplaces: École Polytechnique; Paris Nanterre University
- Doctoral advisor: Nicole El Karoui

Sylvie Méléard is a French mathematician specializing in probability theory, stochastic processes, particle systems, and stochastic differential equations. She is editor-in-chief of Stochastic Processes and Their Applications.

== Education and career ==
Méléard grew up in Picardy as the daughter of two high school biology teachers, and was already aiming for a career as a mathematician by the time she was ten years old. She studied at the Lycée Janson-de-Sailly and, from 1977 to 1981, at the École normale supérieure de Fontenay-aux-Roses, where she became known for knitting during lectures. After earning her agrégation in 1981, she completed her doctorate in 1984 at Pierre and Marie Curie University under the supervision of Nicole El Karoui.

She took a position at the University of Le Mans, and then moved to Pierre and Marie Curie University as maître de conférences in 1989. At Pierre and Marie Curie, she earned her habilitation in 1991. She became a professor at Paris Nanterre University in 1992, and moved again to the École Polytechnique in 2006.

== Contributions ==
With Vincent Bansaye, Méléard is the author of Stochastic Models for Structured Populations: Scaling Limits and Long Time Behavior (Springer, 2015). She is also the author of Modèles aléatoires en ecologie et evolution [Random models in ecology and evolution] (Springer, 2016).

As of 2018, she is the editor-in-chief of the journal Stochastic Processes and Their Applications and, as editor, an executive member in the Bernoulli Society.

== Recognition ==
In September 2018, a conference on population dynamics was held at the Institut Henri Poincaré in honor of Méléard's 60th birthday. She was elected to the Academia Europaea in 2021.
