= Sylvie Roelly =

French mathematician

Sylvie Roelly (born 1960) is a French mathematician specializing in probability theory, including the study of particle systems, Gibbs measure, diffusion, and branching processes. She is a professor of mathematics in the Institute of Mathematics at the University of Potsdam in Germany.

== Education and career ==
Roelly was born in 1960 in Paris, and studied mathematics from 1979 to 1984 at the École normale supérieure de jeunes filles in Paris. She earned a diploma in mathematics in 1980 through the Paris Diderot University, and an agrégation in 1982. She completed her Ph.D. in 1984 through Pierre and Marie Curie University, with the dissertation Processus de diffusion à valeurs mesures multiplicatifs supervised by Nicole El Karoui. She also earned her habilitation in 1991 through Pierre and Marie Curie University.

After a year of lecturing at the École normale supérieure, she became a researcher for the French National Centre for Scientific Research (CNRS) in 1985. She came to Germany as a Humboldt Fellow at Bielefeld University from 1990 to 1994, and was a researcher at the Weierstrass Institute in Berlin from 2001 to 2003, before taking her professorship at Potsdam in 2003.

At Potsdam, she was head of the Institute of Mathematics from 2011 to 2015, and vice-dean of the Faculty of Science from 2016 to 2019. Along with her research interest in probability, she has organized in Potsdam several events concerning the history of Jewish mathematicians.

== Recognition ==
In 2007, Roelly and Michèle Thieullen won the Itô Prize of the Bernoulli Society for their work on Brownian diffusion. She was named mathematician of the month for April 2015 by the German Mathematical Society.
