= Karin Schnass =

Austrian mathematician and computer scientist

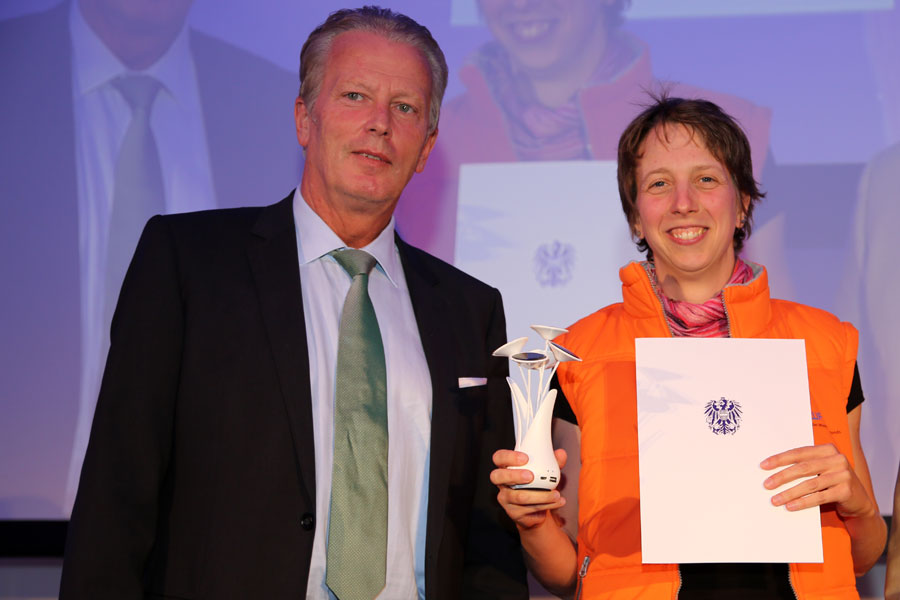
- Schnass (on right) receiving the Start-Preis in June 2014. On the left is Reinhold Mitterlehner, Austrian Minister of Economy.
- Born: 1980 (age 45–46); Klosterneuburg, Austria
- Education: University of Vienna, École Polytechnique Fédérale de Lausanne
- Occupations: mathematician, computer scientist
- Employer: professor of mathematics at the University of Innsbruck
- Known for: sparse dictionary learning
- Awards: Start-Preis at Austrian Science Fund (2014)

Karin Schnass (born 1980) is an Austrian mathematician and computer scientist known for her research on sparse dictionary learning. She is a professor of mathematics at the University of Innsbruck.

== Education and career ==
Schnass was born in Klosterneuburg. She earned a master's degree in mathematics at the University of Vienna in 2004, with a thesis surveying Gabor multipliers supervised by Hans Georg Feichtinger. She completed her Ph.D. in communication and information sciences at the École Polytechnique Fédérale de Lausanne in 2009. Her dissertation was Sparsity & Dictionaries – Algorithms & Design, and her doctoral advisor was Pierre Vandergheynst.

After postdoctoral research at the Johann Radon Institute for Computational and Applied Mathematics of the Austrian Academy of Sciences in Linz (chosen over Stanford University to stay close to her family) and as an Erwin Schrödinger Research Fellow at the University of Sassari and University of Innsbruck, she joined the Innsbruck Department of Mathematics as an assistant professor in 2016.

== Recognition ==
Schnass was a winner of the Start-Preis of the Austrian Science Fund in 2014. She was a keynote speaker at iTWIST 2016.
