= Margin at risk =

Measure estimating potential margin shortfalls under adverse market moves

The Margin-at-Risk (MaR) is a quantity used to manage short-term liquidity risks due to variation of margin requirements, i.e. it is a financial risk occurring when trading commodities. It is similar to the Value-at-Risk (VaR), but instead of simulating EBIT it returns a quantile of the (expected) cash flow distribution.

To do so, MaR requires (1) a currency, (2) a confidence level (e.g. 90%) and (3) a holding period (e.g. 3 days). The idea is that a given portfolio loss will be compensated by a margin call by the same amount. The MaR quantifies the "worst case" margin-call and is only driven by market prices.

== Liquidity management and stress testing ==
Margin-at-Risk is used as part of liquidity risk management because margin calls can create short-term funding needs during periods of market stress. Derivatives counterparties, clearing members, and other market participants are expected to maintain sufficient liquidity to meet margin and collateral calls on time, including when market volatility increases margin requirements.

The measure is related to stress testing because it estimates the potential cash outflow from margin calls over a defined holding period and confidence level. Liquidity risk frameworks for margin and collateral calls commonly include risk tolerance, liquidity buffers, and stress scenarios covering the duration and scale of margin-related liquidity stress that a market participant is willing to withstand.

== See also ==
- Liquidity at risk – Measure of potential liquidity shortfall in a financial portfolio
- Value at risk – Estimated potential loss for an investment under a given set of conditions
- Profit at risk – Measure estimating the potential decline in profit under adverse market conditions
- Earnings at risk – Estimate of the potential impact of market movements on a firm's earnings
- Cash flow at risk – Estimate of the potential impact of market movements on a firm's earnings
