= Agata Ciabattoni =

Italian mathematician

Agata Ciabattoni is an Italian mathematical logician specializing in non-classical logic. She is a full professor at the Institute of Logic and Computation of the Faculty of Informatics at the Vienna University of Technology (TU Wien), and a co-chair of the Vienna Center for Logic and Algorithms of TU Wien (VCLA).

== Education and career ==
Ciabattoni is originally from Ripatransone. She studied computer science at the University of Bologna, and completed her Ph.D. in 2000 at the University of Milan. Her dissertation, Proof-theory in many-valued logics, was supervised by Daniele Mundici.

She moved to Vienna in 2000 with the support of an EU Marie Curie Fellowship, and In 2007, she earned her habilitation at TU Wien. She remains affiliated with TU Wien, as a professor in the faculty of informatics. She also serves as the Collegium Logicum lecture series chair for the Kurt Gödel Society.

== Contributions ==
One of Ciabattoni's projects at TU Wien involves using mathematical logic to formalize the ethical reasoning in the Vedas, a body of Indian sacred texts.

== Recognition ==
In 2011, Ciabattoni won the Start-Preis of the Austrian Science Fund, the only woman to win the prize that year.
