= Pauline Barrieu =

French financial statistician, probability theorist

Pauline Barrieu is a French financial statistician, probability theorist, and expert on financial risk assessment, risk transfer, and uncertainty quantification. She is a professor of statistics in the London School of Economics.

== Education and career ==
Barrieu earned an MBA at the ESSEC Business School in 1997, a DEA in probability theory at Pierre and Marie Curie University in 1998, and a PhD in 2002, simultaneously in finance at HEC Paris and in applied mathematics at Pierre and Marie Curie University, supervised by Marc Chesney at HEC Paris and by Nicole El Karoui at Pierre and Marie Curie University.

She has been a member of the statistics department at the London School of Economics since 2002, becoming a professor in 2012 and serving as head of the department for 2016–2019.

== Recognition ==
In 2003, Barrieu was one of the winners of the Prix de l'Actuariat, an annual international award for top doctoral dissertations in actuarial science.

She was the 2018 winner of the Louis Bachelier Prize. The award cited her work on "how we address model risk, uncertainty, and risk sharing under uncertainty".
