= Markus Müller (physician) =

Austrian pharmacologist and Rector of the Medical University of Vienna

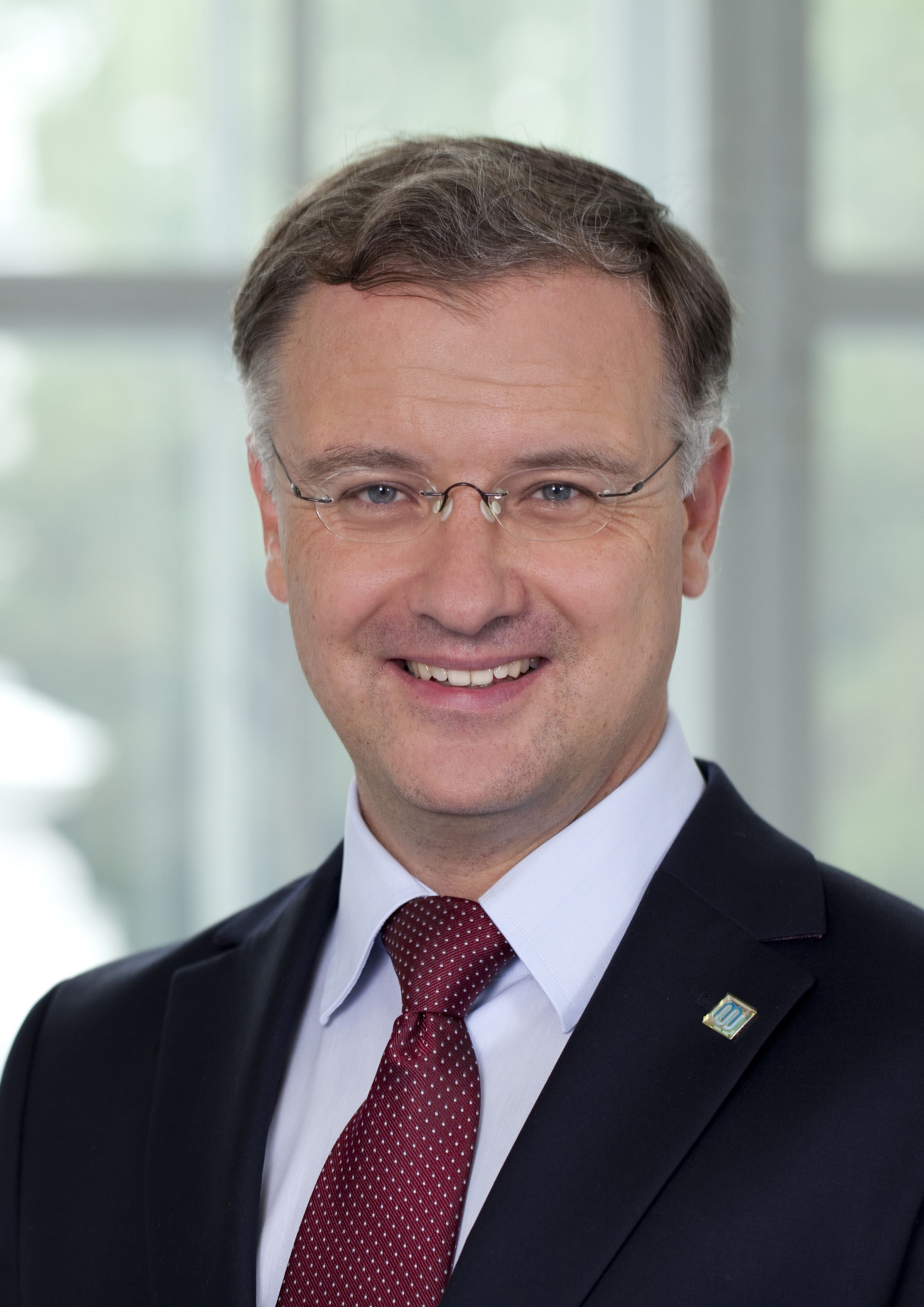

Rector of the Medical University of Vienna
- Incumbent
- Assumed office Oct 1, 2015
- Preceded by: Wolfgang Schütz

Personal details
- Born: 23 August 1967 (age 59) Klagenfurt
- Education: University of Vienna
- Website: https://www.meduniwien.ac.at

Markus Müller (born August 23, 1967 in Klagenfurt) is an Austrian pharmacologist. In 2015 he began serving as Rector of the Medical University of Vienna.

== Early life ==
Müller graduated from high school in 1985 at the Theresianum in Vienna and studied medicine at the University of Vienna. He earned his medical doctor in 1993 with sub auspiciis Praesidentis honors.

== Career ==
He specialized in internal medicine at Vienna General Hospital from 1993 to 2000. In 1995, Müller was a visiting researcher at the Laboratory for Diabetes Research in Gothenburg. From 2000 to 2001, he was guest professor at the University of Florida. In 2004, he was appointed full professor and head of the department of clinical pharmacology at the Medical University of Vienna.

Müller has published some 200 research papers, in outlets such as the New England Journal of Medicine.

In 2015 Müller was elected Rector of the Medical University of Vienna. Two years later, he was re-elected for another four-year term from October 2019 to September 2023.

=== Notable publications ===
An historical review symposium was published by the Medical University of Vienna in 2017: "Medical Ethics in the 70 Years after the Nuremberg Code, 1947 to the Present". Müller wrote in his introduction that the Code constitutes one of the most important milestones in the history of medicine, providing for the first time a proper framework for research on human subjects. Sadly, this milestone was not a voluntary, precautionary measure resulting from enlightened humanity, it only came into existence in the aftermath of dreadful Nazi atrocities. Following its conception, the Nuremberg Code bore rich fruit in multiple legal regards, becoming a cornerstone of clinical research and bioethics. For Austrian science in particular, the discourse on Nazi crimes and, thus, the Nuremberg Code became a special warning from history due to the involvement of prominent Austrian physicians in Nazi experiments... For Austrian science in particular, the discourse on Nazi crimes and, thus, the Nuremberg Code became a special warning from history due to the involvement of prominent Austrian physicians in Nazi experiments. In my inauguration speech as the newly elected rector, I drew attention to the fact that I consider the transfer of attitudes to the next generation to be more important for a university than the transfer of mere technical skills."

== Honours ==
Müller was awarded the Tanabe Award 2004 of the American College of Clinical Pharmacology (ACCP) "in acknowledgement of innovations in clinical pharmacology trials". In September 2018, he received the ACCP Honorary Fellowship Award.
