= Liquidity at risk =

Measure of potential liquidity shortfall in a financial portfolio

Liquidity at risk (LaR) is a financial risk measure that estimates the potential net cash outflows an institution may face over a specified time horizon and confidence level. It is designed to quantify the risk that a bank, investment fund, or corporation will be unable to meet its short-term obligations due to unexpected demands on liquidity. The concept is closely related to Value at Risk (VaR), but instead of focusing on market value fluctuations, LaR models the probability distribution of future cash flows, including margin calls, credit drawdowns, and contingent liabilities.

LaR is used in liquidity risk management to assess funding adequacy under normal and stressed conditions, and it has been discussed in both academic research and regulatory contexts as a complement to stress testing and supervisory liquidity ratios such as the Liquidity coverage ratio (LCR) under Basel III. While proponents highlight its ability to provide a probabilistic framework for liquidity planning, critics note that LaR, like VaR, is sensitive to model assumptions and may underestimate extreme events.

== Definition ==
Liquidity at risk (LaR) is a quantitative risk measure that estimates the potential net liquidity shortfall an institution may face over a specified time horizon and confidence level. It extends the logic of value-at-risk to liquidity management by modeling the probability distribution of future cash inflows and outflows, including contingent liabilities such as margin calls, credit line drawdowns, and refinancing needs.

LaR is used to assess funding liquidity risk by quantifying the liquidity resources required under normal and stressed conditions, even if a financial institution remains solvent but cannot meet its obligations when due. Policy and research literature situates LaR within the interaction of market, funding, and central bank liquidity, and describes it as a probabilistic complement to supervisory liquidity ratios.

While LaR is not a regulatory standard, it is discussed as a forward-looking measure that can complement stress testing frameworks and inform the sizing of liquidity buffers and contingency planning.

== Methods and calculations ==
The calculation of liquidity at risk (LaR) follows the logic of value-at-risk (VaR) but applies it to projected cash flows rather than portfolio values. In general terms, LaR seeks to determine the maximum net cash outflow that could occur over a specified horizon, at a given confidence level, based on the probability distribution of expected inflows and outflows.

=== General framework ===
The methodology typically involves:

- Specifying a time horizon (e.g., 10 days, 30 days) consistent with liquidity planning cycles.
- Modelling cash inflows and outflows, including contractual payments, margin calls, credit line drawdowns, and refinancing needs.
- Estimating probability distributions for these flows, often using historical data, stress scenarios, or Monte Carlo simulations.
- Calculating the quantile of the net cash flow distribution corresponding to the chosen confidence level (e.g., 95% or 99%). This quantile represents the LaR figure, i.e., the maximum expected outflow not exceeded with that probability.

=== Basic Equation ===
Liquidity at Risk is typically defined as:

$$\text{LaR} = \text{Expected Cash Outflows} - \text{Expected Cash Inflows} - \text{Liquid Asset Buffer}$$

=== Formal Representation ===
$$\text{LaR}(\alpha, T) = [\text{Cash Outflows}(T) - \text{Cash Inflows}(T) - \text{Available Liquidity}]_\alpha$$

Where:

- $\alpha$ = confidence level (e.g., 95% or 99%)
- $T$ = time horizon (e.g., 1 day, 1 week, 1 month)
- The subscript $\alpha$ indicates the value at the specified percentile

=== Alternative Formulation ===
Some practitioners express LaR as the funding gap:

$$\text{LaR} = \max[0, \text{Required Liquidity} - \text{Available Liquidity}]$$

Where:

- Required Liquidity = stressed cash outflows over horizon $T$
- Available Liquidity = sum of cash + unencumbered liquid assets + available credit lines

=== Probabilistic Version ===
$$\text{LaR}(\alpha, T) = -\Delta\text{Cash}(\alpha, T)$$

Where $\Delta\text{Cash}(\alpha, T)$ represents the $\alpha$-percentile worst-case change in cash position over time horizon $T$.

=== Stress testing approaches ===
LaR is integrated into joint stress-testing frameworks to link solvency shocks to liquidity needs. For example, the IMF uses structural models in which solvency shocks generate endogenous liquidity demands through margin calls and funding withdrawals, allowing LaR to be calculated consistently with capital stress tests.

=== Relationship to Value at Risk ===
LaR is analogous to Value at Risk (VaR), but measures potential liquidity shortfalls rather than portfolio value losses. Like VaR, LaR is calculated at a specific confidence level and time horizon to quantify tail risk in liquidity positions.

LaR is conceptually related to liquidity-adjusted VaR (L-VaR), which incorporates market liquidity effects into VaR calculations. While L-VaR focuses on the cost of liquidating assets under market impact, LaR focuses on funding liquidity, the ability to meet cash outflows when due.

== Criticisms and limitations ==
Liquidity at Risk has been subject to various criticisms, many of which parallel the well-documented critiques of Value at Risk (VaR), from which LaR is conceptually derived.

=== Model risk and distributional assumptions ===
LaR is subject to model risk as it depends on the probability distribution over scenarios. The accuracy of LaR estimates relies heavily on assumptions about future market conditions, the behaviour of counterparties, and the availability of funding sources during stress periods. Critics argue that these assumptions may not hold during actual liquidity crises, when market dynamics can change rapidly and unpredictably.

Financial theorist Nassim Nicholas Taleb, who has been a prominent critic of VaR-based risk measures, has argued that quantitative risk measures relying on probabilistic models are fundamentally flawed when applied to rare, high-impact events. Taleb characterized the assumption of well-defined probability distributions for extreme losses as "charlatanism," arguing that the most severe liquidity crises occur precisely when models break down.

=== Inability to capture tail risk ===
Like VaR, LaR measures a threshold at a given confidence level but does not quantify the magnitude of liquidity shortfalls beyond that threshold. For a fixed confidence level, LaR does not assess the magnitude of loss when a breach occurs and therefore is considered by some to be a questionable metric for risk management. During the financial crisis of 2007–2008, many institutions discovered that their actual liquidity needs during stress far exceeded their LaR estimates, sometimes by orders of magnitude.

=== False sense of security ===
Risk management experts have warned that LaR, like other quantitative risk measures, can create a false sense of security among management and stakeholders. The use of high confidence levels (such as 95% or 99%) may lead decision-makers to underestimate the probability and severity of extreme events. Hedge fund manager David Einhorn famously compared VaR to "an airbag that works all the time, except when you have a car accident," a criticism equally applicable to LaR.

=== Scenario dependency and incomplete coverage ===
LaR is a conditional measure, which depends on the stress scenario considered. The selection of scenarios is inherently subjective and may fail to capture unprecedented events or combinations of market conditions. During the financial crisis, many exposed banks did not have an adequate framework that satisfactorily accounted for the liquidity risks posed by individual products and business lines.

=== Behavioural and systemic factors ===
Liquidity-at-risk models face significant challenges in capturing the behavioural and systemic dynamics that emerge during periods of financial stress. In practice, crises are often marked by a sudden loss of market confidence and the spread of financial contagion, which can trigger coordinated withdrawals of funding by multiple counterparties. These pressures are frequently compounded by fire sale dynamics, where institutions are forced to liquidate assets rapidly, leading to a deterioration of market liquidity. Such processes can generate second-order effects and feedback loops, amplifying the initial shock and making liquidity conditions more fragile.

The Basel Committee on Banking Supervision has observed that, under stress, private market liquidity for certain instruments can evaporate with remarkable speed. Fire sales in particular may generate mark‑to‑market losses that further weaken liquidity positions, encouraging additional asset disposals and contributing to a downward spiral in prices.

=== Static nature ===
LaR typically provides a point-in-time estimate, but liquidity crises are dynamic processes where conditions can deteriorate rapidly. The measure may not adequately capture how quickly available liquidity can be depleted or how market conditions evolve during stress periods.

=== Non-additivity ===
LaR, like VaR, is not subadditive, meaning the LaR of a combined portfolio may be greater than the sum of the LaRs of its individual components due to correlation effects. This property complicates risk aggregation across different business units or legal entities.

=== Regulatory response ===
In response to these limitations, regulators have emphasised that LaR and similar quantitative metrics should be complemented with comprehensive stress testing, qualitative assessments, and robust contingency funding plans. The Basel Committee has recognised that inaccurate and ineffective management of liquidity risk was a key characteristic of the financial crisis. The Basel III framework introduced additional liquidity requirements, including the liquidity coverage ratio and Net Stable Funding Ratio, which complement risk measures like LaR with more prescriptive regulatory standards.

== See also ==
- Margin at risk – Measure estimating potential margin shortfalls under adverse market moves
- Profit at risk – Measure estimating the potential decline in profit under adverse market conditions
- Earnings at risk – Estimate of the potential impact of market movements on a firm's earnings
- Cash flow at risk – Estimate of the potential impact of market movements on a firm's earnings
- Asset liability management – Framework for managing risks arising from mismatches between assets and liabilities
- Market liquidity – Finance property of an asset
- Liquidity regulation
