= Société de mathématiques appliquées et industrielles =

French scientific society aiming at promoting applied mathematics

The Société de mathématiques appliquées et industrielles (SMAI) is a French scientific society aiming at promoting applied mathematics, similarly to the Society for Industrial and Applied Mathematics (SIAM).

SMAI was founded in 1983 to contribute to the development of applied mathematics for research, commercial applications, publications, teaching, and industrial training. As of 2009, the society has nearly 1300 members, including both individuals and institutions.

SMAI is directed by an administration elected by the general assembly. Its chief activities are:

- to organize conferences and workshops,
- to publish the thrice-yearly bulletin Matapli, which contains overviews, book reviews, and information about theses and upcoming conferences,
- to publish scholarly journals including Modélisation mathématique et analyse numérique (M2AN), Control, Optimisation and Calculus of Variations (COCV), Probabilités et statistiques (P&S), Recherche opérationnelle (RO), ESAIM: Proceedings and Surveys, and the cross-disciplinary journal MathematicS in Action (MathS in A.).

== Prizes ==
- Prix Jacques-Louis Lions, established in 2003 with INRIA et le CNES, recognized by the French Academy of Sciences
- Prix Blaise Pascal, established in 1984 with GAMNI, recognized by the French Academy of Sciences
- Grand Prix Louis Bachelier established in 2007 with the NATIXIS Foundation for Quantitative Research, awarded by the French Academy of Sciences until 2012 and jointly with the London Mathematical Society since 2014.
- Prix Lagrange de l'ICIAM, established in 1998 with SEMA (Spain) and SIMAI (Italy)
- Prix Maurice Audin, awarded by SMF and SMAI

== Interest groups ==
SMAI contains five special interest groups, organized by specific mathematical areas, as follows:

- SMAI-GAMNI (Groupe thématique pour l’Avancement des Méthodes Numériques de l’Ingénieur) which promotes the use of numerical analysis in industry.
- SMAI-MAIRCI (Mathématiques appliquées, informatique, réseaux, calcul, industrie) which is at the frontiers of interdisciplinary applied mathematics.
- SMAI-MAS (Modélisation aléatoire et statistique) which promotes the use of statistics and probability in industry.
- SMAI-MODE (Mathématiques de l’optimisation et de la décision) which is dedicated to fields such as nonlinear analysis, optimization, discrete mathematics, operational research, and mathematical modeling in economics, finance, and the social sciences.
- SMAI-SIGMA (Signal - Image - Géométrie - Modélisation - Approximation; formerly SMAI-AFA Association Française d’Approximation) to promote the study and use of approximations in general.
