= Miriam M. Unterlass =

German chemist

Miriam Unterlass
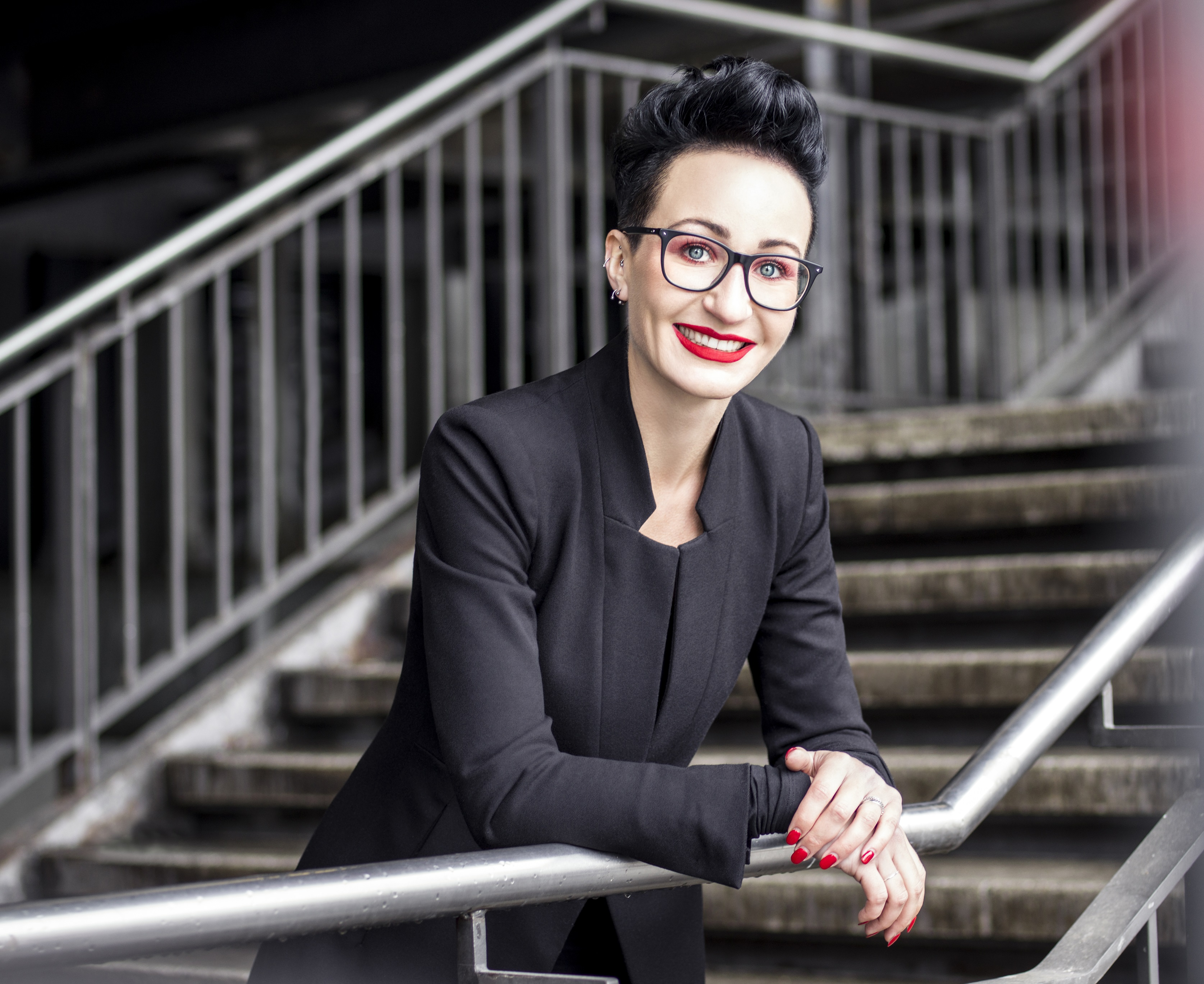
- Born: Miriam Margarethe Unterlass
- Education: Max Planck Institute for Colloids and Interfaces (PhD)
- Scientific career
- Fields: Materials Chemistry; Synthetic Method Development; Polymer Chemistry; Organic Materials; Organic Solid-State Chemistry; Hybrid Materials & Composites; Chemical Biology
- Workplaces: University of Konstanz; CeMM - Research Center for Molecular Medicine of the Austrian Academy of Sciences
- Website: UnterlassLAB

Miriam Margarethe Unterlass (born 1986 in Erlangen, West Germany) is a German chemist. She is full professor of solid state chemistry at the University of Konstanz, as well as adjunct principal investigator at CeMM - Research Center for Molecular Medicine of the Austrian Academy of Sciences. On 1 October 2024, Prof. Miriam Unterlass took over the management of the renowned Fraunhofer Institute for Silicate Research ISC in Würzburg.

== Education and career ==
Miriam M. Unterlass was born in 1986 in Erlangen, Germany. She studied chemistry, process engineering and materials science in the framework of a double diploma degree in Würzburg, Germany, in Lyon, France, and in Southampton, United Kingdom. She completed her PhD under the supervision of Professor Markus Antonietti at the Max Planck Institute of Colloids and Interfaces in Potsdam-Golm, Germany. In 2011 she obtained her doctoral degree (magna cum laude) at the University of Potsdam, Germany, with her doctoral work entitled "From Monomer Salts and Their Tectonic Crystals to Aromatic Polyimides: Development of Neoteric Synthesis Routes".

In 2011 she continued her career with a postdoc in the Centre national de la recherche scientifique (CNRS) Laboratory Soft Matter and Chemistry under supervision of Professor Ludwik Leibler at the École supérieure de physique et de chimie industrielles de la ville de Paris (ESPCI). In 2012 she was a visiting scholar at Massachusetts Institute of Technology (MIT) hosted by Professor Gregory C. Rutledge. Later that year, she started as an independent group leader of the research group "Advanced Organic Materials" at the Institute of Materials Chemistry of the Vienna University of Technology (TU Wien). She habilitated (venia docendi) in materials chemistry at TU Wien in 2018 and became assistant professor with tenure in 2019.

In 2018 she joined CeMM - Research Center for Molecular Medicine of the Austrian Academy of Sciences and to date works as adjunct principal investigator. In 2021 she became an associate professor at TU Wien and since May 2021 she is full professor of solid state chemistry at the University of Konstanz, Germany. In 2022 she was guest professor at the Department of Chemical Science and Engineering of Institute of Science Tokyo (formerly known as Tokyo Institute of Technology), Japan, hosted by Professor Shinji Ando.

== Research ==
Miriam Unterlass is a prominent researcher in the field of chemistry, known for her innovative work at the intersection of materials science and synthetic chemistry. Her research primarily focuses on the development of sustainable routes towards advanced materials and small molecules. The latter is based on the central hypothesis that water is able to be a near-universal solvent for chemical synthesis and processing. She has made significant contributions to the understanding of the use of water as a core technology. Her group has demonstrated that water is an ideal medium to produce advanced materials, profiting from the properties of water under hydrothermal conditions. This approach utilizes hot liquid water as a reaction medium, producing a variety of materials, i.e. high-performance polymers suitable for aeronautics and microelectronics, small molecules relevant to biology and medicine or optoelectronics, and inorganic-organic hybrid materials. Moreover, her group employs modern computational and automation approaches to aim for maximal efficiency and discovery of new materials to address the various challenges of human life. She has published over 40 peer-reviewed articles, contributed with more than 80 scientific talks at different conferences. Thus, she has submitted over 7 patents and patent applications, and actively works alongside industry partners to translate her findings into practical applications.

== Selected publications ==
- F. A. Amaya-García and M. M. Unterlass*: "Synthesis of 2,3-Diarylquinoxaline Carboxylic Acids in High-Temperature Water" Synthesis 2022, 54(15), 3367-3382.
- F. A. Amaya-García, M. Caldera, A. Koren, S. Kubicek, J. Menche, and M. M. Unterlass*: "Green hydrothermal synthesis of fluorescent 2,3-diarylquinoxalines and large-scale computational comparison to existing alternatives", ChemSusChem 2021, 14(8), 1853-1863.
- M. J. Taublaender, S. Mezzavilla, S. Thiele, F. Glöcklhofer, and M. M. Unterlass*, "Hydrothermal Generation of Conjugated Polymers on the Example of Pyrrone Polymers and Polybenzimidazoles", Angew. Chem. Int. Ed. 2020, 59, 15050-15060.
- M. J. Taublaender, F. Glöcklhofer, M. Marchetti-Deschmann, and M. M. Unterlass*: "Green and Rapid Hydrothermal Crystallization and Synthesis of Fully Conjugated Aromatic Compounds", Angew. Chem. Int. Ed. 2018, 57, 12270-12274.
- M. M. Unterlass*: "Hot Water Generates Crystalline Organic Materials", Angew. Chem. Int. Ed. 2018, 57, 2292-2294.
- L. Leimhofer, B. Baumgartner, M. Puchberger, T. Prochaska, T. Konegger, and M. M. Unterlass*: "Green one-pot synthesis and processing of polyimide-silica hybrid materials", J. Mater. Chem. A. 2017, 5, 16326-16335.
- B. Baumgartner, A. Svirkova, J. Bintinger, C. Hametner, M. Marchetti-Deschmann, and M. M. Unterlass*: "Green and highly efficient synthesis of perylene and naphthalene bisimides is nothing but water", Chem. Commun. 2017, 53, 1229-1232.
- B. Baumgartner, M. J. Bojdys, and M. M. Unterlass*: "Geomimetics for Green Polymer Synthesis: Highly Ordered Polyimides via Hydrothermal Techniques", Polym. Chem. 2014, 5, 3771-3776.

== Memberships ==
- Member of the German Society of Materials Science (DGM), since 2023
- Member of the International Society for Advancement of Supercritical Fluids (ISASF), since 2023
- Member of the International Solvothermal and Hydrothermal Association (ISHA) and representative for Austria, since 2019
- Member of the Young Academy of the Austrian Academy of Sciences (ÖAW), since 2018
- Member of the Royal Society of Chemistry (MRSC), since 2015
- European Crystallographic Association (ECA), since 2015
- German Association of University Professors and Lecturers (DHV), since 2014
- Austrian Chemical Society (GÖCH), since 2013
- German Chemical Society (GDCh), since 2005

== Awards and honors ==
- 2023 Roy-Somiya Award of the International Solvothermal and Hydrothermal Association (ISHA) for her "Outstanding contributions to the field of hydrothermal and solvothermal synthesis by a scientist under the age of 45”
- 2023 Nomination for the LUKS teaching Awards of the University of Konstanz
- 2022 Appointment to the Scientific Advisory Board - Materials Field - of the Federal Institute for Materials Research and Testing (BAM) for the term 2022 - 2025
- 2021 Appointment to the Board of trustees of the Hochschuljubileumsfonds of the city of Vienna
- 2020 National Patent Award (Staatspreis Patent) from the Austrian Federal Ministry for Climate Action, Environment, Energy, Mobility, Innovation, and Technology
- 2020 Bürgenstock JSP Fellow of the Swiss Chemical Society (SCS)
- 2020 Associate Editor of the Journal of Materials Chemistry A (Royal Society of Chemistry, RSC)
- 2020 Associate Editor of the journal Materials Advances (RSC)
- 2020 Member of the selection committee for scholarships and representative for Solid State and Materials Chemistry of the Alexander von Humboldt Foundation
- 2020 Selected as Mentoring lecturer and member of the selection committee of the Austrian Study Foundation (Österreichische Studienstiftung)
- 2019 Member of the Scientific Advisory Board of the European Forum Alpbach
- 2019 Member of AcademiaNet, nominated by the Austrian Science Fund (FWF)
- 2019 Full member of the Wolfgang Pauli Institute (WPI) Vienna
- 2019 Finalist in the RSC Emerging Technologies competition (Category: Enabling Technologies) with UGP Materials
- 2018 Selected as one of 100 Women in Materials Science by the Royal Society of Chemistry
- 2018 Selected for the International Visitor Leadership Program (IVLP) of the U.S. Department of State’s Bureau of Educational and Cultural Affairs (Specific program: “Hidden No More: Empowering Women Leaders in Science, Technology, Engineering, the Arts, and Mathematics (STEAM”)
- 2018 Elected Member of the Young Academy of the Austrian Academy of Sciences
- 2018 Sallinger Fonds S&B (Science-to-Business) award to UGP Materials
- 2017 START prize of the Austrian Science Fund (FWF)
- 2017 PHÖNIX award (Austrian founders award) in the category “best prototype”
- 2017 Selected for the Hochschullehrer-Nachwuchs-Workshop of the German Chemical Society (GDCh), section for Macromolecular Chemistry
- 2016 Member of the Fast Track program (“Excellence and Leadership Skills for Outstanding Women in Science”)of the Robert Bosch Foundation
- 2016 Named one of the Young Talents 2016 by the journal Macromolecular Chemistry and Physics
- 2016 Pro Didactica Awards 2016, 2nd place in the category best lecture within the BSc curriculum “Technical Chemistry” at TU Wien for “Inorganic Chemistry I”
- 2016 Pro Didactica Awards 2016, 2nd place in the category fairest exam within the BSc curriculum “Technical Chemistry” at TU Wien for “Inorganic chemistry I”
- 2016 INiTS Startup-Camp Award 2016 for best overall concept presented at the i^{2}c StartAcademy
- 2015 Young Participant of the Lindau Nobel Laureate Meeting 2015
- 2015 Named one of the Emerging Investigator 2015 by the journal Polymer Chemistry
- 2014 Anton Paar Science Award by the Austrian Chemical Society (Goech)
- 2014 One of six finalist for the Austrian Innovator of the Year Award 2014
