= Nizar Touzi =

French-Tunisian mathematician

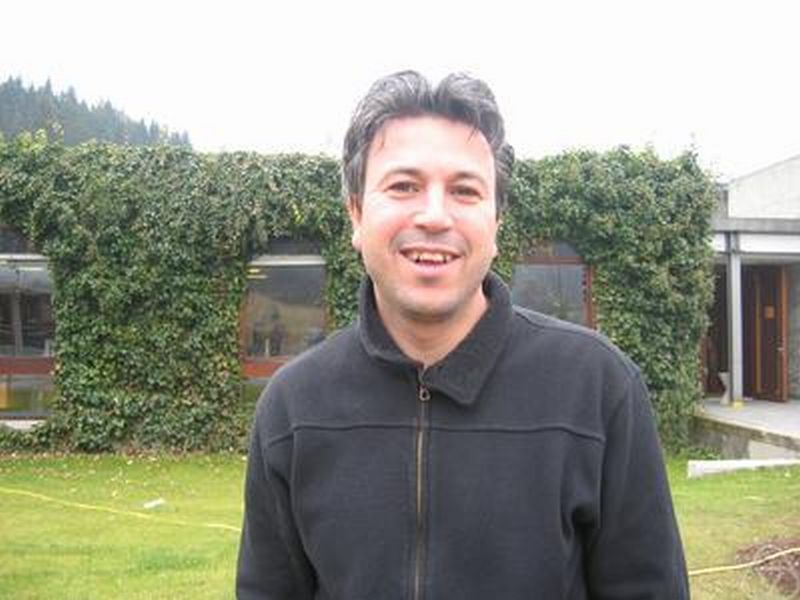
- Touzi in Oberwolfach
- Born: 1968 (age 57–58); Tunisia
- Education: Université Paris IX - Dauphine
- Scientific career
- Fields: Mathematics
- Thesis: Modèles à volatilité stochastique : arbitrage, équilibre et inférence statistique (1993)
- Doctoral advisor: Éric Michel Renault

Nizar Touzi (born 1968 in Tunisia) is a Tunisian-French mathematician. He is a professor of applied mathematics at École polytechnique. His research focuses on analysis, statistics and algebra. He is being known for publications on optimization and stochastic control.

== Education ==
Touzi completed his PhD in Applied Mathematics at the Paris Dauphine University under Éric Michel Renault in January 1994. He began his post-doctoral studies at the University of Chicago, doing such from October 1993 to May 1994. After this, he had an HDR at his alma mater, Paris Dauphine University, in January 1999.

== Career ==
Touzi began his academic career as an assistant professor at this same institution in September 1994. He worked there for five years before becoming a professor of applied mathematics at Pantheone-Sorbonne University in Paris in September 1999.

Touzi’s most cited work, Applications of Malliavin Calculus to Monte Carlo Methods in Finance, was published right before this career change in August 1999. In 2001, Touzi transitioned to the Center for Research in Economics and Statistics to continue teaching applied mathematics. Along with teaching, he also co-led the Finance and Insurance Laboratory at CREST. Between 2001 and 2005, Touzi was an invited professor at multiple institutions, including the University of British Columbia, Princeton University, and the Center for Interuniversity Research and Analysis of Organizations.

In September 2005, Touzi accepted a new position as the Chair in Mathematical Finance at the Tanaka Business School of Imperial College London. He worked at the Tanaka Business School for almost a year before holding his most recent and current position as a professor of applied mathematics at École polytechnique. He was also the head of the Department of Applied Mathematics at École polytechnique from September 2014 to August 2017.

== Research ==
Touzi's most cited paper, Applications of Malliavin Calculus to Monte Carlo methods in finance, co-authored by Eric Fournié, Jean-Michel Lasry, Jérôme Lebuchoux and Pierre-Louis Lions, describes an original probabilistic method to compute option contract Greeks: delta, gamma, theta, and vega. The method is derived from the formula for integration-by-parts and uses principles from Malliavin calculus. Their approach, when computed on standard European option contracts and compared to results yielded from the Monte Carlo method, happens to be more efficient. This paper had a significant impact in the world of mathematical finance, as previous option contract pricing models were based around the Black-Scholes model and Monte Carlo simulations.

== Awards ==
- Best Young Researcher in Finance Award 2007 of the Europlace Institute of Finance.
- The University of Toronto Dean’s Distinguished Visitor Chair, Fields Institute, April-June 2010.
- Invited Session Speaker at the International Congress of Mathematics, August 2010, Hyderabad (India).
- ERC Advanced Grant 2012.
- French Academy of Science Bachelier Prize 2012.
- Oxford University Visiting Man Chair, One month within the period January July 2014.
- Minerva Lectures at Columbia University, October 2013, New York.
- Monetary Authority of Singapore (MAS) Visiting Professor, National University of Singapore, January-February 2018, Singapore.
- Van Eenam, Butcher, and Butcher Financial/Actuarial Faculty Lecture, the University of Michigan, Department of Mathematics, April 2018, Ann Arbor.
