= Monique Jeanblanc =

French mathematician and economist

Monique Jeanblanc-Picqué (born 1947) is a French mathematician known for her work in mathematical finance; other topics in her research have included control theory and probability theory. She is a professor emerita at the University of Évry Val d'Essonne.

== Education and career ==
Jeanblanc was a student at the Ecole Normale Supérieure de Cachan from 1966 to 1969, when she took a teaching position there. In 1992 she moved to the University of Évry.

== Books ==
Jeanblanc is the author or coauthor of the books including

- Enlargement of Filtration with Finance in View (with Anna Aksamit, Springer, 2017)
- Mathematical Methods for Financial Markets (with Marc Yor and Marc Chesney, Springer, 2009)
- Marchés financiers en temps continu: valorisation et équilibre (with Rose-Anne Dana, Economica, 1998), translated into English as Financial Markets in Continuous Time (Springer, 2003)

== Recognition ==
In 2009, Jeanblanc was made a chevalier in the Legion of Honour.
