= Swiss Solvency Test =

Standard for insurance companies

The Swiss Solvency Test (SST) is a risk-based capital standard for insurance companies in Switzerland, in use since 2006. The SST was developed by the Swiss Federal Office of Private Insurance (FOPI) in cooperation with the Swiss insurance industry.

The SST measures risks using the following basic principles:

- Financial instruments with market prices must be recognized on the balance sheet at market price
- Capital requirements must be risk-based
- The balance sheet must be assessed as a whole without any off-balance sheet positions

== See also ==
- Solvency II
- Capital adequacy ratio
