= Sub auspiciis Praesidentis =

Academic degree in Austria

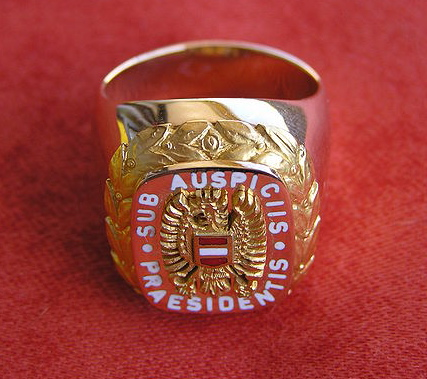
The ring of honour until 2013, with a seal containing the stylized coat of arms of Austria and the words sub auspiciis Praesidentis

Promotio sub auspiciis Praesidentis rei publicae (Latin for Doctoral graduation under the auspices of the Federal President), often abbreviated as sub auspiciis doctoral graduation (German: Sub Auspiciis Promotion), is a special form of doctoral graduation and the highest possible distinction for academic achievements for a doctoral degree in Austria.

== Promotio sub auspiciis Imperatoris (Monarchy) ==
Awards comparable to the sub auspiciis graduation can be traced back to the foundation of universities at the end of the Middle Ages and can be found in verifiable Promotiones sub auspiciis Imperatoris (Latin imperator, 'emperor') since the first half of the 17th century. The Promotio sub auspiciis Imperatoris is first mentioned in a document of the University of Graz, where under Emperor Ferdinand II the tribute was paid to a count in 1625. First presented in Vienna in 1661, this custom continued until the end of the Austro-Hungarian Empire. The Jesuits, to whom the University of Vienna was subordinated through the Sanctio pragmatica (1623–1773), seem to have contributed significantly to this development with the involvement of the court.

Until the middle of the 18th century, the honour was almost exclusively bestowed on sons of the high nobility, but already during the reign of Maria Theresa the regulations were relaxed. Of the graduations held under her, 31 (of a total of 53) were already bourgeois. The first woman, however, was not awarded a doctorate under the auspices of the Federal President until 1953 at the University of Vienna.

For the earliest period of this type of excellence doctorate, there is neither an imperial decree nor a university directive that makes the necessary conditions for being awarded a doctorate under the auspices of the emperor apparent. However, the sources do show that the same conditions had to be met from the very beginning of the award, which were later—as an important milestone—stipulated by a ministerial order of 28 August 1888, which listed as requirements not only the excellent performance at school and university, but also dignified conduct by the chosen candidate.

The solemn ceremonial act has essentially been preserved since the 17th century. After the reception of the imperial representative, the seats were taken in compliance with a certain seating order and accompanied by the sounds of the marching fanfares. This was followed by the welcoming of the guests and a brief overview of the history of the award. Afterwards the Dean presented the candidate in front of the assembly, who bowed three times before the portrait of the Emperor and handed out his printed theses. Only then the actual disputation began. After this the candidate bowed again and was led to the emperor's representative who, after a speech, presented him with the imperial gift.

== Promotio sub auspiciis Praesidentis rei publicae (Austrian Second Republic) ==
On 5 March 1952, the Second Republic passed a federal law on the awarding of doctorates under the auspices of the Federal President. The law was last amended in 1968 and the mandatory requirements for the sub-auspiicis doctorate are currently:

- Excellence in all upper grades of a secondary school
- Matriculation examination (Matura) with distinction
- In the course of study, very good grades in all partial examinations of the diploma, bachelor and master examinations as well as in the final examination (Rigorosum).
- Best marks for the scientific written papers (diploma or master thesis and dissertation)

The requirements are determined by the Senate of the University by notice and submitted to the Federal Ministry of Education, Science and Research and the Presidential Chancellery for approval. While conventional doctorates are only of a formal nature, sub auspiciis candidates may not hold the academic degree doctor) until after the sub auspiciis ceremony.

== Ceremony ==
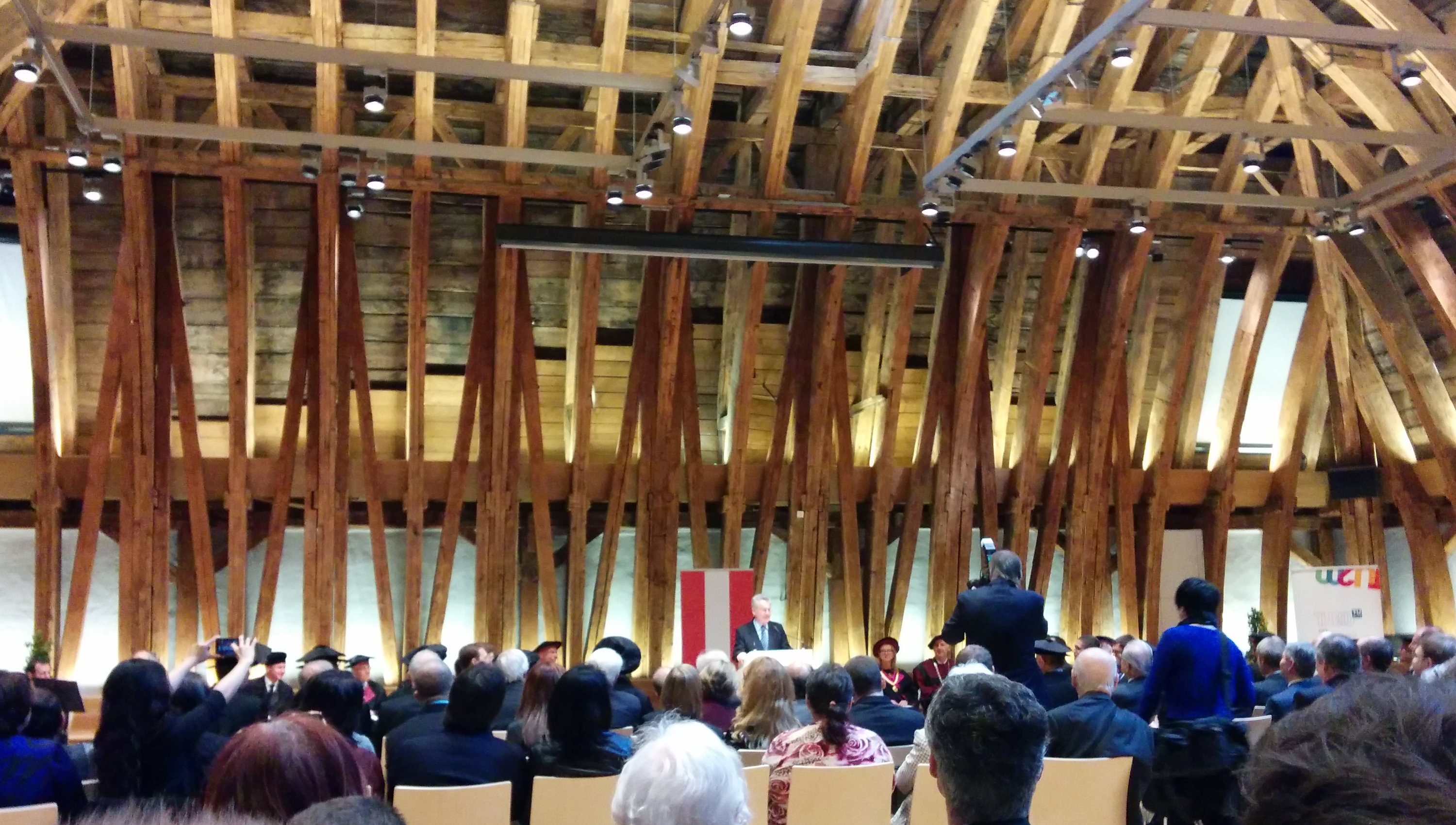
Ceremonial Act of the graduation sub auspiciis on 28 March 2014 with President of Austria Dr. Heinz Fischer in the newly renovated cupola of the TU Wien.

The PhD celebration itself is a special ceremony for the doctoral candidates and takes place in the presence of President of Austria. The president may, however, send a representative, which in practice generally only happens in case of illness. The doctoral candidate is free to give a "speech on a scientific topic approved by the highest academic authority".

At the University of Vienna, the doctorate sub auspiciis Praesidentis traditionally takes place on dies academicus, the founding day of the university on 12 March.

After the actual doctoral graduation with the oath and pledge, the Federal President bestows the ring of honour with the inscription sub auspiciis Praesidentis on the candidate who has now been awarded the doctorate.

== Ring of honor ==
Since 1820, a ring of honour bearing the name of the reigning monarch has been awarded as a gift of honour to all sub auspiciis graduates. Since March 1952, section 4 of the Federal Law on the award of doctorates under the auspices of the Federal President has stipulated that the Federal President awards all doctors who have received their doctorates under his auspices a ring of honour, the seal of which contains the federal coat of arms and the words sub auspiciis Praesidentis. On the occasion of the 60th anniversary of the Federal Law in 2012, a redesign of the ring of honour was commissioned, which has been awarded since the end of 2013.

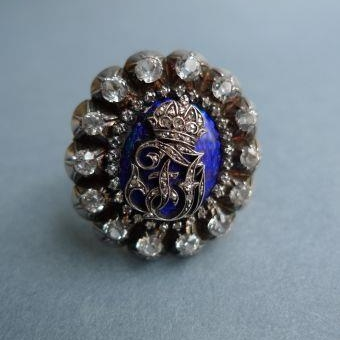
The ring of honour in times of the Austro Hungarian Empire (ca. 1900). Golden ring with monogram of Emperor Franz Joseph under an imperial crown on blue enamel in an oval. Monogram and crown are surrounded by 28 smaller and 14 larger diamonds set in gold. On the left and right side each a crowned double-headed eagle with breastplate.

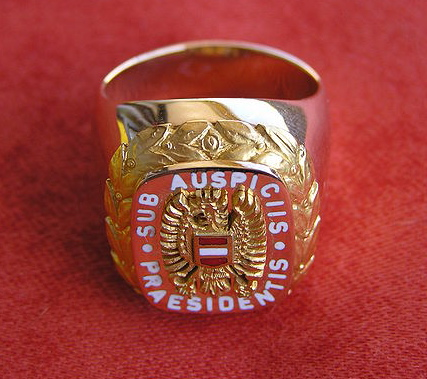
The ring of honour of the Second Republic until October 2013. Made from 14-carat gold and enamel by jeweller A. E. Köchert in Vienna.

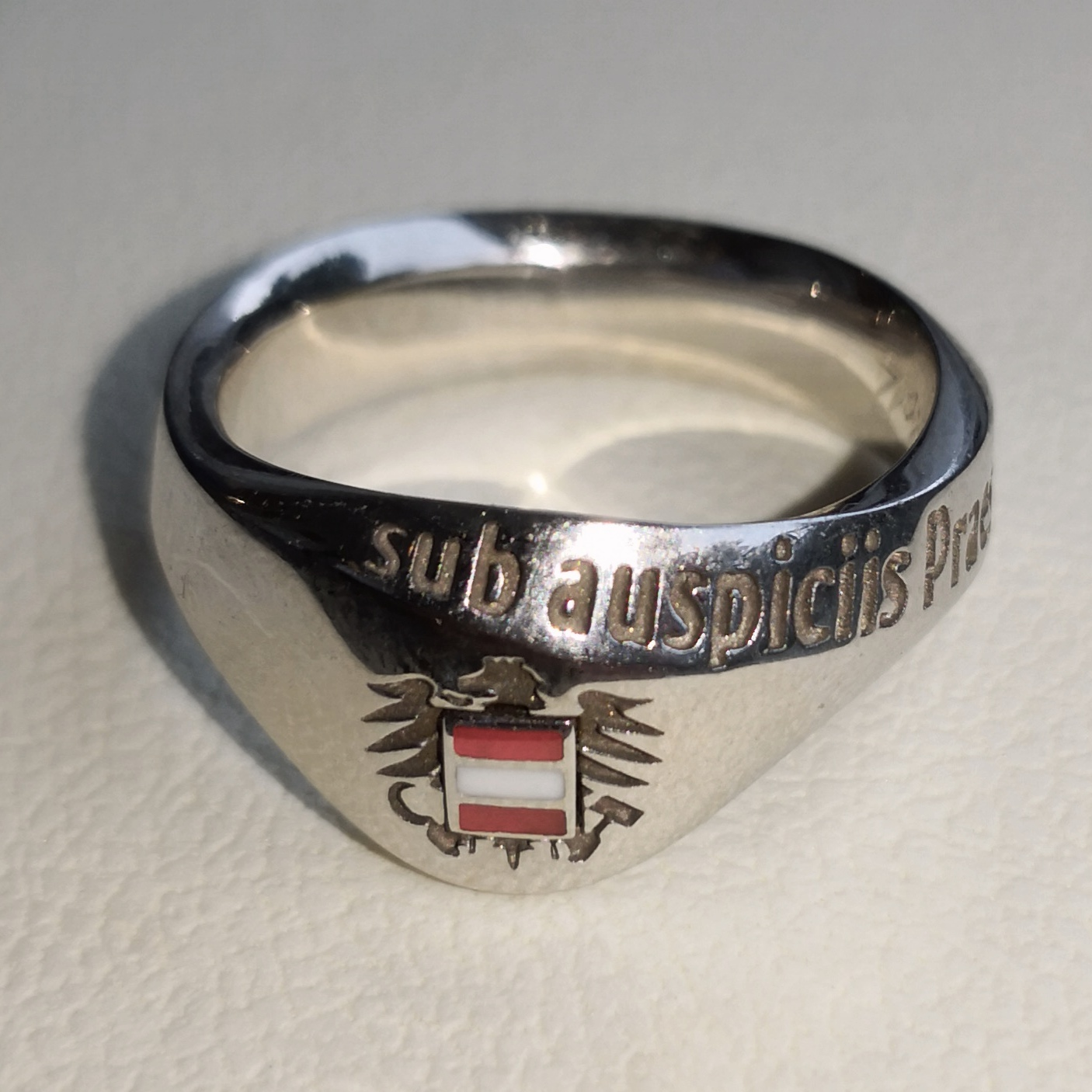
The current ring of honour, awarded since October 2013. Made of white gold by A. E. Köchert in Vienna. Redesigned on the occasion of the 60th anniversary of the Federal Law on the sub auspiciis doctorate.

== Statistics ==
Currently, an average of about 20 students per year receive their doctorate sub auspiciis (out of a total of about 2500 doctoral students per year) in Austria. In the first 60 years since the passing of the Federal Law on the Award of Doctorates under the auspices of the Federal President on 5 March 1952, 1042 (296 women and 746 men) have been awarded the corresponding doctorates. Since 1952, nine people have succeeded in obtaining doctorates in two subjects sub auspiciis each.

Distribution of sub auspiciis praesidentis doctorates by universities (as of March 2012)
University	First award of a doctorate sub auspiciis	Total	Women	Men
University of Vienna	1953	373	119	254
University of Graz	1954	174	63	111
University of Innsbruck	1952	174	63	111
University of Salzburg	1968	80	29	51
TU Wien	1964	126	16	110
Graz University of Technology	1954	43	0	43
University of Leoben	1973	5	0	5
University of Natural Resources and Life Sciences, Vienna	2008	3	1	2
Vienna University of Economics and Business	1977	4	1	3
University of Linz	1972	38	5	33
University of Klagenfurt	1987	8	5	3
Medical University of Vienna	2004	5	3	2
Medical University of Graz	2004	7	4	3
Medical University of Innsbruck	2004	1	1	0
University of Music and Performing Arts Vienna	2004	1	0	1
Mozarteum University Salzburg	2007	1	1	0
University of Applied Arts Vienna	2011	1	1	0
TOTAL		1042	296	746

Distribution of sub auspiciis praesidentis doctorates by academic (as of March 2012)
		Total	Women	Men
Dr. phil.	Doctor of humanities and cultural sciences, Doctor of philosophy	498	172	326
Dr. techn.	Doctor of technical sciences	198	20	178
Dr. med. univ.	Doctor of medicine and medical science	161	64	97
Dr. rer. nat	Doctor of natural sciences	121	28	93
Dr. iur.	Doctor of law	22	1	21
Dr. rer. soc. oec.	Doctor of social and economic sciences	18	5	13
Dr. theol.	Doctor of theology	14	3	11
Dr. mont.	Doctor of montanist sciences	5	0	5
Dr. nat. techn.	Doctor of natural resources and life sciences	3	1	2
Dr. phil. fac. theol.	Doctor of philosophy at the catholic theological faculty	1	1	0
Dr. scient. med.	Doctor of medical science	1	1	0
TOTAL		1042	296	746

== Notable recipients ==
- Harald Buchinger (theologist)
- Helmut Denk (pharmacologist, former president of the Austrian Academy of Sciences)
- Heinz Engl (mathematician)
- Hildegard Goss-Mayr (peace activist and writer, first woman to receive the doctorate sub auspiciis at a Viennese university in 1953)
- Harald Grobner (mathematician)
- Victor Franz Hess (Nobel laureate in physics 1936, sub auspiciis Imperatoris 1906 under Emperor Franz Joseph)
- Lothar Höbelt (historian)
- Peter Husslein (gynaecologist)
- Lisa Kaltenegger (astronomer and astrophysicist)
- Markus Müller (pharmacologist, rector of the Medical University of Vienna)
- Harald Niederreiter (mathematician)
- Klaus Pekarek (manager and member of the board of Uniqa Österreich AG)
- Rudolf Taschner (mathematician)

== Erwin Schrödinger and the sub auspiciis doctoral graduation ==
The Austrian physicist and Nobel laureate Erwin Schrödinger (Nobel Prize in Physics 1933) would have fulfilled all the requirements for the doctoral graduation sub auspiciis Imperatoris in 1910, but at the University of Vienna only three candidates per year were allowed to receive this honour. Erwin Schrödinger would have been the fourth. He was awarded a doctorate in 1910, only four years after his Matura in July 1906, without an honorary doctorate to become a doctor of philosophy.

== Collegium sub auspiciis prasidentis promotorum ==
The Collegium sub auspiciis prasidentis promotorum is a non-profit association founded in Vienna in 2016 with the aim of establishing a network of sub auspiciis graduates and using this network for the promotion of gifted students in Austria.

== Literature ==
- Walter Brunner: Die Promotio sub auspiciis. 2., ergänzte Auflage. Bundesministerium für Wissenschaft und Forschung, Wien 1990, ISBN 3-85456-231-4.
- Bundesministerium für Wissenschaft und Forschung (Hrsg.): Im Zeichen der Ringe. 60 Jahre Promotion unter den Auspizien des Bundespräsidenten, Wien 2012 (mit namentlicher Auflistung der über 1000 sub auspiciis Promovierten im Zeitraum 20. Dezember 1952 bis 5. März 2012).
