= Professorship of Mathematical Finance =

The position of Professor of Mathematical Finance in the Mathematical Institute of the University of Oxford was established in 2002. It is one of the six Statutory professorships in Mathematics at Oxford. From 2005 to 2015, the position was designated as 'Nomura Chair of Mathematical Finance' and endowed by Nomura. The post is associated with a professorial fellowship at St. Hugh's College, Oxford.

== List of Professors of Mathematical Finance ==
The holders of the Chair have been:

- XunYu Zhou, 2008–2016.
- Rama Cont, 2018-

== See also ==
- List of professorships at the University of Oxford
