= Austrian Science Fund =

- Fonds zur Förderung der wissenschaftlichen Forschung
- Logo
- Abbreviation: FWF
- Formation: 4 March 1968; 58 years ago
- Location: Vienna
- Website: fwf.ac.at

The Austrian Science Fund (German: Fonds zur Förderung der wissenschaftlichen Forschung, FWF) is the most important Austrian funding organization for basic research. The FWF supports research in science, engineering, and the humanities through a large variety of grant programmes, prizes and by funding infrastructure. The self-governed organization is based in Vienna and financed by the Austrian federal government.

In September 2023 president Christof Gattringer voiced funding concerns: a three-year budget consensus previously reached with the Ministry of Education is lacking confirmation by the Ministry of Finance despite continuing high inflation in Austria.

== Organisation ==
The Austrian Science Fund was established in 1967 and had a budget of 91 million euros in 2001. Most projects are individual research grants for up to three years. In addition, it also supports national research clusters, doctoral schools, scholarships for young researchers and awards like the START- and Wittgenstein-Preis. Pascale Ehrenfreund was elected president of the FWF on 6 June 2013. In recent years, the Austrian Science Fund provides growing support for the publication of articles and monographs in the open access format.

== Membership ==
The Austrian Science Fund is a member of the European Science Foundation.

== See also ==
- Open access in Austria
