= List of nominees for the Nobel Prize in Physiology or Medicine (1910–1919) =

The following is a list of people first nominated for the Nobel Prize in Physiology or Medicine between 1910 and 1919 by year of first nomination.

The Nobel Prize in Physiology or Medicine (Swedish: Nobelpriset i fysiologi eller medicin) is awarded annually by the Nobel Assembly at the Karolinska Institute to scientists who have made outstanding contributions in physiology or medicine. It is one of the five Nobel Prizes which were established by the will of Alfred Nobel in 1895.

Every year, the Nobel Committee for Physiology or Medicine sends out forms, which amount to a personal and exclusive invitation, to about three thousand selected individuals to invite them to submit nominations. The names of the nominees are never publicly announced, and neither are they told that they have been considered for the Prize. Nomination records are strictly sealed for fifty years. However, the nominations for the years 1901 to 1953 are publicly available. Despite the annual sending of invitations, the prize was not awarded in nine years (1915–1918, 1921, 1925, 1940–1942) and has been delayed for a year five times (1919, 1922, 1926, 1938, 1943).

From 1901 to 1953, 935 scientists were nominated for the prize, 63 of which were awarded either jointly or individually. 19 more scientists from these nominees were awarded after 1953. Of the 13 women nominees, only G.Th.Cori was awarded the prize. Besides some scientists from these nominees won the prizes in other fields (including years after 1953): J.Boyd Orr - Peace Prize (1949); L.C.Pauling twice - in Chemistry (1954) and Peace Prize (1962); 3 - in Physics and 20 - in Chemistry (including Fr.Sanger twice - in 1958 and 1980).

In addition, nominations of 65 scientists (including one woman) were declared invalid by the Nobel Committee.

== See also ==
- List of nominees for the Nobel Prize in Physiology or Medicine (1901–1909)
- List of nominees for the Nobel Prize in Physiology or Medicine (1920–1929)
- List of nominees for the Nobel Prize in Physiology or Medicine (1930–1939)
- List of nominees for the Nobel Prize in Physiology or Medicine (1940–1949)
- List of nominees for the Nobel Prize in Physiology or Medicine (1950–1959)

== 1910–1919 ==
Picture	Name	Born	Died	Years nominated	Notes
1910
	Robert Bárány (Note: "Work on the physiology and pathology of the vestibular apparatus and cerebellum")	April 22, 1876 Vienna, Austria-Hungary	April 8, 1936 Uppsala, Sweden	1910, 1913, 1914	Won the 1914 Nobel Prize in Physiology or Medicine a year later (Note: “for his work on the physiology and pathology of the vestibular apparatus”)
	Henri Huchard (Note: "Work on the blood circulation organs")	April 4, 1844 Auxon, Aube, France	December 1, 1910 Clamart, France	1909, 1910	
	Octave Gengou	February 27, 1875 Ouffet, Belgium	April 25, 1957 Brussels, Belgium	1910	Nominated jointly (Note: "Work on immunity, the principles of sera diagnostics") with J.Bordet by Ph.Ch.Ern.Gaucher the only time
	Eduard Strasburger (Note: "Investigations on the anatomy and physiology of the cell")	February 1, 1844 Warsaw, Congress Poland, Russian Empire	May 18, 1912 Bonn, German Empire	1910	Nominated by Osc.Hertwig the only time
	Edouard Van Beneden (Note: "Work on embryology")	March 5, 1846 Leuven, Belgium	April 28, 1910 Liège, Belgium	1910	Nominated by Fernand Schiffers the only time but died before the only chance to be rewarded
	Ludwig Edinger (Note: "Work on the brain´s history of development")	April 13, 1855 Worms, Grand Duchy of Hesse, German Confederation	January 26, 1918 Frankfurt, German Empire	1910	
	Karl Joseph Eberth (Note: "The discovery of the typhus bacilli")	September 21, 1835 Würzburg, Kingdom of Bavaria, German Confederation	December 2, 1926 Halensee, Berlin, Weimar Germany	1910, 1911	
	John Hughlings Jackson (Note: "Study of Jacksonian epilepsy and the lesions in diseases of the brain")	April 4, 1835 Providence Green, Green Hammerton, Yorkshire, England	October 7, 1911 London, England	1910, 1912	Nominated by F.M.Sandwith only
	Louis Hubert Farabeuf (Note: "work on therapeutic surgery and amputations")	May 6, 1841 Bannost-Villegagnon, France	August 13, 1910 Beton-Bazoches, French Third Republic	1910	Nominated by professor M.Pineda from Cádiz the only time but died before the only chance to be rewarded
	Gustav Fritsch (Note: "Work on the anatomy and importance of area centralis in human, and on the structure and importance of brain localization")	March 5, 1838 Cottbus, Kingdom of Prussia, German Confederation	June 12, 1927 Berlin, Weimar Germany	1910, 1911, 1912	
	Wilhelm Alexander Freund (Note: "Method for uterine extirpation")	August 26, 1833 Krappitz, Kingdom of Prussia, German Confederation	December 24, 1917 Berlin, German Empire	1910, 1914	
	Wilhelm Heinrich Erb (Note: "Work on electro diagnostics and neuro pathology")	November 30, 1840 Winnweiler, Kingdom of Bavaria, German Confederation	October 29, 1921 Heidelberg, Weimar Germany	1910, 1914	
	Ludimar Hermann (Note: "Work on electrical currents in muscles and nerves")	October 31, 1838 Berlin, Kingdom of Prussia, German Confederation	June 5, 1914 Königsberg, German Empire	1910, 1914	
	Raphaël Lépine (Note: "Investigations on diabetes")	July 6, 1840 Lyon, France	November 17, 1919	1910, 1911, 1912, 1913, 1914, 1916	
	Friedrich von Müller (Note: "Work on metabolic diseases")	September 17, 1858 Augsburg, Kingdom of Bavaria, German Confederation	November 18, 1941 Munich, Nazi Germany	1910, 1917	
	Nathan Zuntz (Note: "Extensive work in the field of physiology; work on the physiology of blood, circulation and respiration, heat regulation and so on")	October 6, 1847 Bonn, Kingdom of Prussia, German Confederation	March 22, 1920 Berlin, Weimar Germany	1910, 1919, 1920	
	Victor von Ebner (Note: "Histological work, especially on bones")	February 4, 1842 Bregenz, Austrian Empire	March 20, 1925 Vienna, Austria	1910, 1915, 1922	Nominated by G.A.Pommer from Innsbruck only
	August von Wassermann (Note: "Serum reaction in syphilis")	February 21, 1866 Bamberg, Kingdom of Bavaria, German Confederation	March 16, 1925 Berlin, Weimar Germany	1910, 1911, 1912, 1913, 1914, 1915, 1916, 1919, 1920, 1921, 1922, 1923, 1924	
	Bernhard Naunyn (Note: "Investigations on icterus and diabetes; work on neurology")	September 2, 1839 Berlin, Kingdom of Prussia, German Confederation	July 26, 1925 Baden-Baden, Weimar Germany	1910, 1918, 1922, 1924, 1925	
	Simon Flexner (Note: "Serum treatment of cerebrospinal meningitis")	March 25, 1863 Louisville, Kentucky, United States	May 2, 1946 New York City, United States	1910, 1912, 1913, 1914, 1915, 1917, 1920, 1929	
	Paul Uhlenhuth (Note: "Research on immunity")	January 7, 1870 Hanover, Kingdom of Prussia, North German Confederation	December 13, 1957 Freiburg im Breisgau, Germany	1905, 1910, 1911, 1914, 1915, 1920, 1923, 1926, 1927, 1928, 1929, 1930, 1932, 1933, 1935, 1936, 1937, 1938, 1952, 1955	
1911
	Willem Einthoven (Note: "Work on the string galvanometer")	May 21, 1860 Semarang, Dutch East Indies	September 29, 1927 Leiden, Netherlands	1911, 1913, 1914, 1917, 1919, 1920, 1921, 1922, 1924	Won the 1924 Nobel Prize in Physiology or Medicine (Note: “for his discovery of the mechanism of the electrocardiogram”)
	Saturnin Arloing (Note: "Work on tuberculosis and vaccination against anthrax")	January 3, 1846 Cusset, France	March 21, 1911 Lyon, France	1910, 1911	Died before the only chance to be rewarded
	Arthur van Gehuchten (Note: "Work on the anatomy of the nervous system")	April 20, 1861 Antwerp, Belgium	December 9, 1914 Cambridge, England	1911	
	Ivan Horbachevsky (Note: "The synthesis of uric acid")	May 15, 1854 Zarubińce, Galicia, Austrian Empire	May 24, 1942 Prague, Nazi Germany	1911	Nominated by V.Janovský the only time
	Sergei Winogradsky (Note: "Work on nutrition")	September 1, 1856 Kiev, Russian Empire	February 25, 1953 Brie-Comte-Robert, France	1911	Nominated for Nobel Prize in Chemistry too.
	Alexander Dogiel (Note: "Work on the human retina and on nerve endings in different organs")	January 27, 1852 Ponevezh, Kovno Governorate, Russian Empire	November 19, 1922 Petrograd, Russia	1911	Nominated by Vl.Palladin the only time
	Jean Casimir Félix Guyon (Note: "Work on the physiology, pathology and surgery of the urinary tracts")	July 21, 1831 Saint-Denis, Réunion, France	August 2, 1920 Paris, France	1911, 1920	
	Elias von Cyon (Note: "for work on endocrine secretion and cardiovascular innervation")	March 25, 1843 Telšiai, Kovno Governorate, Russian Empire	November 5, 1912 Paris, France	1911	Nominated by P.Albertoni the only time
	Yves Delage	May 13, 1854 Avignon, France	October 7, 1920 Sceaux, France	1911, 1912, 1915	Nominated jointly (Note: "Work on artificial parthenogenesis") with J.Loeb only
	Napoleon Nikodem Cybulski (Note: "Work on the registration of blood flow, the action of the suprarenal gland, and the muscle electricity")	September 14, 1854 Kryvanosy, Sventsyansky Uyezd, Vilna Governorate, Russian Empire	April 26, 1919 Kraków, Poland	1911, 1912, 1914, 1918	
	Jaume Ferran i Clua (Note: "Work on cholera and tuberculosis")	February 1, 1851 Corbera d'Ebre, Spain	November 22, 1929 Barcelona, Spain	1911, 1912, 1913, 1915, 1920, 1921	
1912
	Alexis Carrel (Note: "Work on the continuation of life in isolated tissues")	June 28, 1873 Sainte-Foy-lès-Lyon, France	November 5, 1944 Paris, France	1911, 1912, 1913	Won the 1912 Nobel Prize in Physiology or Medicine (Note: “in recognition of his work on vascular suture and the transplantation of blood vessels and organs”)
	Svante Arrhenius (Note: "Work on immunochemistry")	February 19, 1859 Wik Castle, Sweden	October 2, 1927 Stockholm, Sweden	1912, 1914	Won the 1903 Nobel Prize in Chemistry (Note: “in recognition of the extraordinary services he has rendered to the advancement of chemistry by his electrolytic theory of dissociation”) and nominated for Nobel Prize in Physics too
	Oscar Loew (Note: "Discovery of the antibacterial effect of formaldehyde")	April 2, 1844 Marktredwitz, Kingdom of Bavaria, German Confederation	January 26, 1941 Berlin, Nazi Germany	1912	Nominated by R.Emmerich the only time
	Louis-Antoine Ranvier (Note: "All the work Ranvier has done")	October 2, 1835 Lyon, France	March 22, 1922 Vendranges, France	1912	Nominated by E.Suchard the only time
	John Benjamin Murphy (Note: "Work as a clinical teacher of surgery and discovery, practical application and wide diffusion of clinical methods")	December 21, 1857 Appleton, Wisconsin, United States	August 11, 1916 Mackinac Island, Michigan, United States	1912	Nominated by W.A.Evans from Northwestern University the only time
	Friedrich Trendelenburg (Note: "Contributions to the abdominal surgery")	May 24, 1844 Berlin, Kingdom of Prussia, German Confederation	December 15, 1924 Nikolassee, Berlin, Weimar Germany	1912	Nominated by B.M.C.L.Riedel the only time
	Camillo Bozzolo (Note: "Work on the pathology and treatment of anchylostomiasis")	May 30, 1845 Milan, Kingdom of Lombardy–Venetia	February 28, 1920 Turin, Kingdom of Italy	1912, 1918	
	Alexandre-Guillaume Moutier (Note: "for his work on arterial hypertension")	?	?	1912	Nominated by professor Emmanuel Doumer (10.6.1858 Thenon - 3.10.1932 Lille) from Lille the only time
	Joseph Denys (Note: "for studies on the mode of action of serums, discovery of bacteriotropins and the reintroduction of the treatment from 1896 of tuberculosis")	July 24, 1857 Ruisselede, Belgium	March 27, 1932	1912	Nominated by Manille Ide (3.3.1866 - 25.5.1945) the only time
	Mary Edwards Walker (Note: "for the "discovery of preventative of heart failure"")	November 26, 1832 Oswego, New York, United States	February 21, 1919 Oswego, New York, United States	1912	Nominated by MD A.S.Helton from Washington, DC the only time
	Sahachiro Hata (Note: "Work on chemotherapy")	March 23, 1873 Masuda, Shimane, Japan	November 22, 1938 Tokyo, Japan	1912, 1913	Nominated for Nobel Prize in Chemistry too
	Carlo Forlanini (Note: "Work on artificial pneumothorax")	June 11, 1847 Milan, Kingdom of Lombardy–Venetia	May 26, 1918 Nervi, Kingdom of Italy	1912, 1913, 1914, 1917, 1919	
	Constantin von Monakow (Note: "Work on the normal and pathological anatomy of the brain")	November 4, 1853 Bobretsovo, Vologda Governorate, Russian Empire	October 19, 1930 Zürich, Switzerland	1912, 1921	Nominated by Fr.von Müller only
	Arthur Looss (Note: "Life-long studies on parasitology and discovery of the route of entry of Ankylostoma duodenale into the human body")	March 16, 1861 Chemnitz, Kingdom of Saxony, German Confederation	May 4, 1923 Giessen, Weimar Germany	1912, 1923	
	Edoardo Perroncito (Note: "Work on anchylostomiasis")	March 10, 1847 Viale, Piedmont, Kingdom of Sardinia	November 4, 1936 Pavia, Kingdom of Italy	1912, 1913, 1914, 1923	
	Vladimir Bekhterev (Note: "Work on the anatomy and pathology of the nervous system")	January 20, 1857 Sarali, Vyatka Governorate, Russian Empire	December 24, 1927 Moscow, Russia	1901, 1902, 1910, 1912, 1914, 1916, 1925	
	Edward Albert Sharpey-Schafer (Note: "Work on the physiology of the organs of endocrine secretion, and in particular the supra-renal capsules and the pituitary gland")	June 2, 1850 Hornsey, Middlesex, England	March 29, 1935 North Berwick, East Lothian, Scotland	1910,1912, 1913, 1929	
	Hans Horst Meyer (Note: "Work on narcosis")	March 17, 1853 Insterburg, Kingdom of Prussia, German Confederation	October 6, 1939 Wienna, Austria	1912, 1917, 1921, 1923, 1933, 1938	
1913
	Lauder Brunton	March 14, 1844 Roxburgh, Scotland	September 16, 1916 London, England	1913	Nominated jointly (Note: "No motivation") with Olof Hammarsten by E.Riegler the only time
	Peter Freyer (Note: "Discovery and perfection of the operation for the total enucleation of the prostate gland")	July 2, 1851 Galway, Ireland, British Empire	September 9, 1921 London, England	1913	Nominated by R.Ross the only time
	Werke Ellenberger (Note: "All the work Ellenberger has done")	March 28, 1848 Beiseförth, Hesse-Kassel, German Confederation	May 5, 1929 Dresden, Weimar Germany	1913	Nominated by J.Vennerholm the only time
	Thor Stenbeck (Note: "Founder of radiotherapy")	July 5, 1864 Övraby, Sweden	August 9, 1914 Oscar Parish, Sweden	1913	Nominated by V.Michaut the only time
	Biagio Longo (Note: "Work on the nutrition of the embryo")	February 4, 1872 Laino Borgo, Kingdom of Italy	November 29, 1950 Rome, Italy	1913	Nominated by Annibale Salomoni (1854 Cremona - 18.4.1917 Rome) the only time
	Charles Lucien de Beurmann (Note: "Work on sporotrichosis")	December 6, 1851 Strasbourg, France	November 26, 1923 Paris, France	1913	Nominated by Georges-Alfred Chavannaz (1866 - 1944) the only time
	Jean-Louis Prévost (Note: "Work on infantile paralysis, eye deviation in hemiplegia, chorda tympani, antagonism between certain poisons, mercury poisoning, the effect of medicines on bile secretion, fibrillary twitches in electrified heart")	May 12, 1838 Geneva, Switzerland	September 12, 1927 Geneva, Switzerland	1913	
	William Küster (Note: "Work on hemoglobin")	September 22, 1863 Leipzig, Kingdom of Saxony, German Confederation	March 5, 1929 Stuttgart, Weimar Germany	1913	Nominated with L.P.Marchlewski only and for Nobel Prize in Chemistry too
	Leon Marchlewski (Note: "Work on chlorophyll and hemoglobin")	December 15, 1869 Włocławek, Warsaw Governorate, Russian Empire	January 16, 1946 Kraków, Poland	1913, 1914	Nominated for Nobel Prize in Chemistry too
	José Gómez Ocaña (Note: "Work on endocrine secretion")	October 28, 1860 Málaga, Spain	July 26, 1919 Madrid, Spain	1913, 1916, 1918	Nominated by Antonio Morales i Pérez (19.4.1848 Álora – 07.12.1930 Barcelona) only
	Johannes von Kries (Note: "Work on the organ of sight")	October 6, 1853 Roggenhausen, Kingdom of Prussia, German Confederation	December 30, 1928 Freiburg im Breisgau, Weimar Germany	1913, 1917, 1920, 1924	
	James Mackenzie (Note: "Work on the physiology of the heart")	April 12, 1853 Scone, Scotland	January 26, 1925 London, England	1913, 1919, 1920, 1921	
	Carlos Chagas (Note: "The discovery of a new trypanosome disease (thyroidite parasitaire)")	July 9, 1879 Oliveira, Minas Gerais, Empire of Brazil	November 8, 1934 Rio de Janeiro, Brazil	1913, 1914, 1921, 1922, 1928	
	William Bayliss	May 2, 1860 Wednesbury, England	August 27, 1924 London, England	1913, 1914	Nominated jointly (Note: "Work on secretin and prosecretin") with Ern.Starling only
	Ernest Starling (Note: "Work on chemical regulations and endocrine secretion")	April 17, 1866 London, England	May 2, 1927 Kingston Harbour, Jamaica, British Empire	1913, 1914, 1926, 1927	
	Hideyo Noguchi (Note: "Work on syphilis")	April 17, 1866 Inawashiro, Fukushima, Japan	May 2, 1927 Accra, Gold Coast, British Empire	1913, 1914, 1915, 1920, 1921, 1924, 1925, 1926, 1927, 1928	
	Emil Abderhalden (Note: "Work on degradation and formation processes of proteins in vivo and in vitro, and fermentive processes")	March 9, 1877 Oberuzwil, Switzerland	August 5, 1950 Zürich, Switzerland	1913, 1914, 1915, 1916, 1917, 1918, 1919, 1920, 1921, 1922, 1923, 1924, 1926, 1927, 1932, 1933, 1934, 1936	Nominated for Nobel Prize in Chemistry too
	Jean Hyacinthe Vincent (Note: "Method for vaccination against typhoid fever")	December 22, 1862 Bordeaux, France	November 23, 1950 Paris, France	1913, 1918, 1919, 1920, 1921, 1922, 1928, 1935, 1936, 1937	
	Ross Granville Harrison (Note: "Work on a method to cultivate tissues in vitro")	January 13, 1870 Germantown, Philadelphia, Pennsylvania, United States	September 30, 1959 New Haven, Connecticut, United States	1913, 1914, 1917, 1919, 1920, 1925, 1933, 1934, 1935, 1936, 1937, 1941	
1914
	Christiaan Eijkman (Note: "Work on Beri-Beri")	August 11, 1858 Nijkerk, Netherlands	November 5, 1930 Utrecht, Netherlands	1914, 1915, 1917, 1919, 1920, 1921, 1924, 1925, 1926, 1927, 1929	Shared the 1929 Nobel Prize in Physiology or Medicine (Note: “for his discovery of the antineuritic vitamin”) with Fr.G.Hopkins
	Vasili Razumovsky (Note: "Work on the surgical treatment of cortical epilepsy, urinary bladder operation, echinococcus and mediastinal operation, anastomosis vaso testiculariis, osteoplastic foot exarticulation, and the foundation of a scientific school in Russia")	April 8, 1857 Efimovka, Buzuluksky Uyezd, Samara Governorate, Russian Empire	April 7, 1935 Yessentuki, Russia	1914	Nominated by I.M.Dogiel the only time
	Jean-Pierre Rousselot (Note: "Work on experimental phonetics; and the phonetics of various languages")	October 14, 1846 Saint-Claud, France	December 16, 1924 Paris, France	1914	Nominated by Aug.Chaillou the only time
	William Hunter (Note: "Investigations in haemolysis, pernicious and septic anaemias and oral sepsis")	June 1, 1861 Ballantrae, Scotland	January 13, 1937 London, England	1914	Nominated by Andrew Melville Paterson (1862 Manchester - 13.2.1919) the only time
	Samuel James Meltzer (Note: "Work on the anaesthesia caused by magnesium salts and work on insufflation")	March 22, 1851 Kovno Governorate, Russian Empire	November 7, 1920 New York, United States	1914	
	Umetaro Suzuki (Note: "Work on essential substances in rice and their importance in beri-beri")	April 7, 1874 Makinohara, Shizuoka, Japan	September 20, 1943 Tokyo, Japan	1914	Nominated for Nobel Prize in Chemistry too
	Edward Tyson Reichert (Note: "Research on the differentiation and specificity of corresponding proteins and an analoguos relation to the starches")	February 5, 1855 Philadelphia, Pennsylvania, United States	December 23, 1931 St. Petersburg, Florida, United States	1914, 1922	
	Bernhard Krönig (Note: "Work on treatment of uterine myoma with X-rays, radium treatment of non surgical uterine cancer")	January 27, 1863 Bielefeld, Kingdom of Prussia, German confederation	October 29, 1917 Freiburg im Breisgau, German Empire	1914, 1917	
	Franz Nissl (Note: "Work on the nervous system and a method to investigate the same")	September 9, 1860 Frankenthal, Kingdom of Prussia, German confederation	August 11, 1919 Munich, Weimar Germany	1914, 1919	
	Hermann Sahli (Note: "Work as a teacher and work on clinical investigation methods")	May 23, 1856 Bern, Switzerland	April 28, 1933 Bern, Switzerland	1914, 1924	
	Casimir Funk (Note: "Work on vitamins")	February 23, 1884 Warsaw, Congress Poland, Russian Empire	November 19, 1967 Albany, New York, United States	1914, 1925	Nominated for Nobel Prize in Chemistry too
	Clemens von Pirquet (Note: "Work on the tuberculin reaction and allergies")	May 12, 1874 Hirschstetten, Austria-Hungary	February 28, 1929 Vienna, Austria	1914, 1920, 1926, 1928, 1929	
	Joseph Babinski (Note: "Work on neurology")	November 17, 1857 Paris, France	October 29, 1932 Paris, France	1914, 1915, 1924, 1928, 1932	
	Edoardo Maragliano (Note: "Work on the serology of and vaccination against tuberculosis")	June 1, 1849 Genoa, Kingdom of Sardinia	March 10, 1940 Genoa, Kingdom of Italy	1910, 1914, 1932, 1940	
	Ferdinand Sauerbruch (Note: "Work on the pressure difference procedure and its practical significance")	July 3, 1875 Barmen, German Empire	July 2, 1951 Berlin, Germany	1913, 1914, 1918, 1919, 1920, 1921, 1922, 1923, 1924, 1925, 1926, 1927, 1931, 1934, 1935, 1937, 1938, 1951	
1915
	Bailey Ashford (Note: "Work on Uncinaria Americana")	September 18, 1873 Washington, D.C., United States	November 1, 1934 San Juan, Puerto Rico	1915	
	Louis Bolk (Note: "The work "Das Cerebellum der Säugethiere"")	December 10, 1866 Overschie, Rotterdam, Netherlands	June 17, 1930 Amsterdam, Netherlands	1915	
	Frederick F. Russell (Note: "Work on the prevention of Typhiod Fever by inoculation with killed cultures of typhoid bacilli")	August 17, 1870 Auburn, New York, United States	December 29, 1960	1915	
	Sigmund Freud (Note: "His work has opened a new era in mental medicine")	May 6, 1856 Freiberg in Mähren, Moravia, Austrian Empire	September 23, 1939 Hampstead, London, England	1915, 1917, 1918, 1919, 1920, 1927, 1929, 1932, 1933, 1936, 1937, 1938	Nominated for Nobel Prize in Literature too
	S. P. L. Sørensen (Note: "Work on the chemistry of the egg white, and the use of physical chemical methods in biology")	January 9, 1868 Havrebjerg, Denmark	February 12, 1939 Copenhagen, Denmark	1915, 1919, 1925, 1934, 1939	Nominated for Nobel Prize in Chemistry too
	August Pi Suñer (Note: "Work in several different subjects; fixation of substances in tissues, work on immunity, pancreas diabetes, the cardiac activity")	August 12, 1879 Barcelona, Spain	January 12, 1965 Mexico City, Mexico	1915, 1920, 1945, 1948, 1949	
1916
	Gustav Zander (Note: "Development of mechanical gymnastics as a method of rehabilitation (Swedish gymnastics)")	29 March 1835 Stockholm, Sweden	17 June 1920 Engelbrekt Parish, Stockholm, Sweden	1916	Nominated by S.Em.P.Haglund the only time
	Bernhard Sigmund Schultze (Note: "Work in gynecology; a textbook on obstetrics; treatment of asphyxia in infants")	December 29, 1827 Freiburg im Breisgau, Grand Duchy of Baden, German Confederation	April 17, 1919 Jena, Weimar Germany	1916	Nominated by Otto Küstner the only time
	Richard Seefelder (Note: "Studies of the development of the human eye, and especially malformations of the eye. His work: Bach und Seefelder "Atlas zur Entwickelungsgeschichte des menschlichen Auges, 1911-13".")	October 17, 1875 Nesslbach, German Empire	October 12, 1949 Innsbruck, Austria	1916	Nominated by M.Salzmann the only time
	Stephanos Kartulis (Note: "Studies on the etiology of dysentery. Proved that dysentery is caused by intestinal amoebae")	October 9, 1852 Chios, Ottoman Empire	April 1920 Alexandria, British protectorate Sultanate of Egypt	1916	Nominated by R.Ross the only time
	William St. Clair Symmers Sr. (Note: "Use of urea as a bacteriocide, and its application in the treatment of wounds (Lancet, December 4, 1915, p. 1237; Lancet, December 25, 1915, p. 1428)")	October 4, 1863 South Carolina, United States	October 4, 1937 Belfast, Northern Ireland	1916	Nominated by Gr.Ell.Smith the only time
	Francois Henrijean (Note: "Pharmacodynamics ("Pharmacodynamie", Paris 1913)")	December 19, 1860 Spa, Belgium	August 18, 1932 Spa, Belgium	1916, 1920	Nominated by H.Frenkel only
	Pierre Germain Marie Le Damany (Note: "for work on the physiology and therapy of congenital deformation of the hip")	May 27, 1870 Lannion, France	April 20, 1963 Rennes, France	1916	
	Rudolf Kraus (Note: "for blood research, especially diagnosis of cholera, typhus and other diseases through specific precipitation; work in combatting epidemics during war")	October 31, 1868 Jungbunzlau, Austria-Hungary	July 15, 1932 Santiago, Chile	1916	
	Alejandro Mary	1844	1915	1916	Nominated posthumously jointly (Note: "Work on plasmogen") with Albert Mary by R.R.Méndez the only time
	Albert Mary (Note: "Work on histology")	1888	1928	1916, 1918	Nominated by R.R.Méndez only
	Hartog Jacob Hamburger (Note: "The introduction of physical-chemical methods in physiology, and work on phagocytosis and the permeability of the kidneys")	March 9, 1859 Alkmaar, Netherlands	January 4, 1924 Groningen, Netherlands	1906, 1916, 1919, 1920, 1921	Nominated for Nobel Prize in Chemistry too
	Joseph Goldberger (Note: "Showed that pellegra is completely preventable by means of a proper diet. Research on measles and typhus fever")	July 16, 1874 Girált, Austria-Hungary	January 17, 1929 Washington, D.C., United States	1916, 1925, 1929	
1917
	Armand Gautier (Note: "Work on organic arsenic compounds and their therapeutic effect on tuberculosis, malaria and syphilis")	September 23, 1837 Narbonne, France	July 27, 1920 Cannes, France	1913, 1917	Nominated for Nobel Prize in Chemistry too
	Edmund Beecher Wilson (Note: "Work on chromosomes")	October 19, 1856 Geneva, Illinois, United States	March 3, 1939 New York, United States	1917	Nominated by K.Alb.L.Aschoff the only time
	Hermann Gutzmann (Note: "Work on experimental phonetics")	January 29, 1865 Bütow, Kingdom of Prussia, German Confederation	November 4, 1922 Berlin, Weimar Republic	1917	Nominated by Emil Bloch (11.12.1847 Emmendingen - 1920) the only time
	Albert Auguste Toussaint Brachet (Note: "Work on polyspermal fertilization")	January 1, 1869 Liège, Belgium	December 27, 1930 Brussels, Belgium	1917	Nominated by Fr.J.Keibel the only time
	William H. Welch (Note: "Work in State Medicine")	April 8, 1850 Norfolk, Connecticut, United States	April 30, 1934 Johns Hopkins Hospital, Baltimore, United States	1917, 1920, 1921	
	Frank Billings (Note: "The recognition of the source of many chronic diseases in more or less remote foci of infection")	April 2, 1854 Highland, United States	September 20, 1932 Chicago, United States	1917, 1924	
	Ludolf von Krehl (Note: "Internal medicine issues from the biological view of pathophysiology")	December 26, 1861 Leipzig, Kingdom of Saxony, German Confederation	May 26, 1937 Heidelberg, Nazi Germany	1917, 1932	
	Ludwig Aschoff (Note: "Work on sensory physiology in particular")	January 10, 1866 Berlin, Kingdom of Prussia, German Confederation	June 24, 1942 Freiburg im Breisgau, Nazi Germany	1917, 1920, 1923, 1930, 1933, 1934	
	William James Mayo (Note: "Surgical and organizational work")	June 29, 1861 Le Sueur, Minnesota, United States	July 28, 1939 Rochester, Minnesota, United States	1910, 1917, 1921, 1934, 1937	
	William Stewart Halsted (Note: "Work on the parathyroid gland")	September 23, 1852 New York, United States	September 7, 1922 Baltimore, United States	1917	Nominated with V.Czerny and H.W.Cushing by Em.Th.Kocher the only time
	Harvey Cushing (Note: "Work on the pituitary gland")	April 8, 1869 Cleveland, Ohio, United States	October 7, 1939 New Haven, Connecticut, United States	1917, 1923, 1930, 1931, 1932, 1933, 1934, 1935, 1936, 1937, 1938, 1939	
1918
	Fritz Pregl (Note: "Work on micro-analysis")	September 3, 1869 Laibach, Duchy of Carniola, Austria-Hungary	December 13, 1930 Graz, Styria, Austria	1918, 1921, 1923	Won the 1923 Nobel Prize in Chemistry (Note: “for his invention of the method of micro-analysis of organic substances”)
	Julius Hirschberg (Note: "Work on the history of ophthalmiatrics")	September 18, 1843 Potsdam, Kingdom of Prussia, German Confederation	February 17, 1925 Berlin, Weimar Republic	1918	Nominated jointly by K.Sudhoff the only time
	Erwin_Payr	February 17, 1871 Innsbruck, Austria-Hungary	April 6, 1946 Leipzig, Germany	1918	Nominated jointly by K.Sudhoff the only time
	Alexander A. Maximow (Note: "Work on the histogenesis of the placenta, the histogenesis of connective tissue during inflammation and work on the development of the blood elements")	February 3, 1874 Saint Petersburg, Russian Empire	December 4, 1928 Chicago, United States	1918	Nominated by Al.Dogiel the only time
	Abraham Jacobi (Note: "Work in the field of pediatrics")	May 6, 1830 Hartum, Kingdom of Prussia, German Confederation	July 10, 1919 Bolton Landing, New York, United States	1918	Nominated by I.W.Troitzky (1856-1923) the only time
	Otto Heubner	January 21, 1843 Mühltroff, Kingdom of Saxony, German Confederation	October 17, 1926 Loschwitz, Weimar Germany	1918	Nominated by C.T.Noeggerath the only time
	Shimanowski, Alexander Philippovich (Note: "for his own work on transplantation of transparent cornea")	July 16, 1860 Kiev Governorate, Russian Empire	January 3, 1918 Kiev, Ukraine	1918	Al.Ph.Shimanowski died before the only chance to be rewarded. Self-nominations
	Kianizine, Ivan Ivanovich (Note: "for his own work on microbes")	September 6, 1855 Kharkov Governorate, Russian Empire	after 1923 ?	1918, 1919	Al.Ph.Shimanowski died before the only chance to be rewarded. Self-nominations
1919
	August Krogh (Note: "Numerous works on the supply of oxygen in the organism")	November 15, 1874 Grenå, Denmark	September 13, 1949 Copenhagen, Denmark	1919, 1920	Won the 1920 Nobel Prize in Physiology or Medicine (Note: “for his discovery of the capillary motor regulating mechanism”)
	Charles Nicolle (Note: "Work on typhus recurrence, leishmaniasis, infantile splenomegaly, toxoplasma and the filterable virus of influenza")	September 21, 1866 Rouen, France	February 28, 1936 Tunis, French Tunisia	1919, 1920, 1925, 1926, 1927, 1928	Won the 1928 Nobel Prize in Physiology or Medicine (Note: “for his work on typhus”)
	Auguste Forel (Note: "Work on ants, the anatomy of the nervous system, hypnotism and suggestion and contributions to the alcohol issue")	September 1, 1848 villa La Gracieuse at Morges, Switzerland	July 27, 1931 Yvorne, Switzerland	1905, 1914, 1919	Nominated for Nobel Peace Prize too.
	Hermann Oppenheim (Note: "Work on diagnosis and treatment of mental disorders; his textbook on the subject")	January 1, 1858 Warburg, Kingdom of Prussia, German Confederation	May 5, 1919 Berlin, Weimar Germany	1919	Nominated by N.Zuntz the only time but died before the only chance to be rewarded
	Auguste Trillat (Note: "The discovery of the antiseptic properties of formaldehyde and its derivatives, work on the role of acetic aldehyde in the changes of nutrition, and the effect of meteorological factors on bacteria suspended in the air")	February 14, 1861 Le Pont-de-Beauvoisin, Isère, France	April 2, 1944 Douar Ech Chott, French Tunisia	1919	Nominated by Ch.L.Alph.Laveran the only time
	Ido, Yutaka	1881 Okayama, Japan	1919 Tokyo, Japan	1919	Nominated with J.J.B.V.Bordet and jointly (Note: "The discovery of the spirochaete of hemorrhagic icterus") with R.Inada by L.Martin the only time
	Inada, Ryokichi (Note: "for work on the Japanese spirochaete ictero-haemorrhage")	1874 Nagoya, Japan	1950	1919, 1923	
	Francis Gano Benedict (Note: "Work on metabolism")	October 3, 1870 Milwaukee, Wisconsin, United States	April 14, 1957 Machiasport, Maine, United States	1919, 1934	
	Robert Taces (Note: " for the foundation of modern orthopaedic surgery")	?	?	1919	Nominated by Andrew Melville Paterson (1862 Manchester - 13.2.1919) the only time
	Karl Sudhoff (Note: "Work on Paracelsus and medicine in the middle age")	November 26, 1853 Frankfurt am Main, German Confederation	October 8, 1938 Salzwedel, Nazi Germany	1919, 1923	
	Robert Tigerstedt (Note: "Work on physiology, construction of the respirator and studies on nutrition")	February 28, 1853 Helsingfors, Grand Duchy of Finland, Russian Empire	February 12, 1923 Helsinki, Finland	1919, 1923	
	Hendrik Zwaardemaker (Note: "Work on the role of potassium in the organism")	May 10, 1857 Haarlem, Netherlands	September 19, 1930 Utrecht, Netherlands	1919, 1923, 1928, 1930	
	Salomon Eberhard Henschen (Note: "Work in the field of brain pathology, especially the localization of the vision centra")	February 28, 1847 Uppsala, Sweden	December 16, 1930 Stockholm, Sweden	1919, 1920, 1922, 1923, 1924, 1925, 1926, 1930, 1931	
	Joseph Barcroft (Note: "Work on the oxygen affinity of hemoglobin and on the role played by different organs in metabolism")	July 26, 1872 Newry, Northern Ireland, British Empire	March 21, 1947 Cambridge, England	1919, 1926, 1929, 1931, 1933, 1936, 1937, 1939, 1942, 1943	
	Carl Neuberg (Note: "Work on the chemistry and therapy of cancer, the biological effect of light, the differentiation of carbohydrates and on fermentation")	July 29, 1877 Hanover, German Empire	May 30, 1956 New York, United States	1919, 1920, 1925, 1930, 1932, 1934, 1952	Nominated for Nobel Prize in Chemistry too.
