= Boguski =

Boguski (feminine: Boguska; plural: Boguscy) is a Polish surname. Notable people with this surname include:

- Józef Boguski (1853–1933), Polish chemist
- Mark Boguski (died 2021), American pathologist
- Rafał Boguski (born 1984), Polish footballer
