= Wawelberg Bank building =

Bank building in St. Petersburg, Russia

Coordinates: 59.93665°N 30.314198°E

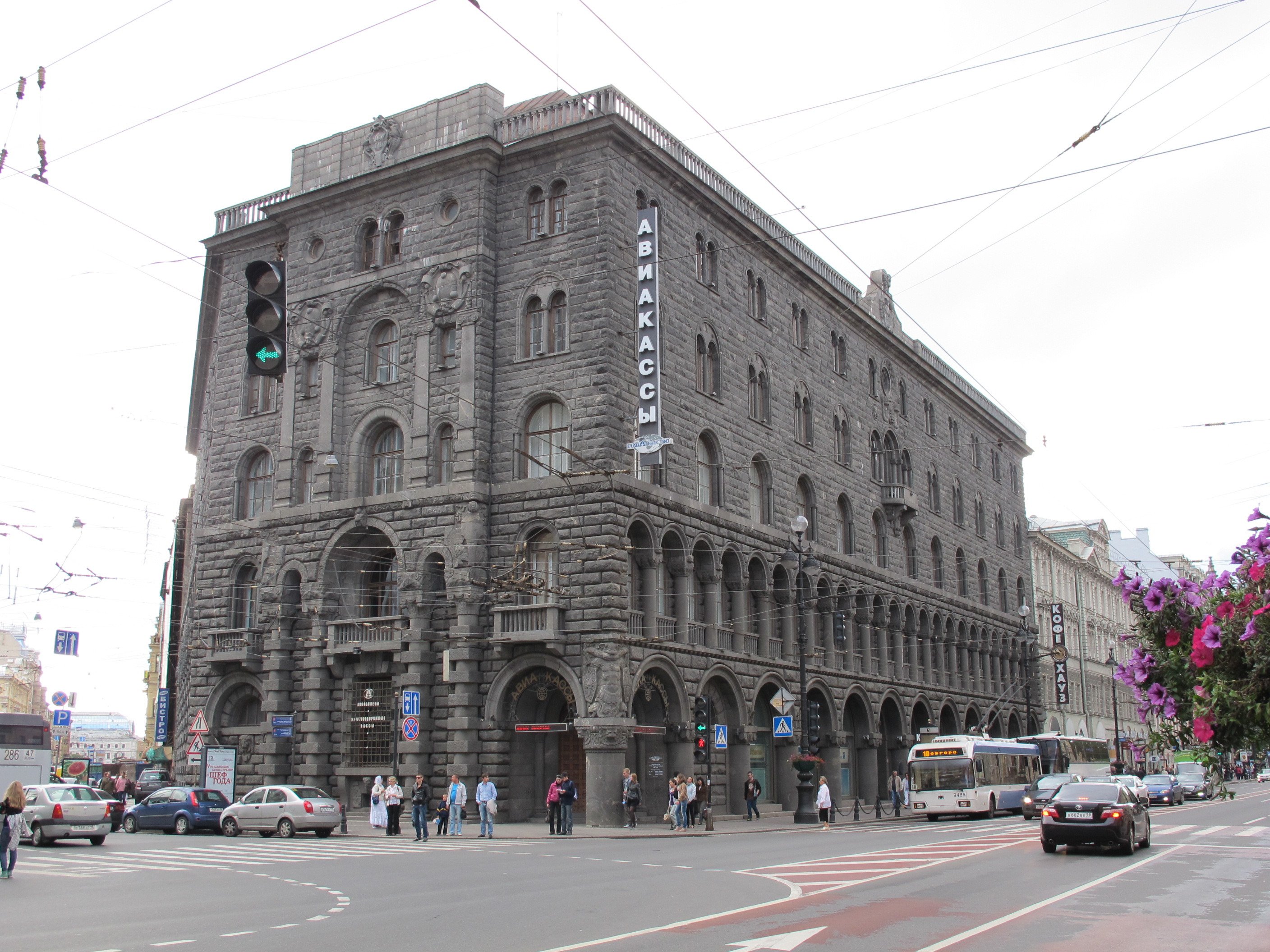
Wawelberg Bank building

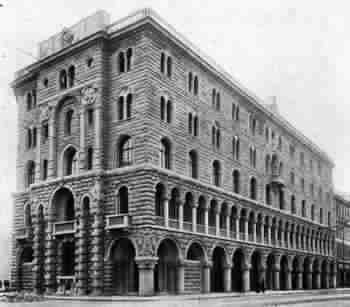
Wawelberg Bank building in St. Petersburg, 1912

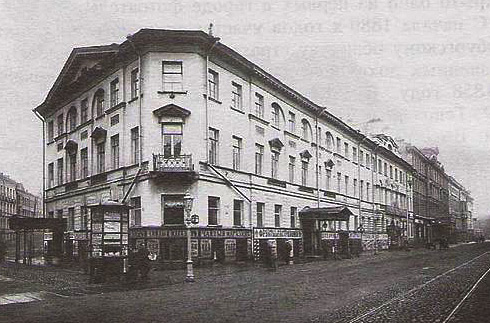
Old 18th century buildings on the lot where Wawelberg Bank building would be erected in 1912. This photograph was taken around 1909

The Wawelberg Bank Building in St. Petersburg, Russia was built by the Wawelbergs - a prominent Polish banking family active in the Russian Empire. Although this building bears initials HW (Hipolit Wawelberg), it was commissioned by his son, Michael Wawelberg.

The Wawelberg Bank Building is an object of cultural heritage of federal significance.

== History ==
The building was completed in 1912 and incorporates the foundation and some of the structure of two separate 18th century buildings. In the 18th century the property owners were two brothers, Semen (Semion) Bernikov and Sergei Bernikov, both wealthy merchants. In the early 19th century one T. Roby (Thomas Roby, Robbie, Т.Роби), a British subject, ran a restaurant or pub in this building. Around the 1850s Bernikov's heirs sold one building to Shchepetilova, and the second structure to some Nochbeck. New owners in turn later sold the structure to Nikolai (Nicholas) and Karl Korpus (Charles Corpus) who remained landlords until they sold both properties to Wawelberg interests in the early 20th century.

== Architecture ==
The structure is a heavy Italianate palazzo built on gargantuan scale - it occupies a full city block. The exterior of the building is made of gray granite. Walls, cornices, columns are richly decorated with northern art nouveau inspired sculptures and bas-reliefs. Many contemporaries considered the building too American, too tasteless, and its appearance generated some heated public debate.
