= Léonie Jeanne Razet =

Secretary of the Radium Institute (1884–1950)

- Born: Léonie Jeanne Pétri; October 18, 1884; 5th arrondissement of Paris, France
- Died: May 27, 1950 (aged 65); 5th arrondissement of Paris, France
- Occupation: Secretary
- Employer: Radium Institute
- Spouse: Jean-Pierre Razet (m. 1907; died 1916)

Léonie Jeanne Razet née Pétri, generally known as Léonie Razet, (18 October 1884— 27 May 1950) was the secretary of Marie Curie at the Radium Institute in Paris. She was married to Jean-Pierre Razet who collaborated with the Curies until his death in 1916.

== Life ==
Born in the 5th arrondissement of Paris on 18 October 1884, Léonie Jeanne Pétri was the daughter of Eustache Pétri and his wife Henriette Marie née Humbert. On 2 October 1907, she married the engineer Jean-Pierre Razet, who had been a colleague of Pierre and later of Marie Curie and had helped set up the Laboratoire Curie during World War I.

Razet first started working at the laboratory in 1918, following the death of her husband. She was initially employed as a personal secretary to Marie Curie. By 1922 her role had evolved into running the secretarial work for the entire laboratory. Razet continued to be Marie Curie's secretary until the later's death in 1934. She remained at the institute until 1947.

Thanks to her keen interest interest in science, she was recruited by Marie Curie on the grounds of her secondary school bacalaureat. She was the Radium Institute's permanent secretary until 1947, where she also served under Curie's daughter Irène Joliot-Curie. She assisted Marie Curie with her heavy administrative workload and also coordinated visitors' appointments.

In 1945, Razet was recorded on 16mm film alongside Frédéric and Irène Joliot-Curie, André Debierne and Francis Perrin made by Raymond Grégoire during the PhD viva of Marguerite Perey and Jean Teillac. The film is now held by the Curie Museum.

Léonie Razet died on 27 May 1950 in the 5th arrondissement of Paris, aged 65.

== See also ==
- List of women associated with Marie Curie and Irène Joliot-Curie
