= Raymond Grégoire =

French physicist (1905–1960)

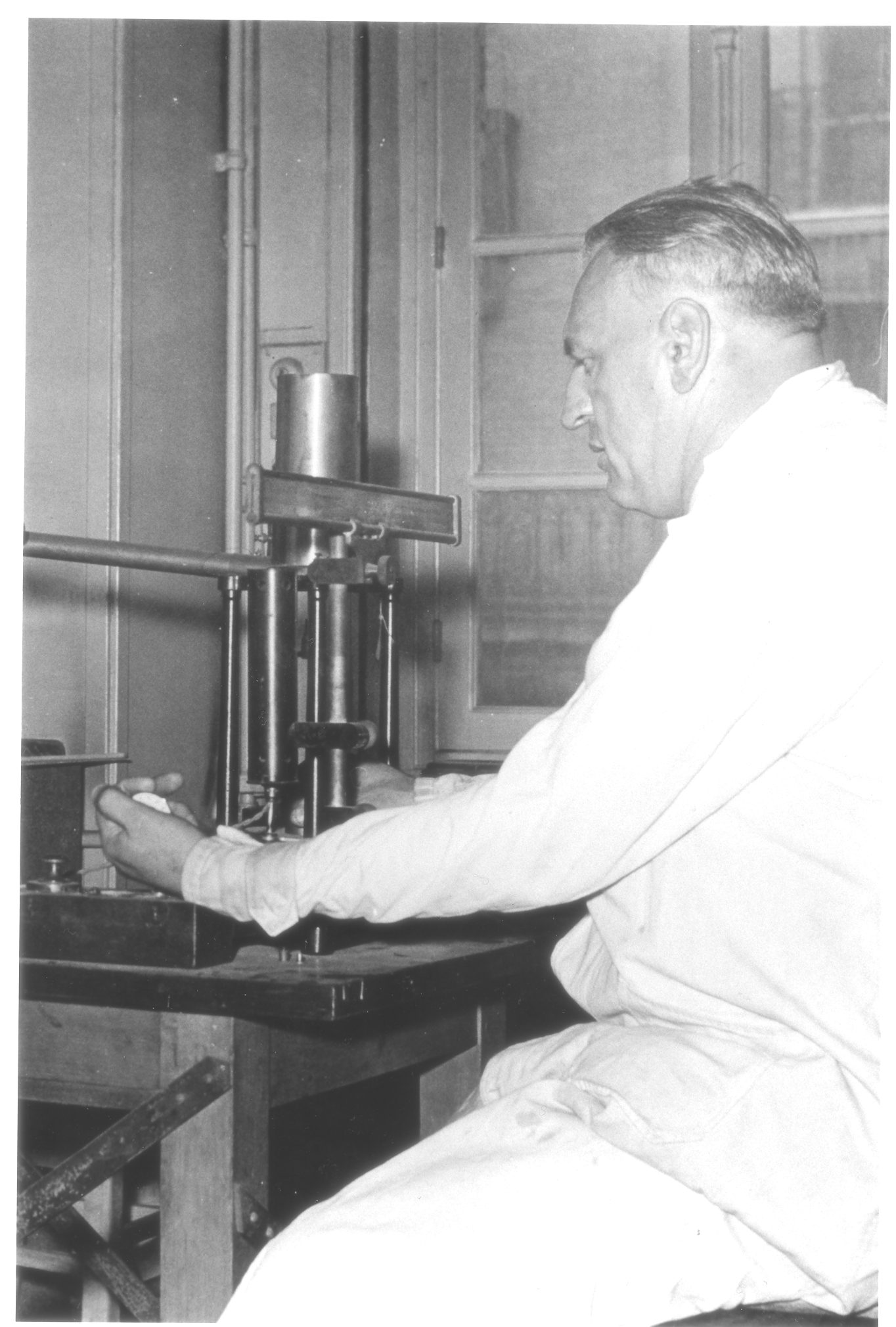
- Raymond Grégoire at the Radium Institute in 1950
- Born: December 31, 1905; 17th Arrondissement, Paris
- Died: March 24, 1960 (aged 54); Paris
- Occupation: Physicist
- Years active: 1927-1960
- Known for: Physicist and protege of Marie Curie

Raymond Grégoire (31 December 1905 – 24 March 1960) was a French teacher and research physicist. He was a PhD student of Marie Curie and made his career at the Curie Laboratory (now preserved as the Curie Museum) in Paris from 1927 to 1960.

== Early life and education ==
Raymond Emile Georges was born in Paris at dawn on 1 January 1906. His father was Émile, Grégoire, an accountant, and his mother was Mélanie Grégoire, née Combes, a stay-at-home wife. His father decided to register the birth for the previous day, 31 December 1905. At that time babies were delivered at home and registering a son a year earlier meant that his army service would also begin a year earlier and the boy would then subsequently enter active life a year earlier.

The young Raymond knew little of his father who was working at Salle Wagram in Paris as an accountant. The latter was called up early in the First World War in 1914, and came back in 1918 having suffered gas attacks. His internal and external injuries led to his death in 1920 after long and painful suffering. Raymond's mother, now a war widow, was given a civil service job as a postwoman to help her to raise Raymond, his sister, and her twin brother who were two years younger than Raymond. However, the bicycle was not provided with the job and she had to find the money to buy one.

Raymond would have started earning his living at 14 years old, as most boys of his age did, if his teacher had not noticed his great academic potential and convinced his mother to let him carry on his studies. Hence, Raymond continued his education at Turgot Higher primary School (École primaire supérieure), known today as Lycée Turgot.

In 1923, he was admitted to the École Supérieure de Physique et Chimie Industrielles de la ville de Paris (ESPCI). He was only 17 years old and the youngest in his class. He graduated second in his class.

== Career in research and teaching ==
On the recommendation of Paul Langevin, then director of the school, he joined the Curie laboratory of the Radium Institute in 1927 as Marie Curie's assistant. It was then that he was called up for military service. Having returned to the laboratory, and having obtained a grant from the Caisse Nationale des Sciences, he published his first article on the ions produced in air by Polonium alpha rays. Marie Curie considered him worthy of interest ("I am really very well pleased with my young Grégoire, I knew he was very gifted") and encouraged Raymond Grégoire to start a Ph.D. thesis under her direction, which he submitted in 1933 on alpha rays. The members of the jury were André Debierne (who discovered Actinium and who succeeded Madame Curie as head of the Laboratory) and also Jean Perrin, who was awarded the Nobel Prize in Physics in 1926. Raymond dedicated his PhD to Madame Curie whom he highly admired and respected and to his mother to whom he was deeply grateful for the great sacrifices she had made in order for him to pursue his higher education.

In 1937 Jean Perrin founded the Palais de la Découverte and entrusted Raymond with the installation of the exhibition rooms devoted to natural and artificial radioactivity. He presented several original experiments. He also displayed Mendeleïev's table in eighteen columns, which had previously been represented in eight columns, a presentation that has since been generalised.

In 1939 he studied cosmic rays near the equator and in the Pacific Ocean with Bertrand Goldschmidt, who was involved in the American Manhattan project to build the first atomic bomb, and was one of the founders of CEA, the French Atomic Energy Commission, of which Goldschmidt became director.

In 1948 he directed the practical work of the Commissariat à l'Energie Atomique (CEA) for the training of engineers specialising in radioactivity. He regularly gave lectures at the Palais de la découverte on various aspects of contemporary physics, in particular on radioactivity. Raymond worked daily with many famous reputable physicists of the early twentieth century who made significant contributions to the understanding of today's physics including,

- André Debierne, who discovered Actinium and succeeded Madame Curie as head of the Curie Laboratory at her death in 1934. He therefore was Raymon’s manager
- Fernand Holweck who improved ultrasound scanning in water with Maurice de Broglie and under the supervision of Paul Langevin. He also improved the power of T.S.F devices. He was tortured to death by the Nazis in 1941.
- Irène Joliot-Curie, daughter of Pierre and Marie Curie, who received the Nobel prize for chemistry for the discovery of artificial radioactivity. She often asked Raymond to give lectures on her behalf in la Sorbonne whenever she was unavailable.
- Frédéric Joliot-Curie who received the exceptional honour of a national funeral
- Marie Curie and Paul Langevin, both interred in the Panthéon.

== Academic career ==
Raymond taught rational electricity at the Charliat school (now ESIGELEC), where he was the successor of Frédéric Joliot-Curie. He also directed the experimental research on electronics at the ESPCI.

His students unanimously recognised his pedagogical qualities, as he knew how to make the most complex parts of physics accessible to them. Most of his students became renowned scientists, some of them entering the French Academy of Sciences, such as Marguerite Perey, the first woman to be admitted there. On holidays he was always surrounded by young people whom he captivated with educational games. The ESPCI library holds the text of a lecture he gave on 18 December 1944 in which he presented the theory of Relativity in a very understandable way.

== Personal life ==
=== Film making as a hobby ===
Raymond loved making 16 mm films as a hobby. The ESPCI library holds one of his films taken at the school in 1945. Another one of his films is in the Curie Museum; it was taken during the PhD viva of Marguerite Perey and Jean Teillac, who became the high commissioner at the French Alternative Energies and Atomic Energy Commission (CEA). In this film, one can also see several famous people such as Madame Razet who was Madame Curie's Sectetary; Frédéric and Irène Joliot-Curie, André Debierne, Francis Perrin who was a brilliant physicist like his father, Jean Perrin.

=== Marriage and children ===
In 1935, Raymond married Jeannine Bret, an excellent pianist and daughter of a machinery manufacturer in Verneuil sur Avre (Normandy). On his way to receive the Nobel Prize in Chemistry with his wife in Stockholm, Frédéric Joliot-Curie stopped over to be the witness at the wedding of his friend and colleague Raymond. The couple had 4 children, born in 1936, 1941, 1944 and 1946. The youngest died of diabetes in 1948.

=== Death ===
Raymond Grégoire died of a cardiac arrest on 24 March 1960 at the Charliat school, while teaching, the thing he liked the most doing, at the age of 54.
