= Józef Boguski =

Polish chemist and cousin of Madame Curie

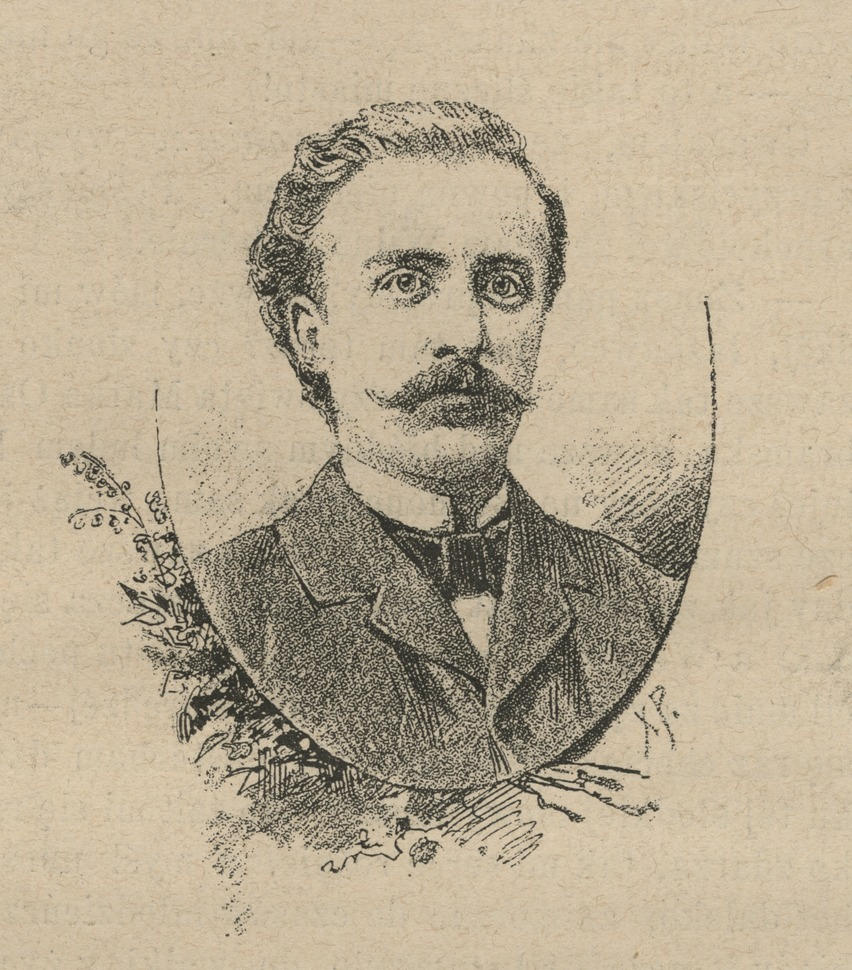

Józef Jerzy Boguski (Polish pronunciation: [ˈju.zɛf bɔguski]; 1853–1933) was a Polish chemist and a professor at the Warsaw Polytechnic.

== Life ==
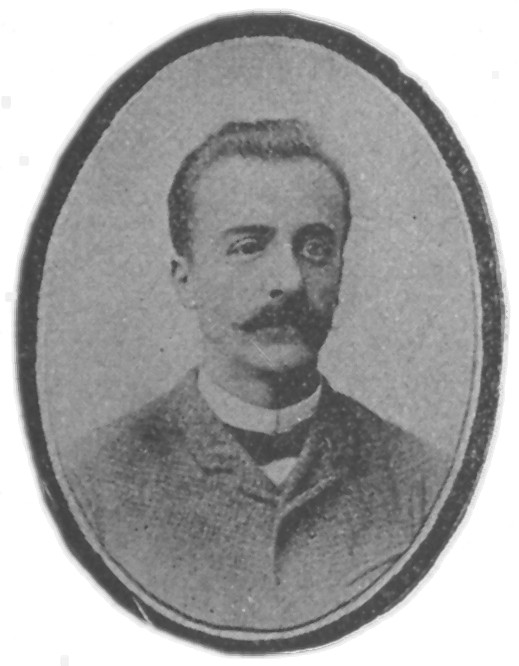
Józef Jerzy Boguski

Boguski served as an assistant in St. Petersburg to the Russian chemist Dmitri Mendeleev.

From 1895 Boguski was a professor at Warsaw's Wawelberg and Rotwand School, and from 1920 at the Warsaw Polytechnic. He carried out pioneering studies in chemical kinetics and formulated "Boguski's rule" concerning the speed of dissolution of solids in liquids.

It was at a laboratory run by Boguski in the Museum of Industry and Agriculture at Krakowskie Przedmieście 66 in Warsaw that his cousin Maria Skłodowska (Marie Curie), future investigator of radioactivity and future double Nobel laureate, in 1890–91 began her practical scientific training.

During World War I, Boguski studied explosives and poisons with military applications. He was also a popularizer of science.

== Honors ==
In 1926 Kraków University and the Warsaw Polytechnic bestowed an honorary doctorate on Boguski. In the same year, he also became an Honorary Member of the Polish Chemical Society.

== See also ==
- List of Poles
