= Pyocyanase =

Antibiotic medication

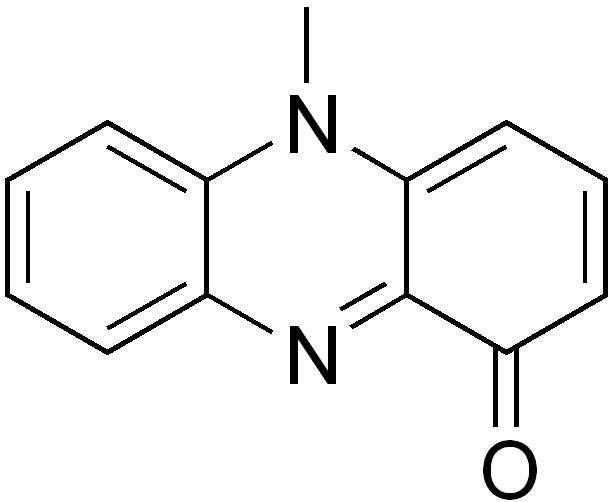
Chemical structure of pyocyanin

Pyocyanase was the first antibiotic drug to be used in hospitals. It is no longer used today. Rudolph Emmerich and Oscar Löw, two German physicians who were the first to make an effective medication from microbes, conducted experiments in the 1890s, roughly 30 years after Louis Pasteur showed that many diseases were caused by bacteria and nearly 40 years before the effective prescription of penicillin. They proved that the germs that caused one disease may be the cure for another.

Emmerich and Löw isolated germs from infected bandages that caused green infections in open wounds. The germ was a bacterium then called Bacillus pyocyaneus (now called Pseudomonas aeruginosa, it produces pyocyanin, a characteristic green-blue phenazine pigment). They then mixed the isolate with other bacteria and showed that B. pyocyaneus and extracts from its cultures were able to destroy other bacterial strains - Vibrio cholerae, Salmonella typhi, Corynebacterium diphtheriae, Bacillus anthracis, Meningococci, staphylococci, streptococci, pneumococci, and gonococci.

From these experiments Emmerich and Löw created a medication based on extracts of B. pyocyaneus that they called pyocyanase. It was the first antibiotic to be used in hospitals. Unfortunately, its effectiveness was inconsistent, did not work equally on all patients, and the presence of large amounts of phenazines such as pyocyanin made it quite toxic to humans. As a result, the drug was eventually abandoned.

== See also ==
- Prontosil
