= Hipolit Wawelberg =

Polish Jewish banker

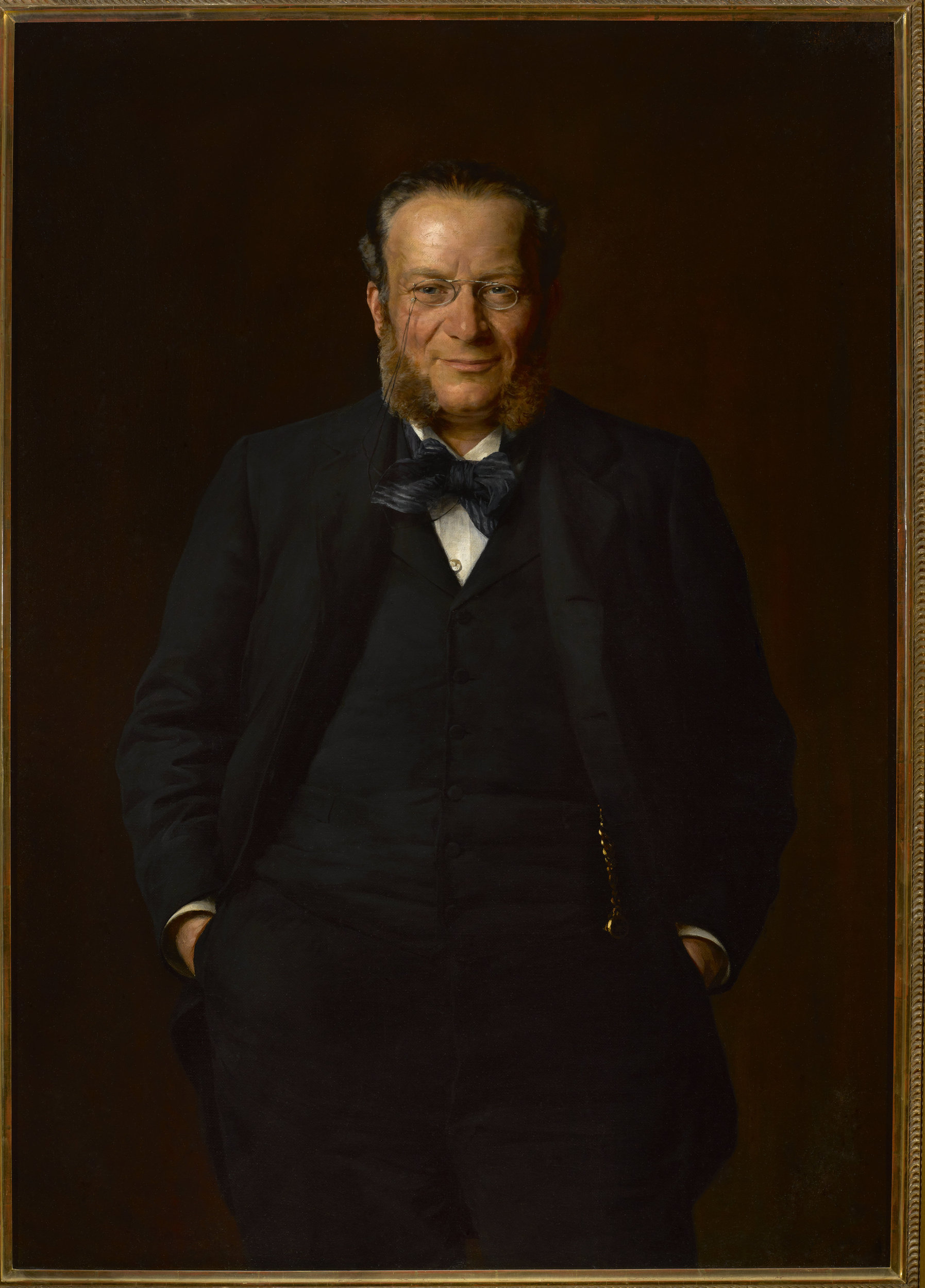
Painting of Hipolit Wawelberg by Kazimierz Pochwalski, 1893

Hipolit Wawelberg (1843–1901) was a Polish banker, and one of the most prominent members of the Wawelberg banking family. He was a known Polish patriot and a lifelong philanthropist.

In 1869, following the January Uprising, Hipolit Wawelberg moved to St. Petersburg where he launched a new venture, the Wawelberg Bank. Wawelberg made a fortune in the Russian Empire, though he was equally well known as a generous philanthropist.

== Banking career ==
By 1900, Wawelberg was at the helm of the Wawelberg Bank and held the title of honorable citizen of St. Petersburg, an appellation that could be passed on in the same way as a title of nobility. He was also a member of the management board of the Warsaw Bank of Commerce (Bank Handlowy w Warszawie), the treasury of the Jewish Colonist Society in St. Petersburg, an honorable member of the Jewish Educational Society (Obshchestvo rasprostraneniya prosveshcheniya sredi yevreyev), and a benefactor of the Roman Catholic Beneficial Society (Rimsko-katolicheskogo blagotvoritel'noye obshchestva).

In 1875, in Warsaw, Wawelberg co-founded the Museum of Industry and Agriculture (Muzeum Przemysłu i Rolnictwa w Warszawie). It was in a physics laboratory there that, in 1890–91, Maria Skłodowska (Marie Curie), future investigator of radioactivity and future double Nobel laureate, did her first scientific work. Wawelberg also founded the Warsaw Mechanical-Technical School in 1895, together with his faithful friend and collaborator, his brother-in-law Stanislav Rotwand (Cтанислав Ротванд), an 1860 alumnus of the University of Saint Petersburg law school.
