= Leon Marchlewski =

Polish chemist (1869–1946)

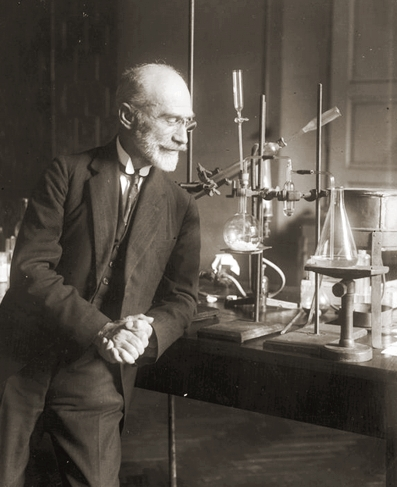
- Marchlewski in 1928
- Born: December 15, 1869; Włocławek, Congress Poland
- Died: January 16, 1946 (aged 76); Kraków, Poland
- Education: ETH Zurich
- Known for: chlorophyll chemistry organic chemistry
- Scientific career
- Fields: Chemistry
- Workplaces: University of Manchester; Jagiellonian University

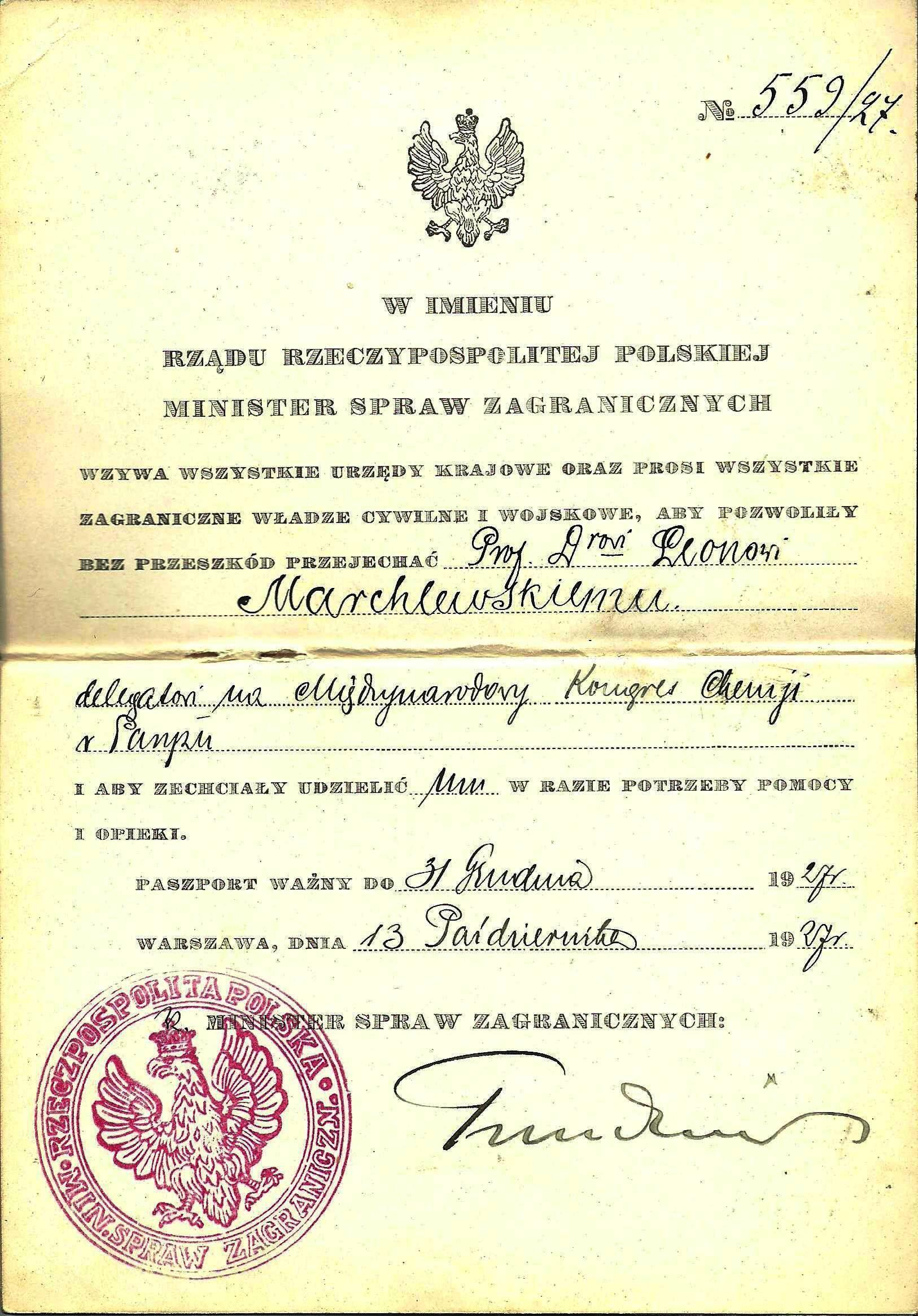
Diplomatic Polish passport used by Dr. Leon Paweł Marchlewski

Leon Paweł Teodor Marchlewski (Polish: [marˈxlɛfski]; 15 December 1869 – 16 January 1946) was a Polish chemist, the first Director and Honorary Member of the Polish Chemical Society. He was one of the founders in the field of chlorophyll chemistry and a precursor of clinical chemistry.

== Life and career ==
He was born in 1869 in Włocławek, Congress Poland to father Józef Marchlewski, a merchant, and mother Emilia (née Rückersfeldt), a governess. His older brother was the communist activist Julian Marchlewski.

In 1888, he went to Zürich and studied chemistry at the ETH Zurich. In 1890, he became an assistant to Professor Georg Lunge. After two years, he earned his doctoral degree. He subsequently went to Kersel near Manchester where he became an assistant of Edward Schunck. In this period he collaborated with Marceli Nencki and conducted research on the chemical affinity of dyes of the animal and plant world.

Between 1896 and 1897, he was on a scientific scholarship granted for his research in the field of organic chemistry from the Kraków-based Academy of Learning (Polish: Akademia Umiejętności, AU). He also taught organic chemistry at the Institute of Science and Technology of the University of Manchester.

In 1900, he returned to Poland and obtained his habilitation on the basis of his thesis Die Chemie des Chlorophylls and lecture titled Dzisiejszy stan teoryi tautomeryi. In the years 1900–1906, he worked as a senior inspector at the General Department of Food Research in Kraków headed by Odo Bujwid. He also became a professor at the Jagiellonian University and served as the university's rector between 1926–1927 and 1927–1928. From 1906 to 1939 he was Head of the Institute of Medicinal Chemistry.

In 1917–1919, he established the National Scientific Institute of Agricultural Economy in Puławy. He was the first director of the Polish Chemical Society and served as the first director of YMCA in Poland.

His scientific work mostly focused on the areas of organic, inorganic and analytic chemistry as well as biochemistry. His scientific achievements include research on chlorophyll and the blood pigment hemoglobin, which demonstrated the similarity of chemical structures in plants and animals, indicating a common origin.

He was nominated for the Nobel Prize in Physiology or Medicine in 1913 and 1914.

The illustration on the right is of his diplomatic passport he used in 1927 to attend an international conference on chemistry in Paris.

Marchlewski was also a long-time political activist in the Polish peasant movement. In December 1945, he became a member of the National Council, representing the Polish People's Party. He died several days later and was buried at the Rakowicki Cemetery.

== Honours ==
- Commander's Cross of the Order of Polonia Restituta (1925)
- Gold Cross of Merit (1936)
- Commander's Cross of the Order of Dannebrog 2nd Class

== See also ==
- List of Polish chemists
- Timeline of Polish science and technology
