= Maria Skłodowska-Curie Museum =

Coordinates: 52°15′5″N 21°0′31″E

Maria Skłodowska-Curie Museum and birthplace, Warsaw
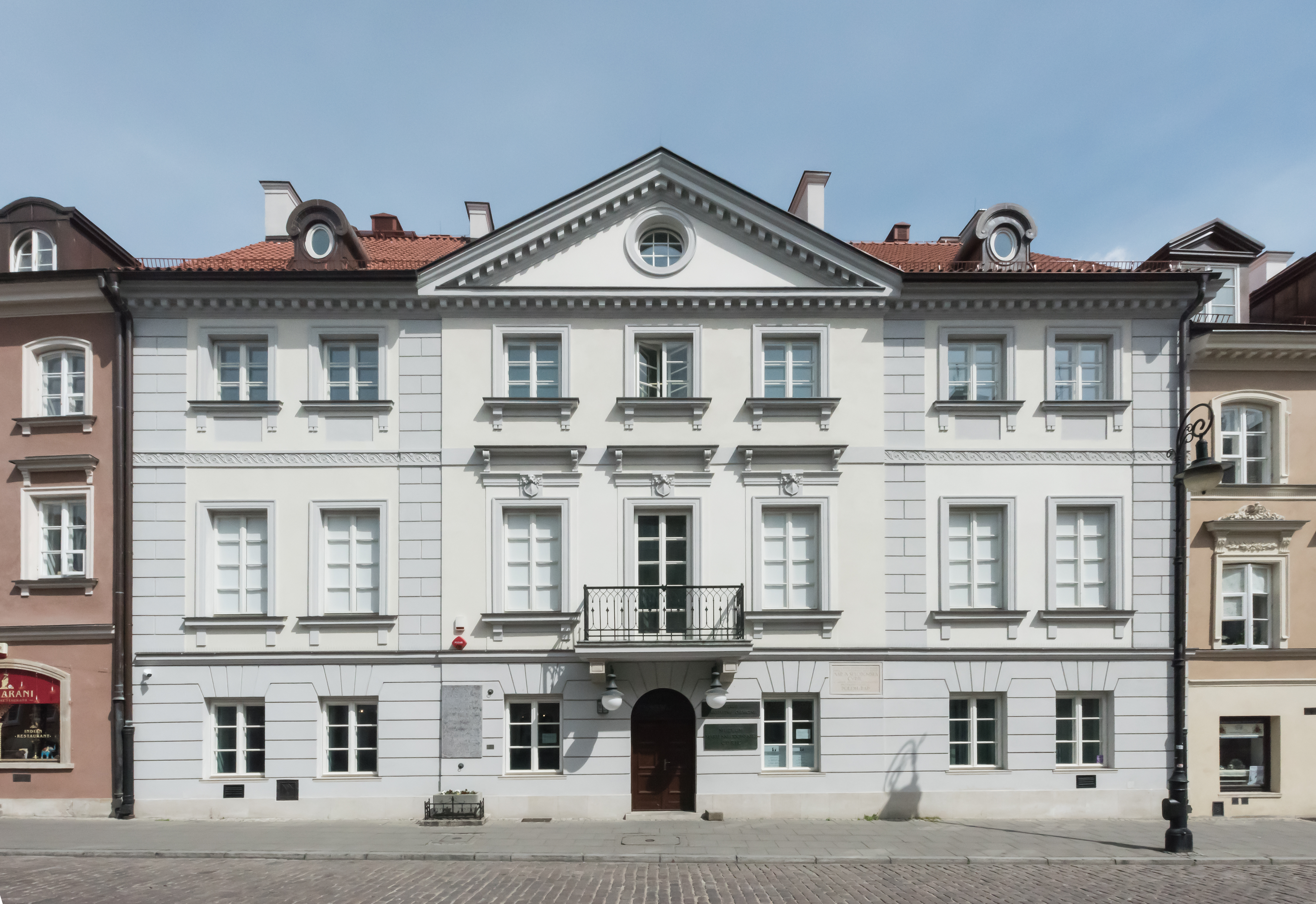
- Established: 1967
- Location: 16 Freta Street (permanent); 5 Freta Street (temporary); Warsaw, Poland
- Type: Biographical museum
- Website: Official website

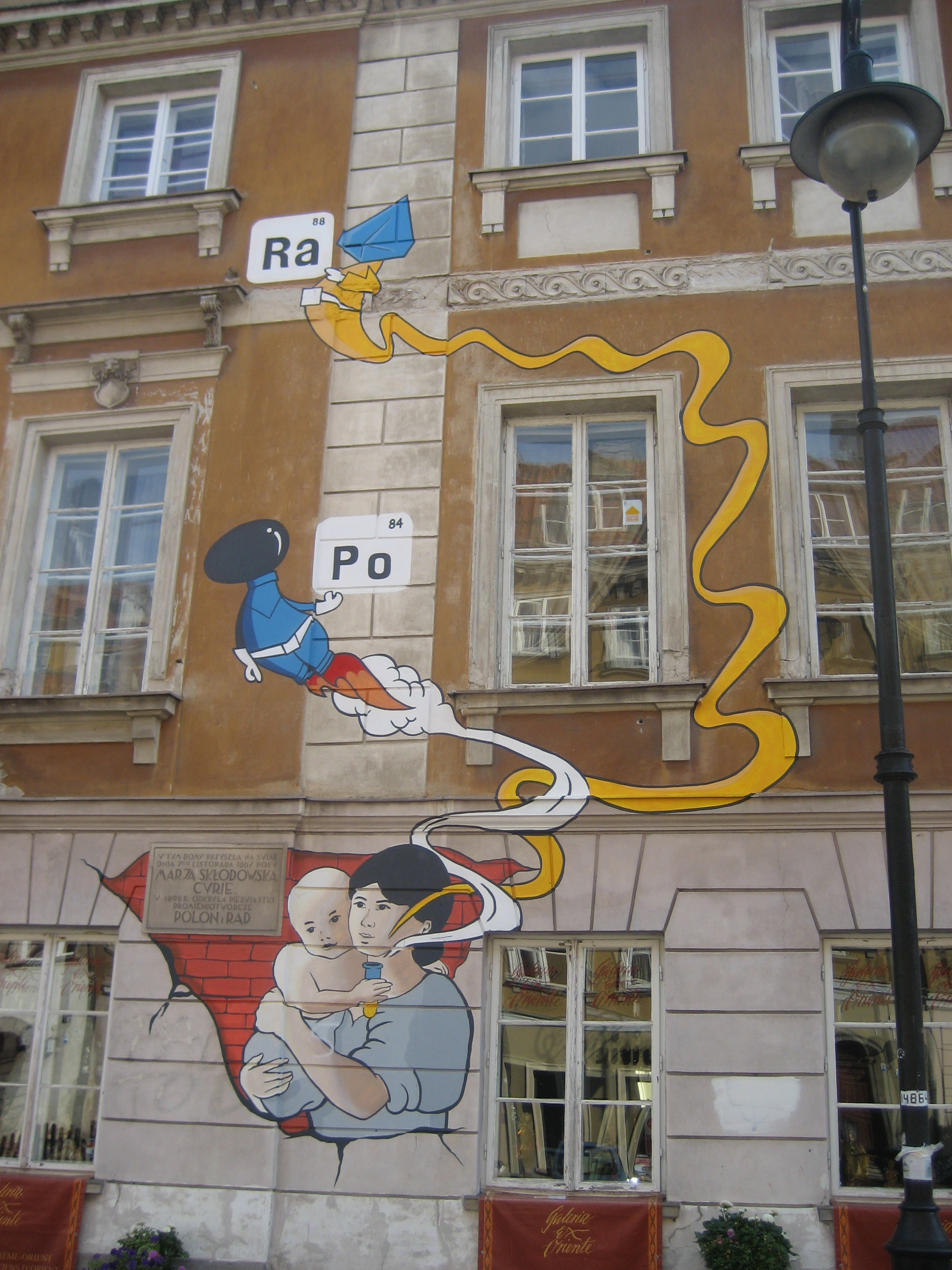
Birthplace mural, 2011 (100th anniversary of 2nd Nobel Prize): infant Maria holds test tube from which emanate the elements Maria will discover: polonium, radium.

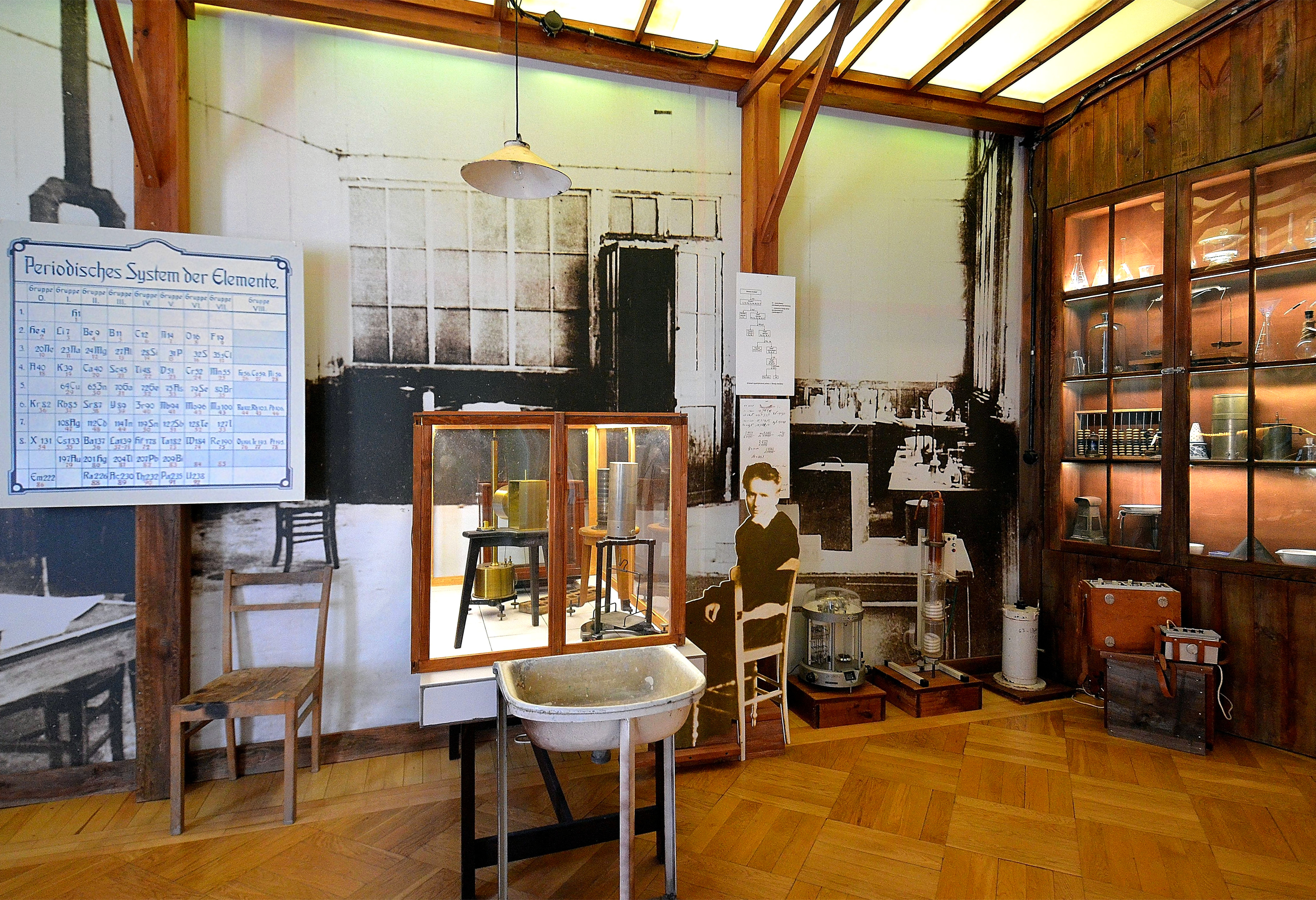
A Museum exhibition

The Maria Skłodowska-Curie Museum (Polish: Muzeum Marii Skłodowskiej-Curie) is a museum in Warsaw, Poland, devoted to the life and work of Polish double Nobel laureate Maria Skłodowska-Curie (1867–1934), who discovered the chemical elements polonium and radium.

The Maria Skłodowska-Curie Museum is a cultural institution of the city of Warsaw, co-organized with the Polish Chemical Society. It carries on educational and cultural programs related to Maria Skłodowska-Curie and her family.

The Museum stands at 16 Freta Street (ulica Freta 16) in Warsaw's "New Town" district (dating from the 15th century), and is housed in the 18th-century tenement house in which Maria Skłodowska was born.

== History ==
The Maria Skłodowska-Curie Museum was established by the Polish Chemical Society in 1967, on the centenary of the birth of physicist-chemist Maria Skłodowska-Curie. Participants in the museum's inauguration included her younger daughter and biographer, Eve Curie Labouisse; Eve's husband, the American politician and diplomat Henry Richardson Labouisse Jr.; and nine Nobel Prize winners.

The museum is housed in an 18th-century apartment building (the Łyszkiewicz apartment building) at Freta Street (Polish: ulica Freta) 16 in Warsaw's "New Town". The building has been rebuilt several times. After Maria Skłodowska-Curie's death in 1934, a plaque was attached to the building, commemorating her birth there and her epochal scientific discoveries.

During the 1944 Warsaw Uprising the building was deliberately demolished by the German forces, but the plaque survived and was put back after the building was rebuilt following World War II.

== Collections ==
The museum is biographical in character, with permanent exhibits and periodic special exhibits. The holdings include photographs, letters, documents, the scientist's personal effects, comments by Maria and her husband Pierre Curie and others about her and her work and discoveries, and films in Polish, English and French about her and about physics and chemistry.

Prominently illustrated are Skłodowska-Curie's work in France and her involvement in scientific organizations and in the founding of the Paris and Warsaw Radium Institutes.

The museum endeavors to stimulate and support the interest of scholars, students and the general public in the life and achievements of Maria Skłodowska-Curie.

The museum is open Tuesday through Sunday, and closed on Mondays and Polish national holidays.

== See also ==
- Warsaw Radium Institute
- Musée Curie
