= Ernst Fuchs (doctor) =

Austrian ophthalmologist (1851–1930)

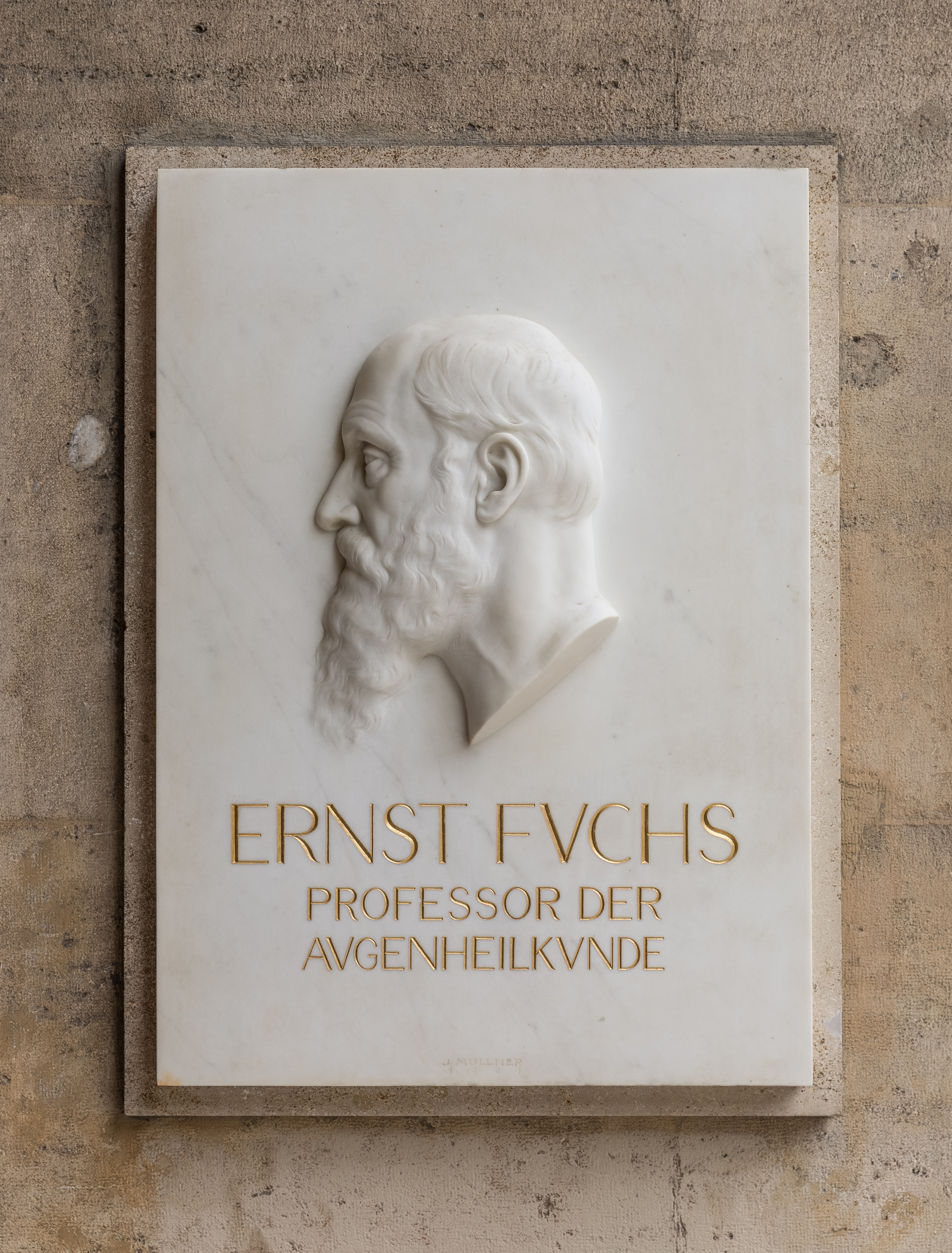
- Born: 14 June 1851; Vienna, Austria
- Died: 21 November 1930 (aged 79); Vienna, Austria
- Citizenship: Austrian
- Known for: Fuchs heterochromic iridocyclitis, Fuchs' dystrophy, Fuchs spots
- Scientific career
- Fields: medicine, ophthalmology
- Workplaces: Head of second eye clinic of Vienna at University of Vienna (1885–1915)

Ernst Fuchs (14 June 1851– 21 November 1930) was an Austrian ophthalmologist, physician and researcher.

== Overview ==
The importance of Fuchs' life achievement must surely be based on his discovery and description of numerous ocular diseases and abnormalities. As a result of more than 250 scientific publications, the name Ernst Fuchs became well known throughout the world. Although his name is commonly recognized in conjunction with various corneal and anterior segment disorders, Ernst Fuchs' contribution to ophthalmology exceeds purely the delineation of ocular diseases and the detailed description of signs. Fuchs' collection of microscopic samples laid the foundation for anatomical and pathological understanding of blood vessels, muscles, and most other tissues of the eye. Additionally, Fuchs was able to pass on his unique knowledge, educating ophthalmologists at an international level. His Textbook of Ophthalmology was, for many decades, the most extensively used reference book in the field of ophthalmology worldwide.

Fuchs' Textbook of Ophthalmology was first published in 1889. During the following 21 years, he edited 12 of the 18 English editions of the textbook himself. The Textbook of Ophthalmology was translated into numerous languages (including Japanese, Chinese, Spanish, French, Russian, and Italian). Between 1892 and 1933, 10 British and American editions were published. Later versions were edited by Maximilian Salzmann, his oldest pupil. In America as well as the Far East, the textbook was considered the bible of ophthalmology for approximately 50 years. The final edition was published in 1945 in German. Other books about normal and pathological anatomy have evolved from Fuchs' textbook.

During his period of clinical practice and education, Austria and particularly Vienna became the centre of ophthalmology worldwide. Fuchs' success was not limited to Austria, but he was known globally and his works were published in Japanese, Chinese and German languages. Fuchs also had many international patients, including the wife of Naser al-Din, the Qajar Shah of Persia and a group of his entourage, who came to Fuchs for treatment of cataracts.

== International Recognition ==
Fuchs was elected an Honorary Fellow of the Royal College of Surgeons (Edinburgh) in 1905.
