= Polish Chemical Society =

Learned society

- Polskie Towarzystwo Chemiczne
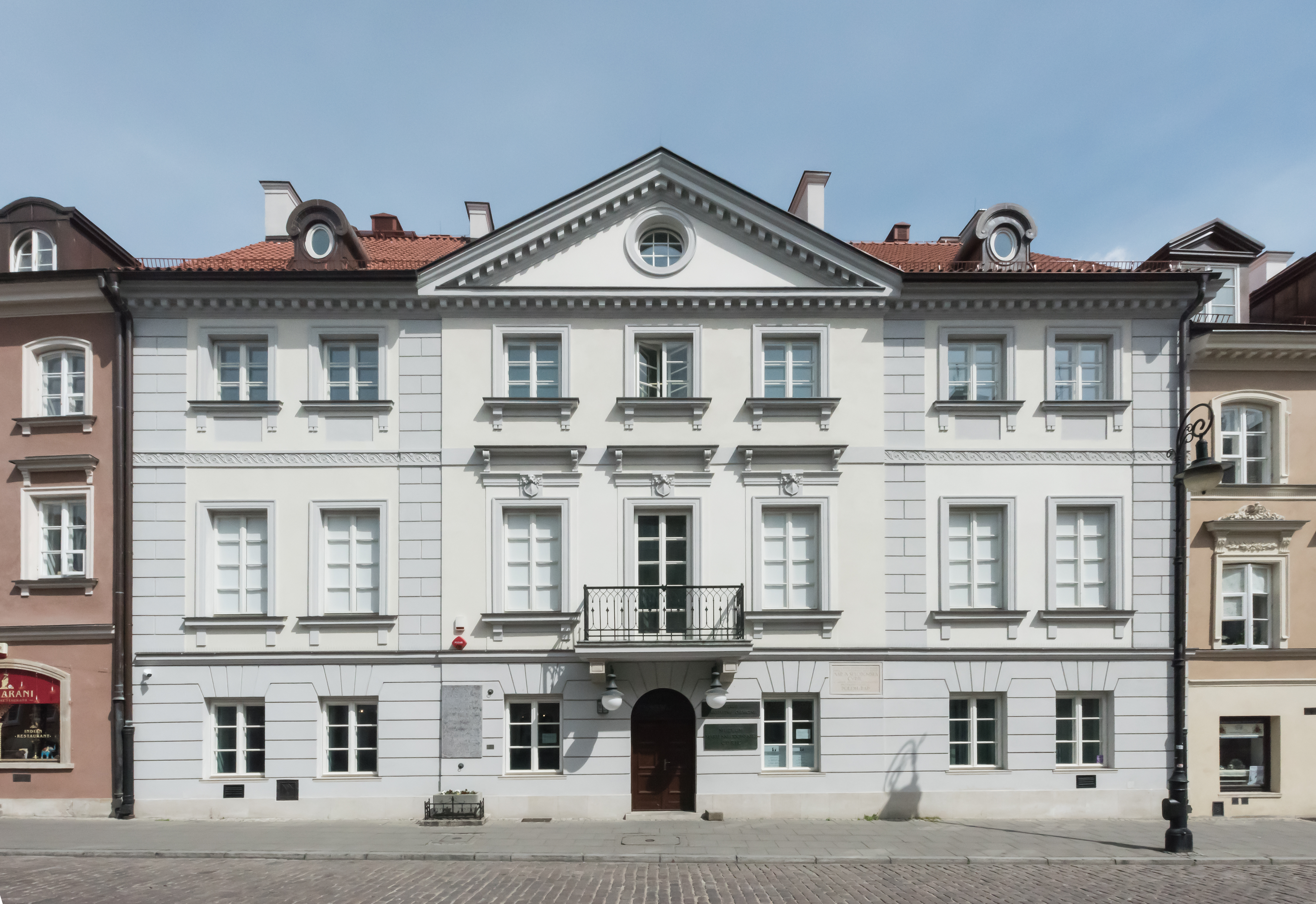
- Seat of Polish Chemical Society at ul.Freta 16 in Warsaw.
- Abbreviation: PTCHEM
- Formation: 29 June 1919; 106 years ago
- Type: Learned society
- Purpose: Research
- Headquarters: Warsaw
- Location: Poland
- Members: 1,959
- Official language: Polish
- Key people: Izabela Nowak (President)
- Website: http://ptchem.pl/pl

The Polish Chemical Society (Polish: Polskie Towarzystwo Chemiczne, PTCHem) is a professional learned society of Polish chemists founded in 1919 to represent the interests of Polish chemists on the local, national and international levels.

== History ==
The society was founded of 118 Charter Members on 29 June 1919 on the initiative of Leon Marchlewski, Stanisław Bądzyński and Ignacy Mościcki, future President of Poland who was a chemist himself. The initial aim of the organization was to bring together Polish chemists previously working under different partitions as well as from abroad. It was founded in three Polish cities: Lwów (today Lviv in Ukraine), Kraków, and Warsaw and the first scientific meeting was organized in Warsaw on 1 November 1919 by the executive board of the society.

The Polish Chemical Society initiated a series of scientific conferences as well as founded Poland's first chemistry journal Roczniki Chemii.

After the Second World War, the society was reactivated in 1946 and continues its activities until today. It has 1,959 members, who work in 20 regional centres. In 2006, the Polish Chemical Society became a public benefit organization.

The statute states that one of the goals of the society is ‘‘the encouragement of progress of chemical science and propagation thereof among the public, as well as representation of the professional interests of chemists, both researchers and those industrially employed’’.

Currently, the offices of the society are located in the 18th-century tenement building at Freta Street 16 in the historic city center of Warsaw. The building is the birthplace of Marie Curie and also houses the Maria Skłodowska-Curie Museum (MMSC).

== Awards of the Polish Chemical Society ==
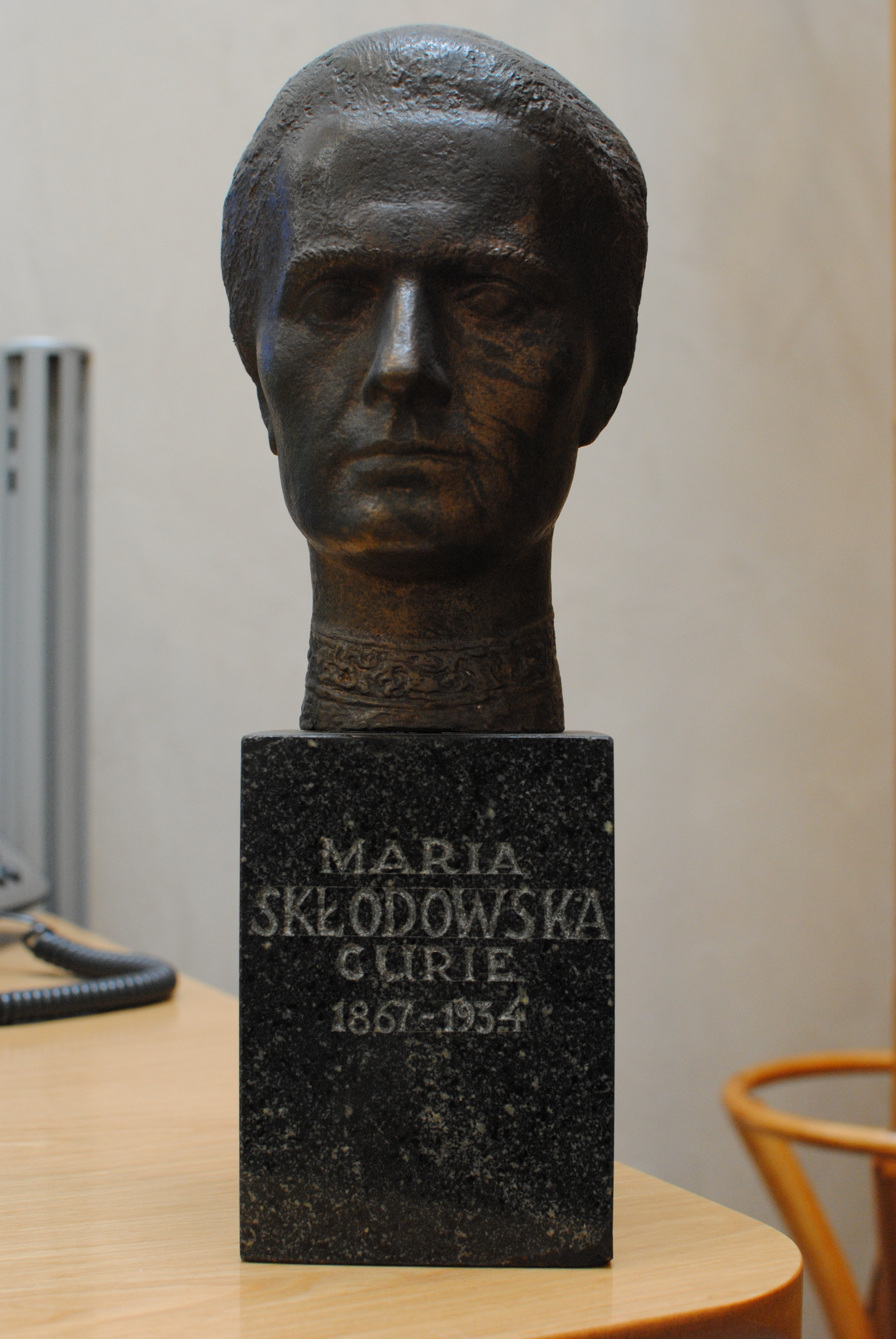
Bronze bust of Marie Curie, on green marble stand. Presented by the Polish Chemical Society to the Royal Institute of Chemistry on the latter's centenary in 1977. Now in the Royal Society of Chemistry's HQ at Burlington House, London. Gold lettering on the stand reads "Maria Skłodowska Curie 1867-1934".

The society confers the following awards:

- Jędrzej Śniadecki Medal – the highest distinction presented by the society for outstanding achievements in chemistry (first awarded in 1965)
- Marie Curie Medal – an award presented to chemists working abroad (first awarded in 1996)
- Kołos Medal – an award presented for outstanding achievements in theoretical chemistry and physical chemistry (first awarded in 1998)
- Wiktor Kemula Medal – an award presented jointly with the Polish Academy of Sciences for significant contributions in analytical chemistry (first awarded in 1998)
- Stanisław Kostanecki Medal – an award presented for achievements in organic chemistry (first awarded in 1978)
- Jan Zawidzki Medal – an award presented for achievements in physical chemistry and inorganic chemistry (first awarded in 1979)
- Ignacy Mościcki Medal – an award presented for achievements in industrial chemistry (first awarded in 2000)
- Jan Harabaszewski Medal – an award presented for didactic achievements in popularizing the field of chemistry (first awarded in 1990)
- Zofia Matysikowa Medal – an award presented for best teachers of chemistry
- Bogusława and Włodzimierz Trzebiatowski Medal – an award for achievements in inorganic chemistry
- Anton Amann Medal – an award to recognise outstanding achievements in breath-related research

== Honorary members ==
Currently there are 148 honorary members of the society including:

- Henry Louis Le Chatelier
- Paul Sabatier
- Marie Curie
- Józef Boguski
- Ignacy Mościcki
- Henry Edward Armstrong
- Bohuslav Brauner
- Victor Grignard
- Hans von Euler-Chelpin
- Leon Marchlewski
- Jaroslav Heyrovsky
- Kazimierz Fajans
- S. P. L. Sørensen
- Leopold Ružička
- Ilya Prigogine
- Theodor Svedberg
- Max Bodenstein
- Richard Kuhn
- Irving Langmuir
- Robert Robinson
- Roger Adams
- Ronald G.W. Norrish
- Krishnasami Venkataraman
- Alan R. Katritzky
- Rolf Huisgen

== See also ==
- European Chemical Society
- Polish Physical Society
- Polish Mathematical Society
