= Fuchs spot =

Degeneration of the macula

- Other names: Forster-Fuchs' retinal spot
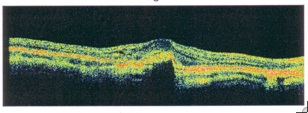
- An optical coherence tomography (OCT) of the retina, showing a Fuchs spot

The Fuchs spot (also known as Förster-Fuchs' Spot) is a degeneration of the macula in cases of high myopia. It is named after the two persons who first described it: Ernst Fuchs, who described a pigmented lesion in 1901, and Forster, who described subretinal neovascularization in 1862. It occurs due to proliferation of retinal pigment epithelium associated with choroidal hemorrhage. The size of the spots are proportionate to the severity of the pathological myopia.

== Symptoms and signs ==
First signs of a Fuchs spot are distorted sight of straight lines near the fovea, which some days later turn to the typical well-circumscribed patches after absorption of haemorrhage, and a pigmented scar remains. As in macular degeneration, central sight is affected. Atrophy leads to the loss of two or more lines of the Snellen chart.

== Treatment ==
Fuchs spots are caused by regression of choroidal neovascularization. Since it is a medical sign, treatment is given for the actual cause. Photothermal laser ablation, photodynamic therapy, anti-VEGF therapy, or a combination of these are the treatment options of choroidal neovascularization due to pathological myopia.
