= Maciej Łyszkiewicz Tenement =

Coordinates: 52°15′5″N 21°0′31″E

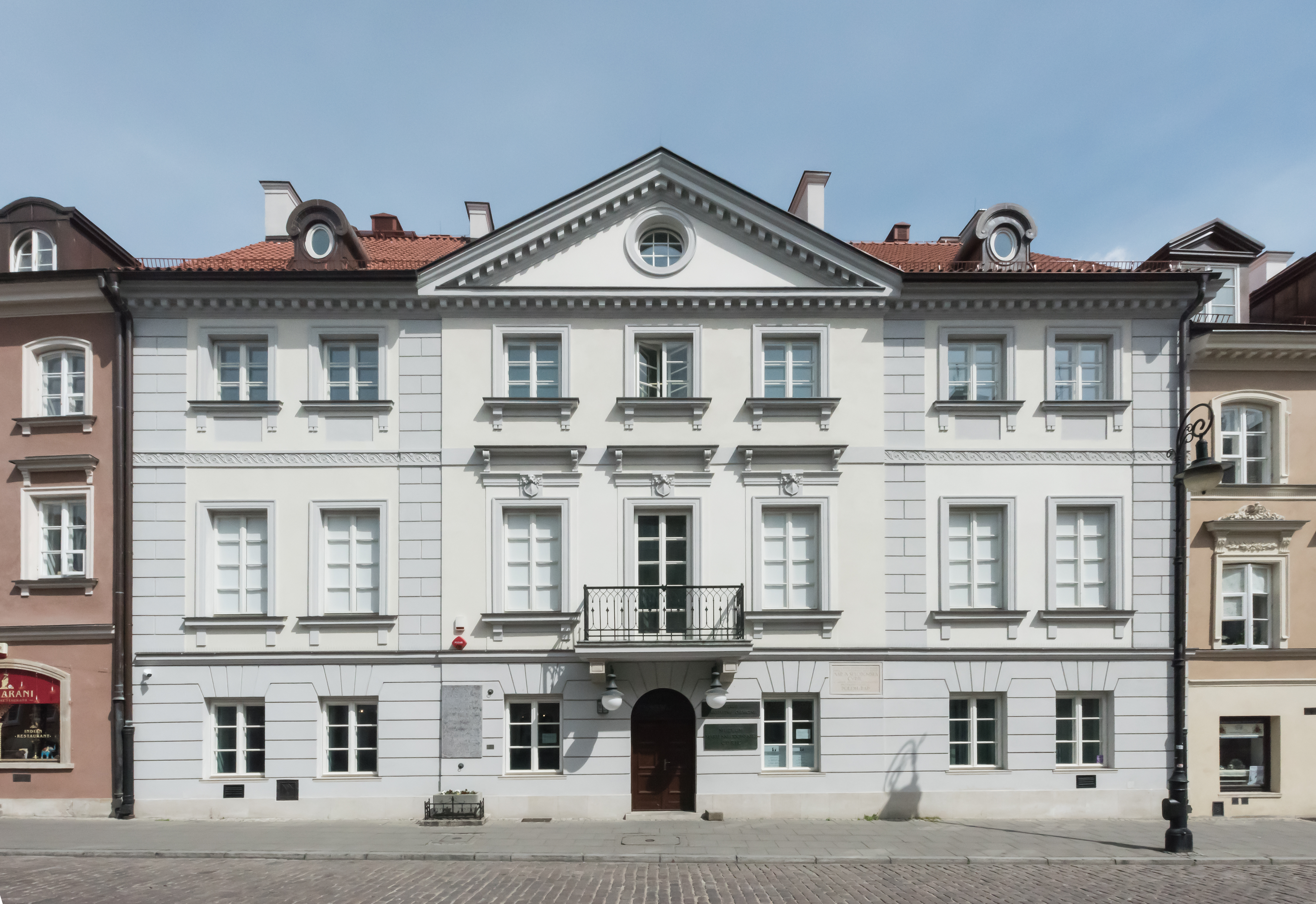
- Established: 1967
- Location: Freta 16; Warsaw, Poland
- Type: museum
- Website: muzeum-msc.pl

Historic Monument of Poland
- Designated: 1994-09-08
- Part of: Warsaw – historic city center with the Royal Route and Wilanów
- Reference no.: M.P. 1994 nr 50 poz. 423

Kamienica Łyszkiewicza w Warszawie (the Łyszkiewicz apartment building) is a museum (birthplace of Maria Skłodowska Curie), established 1967, in the Warsaw New Town district, Poland.
