= Rudolph Emmerich =

German bacteriologist (1856–1914)

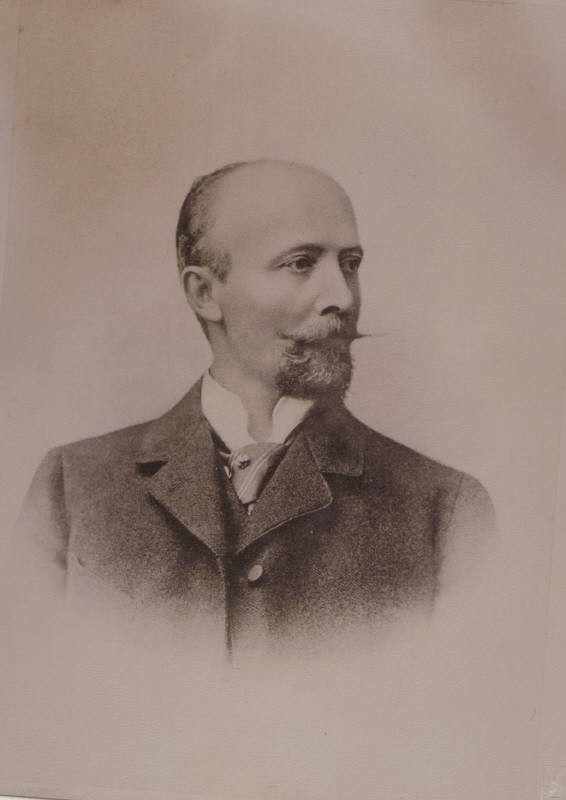
Emmerich, c. 1900

Rudolph (or Rudolf) Emmerich (29 September 1856 – 15 November 1914) was a German bacteriologist noted for his advances against cholera and his co-invention of the first antibiotic drug Pyocyanase with Oscar Löw in the 1890s. Emmerich performed experiments on himself via injections of cholera strains and proved that cholera is less virulent when contracted from human to human as opposed to from the ground. Emmerich was a professor of Hygiene and Bacteriology at the Ludwig-Maximilians-Universität München.
