= Museum of Industry and Agriculture =

Coordinates: 52°14′45″N 21°0′51″E

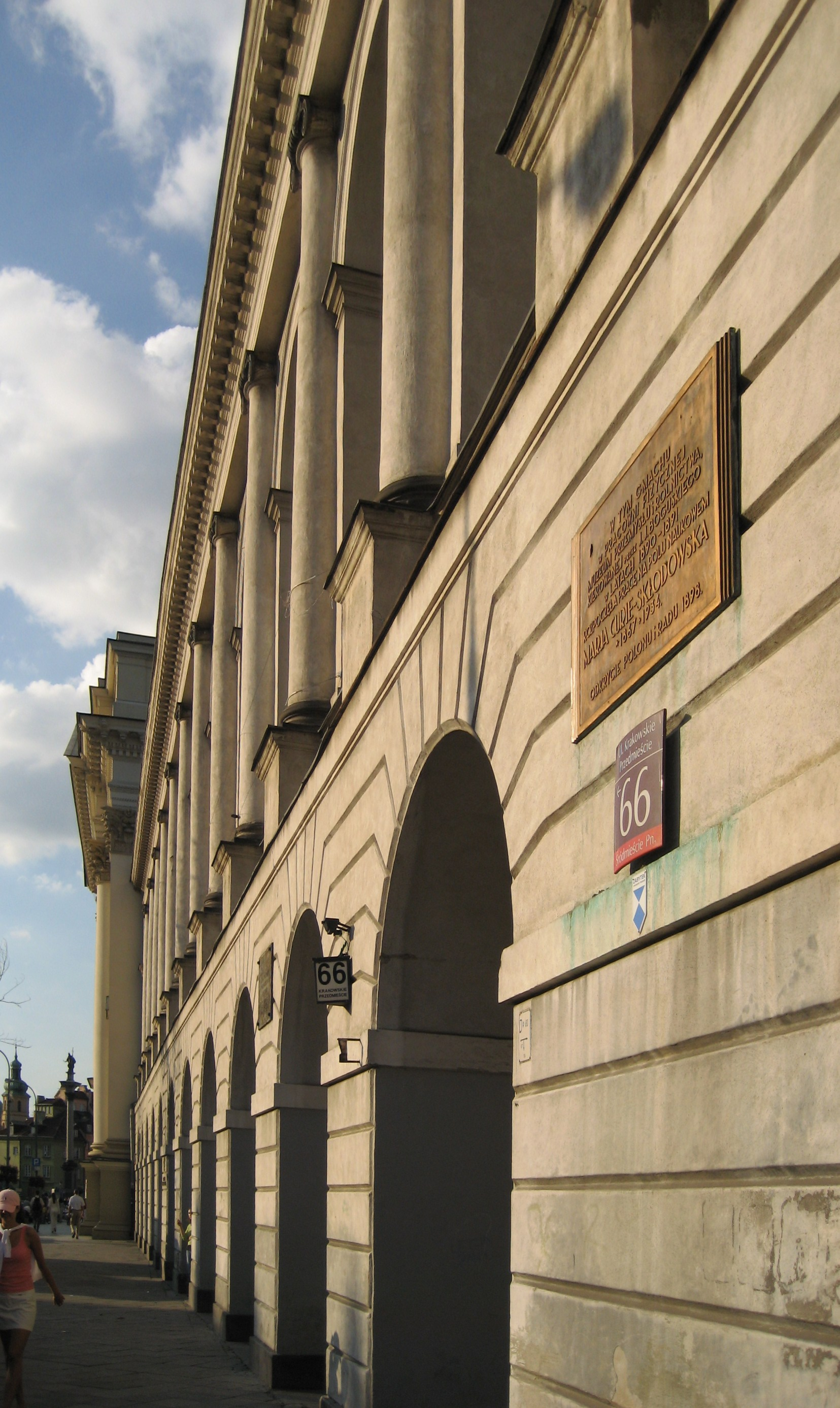
Museum of Industry and Agriculture, on Warsaw's Krakowskie Przedmieście

The Museum of Industry and Agriculture (Polish: Muzeum Przemysłu i Rolnictwa) is a former museum of technology and agriculture at 66, Krakowskie Przedmieście in Warsaw, Poland.

== History ==
It was founded in 1866 on the initiative of Jan Tadeusz Lubomirski and was chartered on June 5 1875. Among its notable co-founders were philanthropists count Feliks Sobański, Józef Zamoyski, Karol Dittrich and Hipolit Wawelberg, the Polish-Jewish banker. From 1881 it was located on Krakowskie Przedmieście in a former guardhouse and Bernardine monastery. It contained archives of the history of Polish industry, agriculture and crafts. It ran temporary exhibitions and opened permanently to the public in 1905 but was destroyed in 1939 during World War II.

It housed a physics laboratory run by Józef Boguski where the future double Nobel laureate, Marie Curie, began her scientific career in 1890–91.

After World War II, the work of the Museum was divided among three other institutions:

- The Museum of Industrial History in Opatówek
- The National Museum of Agriculture in Szreniawa
- Warsaw University of Life Sciences
