= Maximilian Salzmann =

Austrian ophthalmologist (1862–1954)

Maximilian Salzmann (9 December 1862, in Vienna – 17 April 1954, in Graz) was an Austrian ophthalmologist.

In 1887 he received his medical doctorate from the University of Vienna, where he later worked as an assistant to Ernst Fuchs at the eye hospital. In 1906 he became an associate professor, then in 1911 was appointed professor of ophthalmology at the University of Graz. In 1918/19 he served as dean to the faculty of medicine.

He is credited for introducing the goniolens into ophthalmology (1914), and is remembered for his pioneer research of the iridocorneal angle, an angle of the anterior chamber of the eye. His name is associated with a corneal disorder known as Salzmann's nodular dystrophy.

== Published works ==
He was the author of a popular work on the anatomy and histology of the eye, Anatomie und Histologie des menschlichen Augapfels im Normalzustande, that was translated into English and published as The anatomy and histology of the human eyeball in the normal state, its development and senescence. He published the 13th to the 15th editions of Fuchs' Lehrbuch der Augenheilkunde (1921–26), and his revision of Eduard Jäger von Jaxtthal's atlas of ophthalmoscopy was translated into English as Ophthalmoscopical Atlas (1890). Other noted works by Salzmann are:

- Die Zonula ciliaris und ihr Verhältnis zur Umgebung, 1900 – The ciliary zonule and its relationship to its surroundings.
- Über eine eigentümliche Form von Hornhautentzündung, 1916 – On a peculiar form of corneal inflammation.
- Über eine Abart der knötchenförmigen Hornhautdystrophie, 1925 – On a variety of tuberous corneal dystrophy.
- Glaukom und netzhautzirkulation, 1933 – Glaucoma and retinal circulation.
