= Wawelberg =

Polish banking family

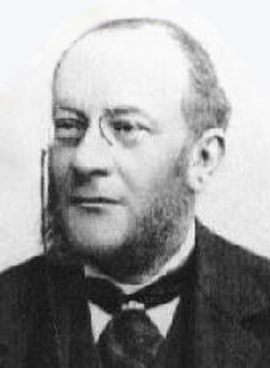
Hyppolite Wawelberg

The Wawelbergs were a Polish Jewish family whose banking house was active in both Congress Poland and the Russian Empire.

== Hyppolite Wawelberg ==
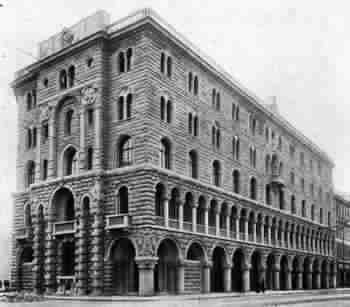
Wawelberg Bank building, St. Petersburg

The Russian branch was founded by Hyppolite Wawelberg (1843–1901). The first Wawelberg Bank had its origins in a loan office that began operating in the early 1840s. In 1869 young Hyppolite Wawelberg moved to St. Petersburg where he launched a new venture, the Wawelberg Bank. Hyppolite Wawelberg's Polish-Jewish connections (Wawelbergs were Jewish) remained strong, and the bank was generally known as having two separate centers - in Warsaw and in St. Petersburg. The first location of Wawelberg Bank was 25 Nevsky Prospekt in St. Petersburg (House of the Parish of Our Lady of Kazan Cathedral, now housing Stockmann department store and SAS - Scandinavian Airlines System offices). Hyppolite Wawelberg made a fortune in Russia though he was equally well known as a generous philanthropist.

The new Polish Kingdom (Polish: Królestwo Polskie; Russian: Korolevstvo Polskoe), as created by the Congress of Vienna, was a Polish entity but was in personal dynastic union with Imperial Russia, since the reigning Romanov Tsar was also king of Poland. Though based in St. Petersburg, the Wawelbergs were instrumental to the development of finance in the Polish Kingdom. They were to Congress Poland what the Medicis were to Florence, the Fuggers to Augsburg, the Rothschilds to France, and the Mellons to the late-19th-century United States.

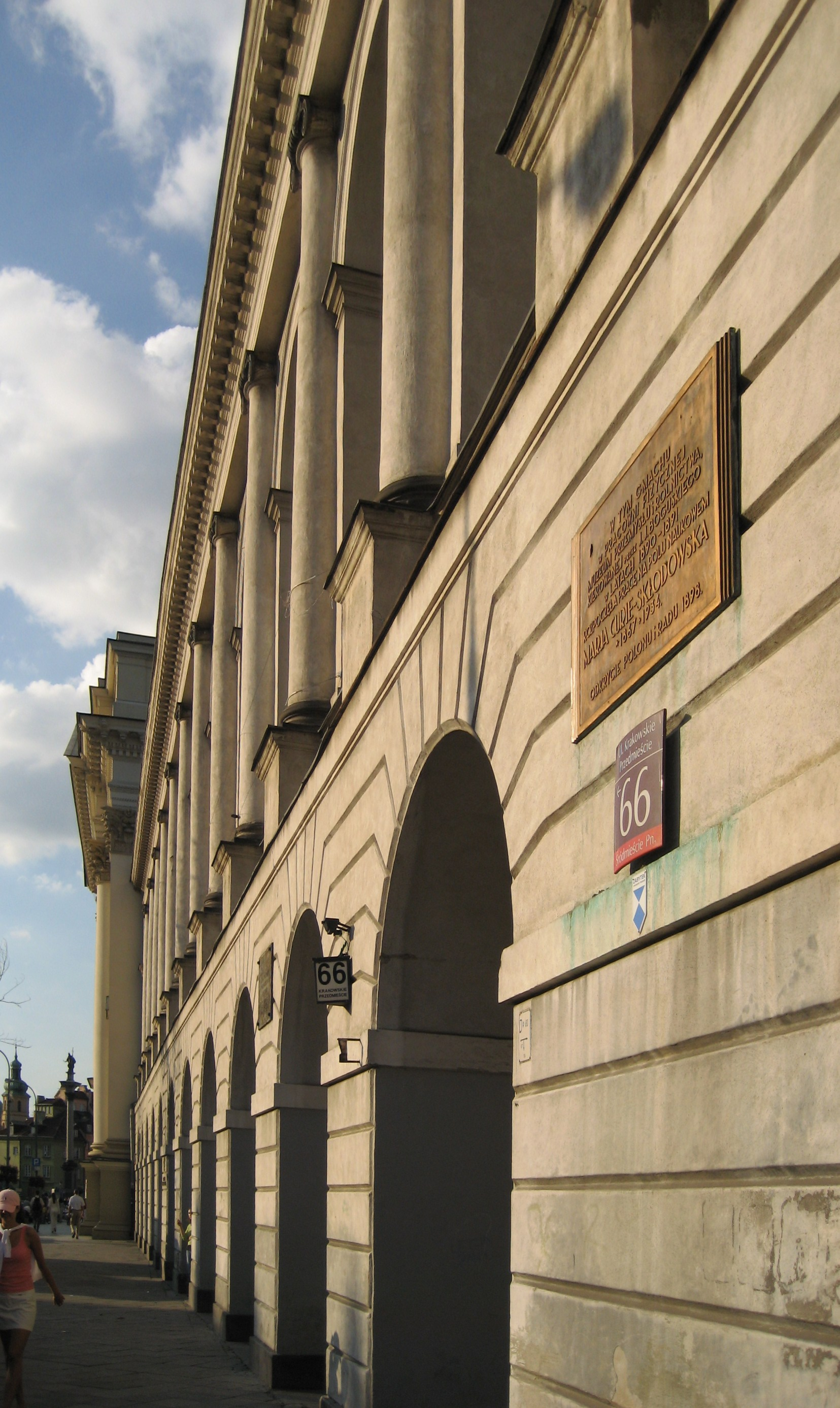
Museum of Industry and Agriculture, Warsaw

By 1900 Hyppolite Wawelberg was at the helm of the Wawelberg Bank and held the title of honorable citizen of St. Petersburg, an appellation that could be passed on like a title of nobility. He was also a member of the management board of the Warsaw Bank of Commerce (Bank Handlowy w Warszawie). Back in St. Petersburg he was a member of the treasury of the Jewish Colonist Society, honorable member of the Jewish Educational Society (Общество распространения просвещения среди евреев) and benefactor of the Roman Catholic Beneficial Society (Римско-католического благотворительное общества).

In 1875, in Warsaw, Poland, Hyppolite Wawelberg co-founded the Museum of Industry and Agriculture (Muzeum Przemysłu i Rolnictwa w Warszawie). It was in a physics laboratory there that, in 1890–91, Maria Skłodowska (Marie Curie), future investigator of radioactivity and future double Nobel laureate, did her first scientific work.

In 1895 Hyppolite Wawelberg founded the Warsaw Mechanical-Technical School with his faithful friend and collaborator, Stanislav Rotwand (Cтанислав Ротванд, Stanisław Rotwand), an 1860 alumnus of the University of Saint Petersburg law school.

== Michael Wawelberg ==
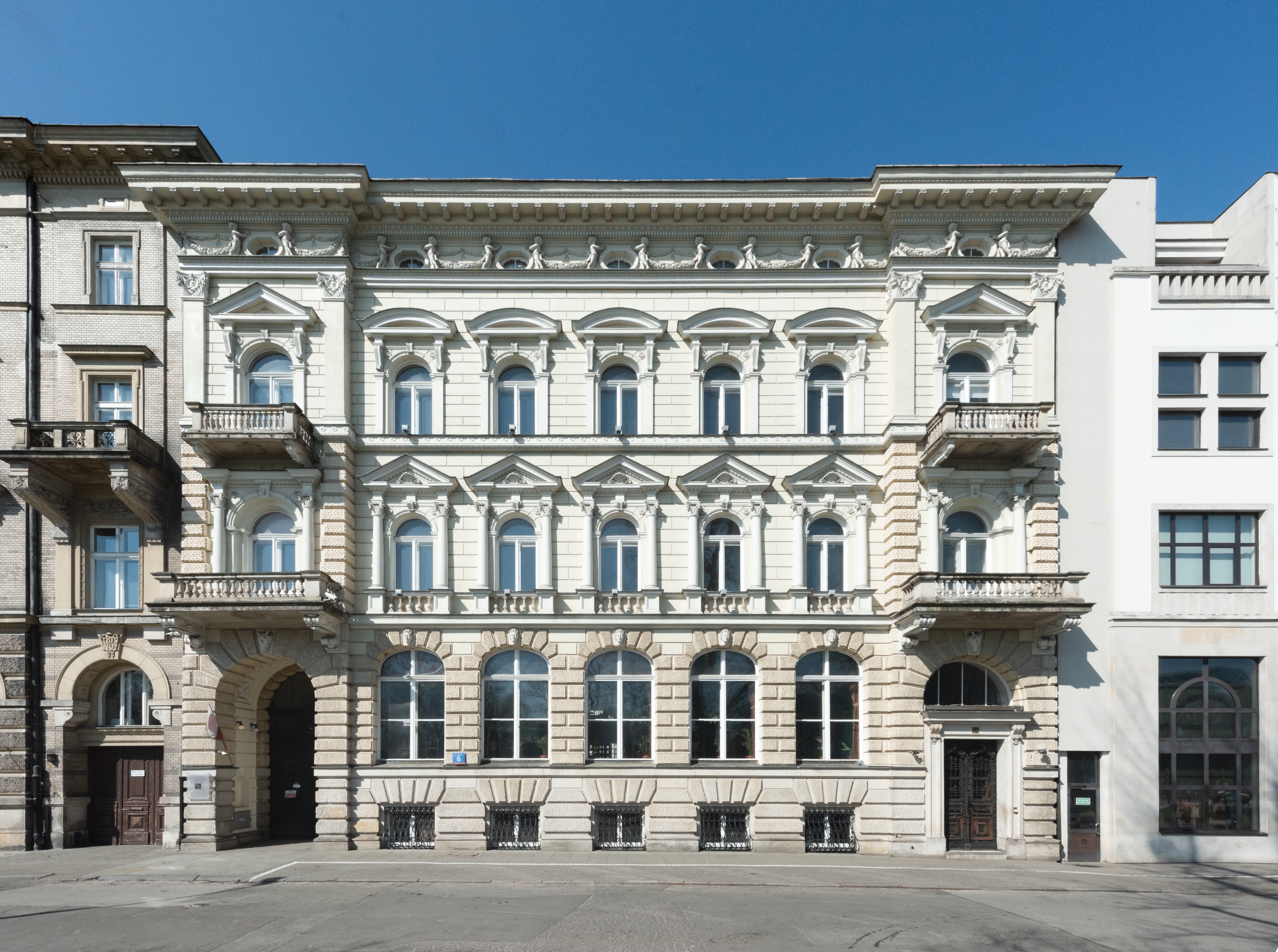
Warsaw building

Michael Wawelberg (Михаил Ипполитович Вавельберг; 1880 – after 1929) received a classical educational at the St. Nicholas Imperial Gymnasium in Tsarskoe Selo (Царскосельская Императорская Николаевская гимназия), from which he graduated in 1899. His father Hyppolite Wawelberg donated 500 roubles for the gymnasium's own charity, which at the time was a considerable sum of money.

in 1903 Michael Wawelberg graduated from the University of St. Petersburg law school. That year he also took over the management of the Wawelberg Bank, which in 1912 was renamed the St. Petersburg Commercial Bank (Петербургский Торговый банк). In 1913 a branch was founded in Poland and became a publicly traded company – the Western Bank (Bank Zachodni) in Poland). The Wawelbergs later lost control of it due to Russian Bolshevik-induced turmoil.

In 1910 the St. Petersburg Commercial Bank purchased a building with a lot underneath it in one most prestigious locations, at the corner of Nevsky Prospekt and aristocratic Malaia Morskaia ulitsa (7 and 9 Nevsky Prospekt). The bank announced an open competition for the building's design. The competition was won by young Russian architect Marian Peretiatkovich (Peretyatkovich).

Naom Sindalovskii quotes a telling local St. Petersburg legend about building's construction. According to the legend after the building was constructed and the client (Michael Wawelberg) inspected it and could not find any deficiency with the work, he ordered to change the doors anyway because the door sign said "push." That's not what I do in life, said Wawelberg, I only pull things toward myself.

In 1917, on the eve of the Bolshevik putsch, Michael Wawelberg lived in Tsarskoye Selo at 66 Boulvardnaia ulitsa (66 Boulevard Street; ул. Бульварая, 66; Soviet name: Октябрьский бульвар, Oktiabr'skii Boulevard). He was the chairman of the Commercial Bank and director of the board of Donetsk and Grushev Coal and Anthracite Mines (директор правления Донецко-Грушевского акционерного общества каменно-угольных и антрацитовых копий).

He fled Russia after 1917 and then disappears from the public view. Most likely he settled in Poland or spent some time there, because in Andrei Serkov's book on Russian Free Masonry he mentions that two free masons, Alexander Erdman and Michael Wawelberg (М. И. Вавельберг), as they considered themselves Russian, petitioned Grand Master of the Polish Lodge with a request to allow them to found the Russian Lodge in Warsaw.

In St. Petersburg the Wawelbergs are best remembered because of the Wawelberg Bank building still popularly known as the House of Wawelberg (Дом Вавельберга) at 7/9 Nevsky Prospekt.

== See also ==
- List of Poles
