= Musée Curie =

Museum in Paris, France

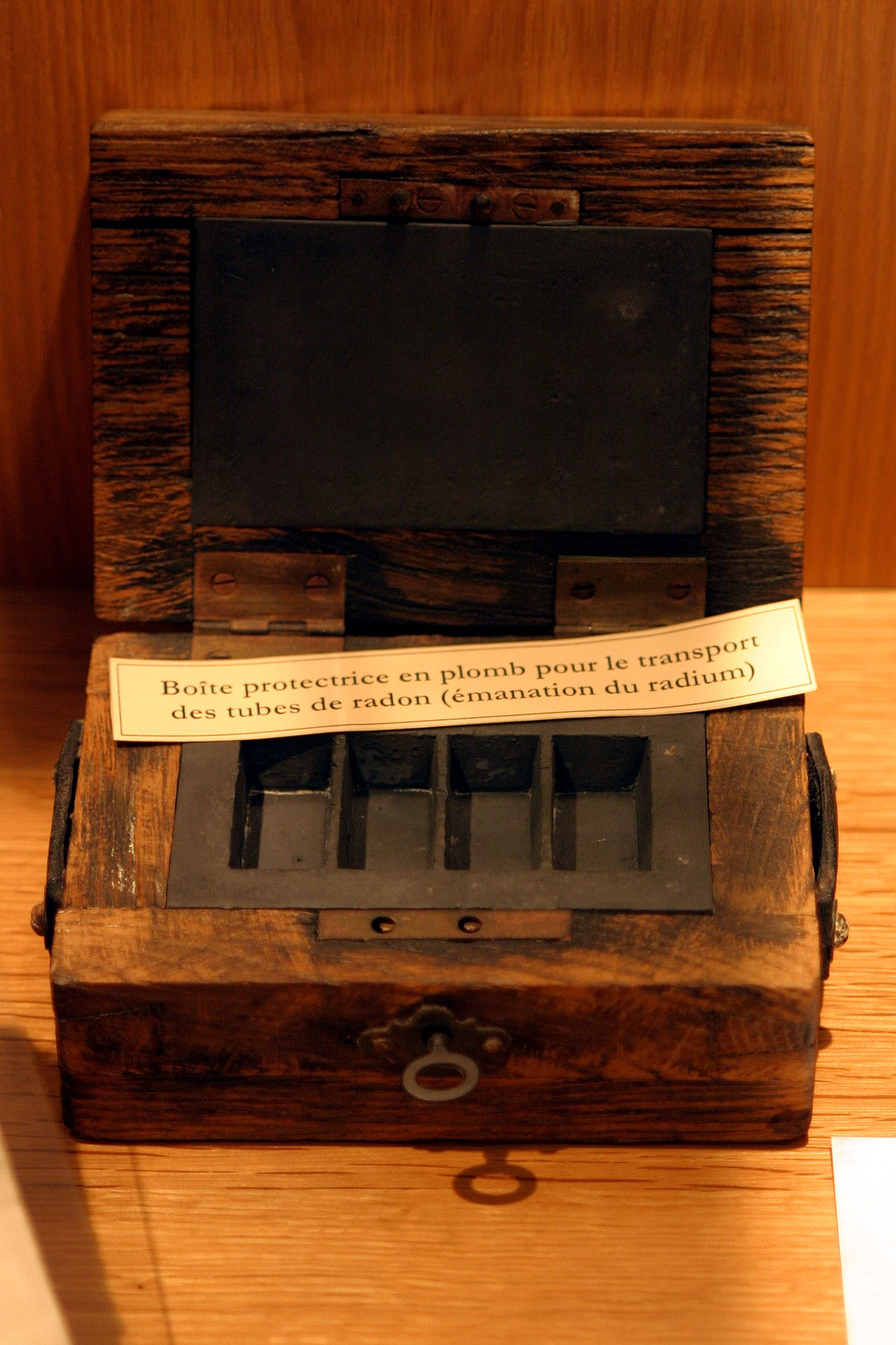
An exhibit in the Musée Curie

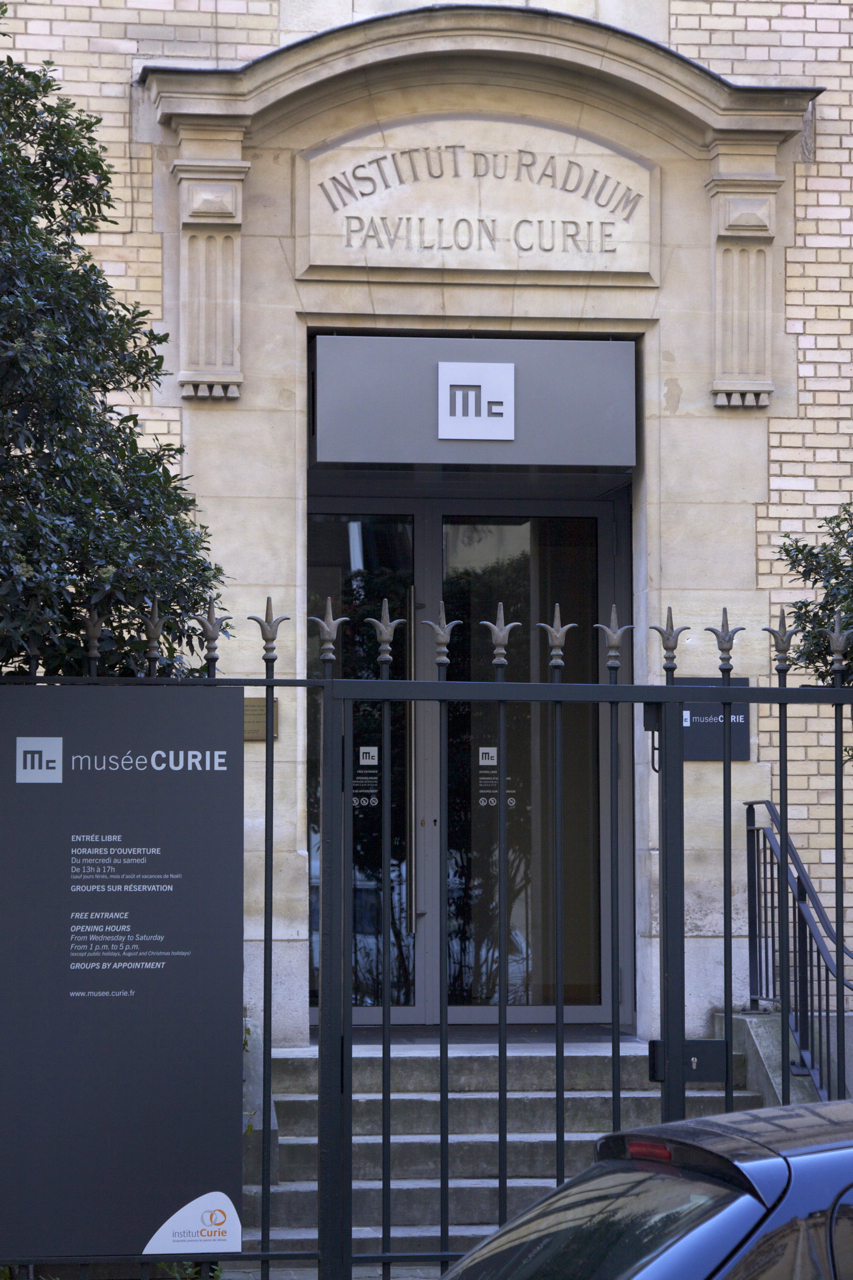
Entrance to the Musée Curie

The Musée Curie (French pronunciation: [myze kyʁi], Curie Museum) is a historical museum focusing on radiological research. It is located in the 5th arrondissement at 1, rue Pierre et Marie Curie, Paris, France, and open Wednesday to Saturday, from 1pm to 5pm; admission is free. The museum was renovated in 2012, thanks to a donation from Ève Curie.

== History ==
In 1914, the laboratory was directed by Marie Curie. The museum was established in 1934, after Curie's death, on the ground floor of the Curie Pavilion of the Institut du Radium. It was formerly Marie Curie's laboratory, built 1911–1914, and where she performed research from 1914 to 1934. In this laboratory her daughter and son-in-law Irène and Frédéric Joliot-Curie discovered artificial radioactivity, for which they received the 1935 Nobel Prize for Chemistry. Irène Joliot-Curie died in 1956, Frédéric Joliot-Curie in 1958. The office and the laboratory are closed to be kept as a place of memory. In 1964, during the thirtieth anniversary of the discovery of artificial radioactivity, display cases were set up to present some of the devices used until the 1930s. In 1967, for the centenary of the birth of Marie Curie, her office and her personal chemistry laboratory were presented to privileged visitors. In 1981, due to the increase in visits, Marie Curie's chemistry laboratory was decontaminated and then reconstituted. This work was subsidised by the French League Against Cancer. In 1995, on the occasion of the seventy-fifth anniversary of the Fondation Curie, the transfer of the ashes of Pierre and Marie Curie to the Panthéon, and in anticipation of the hundredth anniversary of the discovery of natural radioactivity, the exhibition room of instruments is renovated and extended. In 2007, the legacy of Marie Curie's daughter, Ève Curie, enabled the renovation of the Curie museum, completed in September 2012.

== Exposition ==
The museum contains a permanent historical exhibition on radioactivity and its applications, notably in medicine, focusing primarily on the Curies, and displays some of the most important research apparatus used before 1940. It also contains a centre for historical resource which holds archives, photographs, and documentation on the Curies, Joliot-Curies, the Institut Curie, and the history of radioactivity and oncology.

== See also ==
- List of museums in Paris
- Maria Skłodowska-Curie Museum
