= Quantum logic clock =

Type of clock with laser-cooled single ions

A quantum clock is a type of atomic clock with laser cooled single ions confined together in an electromagnetic ion trap. Developed in 2010 by physicists at the U.S. National Institute of Standards and Technology, the clock was 37 times more precise than the then-existing international standard. The quantum logic clock is based on an aluminium spectroscopy ion with a logic atom.

Both the aluminum-based quantum clock and the mercury-based optical atomic clock track time by the ion vibration at an optical frequency using a UV laser, that is 100,000 times higher than the microwave frequencies used in NIST-F1 and other similar time standards around the world. Quantum clocks like this are able to be far more precise than microwave standards.

== Accuracy ==
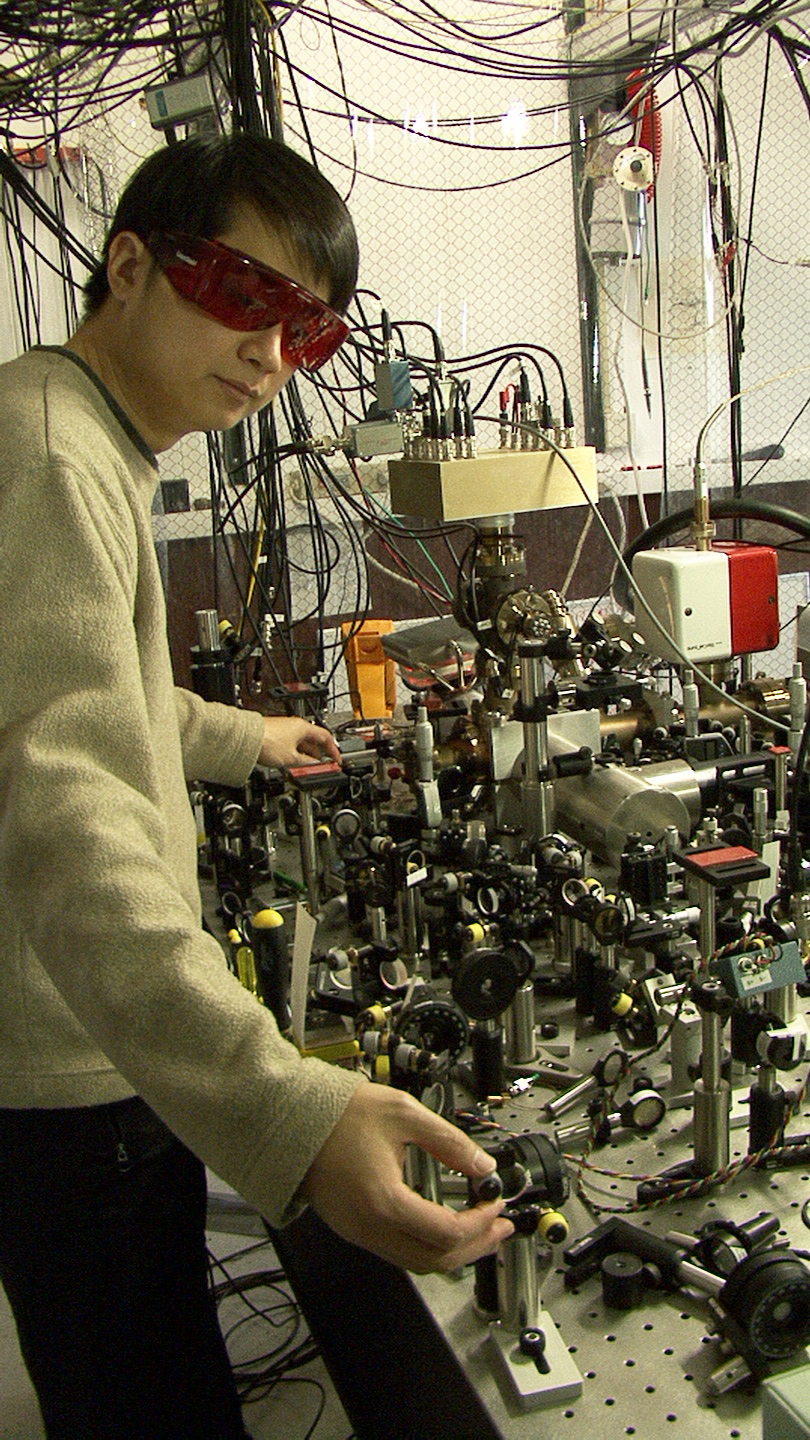
A NIST 2010 quantum logic clock based on a single aluminum ion

The NIST team are not able to measure clock ticks per second because the definition of a second is based on the standard NIST-F1, which cannot measure a machine more precise than itself. However, the aluminum ion clock's measured frequency to the current standard is 1121015393207857.4(7) Hz. NIST have attributed the clock's accuracy to the fact that it is insensitive to background magnetic and electric fields, and unaffected by temperature.

In March 2008, physicists at NIST described an experimental quantum logic clock based on individual ions of beryllium and aluminum. This clock was compared to NIST's mercury ion clock. These were the most accurate clocks that had been constructed, with neither clock gaining nor losing time at a rate that would exceed a second in over a billion years.

In February 2010, NIST physicists described a second, enhanced version of the quantum logic clock based on individual ions of magnesium and aluminium. Considered the world's most precise clock in 2010 with a fractional frequency inaccuracy of 8.6 × 10^{−18}, it offers more than twice the precision of the original. In terms of standard deviation, the quantum logic clock deviates one second every 3.68 billion years, while the then current international standard NIST-F1 Caesium fountain atomic clock uncertainty was about 3.1 × 10^{−16} expected to neither gain nor lose a second in more than 100 million years. In July 2019, NIST scientists demonstrated such a clock with total uncertainty of 9.4 × 10^{−19} (deviates one second every 33.7 billion years), which is the first demonstration of a clock with uncertainty below 10^{−18}.

== Quantum time dilation ==
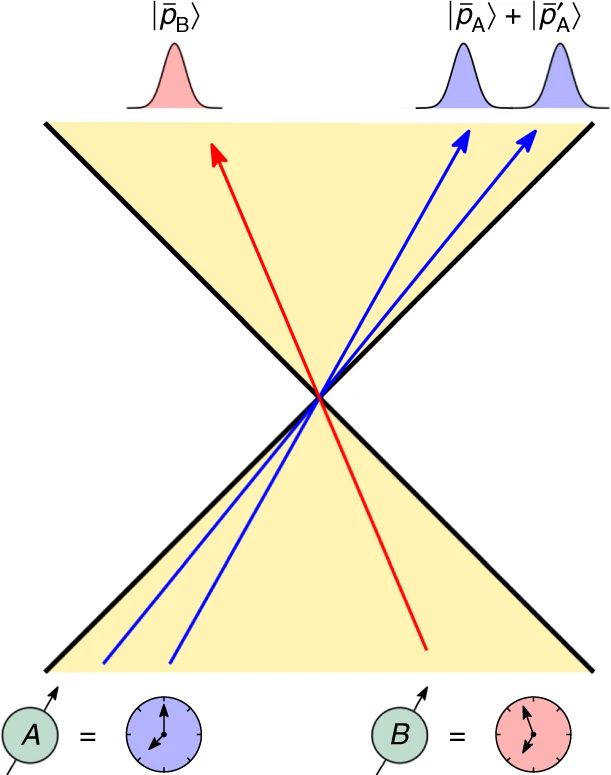
"Two clocks are depicted as moving in Minkowski space. Clock B is moving in a localized momentum wave packet with average momentum p_{B}, while clock A is moving in a superposition of localized momentum wave packets with average momentum p_{A} and p0_{A}. Clock A experiences a quantum contribution to the time dilation it observes relative to clock B due to its nonclassical state of motion."

In a 2020 paper scientists illustrated that and how quantum clocks could experience a possibly experimentally testable superposition of proper times via time dilation of the theory of relativity by which time passes slower for one object in relation to another object when the former moves at a higher velocity. In "quantum time dilation" one of the two clocks moves in a superposition of two localized momentum wave packets, therefore exists a possibility, that both clocks experience superposition of proper times. That in the context of relativistic clock interferometry is resulting in a change to the classical time dilation.

== Other accurate experimental clocks ==
The accuracy of quantum-logic clocks was briefly superseded by optical lattice clocks based on strontium-87 and ytterbium-171 until 2019. An experimental optical lattice clock was described in a 2014 Nature paper. In 2015 JILA evaluated the absolute frequency uncertainty of their latest strontium-87 429 THz (429228004229873.0 Hz) optical lattice clock at 2.1 × 10^{−18}, which corresponds to a measurable gravitational time dilation for an elevation change of 2 cm (0.79 in) on planet Earth that according to JILA/NIST Fellow Jun Ye is "getting really close to being useful for relativistic geodesy". At this frequency uncertainty, this JILA optical lattice optical clock is expected to neither gain nor lose a second in more than 15 billion years.

== See also ==
- Atomic clock
