= Dick effect =

Effect that limits performance of advanced atomic clocks

The Dick effect (hereinafter referred to as "the effect") is an important limitation to frequency stability for modern atomic clocks such as atomic fountains and optical lattice clocks. It is an aliasing effect: High frequency noise in a required local oscillator (LO) is aliased (heterodyned) to near zero frequency by a periodic interrogation process that locks the frequency of the LO to that of the atoms. The noise mimics and adds to the clock's inherent statistical instability, which is determined by the number of atoms or photons available. In so doing, the effect degrades the stability of the atomic clock and places new and stringent demands on LO performance.

For any given interrogation protocol, the effect can be calculated using a quantum-mechanical sensitivity function, together with the spectral properties of the LO noise. This calculational methodology, introduced by G. John Dick, is now widely used in the design of advanced microwave and optical frequency standards, as well as in the development of methodologies for atomic-wave interferometry, frequency standard comparison, and other areas of measurement science.

== Background ==
=== General ===
==== Frequency stability ====
The frequency stability of an atomic clock is usually characterized by the Allan deviation $\sigma_y(\tau)$, a measure of the expected statistical variation of fractional frequency as a function of averaging time $\tau$. Generally, short-term fluctuations (frequency or phase noise) in the clock output require averaging for an extended period of time in order to achieve high performance.

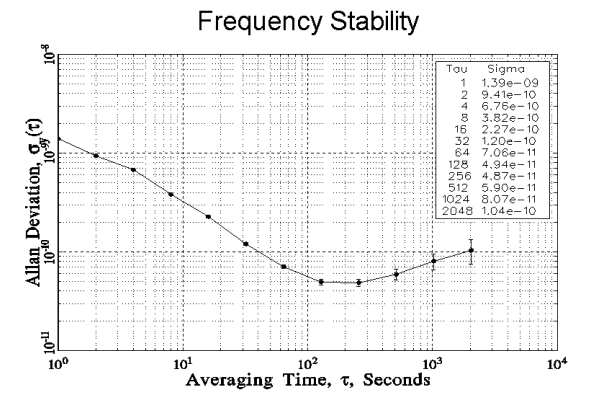
Allan deviation for a commercial atomic clock

This stability is not the same as the accuracy of the clock, which estimates the expected difference of the average frequency from some absolute standard.

Excellent frequency stability is crucial to a clock's usability: Even though it might have excellent accuracy, a clock with poor frequency stability may require averaging for a week or more for a single high precision test or comparison. Such a clock would not be as useful as one with a higher stability; one that could accomplish the test in hours instead of days.

==== Stability and operation of atomic clocks ====
Instability in the output from an atomic clock due to imperfect feedback between atoms and LO was previously well understood. This instability is of a short-term nature and typically does not impact the utility of the clock. The effect, on the other hand gives rise to frequency noise which has the same character as (and is typically much larger than) that due to the fundamental photon– or atom–counting limitation for atomic clocks.

With the exception of hydrogen and ammonia (hydrogen maser, ammonia maser), the atoms or ions in atomic clocks do not provide a usable output signal. Instead, an electronic or optical local oscillator (LO) provides the required output. The LO typically provides excellent short-term stability; long-term stability being achieved by correcting its frequency variability by feedback from the atoms.

In advanced frequency standards the atomic interrogation process is usually sequential in nature: After state-preparation, the atoms' internal clocks are allowed to oscillate in the presence of a signal from the LO for a period of time. At the end of this period, the atoms are interrogated by an optical signal to determine whether (and how much) the state has changed. This information is used to correct the frequency of the LO. Repeated again and again, this enables continuous operation with stability much higher than that of the LO itself. In fact, such feedback was previously thought to allow the stability of the LO output to approach the statistical limit for the atoms for long measuring times.

==== The effect ====
The effect is an additional source of instability that disrupts this happy picture. It arises from an interaction between phase noise in the LO and periodic variations in feedback gain that result from the interrogation procedure. The temporal variations in feedback gain alias (or heterodyne) LO noise at frequencies associated with the interrogation period to near zero frequency, and this results in an instability (Allan deviation) that improves only slowly with increasing measuring time. The increased instability limits the utility of the atomic clock and results in stringent requirements on performance (and associated expense) for the required LO: Not only must it provide excellent stability (so that its output can be improved by feedback to the ultra-high stability of the atoms); it must now also have excellent (low) phase noise.

A simple, but incomplete, analysis of the effect may be found by observing that any variation in LO frequency or phase during a dead time required to prepare atoms for the next interrogation is completely undetected, and so will not be corrected. However, this approach does not take into account the quantum-mechanical response of the atoms while they are exposed to pulses of signal from the LO. This is an additional time-dependent response, calculated in analysis of the effect by means of a sensitivity function.

=== Quantitative ===
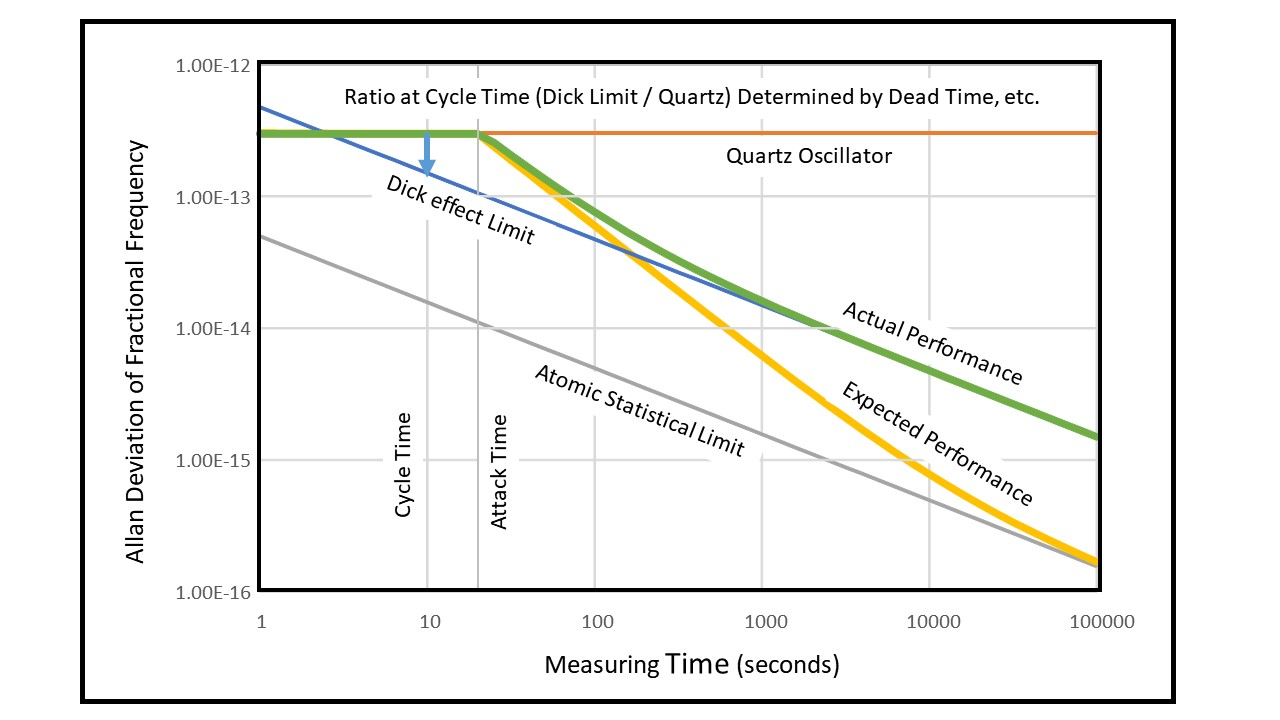
Impact of the Dick effect on the frequency stability of an Hg Ion Clock

The graphs here show predictions of the effect for a trapped-ion frequency standard using a quartz LO. In addition to excellent stability, quartz oscillators have very well defined noise characteristics: Their frequency fluctuations are characterized as flicker frequency over a very wide range of frequency and time. Flicker frequency noise corresponds to a constant Allan deviation as shown for the quartz LO in the graphs here.

The "expected" curve on the plot shows how stability of the LO is improved by feedback from the atoms. As measuring time is increased (for times longer than an attack time) the stability steadily increases, approaching the inherent stability of the atoms for times longer than about 10,000 seconds. The "actual" curve shows how the stability is impacted by the effect. Instead of approaching the inherent stability of the atoms, the stability of the LO output now approaches a line with a much higher value. The slope of this line is identical to that of the atomic limitation (minus one half on a log-log plot) with a value that is comparable to that of the LO, measured at the cycle time, as indicated by the small blue (downwards) arrow. The value (the length of the blue arrow) depends on the details of the atomic interrogation protocol, and can be calculated using the sensitivity function methodology.

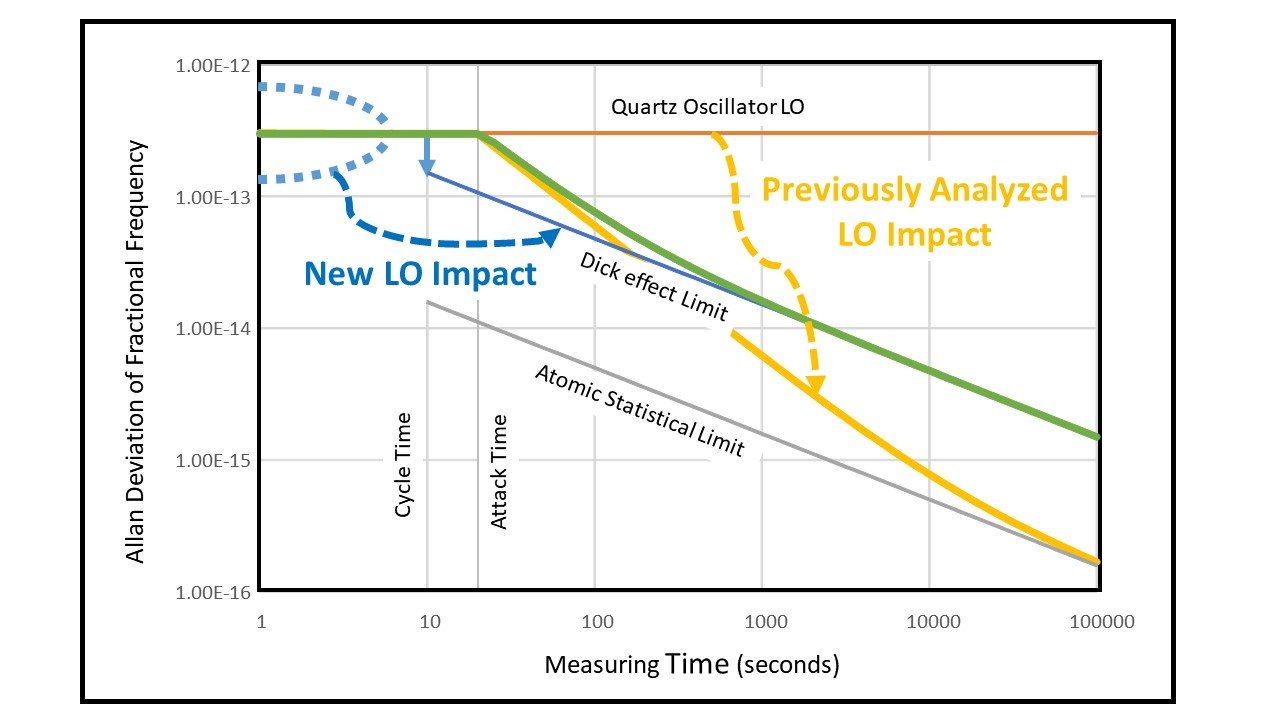
Surprisingly, the long-term stability of an atomic Clock depends on the short-term stability of the LO due to the Dick effect

The second graph here indicates how various performance aspects of the LO impact achievable stability for the atomic clock. The dependence labeled "Previously Analyzed LO Impact" shows the stability improving on that of the LO with an approximately $1 / \tau$ dependence for times longer than an "attack time" for the feedback loop. For increasing values of the measuring time $\tau$, the stability approaches the limiting $1 / \sqrt{\tau}$ dependence due to statistical variation in the numbers of atoms and photons available for each measurement.

The effect, on the other hand, causes the available stability of the frequency standard to show a counter-intuitive dependence on high-frequency LO phase noise. Here stability of the LO at times less than the Cycle Time is shown to influence stability of the atomic standard over its entire range of operation. Furthermore, it often prevents the clock from ever approaching the stability inherent in the atomic system.

=== History ===
Within a few years of the publication of two papers laying out an analysis of LO aliasing, the methodology was experimentally verified, generally adopted by the Time and Frequency community, and applied to the design of many advanced frequency standards. It was also clarified by Lemonde et al. (1998) with a derivation of the sensitivity function that used a more conventional quantum-mechanical approach, and was generalized by Santarelli et al. (1996) so as to apply to interrogation protocols without even time symmetry.

Where performance limits for atomic clocks were previously characterized by accuracy and by the photon– or atom–counting limitation to stability, the effect was now a third part of the picture. This early stage culminated in 1998 in the publication of four papers in a Special Issue on the Dick effect for the journal IEEE Transactions on Ultrasonics, Ferroelectrics, and Frequency Control.

== Impact ==
Perhaps the most significant consequence of the Dick analysis is due to its presentation of a mathematical framework that enabled researchers to accurately calculate the effect based on the methodology and technology used for many very different atomic clocks. Since the effect is generally the most significant limitation to stability for advanced frequency standards, a great deal of work since that time has focused on amelioration strategies. Additionally, the effect methodology and the sensitivity function have enabled significant progress in a number of technical areas.

- The value for the limiting instability due to the effect is determined by the interrogation protocol combined with phase noise properties of the LO. Consequences of the theory have been worked out for several different kinds of atomic clocks.
- Laboratories working on microwave Atomic fountain clocks have turned to cryogenic or optical LO techniques to replace the quartz ultrastable oscillator (USO) previously used as a reference for microwave atomic frequency standards. While the instability of the quartz USO could be reduced by feedback to effectively realize the inherent atomic stability in a clock, its phase noise, transformed by the effect, was now the primary source of the clock's instability, as shown by the graph in the previous section. Cryogenic and optical techniques can provide both the stability and phase noise required to realize the inherent stability of the atomic standard. These atomic clocks typically operate by tossing a ball of laser-cooled atoms upward through a microwave cavity that acts to start the clock in each individual atom. As the atoms return downward, they again traverse this same cavity where they receive a second microwave pulse that stops their clocks. The ball then falls through an optical interrogation apparatus below the cavity that "reads out" the phase difference between the microwaves (the LO) and the atoms that developed during their flying time. This is repeated again and again; a sequential process that gives rise to the effect.

On a smaller scale, the stability of Rb vapor clocks using a pulsed optically pumped (POP) technique has improved to such an extent that the effect due to a quartz USO LO has become the limiting performance factor. Developments in a combined USO--DRO (dielectric resonator oscillator) LO technology now enable improved performance.

- Optical clocks have achieved the highest stability of any clocks, and are on track to replace Cesium fountain clocks as the definition of the second. However, as (Katori, 2011) states: "In optical lattice clocks, however, owing to the significantly low QPN (quantum projection noise), the Dick effect becomes the major obstacle in achieving higher stability". Analysis of the effect and its consequence as applied to optical standards has been treated in a major review (Ludlow, et al., 2015) that lamented "the pernicious influence of the Dick effect", and in several other papers.
- The timing for two complete atomic systems (while using only one LO) can be interleaved, thus eliminating the dead time associated with atomic state preparation and detection. This substantially reduces the effect, and could possibly eliminate it. The efficacy of his approach was verified by Biedermann et al. in an experiment with a deliberately degraded LO Subsequently, this approach has been applied by Shioppo et al. to achieve the highest stability to date for any clock in tests using two laser-cooled Yb optical standards, and, on a much smaller scale, in a Rb vapor microwave clock. It has been proposed that zero dead time might be accomplished in a single fountain by use of a juggling protocol. A theoretical paper also proposes to use not only two complete atomic systems, but to add a third (again with a single LO) to not only eliminate the effect but also to reduce the otherwise limiting stability due to photon– or atom–counting effects.
- An alternative that can eliminate the effect is a continuously operating fountain. Such a clock has been demonstrated, enabled by the development of a source of laser-cooled atoms with continuous flow. This clock uses a different configuration from the usual fountain in order to physically separate the rising atoms from the falling ones. This is achieved by angling the launch direction away from vertical; the atoms' internal clocks are started in one microwave cavity; then stopped in a second one after executing a parabolic arc. The second cavity, together with a second laser interrogation system, are laterally displaced from the launch system and cavity.
- The microwave or optical signals used to start and stop the atoms' internal clocks typically have a rectangular time dependence. Shaped pulses can reduce the effect by eliminating discontinuities in the slope of the sensitivity function that result from a sudden turn on and turn off of the electromagnetic signal. This, in turn, reduces sensitivity to the high-frequency components of LO phase noise, and so reduces the effect. Additionally, when applied to multiple clocks with interleaved timing, properly shaped pulses could eliminate the effect entirely.
- Compare frequency standards.
- Atomic clocks have been used and proposed for applications in space, both for applications that require only performance already available from earth-based technology and those that would require performance only available from a clock operating in space. A good example is the PHARAO laser-cooled Cs atomic frequency standard which has been delivered to the European Space Agency for incorporation into the ACES multiple-clock physics payload, and is scheduled to be launched to the ISS. A significant part of the performance advantage for space-based clocks is due to a reduction of the effect; this due to the longer interrogation times and higher duty factors available when the atomic clock is operated in zero G.
- Atom interferometry with applications as an atomic gravimeter, and for gravitational wave detection.

== Methodology ==
=== Introduction ===
Modern atomic frequency standards or clocks typically comprise a local oscillator (LO), an atomic system that is periodically interrogated by the LO, and a feedback loop to correct the frequency errors in the LO based on the results of that interrogation; thus locking the frequency of the LO to that of the atomic system. The effect describes a process that makes for imperfect locking, one that depends on details of the atomic interrogation protocol. Two steps are required in order to calculate this newly recognized impact of LO noise on the frequency stability of the locked local oscillator (LLO) that provides useful output for the frequency standard. These are:

- Calculation of the instantaneous sensitivity to LO phase fluctuations for the atomic system over the course of the interrogation. This is expressed as a sensitivity function $g(t)$, evaluated over the cycle time, and which has a value of zero during parts of the cycle where housekeeping tasks are underway, and (e.g.) a value of unity between the interrogation pulses associated with Ramsey Interrogation.

In contrast to other examples of photonic excitation of atoms or ions, this excitation process is a slow business, taking milliseconds or even seconds to accomplish on account of the extremely high Q factors involved. Instead of a photon striking a solid and ejecting an electron, here is a process where a coherent EM field consisting of many photons (slowly) drives each atom or ion in a cloud from their ground state into a mixed state, typically one with equal amplitudes in the ground and excited states.
Functional forms for $g(t)$ during the time that the atoms are being exposed to interrogating microwave or optical fields can be calculated using a fictitious spin model for the quantum mechanical state-transition process or by using an algebraic approach. These forms, in combination with constant values (typically zero or unity) during times when no signal is applied, allow the sensitivity function to be well defined over the entire interrogation cycle. The discriminating power for both Ramsey Interrogation and Rabi Interrogation of atomic systems had been previously calculated, based on the quantum-mechanical response of an atom or ion to a slightly detuned drive signal. These previously calculated values are now seen to correspond to a time average of the sensitivity function $\overline{g(t)}$, taken over the interrogation cycle.

- Calculation of the limiting stability for an atomic clock due to the effect. Given the sensitivity function $g(t)$ and the frequency noise spectrum $S_y^{LO}(f)$ of the LO, the limiting stability of the clock can now be calculated. Analysis of an equivalent feedback model shows that variations in loop gain, due to the time variation of $g(t)$, give rise to uncorrected slow variations in the LO, even with perfect (noise free) feedback from the atoms. Being periodic, the frequency spectrum of $g(t)$ is discrete, with harmonics at frequencies that are integer multiples $n$ of the inverse of the cycle time, as $f_n=n/{t_c}$. Each of these harmonics aliases LO noise nearby to near zero frequency, adding to the White frequency noise $S_y^{LLO}(0)$ of the locked local oscillator that provides the output signal for the clock. This additional noise is of the same sort as that which is due to photon– or atom–counting in an atomic clock and so degrades its performance.

=== Calculation of the sensitivity function ===
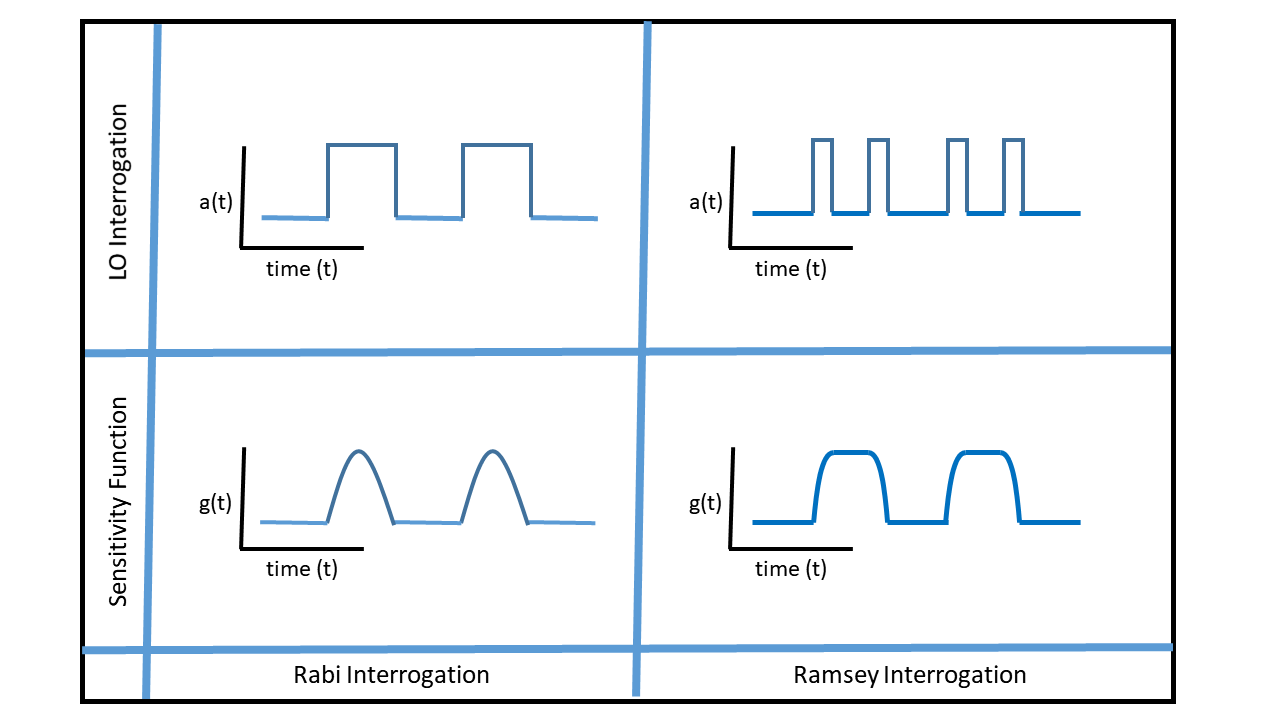
Excitation amplitude $a(t)$ and sensitivity function $g(t)$ sequences for Atomic Clocks with Rabi and Ramsey interrogation protocols. Rabi interrogation uses a single signal pulse, offset in frequency so that its phase varies smoothly as the pulse progresses. Ramsey interrogation uses two short pulses with a $\pi/2$ phase shift between them. Two interrogations are shown in each box, along with three dead times (during which readout, state preparation, and other housekeeping tasks are performed).

The concepts and results of calculations presented below can be found in the first papers describing the effect.

Each interrogation cycle in an atomic clock typically begins with preparation of the atoms or ions in their ground states. Let P be the probability that any one will be found in its excited state after an interrogation. The amplitude and time of the interrogating signal are typically adjusted so that tuning the LO exactly to the atomic frequency will give $P=1$, that is, all of the atoms or ions being in their excited state. P is determined for each measurement by then exposing the system to a different signal that will generate fluorescence only for the (e.g.) excited state atoms or ions.

In order to obtain effective feedback using periodic measurements of P, the protocol must be arranged so that P has a sensitivity to frequency variations. The sensitivity to frequency variation $g$ can then be defined as
${{d P} \over {d \nu}} = \pi\, g\, t_i$
where $t_i$ is the interrogation time, so that the value of $g$ characterizes the sensitivity of a measurement of P to a variation in frequency of the LO. Since P is maximized (at $P=1$) when the LO is exactly tuned to the atomic transition frequency, the value of $g$ would be zero for that case. Thus, for example, in a frequency standard using Rabi Interrogation, the LO is initially detuned so that $P= 0.5$, and when instability of the LO frequency causes a subsequent measurement of P to return a value different from this, the feedback loop adjusts the LO frequency to bring it back.

Experimentalists use various protocols to mitigate temporal variations in atomic number, light intensity, etc., and so to allow P to be accurately determined, but these are not discussed further here.

The sensitivity of P to variation of the LO frequency for Rabi Interrogation has been previously calculated, and found to have a value of $g_{Rabi} \approx 0.60386$ when the LO frequency has been offset by a frequency $\delta\nu$ to give $P=0.5$. This is achieved when $\Delta \equiv 2\, \delta\nu\, t_i$ is detuned so that $\Delta = \Delta_{half} \approx 0.798685$.

A time-dependent form for the sensitivity of P to frequency variation can now be introduced, defining $g(t)$ as:

$g(t) =2 \lim_{\delta\phi \to 0} {\delta P(\delta\phi, t) \over \delta\phi}$,
where $\delta P(\delta\phi, t)$ is the change in the probability of excitation when a phase step $\delta\phi$ is introduced into the interrogating signal at time $t$. Integrating both sides of the equation shows that the effect on the probability P of a frequency that varies during the excitation process, $\delta\omega(t)$ can be written:

$\Delta P = {1 \over {2 t_c}} \int_0^ {t_c} {g(t) \delta\omega(t) dt}$.
This shows $g(t)$ to be a sensitivity function; representing the time dependence for the effect of frequency variations on the final excitation probability.

The sensitivity function for the case of Rabi Interrogation is shown to be given by:

$g(t)={{\Delta} \over {{(1+\Delta^2)}^{3/2}}} \left[\sin (\Omega_1(t)) \left(1-\cos(\Omega_2(t)\right)+\sin(\Omega_2(t)) \left(1-\cos(\Omega_1(t)\right)\right]$
where $\Omega_1(t) = \Omega\cdot \left({{t}\over {t_i}}\right)$,
$\Omega_2(t) = \Omega\cdot \left(1-\left({t \over {t_i}}\right)\right)$,
$\Omega = \Omega (\Delta) = \pi \sqrt{1 + {\Delta}^2}$,
and where $\Delta \equiv 2\, \delta\nu\, t_i$ is detuned to half-signal amplitude $\Delta = \Delta_{half} \approx 0.798685$.

Taking the time average of this functional form for $g(t)$, gives
${1 \over t_i}{\int_0^{t_i} g(t)\,dt} \approx 0.60386$,
exactly as previously referenced for $g_{Rabi}$: This shows $g(t)$ to be a proper generalization of the previously used sensitivity $g$.

Forms for the sensitivity function for the case of Ramsey Interrogation with a $\pi/2$ phase step between two interrogation pulses (instead of a frequency offset) are somewhat simpler, and are given by:

$$g(t) = \begin{cases}\sin\left ( \pi {{t}\over {2\, t_p}}\right ) &&& ( 0 &< &t& < &t_p) \\
1 &&& ( t_p &< &t& < &t_i - t_p) \\
\sin\left ( \pi {{t_i - t}\over {2\, t_p}}\right ) &&& ( t_i-t_p &< &t& < &t_i) \\
0 &&& ( t_i &< &t& < &t_c) \\
\end{cases}$$
where $t_p$ is the pulse time, $t_i$ is the interrogation time and $t_c$ is the cycle time.

=== Calculation of the limitation to frequency standard stability ===
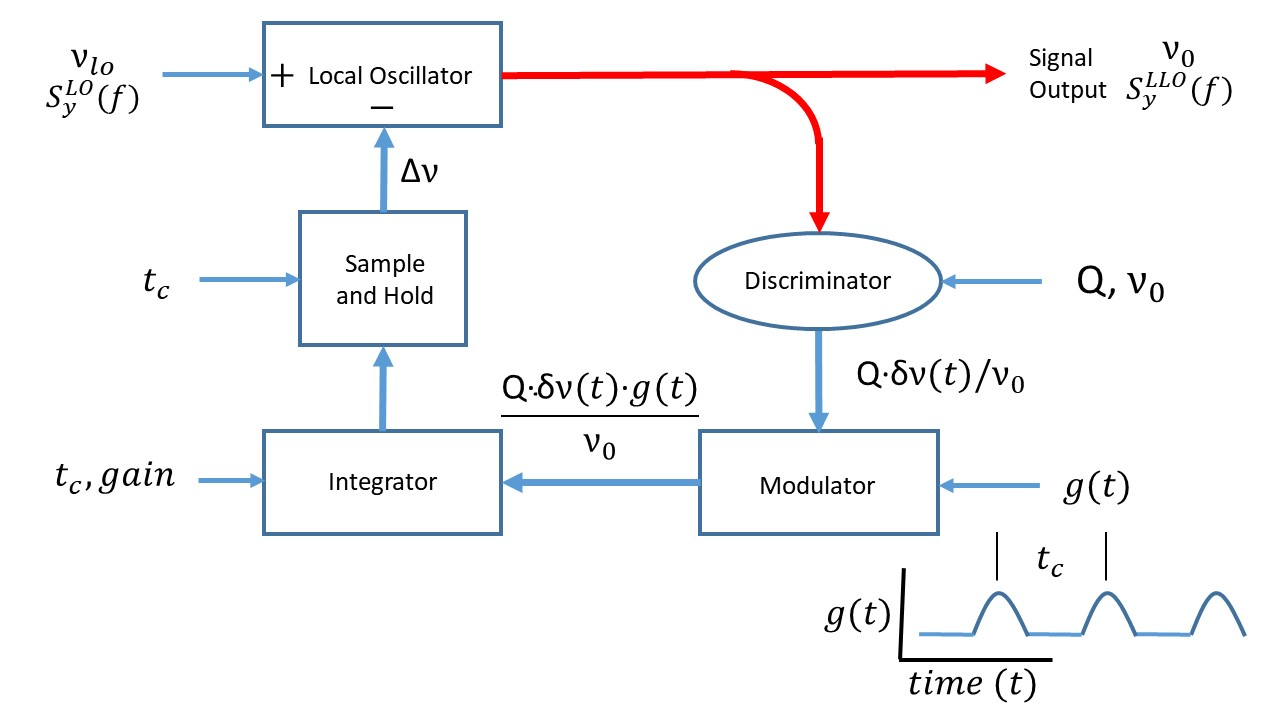
Block diagram for a passive atomic frequency standard using sequential interrogation with cycle time $t_c$. The term $\delta \nu (t)$ has a time dependent part due to frequency noise from the local oscillator $S_y^{LO} (f)$.

The operation of a pulse-mode atomic clock can be broken into functional elements as shown in the block diagram here (for a complete analysis see Greenhall ). Here, the LO is represented by its own block and the interrogated atomic system by the other four blocks. The time dependence of the atomic interrogation process is effected here by the Modulator, in which the time-dependent frequency error $\delta \nu (t)$ is multiplied by a time-dependent gain $g(t)$ as calculated in the previous section. The signal input to the integrator is proportional to the frequency error $\delta \nu$, and this allows it to correct slow frequency errors and drift in the local oscillator.
To understand the action in the block diagram, consider the values $\delta \nu (t)$ and $g(t)$ to be made up of their average values plus the deviations from the average. The value of $\overline{\delta \nu (t)} \cdot \overline{g(t)}$ (with averages taken over one cycle, $t_c$) gives rise to proper feedback operation, locking the frequency of the local oscillator to that of the discriminator, $\nu_0$. Additionally, high frequency components of $(\delta \nu (t) - \overline{\delta \nu (t)}) \cdot \overline{g(t)}$ are smoothed by integration and sampling, giving rise to the already known short-term stability limit. However, the term $(\delta \nu (t) - \overline{\delta \nu (t)}) \cdot (g(t) - \overline{g(t)})$, while generating additional high-frequency noise, also gives rise to very low frequency variations. This is the aliasing effect that causes the loop to improperly correct the local oscillator and which results in additional low frequency variation in the output of the frequency standard.
Following the methodology of (Dick, 1987) and (Santarelli et al., 1996), the Fourier components of the sensitivity function are:
$g_{n,cos} = \int_0^ {t_c} {g(t) \cos \left ( {{2 \pi n t} \over {t_c}}\right ) dt}$,
$g_{n,sin} = \int_0^ {t_c} {g(t) \sin\left ( {{2 \pi n t} \over {t_c}}\right ) dt}$,
$g_n = \sqrt{g_{n,cos}^2 + g_{n,sin}^2 }$ ,
and $g_0 = \int_0^{t_c} {g(t) dt}$,
where $t_c$ is the cycle time. The locked local oscillator provides the useful output signal from any passive (non-maser) frequency standard. A lower limit to its White frequency noise $S_y^{LLO} (0)$ is then shown to be dependent on the frequency noise of the LO at all frequencies $\left( {S_y^{LO} (f)} \right)$ with a value given by
$S_y^{LLO} (0) = { 2 \over {g_0^2}} \cdot {\sum_{n=1}^\infty {g_n^2 \, S_y^{LO} \left ( {n \over t_c} \right ) }}$,
where $t_c$ is the cycle time (the time between successive measurements of the atomic system).
The Allan variance for an oscillator with White frequency noise is given by $\sigma^2_{y}(\tau) = {S_y(0) \over {2 \tau} }$, so that the stability limit due to the effect is given by
$\sigma^2_{y,Dick}(\tau) = { 1 \over {\tau g_0^2}} \cdot {\sum_{n=1}^\infty {g_n^2 \, S_y^{LO}\left({n \over t_c}\right)}}$.
For Ramsey interrogation with very short interrogation pulses, this becomes
$\sigma^2_{y,Dick}(\tau) = { 1 \over {\tau}}{t_c^2 \over t_i^2} \cdot {\sum_{n=1}^\infty {{\sin^2(\pi n \, t_i / t_c) \over {\pi^2} n^2} \, S_y^{LO}\left({n \over t_c}\right)}}$,
where $t_i$ is the interrogation time. For the case of an LO with Flicker frequency noise where $\sigma_y^{LO}(\tau)$ is independent of $\tau$, and where the duty factor $d=t_i/t_c$ has typical values $0.4<d<0.7$, the Allan deviation can be approximated as
$\sigma_{y,Dick}(\tau) \approx {\sigma_y^{LO} \over \sqrt{2\ln(2)}} \cdot \left|{{sin(\pi d) \over {\pi d}}}\right| \cdot \sqrt{t_c \over{\tau}}$.

== See also ==
- Atomic clock
- Frequency standard
