= Tanja Mehlstäubler =

German physicist

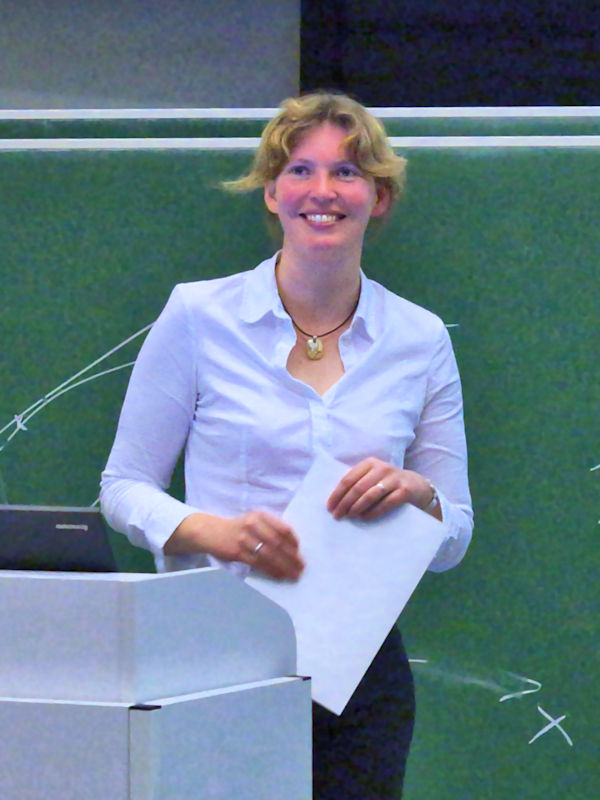
- Mehlstäubler in 2016
- Born: Tanja Elisabeth Mehlstäubler; Passau, Germany
- Known for: Topological defects in ion Coulomb crystal Multi-Ion Clock
- Scientific career
- Fields: Quantum physics
- Institutions: Physikalisch-Technische Bundesanstalt; Leibniz University Hannover; Paris Observatory; Stony Brook University; University of Würzburg

Tanja Elisabeth Mehlstäubler (born 1975 in Passau) is a German physicist and professor of quantum optics and metrology. Mehlstäubler is known for her work on topological defects in ion Coulomb crystals and as a pioneer of the multi-ion atomic clock. She has also developed scalable ion traps for quantum technological applications.

In 2025, the new multi-ion clock (also known as Coulomb crystal clock) broke a world record and contributed to the most precisely measured optical frequency ratio. With the achieved relative uncertainty of below 5 x 10^{-18} a mandatory criterion for the redefinition of the second was met for the first time.

== Early life and career ==
Mehlstäubler began studying physics at the University of Würzburg in 1994. From 1997 to 1999, she studied at Stony Brook University, where she graduated in 1999 with a master's degree in physics in the group of Gene D. Sprouse and Luis Orozco on the topic of precision spectroscopy and parity violation in Franzium atoms. In 2005, Mehlstäubler completed her doctorate under Wolfgang Ertmer at the Leibniz University Hannover on the topic of laser cooling methods for optical atomic frequency standards.

From 2006 to 2007, she worked as a post-doctoral researcher at the Paris Observatory (LNE-SYRTE) in France in the group of Arnaud Landragin in the field of gravimetry with atomic quantum sensors. Mehlstäubler then moved to the Physikalisch-Technische Bundesanstalt (PTB) and set up a junior research group in 2009 with the aim of developing a multi-ion clock. She habilitated in 2016 on the topic of quantum sensors with laser-cooled atoms and ions and has been Professor of Quantum Optics and Metrology at Leibniz University Hannover since 2020.

Mehlstäubler has held a visiting professorship at Osaka University in Japan since 2018.

== Memberships (selection) ==
- Elected member of the review board of the German Research Foundation (since 2020)
- Advisory Board of the IPHT Jena (since 2023)
- Member of the board of the Cluster of Excellence QuantumFrontiers
- Member of the Studienstiftung (from 1996 to 1999)
