= List of atomic clocks =

This is a list of some experimental laboratory atomic clocks worldwide.

Name	Operation date	Type	Accuracy	Location	Image
CS1	1969	Cs	7×10^{−15}	Physikalisch-Technische Bundesanstalt; Braunschweig, Germany	
CS2	1985	Cs	1.2×10^{−14}	Physikalisch-Technische Bundesanstalt; Braunschweig, Germany	
CS3	1988	Cs		Physikalisch-Technische Bundesanstalt; Braunschweig, Germany	
CS4	1992-2005	Cs		Physikalisch-Technische Bundesanstalt; Braunschweig, Germany	
CSF1	1999	Cs fountain	4×10^{−16}	Physikalisch-Technische Bundesanstalt; Braunschweig, Germany	
CSF2	2009	Cs fountain	2×10^{−16}	Physikalisch-Technische Bundesanstalt; Braunschweig, Germany	
FOCS				Federal Institute of Metrology; Wabern, Switzerland	
NPL-CsF2, Yb+ and Sr+ ion clocks, Sr lattice clock, 4 hydrogen masers				National Physical Laboratory; Teddington, London, United Kingdom	
NIST Ion Clock	2025	Charged Al ion with Mg ion	5.5×10^{−19}	NIST Boulder Laboratories; Boulder, Colorado United States	
NIST-F1		Cs fountain	3.1×10^{−16}	NIST Boulder Laboratories; Boulder, Colorado United States	
NIST-F2		Cs fountain	1.1×10^{−16}	NIST Boulder Laboratories; Boulder, Colorado United States	
USNO Alternate Master Clock				Schriever Air Force Base; El Paso County, Colorado United States	
WWV				WWVB; Larimer County, Colorado United States	
Department of Defense master clock				United States Naval Observatory; Washington, D.C. United States	
18 cesium atomic clocks and 4 hydrogen maser clocks		Cs, H		National Institute of Information and Communications Technology; Koganei, Japan	
Optical lattice clock				University of Tokyo; Bunkyō, Tokyo, Japan	
NMIJ-F1, NMIJ-F2		Cs fountain	4.7×10^{−16}	National Metrology Institute of Japan; Tokyo, Japan	
Optical clock	2012	Ca ion		Hubei, China	
Caesium Beam Atomic Clock		Cs		Hong Kong Observatory; Tsim Sha Tsui, Hong Kong	
9 Agilent 5071A caesium clocks		Cs	5×10^{−13}	National Standard Time and Frequency Laboratory; Taoyuan, Taiwan	
KRISS-1		Cs	1×10^{−14}	Korea Research Institute of Standards and Science; Daejeon, South Korea	
Caesium atomic clocks		Cs		National Metrology Centre; Queenstown, Singapore	
Five caesium clocks, one passive hydrogen maser, two active hydrogen masers		Cs, H		National Physical Laboratory of India; New Delhi, India	
DOST-PAGASA Juan Time				Department of Science and Technology; Taguig, Philippines	
Caesium clocks, Hydrogen Maser		Cs		Indonesian Institute of Sciences; Jakarta, Indonesia	
SOC: Space Optical Clock breadboard (Sr lattice clock)		Sr lattice		European Space Agency; Düsseldorf, Germany; Braunschweig, Germany; Birmingham, United Kingdom; Paris, France; Florence, Italy; Turin, Italy; Prague, Czech Republic	
Deep Space Atomic Clock	2019-2021	Hg ion		Jet Propulsion Laboratory; La Cañada Flintridge, California; United States	
Caesium atomic clocks		Cs		Laboratorium Czasu i Częstotliwości (CBK PAN); Borówiec, Poland	
