= National Timing Centre =

Proposed network of atomic clocks in the UK

The United Kingdom National Timing Centre is the proposed network of atomic clocks consisting of a central building, and a series of other locations across the UK.

The cost of the new system will cost £36 million, but additionally the UK government has given £6.7 million through Innovate UK Funding and £40 million toward a new research program Quantum Technologies for fundamental physics to support UK research and investment.

Locations: University of Birmingham; University of Strathclyde; University of Surrey; BT Adastral Park, Suffolk; BBC, Manchester; National Physical Laboratory, Teddington.

== History ==
Discussions around a United Kingdom National Timing Centre began on 19 February 2020 as a response to the United Kingdom's over reliance on the European Union Global Navigation Satellite System (GNSS), and the United States of America's (USA) GNSS Systems.
