= NIST-F2 =

Atomic clock used for US time standard

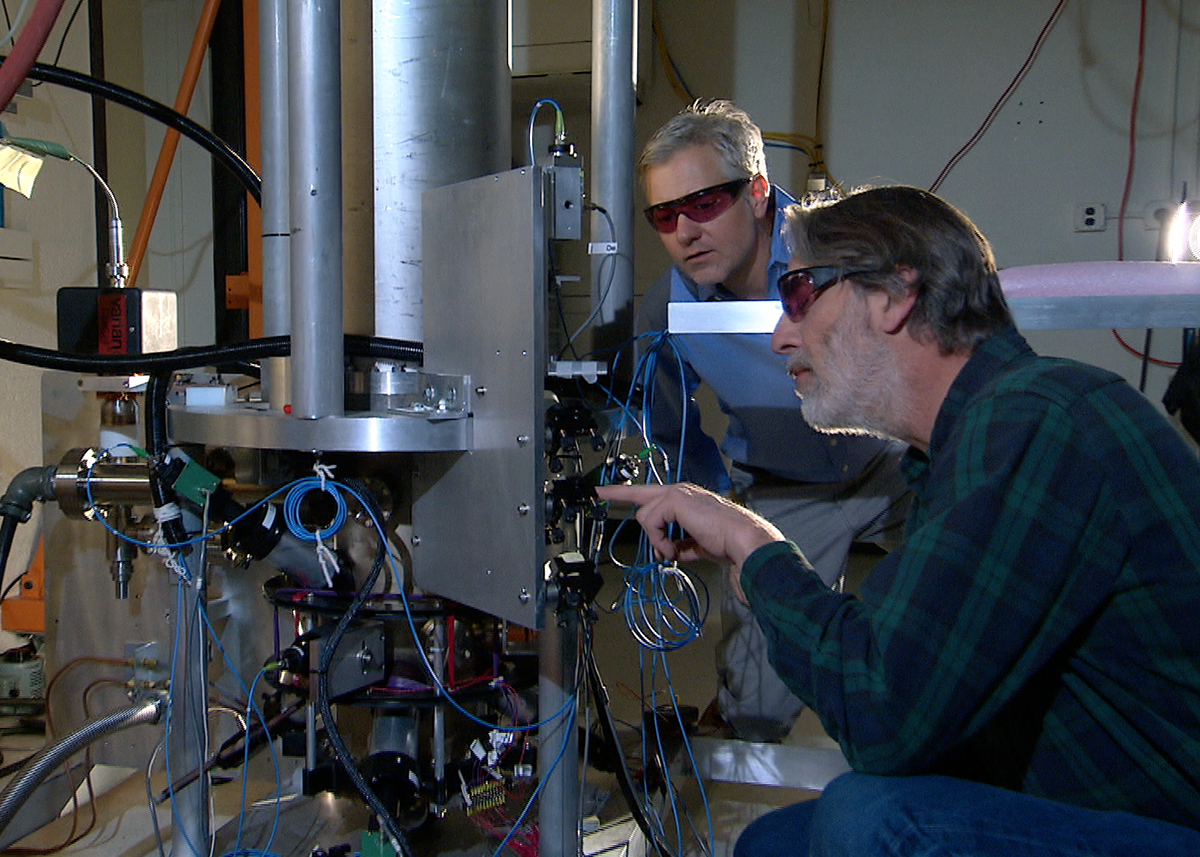
NIST physicists Steve Jefferts (foreground) and Tom Heavner with the NIST-F2 cesium fountain atomic clock, a civilian time standard for the United States

NIST-F2 is a caesium fountain atomic clock that, along with NIST-F1, serves as the United States' primary time and frequency standard. NIST-F2 was brought online on 3 April 2014.

== Accuracy ==
NIST-F1, a cesium fountain atomic clock used since 1999, has a fractional inaccuracy (δf / f) of less than 5×10^{−16}.

=== Anticipated accuracy ===
The planned performance of NIST-F2 is δf / f < 1×10^{−16}. At this planned performance level the NIST-F2 clock will not gain or lose a second in at least 300 million years.

=== Evaluated accuracy ===
The evaluated accuracy (u_{B}) reports of various primary frequency and time standards are published online by the International Bureau of Weights and Measures (BIPM). The first in-house accuracy evaluation of NIST-F2 reported a u_{B} of 1.1 × 10^{−16}. In March 2014 and March 2015 the NIST-F2 cesium fountain clock reported a u_{B} of 1.5 × 10^{−16} in the BIPM reports of evaluation of primary frequency standards.

The last submission of NIST-F1 to BIPM TAI was February 2016.

== Replicas ==
At the request of the Italian standards organization, NIST manufactured many duplicate components for a second version of NIST-F2, known as IT-CsF2 to be operated by the Istituto Nazionale di Ricerca Metrologica (INRiM), NIST's counterpart in Turin, Italy. As of February 2016 the IT-CsF2 cesium fountain clock started reporting a u_{B} of 1.7 × 10^{−16} in the BIPM reports of evaluation of primary frequency standards.
