= Coulomb crystal clock =

The Coulomb crystal clock is a type of optical atomic clock. Traditionally, optical ion clocks have been operated with a single clock ion only in order to achieve high accuracy operation. This requires a measurement time of months to years to resolve clock frequencies at the level of their possible accuracy. Similar to an optical lattice clock, Coulomb crystal clocks overcome this fundamental limitation by measuring multiple atoms simultaneously; however, in this case, the atoms are ions in a Coulomb crystal. To manage the significant electric field gradients and resulting quadrupole shifts in ion traps, such systems utilize ions with low electric quadrupole moments in the reference transition, such as ¹¹⁵In⁺ and ²⁷Al⁺, dynamically decouple shifts or operate at a magic angle of the magnetic field.

A recently realized crystal clock featuring ¹¹⁵In⁺ ions and ¹⁷²Yb⁺ sympathetic cooling ions demonstrated a 2.5 × 10⁻¹⁸ fractional systematic uncertainty, with stability improvements shown at a 1-second averaging time. Frequency ratios measured against ⁸⁷Sr and ¹⁷¹Yb⁺ (E3) achieved uncertainties of 4.2 × 10⁻¹⁷ and 4.4 × 10⁻¹⁸, with the latter having been the most precise frequency ratio and breaking a world record to achieve for the first time a mandatory criterium for the redefinition of the second. Future developments include potential operation with approximately 100 ions in trap arrays and proposed 3D Coulomb crystals of 1000 ions.
