= Atomic fountain =

Laser-cooled atoms in flight

An atomic fountain is a neutral atomic trap that measures an atomic hyperfine transition by pushing a cloud of laser-cooled atoms vertically and allowing them to fall through an interaction region under the influence of gravity. The atomic cloud is cooled and pushed upwards by counter-propagating lasers in an optical molasses configuration. The atomic transition is measured precisely with coherent microwaves while the atoms pass through the interaction region. The measured transition can be used in an atomic clock measurement to high precision.

The measurement of a hyperfine transition in an atomic fountain uses the Ramsey method. In broad strokes, the Ramsey method involves exposing a cloud of atoms to a brief radiofrequency (rf) electromagnetic field in the interaction region at two instances. After being pushed vertically past the interaction region, the atoms will fall back down over a free-fall time T, which may be on the order of seconds. The atomic cloud falls and passes back through the interaction region and is exposed to a second rf pulse. The microwave frequency is swept across the atomic transition over many repeated measurements to determine the resonant frequency. The fraction of the atoms in the cloud that have been driven from the initial state to final state is determined with a detection scheme.

NIST-F1 cesium atomic fountain clock

The use of an atomic fountain with a cooled atomic cloud allows for wait times on the order of one second, which results in a much higher frequency resolution compared to a hot atomic beam, which may have interaction times on the order of tens of microseconds. This is one reason why NIST-F1, a caesium fountain clock, with a fractional instability of $2 \times 10^{-16}$, loses less than one nanosecond per year. The NIST-7 caesium beam clock, with a fractional instability of $1 \times 10^{-14}$, loses 30 nanoseconds in a year.

== History ==
The idea of the atomic fountain was first proposed in the 1950s by Jerrold Zacharias. Zacharias attempted to implement an atomic fountain using a thermal beam of atoms, under the assumption that the atoms at the low-velocity end of the Maxwell–Boltzmann distribution would be of sufficiently low energy to execute a reasonably sized parabolic trajectory. However, the attempt was not successful because fast atoms in a thermal beam struck the low-velocity atoms and scattered them.
