= Coulomb crystal =

Physical structures important for trapped ions

A Coulomb crystal (also Ion Coulomb crystal) is a collection of trapped ions confined in a crystal-like structure at low temperature. The structures represent an equilibrium between the repulsive Coulomb interaction between ions and the electric and magnetic fields used to confine the ions. Depending on the confinement techniques and parameters, as well as the number of ions in the trap, these can be 1-, 2- or 3-dimensional, with typical spacing between ions of ~10μm, which is significantly larger than typical solid-state crystal structures. Outside of ion traps, Coulomb crystals also occur naturally in celestial objects such as neutron stars.

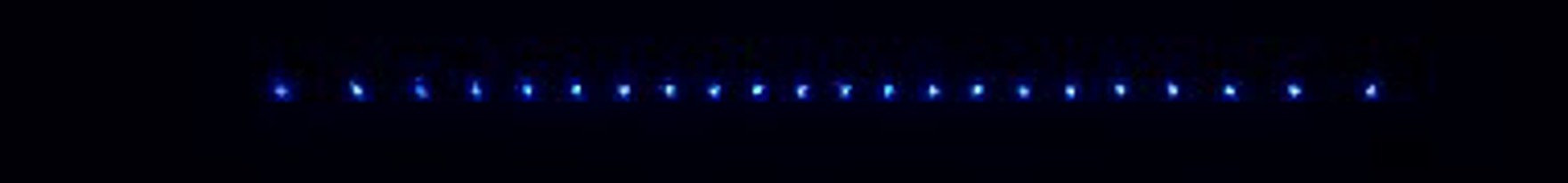
1D ion Coulomb crystal in linear RF trap

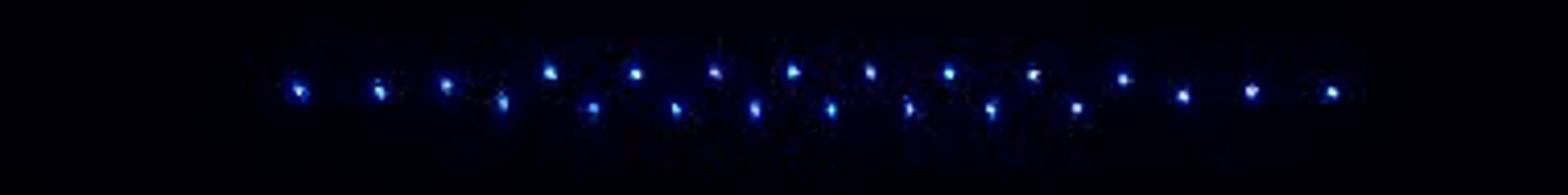
2D ion Coulomb crystal in linear RF trap

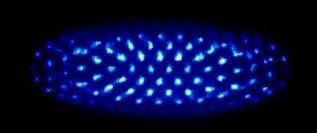
3D ion Coulomb crystal in linear RF trap

== Description ==
The magnitude of the Coulomb interaction F between two ions of charge q and Q a distance R apart is given by

$F = \frac{qQ}{4\pi \epsilon_0 R^2}$

directed along the axis between the two ions, where a positive value represents a repulsive force and vice versa.

Trapping techniques include variations on the Paul trap and Penning trap, where the former uses only electric fields while the latter also uses magnetic fields to confine the ions. Considering the simple case of two ions confined in a linear Paul trap, an oscillating electric quadrupole field (in the radiofrequency regime) confines the ion to an orbit around the axis normal to the oscillating fields (the axis along the static electric field between the end electrodes). The coulomb force enforces the spacing between the ions while the quadrupole field parameters determine the trap strength/stability and therefore the size of the orbit (how confined they are to the trap axis).

== Experimental realization ==
The typical process for creating ICCs in the lab involves ionization of an elemental source, followed by confinement in an ion trap, where they are imaged via their fluorescence. Changing parameters such as the axial or radial confining potentials may lead to different observed geometries of the crystal, even if the number of ions does not change.

For measurements involving highly charged ions, these are typically observed as "dark" areas in the fluorescence of the Coulomb crystal, due to their different energy levels. This effect is also noticeable when ions in the Coulomb crystal appear to disappear, without changing the structure of the crystal, due to mixing with impurities in a non-ideal vacuum.

Heating effects are also important in the characterisation of Coulomb crystals, since thermal motion can cause the image to blur. This may be stimulated by the cooling laser being slightly off-resonance, and so needs to be carefully monitored.

== Applications and properties ==
Coulomb crystals of various ionic species have applications across much of physics, for example, in high precision spectroscopy, quantum information processing, tests of nanotribology, and cavity QED.
