= NIST-F1 =

Atomic clock

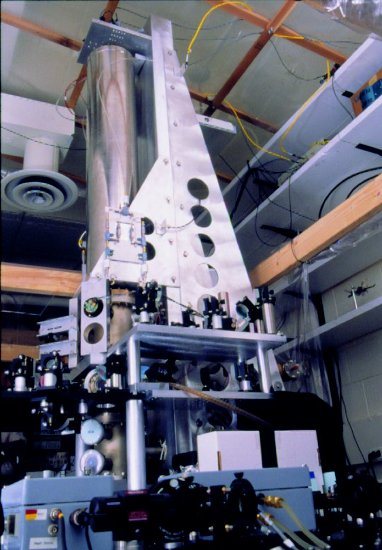
NIST-F1, source of the official time of the United States

NIST-F1 is a cesium fountain clock, a type of atomic clock, in the National Institute of Standards and Technology (NIST) in Boulder, Colorado, and served as the United States' primary time and frequency standard. The clock took fewer than four years to test and build, and was developed by Steve Jefferts and Dawn Meekhof of the Time and Frequency Division of NIST's Physical Measurement Laboratory.

The clock replaced NIST-7, a cesium beam atomic clock used from 1993 to 1999. NIST-F1 is ten times more accurate than NIST-7. It has been succeeded by a new standard, NIST-F2, announced in April 2014. The NIST-F2 standard aims to be about three times more accurate than the NIST-F1 standard, and there are plans to operate it simultaneously with the NIST-F1 clock. The most recent contribution of NIST-F1 to BIPM TAI was in March 2016.

== Frequency measurement ==
The apparatus consists of an optical molasses made of counter-propagating lasers which cool and trap a gas of cesium atoms. Once trapped, the atoms are propelled upward by two vertical lasers inside a microwave chamber. Depending on the exact frequency of the microwaves, the cesium atoms will reach an excited state. Upon passing through a laser beam, the atoms will fluoresce (emit photons). The microwave frequency which produces maximum fluorescence is used to define the second.

Similar atomic fountain clocks, with comparable accuracy, are operated by other time and frequency laboratories, such as the Paris Observatory, the National Physical Laboratory (NPL) in the United Kingdom and the Physikalisch-Technische Bundesanstalt in Germany.

== Accuracy ==
As of 2013, the clock's uncertainty was about 3.1 × 10^{−16} (0.00031 ppt). It is expected to neither gain nor lose a second in more than 100 million years.

== Evaluated accuracy ==
The evaluated accuracy u_{B} reports of various primary frequency and time standards are published online by the International Bureau of Weights and Measures (BIPM).
In May 2013 the NIST-F1 cesium fountain clock reported a u_{B} of 3.1 × 10^{−16}. However, that BIPM report and the other recent reports are based on an evaluation that dates to 2005. It used a model developed by NIST to evaluate Doppler frequency shifts, known as distributed cavity phase, some believe to be incorrect. The recent evaluation of NIST-F2 did not use the NIST model of distributed cavity phase used for NIST-F1 and, while NIST-F2 instead used an approach more aligned with other standards, that evaluation of distributed cavity phase was shown to have other shortcomings.

Beginning in 2020, NIST-F1's microwave cavity was rebuilt to create NIST-F4. which as of April 2025 is undergoing certification by BIPM.

On December 19, 2025, a power outage at NIST combined with failure of a backup generator caused a disruption in signals sent out from the Boulder clock. The clock's precision was later restored.
