= Atomic clock =

Clock that monitors the resonant frequency of atoms

Simplified block diagram of a typical commercial caesium beam frequency reference

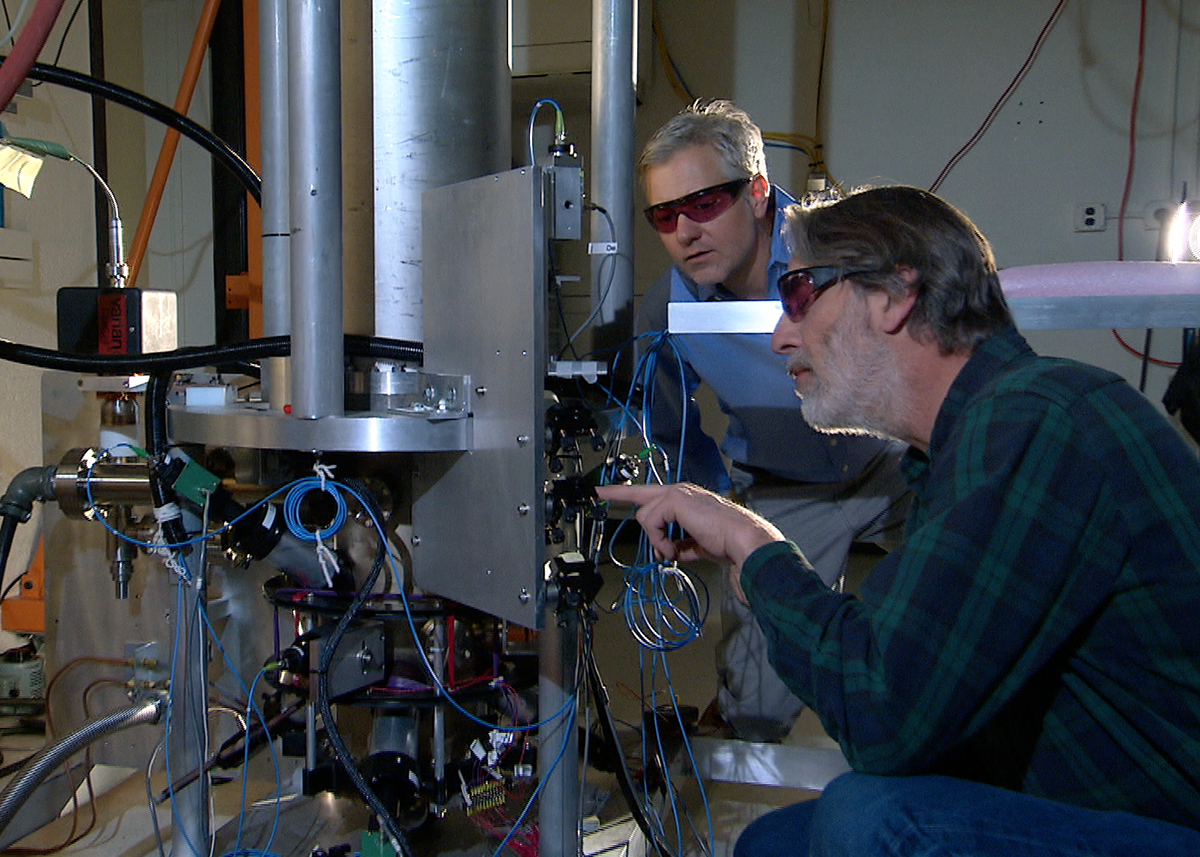
NIST physicists Steve Jefferts (foreground) and Tom Heavner with the NIST-F2 caesium fountain atomic clock, a civilian time standard for the USA

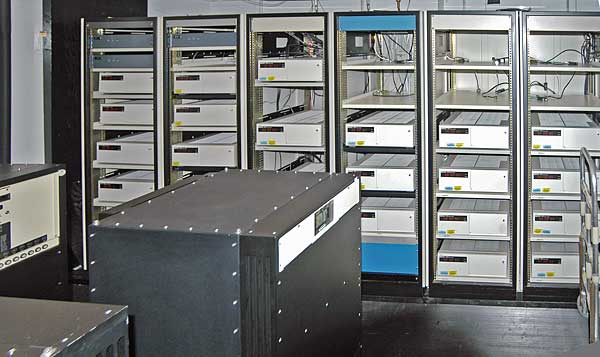
The master atomic clock ensemble at the U.S. Naval Observatory in Washington, D.C., which provides the time standard for the U.S. Department of Defense. The rack-mounted units in the background are HP 5071A caesium beam clocks. The black units in the foreground are Sigma-Tau MHM-2010 hydrogen maser standards.

An atomic clock is a clock that measures time by monitoring the resonant frequency of atoms. It is based on the fact that atoms have quantised energy levels, and transitions between such levels are driven by very specific frequencies of electromagnetic radiation. This phenomenon serves as the basis for the SI definition of the second:

The second, symbol s, is the SI unit of time. It is defined by taking the fixed numerical value of the caesium frequency, $\Delta \nu_\text{Cs}$, the unperturbed ground-state hyperfine transition frequency of the caesium-133 atom, to be 9192631770 when expressed in the unit Hz, which is equal to s^{−1}.

This definition underpins the system of TAI, which is maintained by an ensemble of atomic clocks around the world. The system of UTC—the basis of civil time—implements leap seconds to allow clock time to stay within one second of Earth's rotation.

The accurate time-keeping capabilities of atomic clocks are also used for navigation by satellite networks such as the EU's Galileo Programme and the United States' GPS. The timing accuracy of the atomic clocks matters because even a timing error of 1 nanosecond (10^{−9} s) corresponds to a positional error of roughly 30 cm when multiplied by the speed of light.

The main variety of atomic clock in use today employs caesium atoms (or ions) cooled to near absolute zero. For example, the United States' primary standard, the NIST caesium fountain clock named NIST-F2, operates with a relative uncertainty around 10^{−16}.

== Recent advances ==
In July 2025, researchers at the National Institute of Standards and Technology in the United States reported a record-setting optical atomic clock based on a trapped aluminium ion. This "quantum logic" clock achieves a systematic uncertainty corresponding to around 19 decimal places of accuracy, representing a 41% improvement over the previous record and being 2.6 times more stable than any other ion clock.

== Redefinition of the second ==
The rapid improvement in optical atomic clock performance has prompted the global time-and-frequency community to prepare for a possible redefinition of the SI second. In June 2025, a coordinated international comparison of optical clocks across six countries was reported—marking a major step towards establishing a global optical-time standard.

== Technological impact ==
Optical atomic clocks are enabling new applications: ultra-precise time- and-frequency dissemination, improved global navigation satellite systems, relativistic geodesy (measuring differences in gravitational potential via clock rates), and tests of fundamental constants and general relativity.

== History ==
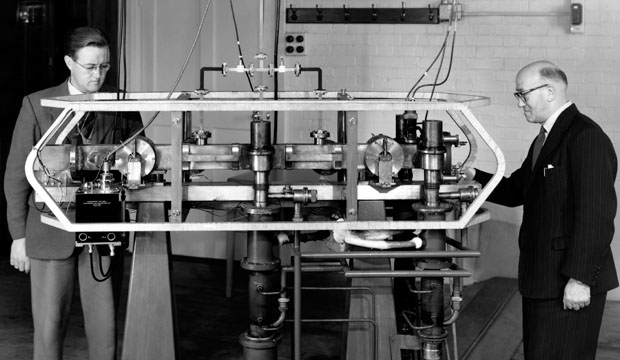
Louis Essen (right) and Jack Parry (left) standing next to the world's first caesium-133 atomic clock in 1955, at the National Physical Laboratory in west London, England.

The Scottish physicist James Clerk Maxwell proposed measuring time with the vibrations of light waves in his 1873 Treatise on Electricity and Magnetism: 'A more universal unit of time might be found by taking the periodic time of vibration of the particular kind of light whose wave length is the unit of length.' Maxwell argued this would be more accurate than the Earth's rotation, which defines the mean solar second for timekeeping.

During the 1930s, the American physicist Isidor Isaac Rabi built equipment for atomic beam magnetic resonance frequency clocks.

The accuracy of mechanical, electromechanical and quartz clocks is reduced by temperature fluctuations. This led to the idea of measuring the frequency of an atom's vibrations to keep time more accurately, as proposed by James Clerk Maxwell, Lord Kelvin, and Isidor Rabi. A prototype measuring phase transitions of the ammonia molecule was developed in 1949. The first practical atomic clock using caesium atoms was built at the National Physical Laboratory in the United Kingdom in 1955 by Louis Essen in collaboration with Jack Parry.

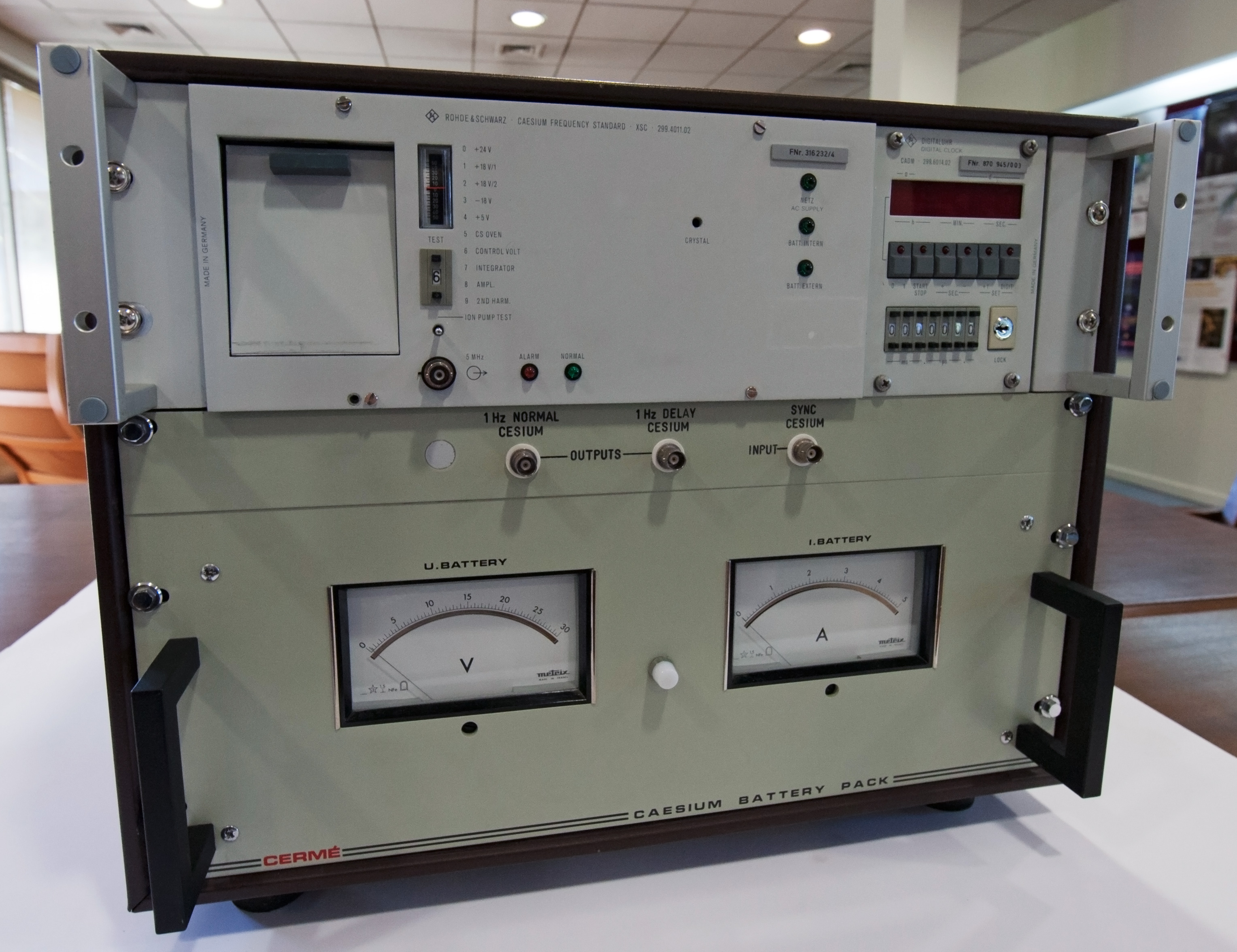
A caesium atomic clock from 1975 (upper unit) and battery backup (lower unit)

In 1949, Alfred Kastler and Jean Brossel developed a technique called optical pumping for electron energy level transitions in atoms using light. This technique is useful for creating much stronger magnetic resonance and microwave absorption signals. Unfortunately, this caused a side effect with a light shift of the resonant frequency. Claude Cohen-Tannoudji and others managed to reduce the light shifts to acceptable levels.

Ramsey developed a method, now commonly known as Ramsey interferometry, for higher frequencies and narrower resonances in the oscillating fields. Kolsky, Phipps, Ramsey, and Silsbee used this technique for molecular beam spectroscopy in 1950.

After 1956, atomic clocks were studied by many groups, such as the National Institute of Standards and Technology (NIST, formerly the National Bureau of Standards) in the USA, the Physikalisch-Technische Bundesanstalt (PTB) in Germany, the National Research Council (NRC) in Canada, the National Physical Laboratory in the United Kingdom, International Time Bureau (French: Bureau International de l'Heure, abbreviated BIH), at the Paris Observatory, the National Radio Company, Bomac, Varian, Hewlett–Packard and Frequency & Time Systems.

During the 1950s, the National Radio Company sold more than 50 units of the first atomic clock, the Atomichron. In 1964, engineers at Hewlett-Packard released the 5060 rack-mounted model of caesium clocks.

=== Definition of the second ===
In 1968, the SI defined the duration of the second to be 9192631770 vibrations of the unperturbed ground-state hyperfine transition frequency of the caesium-133 atom. Prior to that it was defined by there being 31556925.9747 seconds in the tropical year 1900. In 1997, the International Committee for Weights and Measures (CIPM) added that the preceding definition refers to a caesium atom at rest at a temperature of absolute zero. Following the 2019 revision of the SI, the definition of every base unit except the mole and almost every derived unit relies on the definition of the second.

Timekeeping researchers seek an even more stable atomic reference for the second, with a plan to find a more precise definition of the second as atomic clocks improve based on optical clocks or the Rydberg constant around 2030.

=== Metrology advancements and optical clocks ===
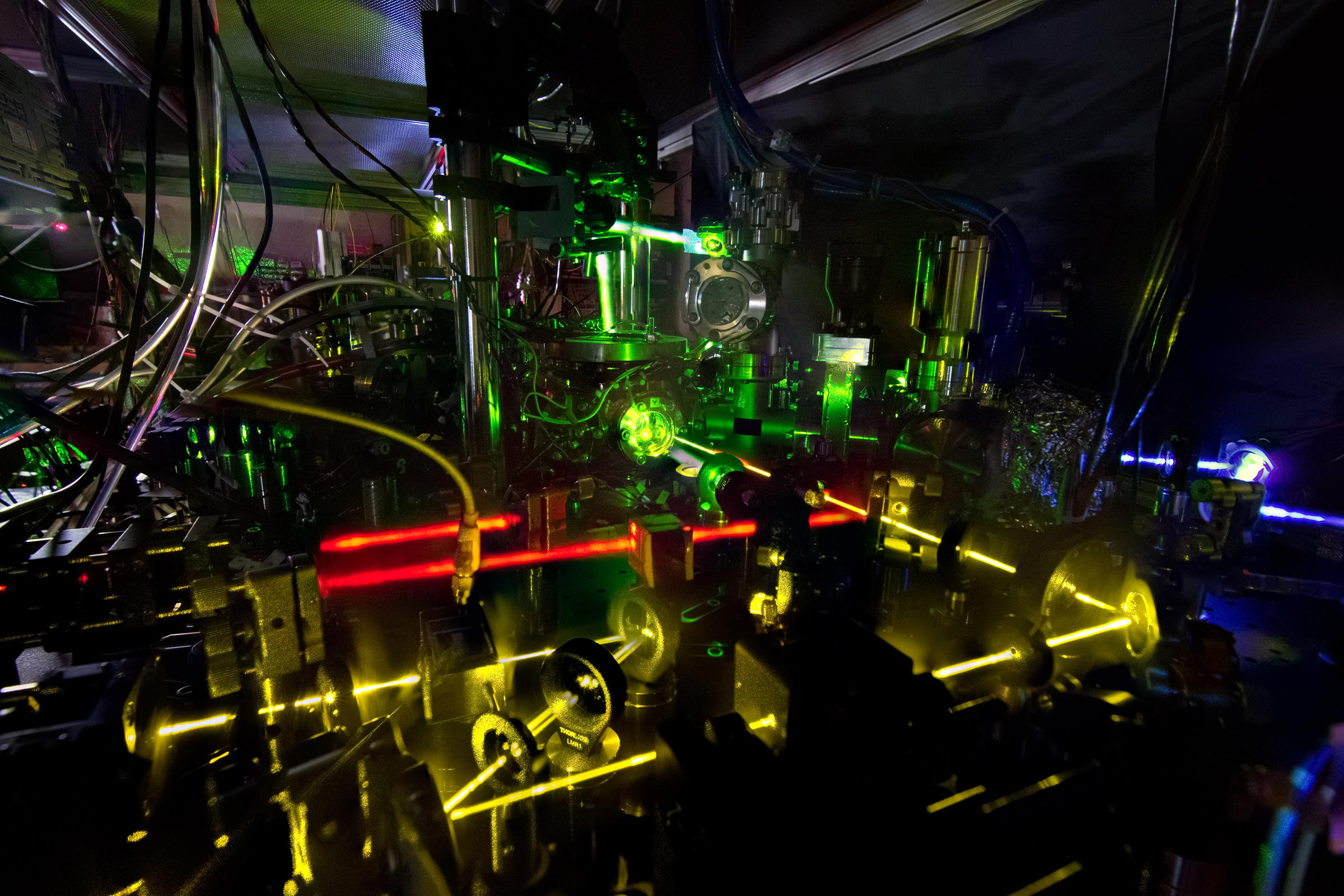
An ytterbium lattice clock that uses photons to measure time precisely

Technological developments such as lasers and optical frequency combs in the 1990s led to increasing accuracy of atomic clocks. Lasers enable the possibility of optical-range control over atomic states transitions, which has a much higher frequency than that of microwaves; while optical frequency comb measures highly accurately such high frequency oscillation in light.

The first advance beyond the precision of caesium clocks occurred at NIST in 2010 with the demonstration of a "quantum logic" optical clock that used aluminum ions to achieve a precision of 10^{−17}. Optical clocks are a very active area of research in the field of metrology as scientists work to develop clocks based on elements ytterbium, mercury, aluminum, and strontium. Scientists at JILA demonstrated a strontium clock with a frequency precision of 10^{−18} in 2015. Scientists at NIST developed a quantum logic clock that measured a single aluminum ion in 2019 with a frequency uncertainty of 9.4×10^{−19}.

At JILA in September 2021, scientists demonstrated an optical strontium clock with a differential frequency precision of 7.6×10^{−21} between atomic ensembles separated by 1 mm. The second is expected to be redefined when the field of optical clocks matures, sometime around the year 2030 or 2034. In order for this to occur, optical clocks must be consistently capable of measuring frequency with accuracy at or better than 2×10^{−18}. In addition, methods for reliably comparing different optical clocks around the world in national metrology labs must be demonstrated, and the comparison must show relative clock frequency accuracies at or better than 5×10^{−18}.

=== Chip-scale atomic clocks ===
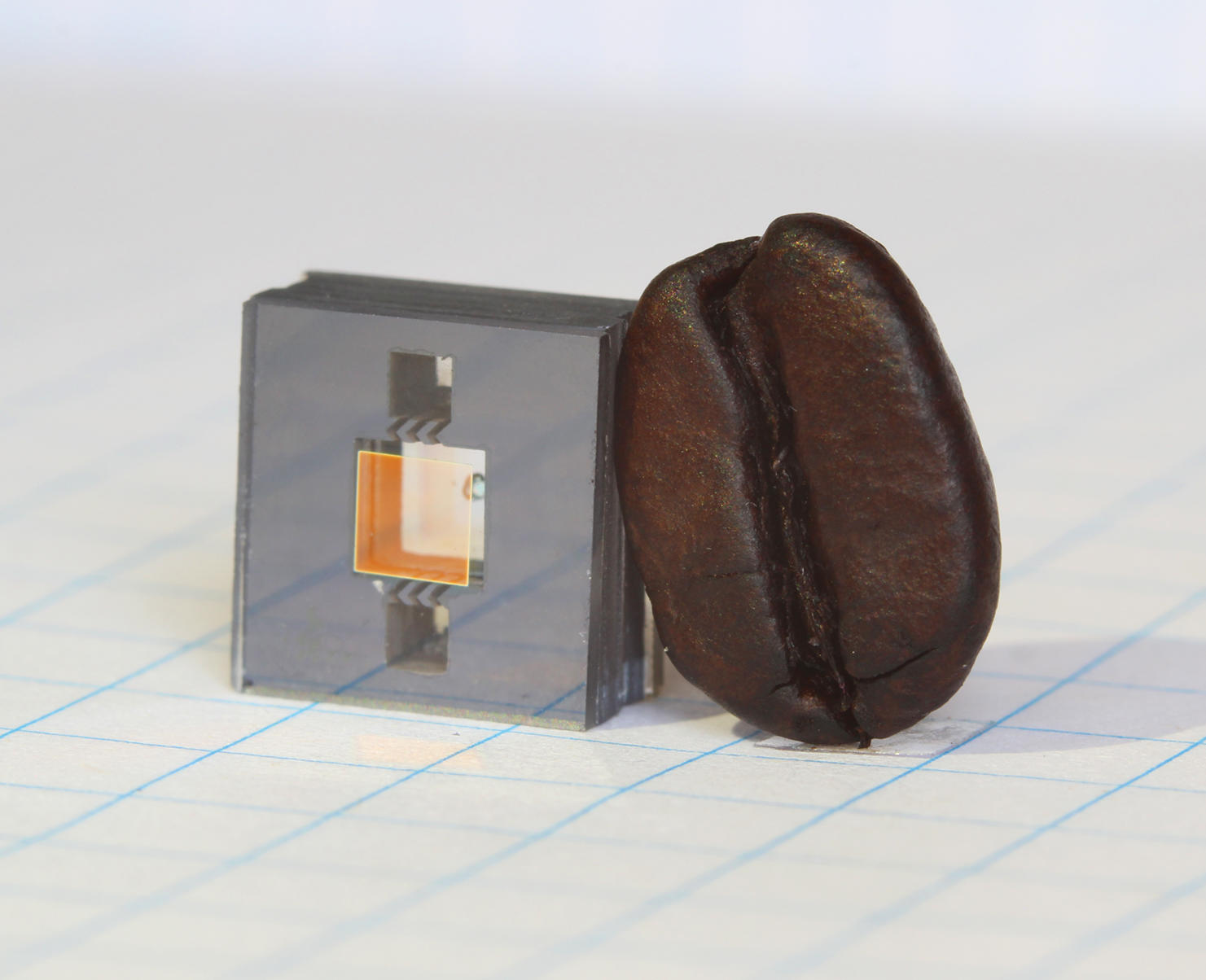
The heart of NIST's next-generation miniature atomic clock – ticking at high "optical" frequencies – is this vapor cell on a chip, shown next to a coffee bean for scale.

Reducing the size and power consumption of optical clocks is necessary to enable their use in geodesy and GPS navigation. In August 2004, NIST scientists demonstrated a chip-scale atomic clock that was 100 times smaller than an ordinary atomic clock and had a much smaller power consumption of 125 mW. The atomic clock was about the size of a grain of rice with a frequency of about 9 GHz. This technology became available commercially in 2011.

== Measuring time with atomic clocks ==
=== Clock mechanism ===
An atomic clock is based on a system of atoms which may be in one of two possible energy states. A group of atoms is prepared in a lower energy state, and then subjected to microwave radiation. If the radiation is of the correct frequency, a number of atoms will transition to the higher energy state. The closer the frequency is to the inherent oscillation frequency of the atoms, the more atoms will switch states. Such correlation allows very accurate tuning of the frequency of the microwave radiation. Once the microwave radiation is adjusted to a known frequency where the maximum number of atoms switch states, the atom and thus, its associated transition frequency, can be used as a timekeeping oscillator to measure elapsed time.

All timekeeping devices use oscillatory phenomena to accurately measure time, whether it is the rotation of the Earth for a sundial, the swinging of a pendulum in a grandfather clock, the vibrations of springs and gears in a watch, or voltage changes in a quartz clock's crystal oscillator. However all of these are easily affected by temperature changes and are not very accurate. The most accurate clocks use atomic vibrations to keep track of time. Clock transition states in atoms are insensitive to temperature and other environmental factors and the oscillation frequency is much higher than any of the other clocks (in microwave frequency regime and higher).

One of the most important factors in a clock's performance is the atomic line quality factor, Q, which is defined as the ratio of the absolute frequency $\nu_0$ of the resonance to the linewidth of the resonance itself $\Delta \nu$. Atomic resonance has a much higher Q than mechanical devices. Atomic clocks can also be isolated from environmental effects to a much higher degree. Atomic clocks have the benefit that atoms are universal, which means that the oscillation frequency is also universal. This is different from quartz and mechanical time measurement devices that do not have a universal frequency.

A clock's quality can be specified by two parameters: accuracy and stability. Accuracy is a measurement of the degree to which the clock's ticking rate can be counted on to match some absolute standard such as the inherent hyperfine frequency of an isolated atom or ion. Stability describes how the clock performs when averaged over time to reduce the impact of noise and other short-term fluctuations (see precision).

The instability of an atomic clock is specified by its Allan deviation $\sigma_y(\tau)$. The limiting instability due to atom or ion counting statistics is given by

$$\sigma_{y,\, {\rm atoms}}(\tau) \approx \frac{\Delta \nu}{\nu_0 \sqrt{N}} \sqrt{\frac{T_\text{c}}{\tau}},$$

where $\Delta \nu$ is the spectroscopic linewidth of the clock system, $N$ is the number of atoms or ions used in a single measurement, $T_\text{c}$ is the time required for one cycle, and $\tau$ is the averaging period. This means instability is smaller when the linewidth $\Delta \nu$ is smaller and when $\sqrt{N}$ (the signal to noise ratio) is larger. The stability improves as the time $\tau$ over which the measurements are averaged increases from seconds to hours to days. The stability is most heavily affected by the oscillator frequency $\nu_0$. This is why optical clocks such as strontium clocks (429 terahertz) are much more stable than caesium clocks (9.19 GHz).

Modern clocks such as atomic fountains or optical lattices that use sequential interrogation are found to generate a type of noise that mimics and adds to the instability inherent in atom or ion counting. This effect is called the Dick effect and is typically the primary stability limitation for the newer atomic clocks. It is an aliasing effect; high frequency noise components in the local oscillator ("LO") are heterodyned to near zero frequency by harmonics of the repeating variation in feedback sensitivity to the LO frequency. The effect places new and stringent requirements on the LO, which must now have low phase noise in addition to high stability, thereby increasing the cost and complexity of the system. For the case of an LO with flicker frequency noise where $\sigma_y^{\rm LO}(\tau)$ is independent of $\tau$, the interrogation time is $T_i$, and where the duty factor $d=T_i/T_c$ has typical values $0.4<d<0.7$, the Allan deviation can be approximated as

$$\sigma_{y,\,{\rm Dick}}(\tau) \approx \frac{\sigma_y^{\rm LO}}{\sqrt{2\ln(2)}} \cdot \left|\frac{\sin(\pi d)}{\pi d}\right| \cdot \sqrt{\frac{T_c}{\tau}}.$$

This expression shows the same dependence on $T_c / {\tau}$ as does $\sigma_{y,\, {\rm atoms}}(\tau)$, and, for many of the newer clocks, is significantly larger. Analysis of the effect and its consequence as applied to optical standards has been treated in a major review (Ludlow, et al., 2015) that lamented on "the pernicious influence of the Dick effect", and in several other papers.

=== Tuning and optimization ===
The core of atomic clocks contain a microwave cavity containing a gas. In a hydrogen maser clock, the gas emits microwaves (masering) on a hyperfine transition. As the field in the cavity oscillates, the cavity is tuned for maximum microwave amplitude.

The adjustment tries to correct for unwanted side-effects, such as frequencies from other electron transitions, temperature changes, and the spreading in frequencies caused by the vibration of molecules, including Doppler broadening.

Many of the newer clocks, including microwave clocks such as trapped-ion or fountain clocks, and optical clocks such as lattice clocks, use a sequential interrogation protocol rather than the frequency-modulation interrogation. An advantage of sequential interrogation is that it can accommodate much higher Qs, with ringing times of seconds rather than milliseconds. These clocks also typically have a dead time, during which the atom or ion collections are analyzed, renewed and driven into a proper quantum state, after which they are interrogated with a signal from a local oscillator (LO) for a time of perhaps a second or so. Analysis of the final state of the atoms is then used to generate a correction signal to keep the LO frequency locked to that of the atoms or ions.

== Accuracy ==
The historical accuracy of atomic clocks from NIST

The accuracy of atomic clocks has improved continuously since the first prototype in the 1950s. The first generation of atomic clocks were based on measuring caesium, rubidium, and hydrogen atoms. In a time period from 1959 to 1998, NIST developed a series of seven caesium-133 microwave clocks, the NBS-1 to NBS-6, and the NIST-7 after the National Bureau of Standards changed to its current name. The first clock had an accuracy of 10^{−11}, increasing to 10^{−15}, or one per quadrillion, for the last clock. The clocks were the first to use a caesium fountain, which was introduced by Jerrod Zacharias, and laser cooling of atoms, which was demonstrated by Dave Wineland and his colleagues in 1978.

The next step in atomic clock advances involves going from accuracies of 10^{−15} to accuracies of 10^{−18} and even 10^{−19}. (Note: Researchers at the University of Wisconsin-Madison have demonstrated a clock that will not lose a second in 300 billion years.) The goal is to redefine the second when clocks become so accurate that they will not lose or gain more than a second in the age of the universe. (Note: One second in 13.8 billion years, the age of the universe, is an accuracy of 2.3×10^{−18}.) To do so, scientists must demonstrate the accuracy of clocks that use strontium and ytterbium and optical lattice technology. Such clocks are also called optical clocks where the energy level transitions used are in the optical regime (giving rise to even higher oscillation frequency), which thus, have much higher accuracy as compared to traditional atomic clocks.

The goal of an atomic clock with 10^{−16} accuracy was first reached at the United Kingdom's National Physical Laboratory's NPL-CsF2 caesium fountain clock and the United States' NIST-F2. The increase in precision from NIST-F1 to NIST-F2 is due to liquid nitrogen cooling of the microwave interaction region; the largest source of uncertainty in NIST-F1 is the effect of black-body radiation from the warm chamber walls.

The performance of primary and secondary frequency standards contributing to International Atomic Time (TAI) is evaluated. The evaluation reports of individual (mainly primary) clocks are published online by the International Bureau of Weights and Measures (BIPM).

== Comparing atomic clocks ==
=== Time standards ===
A number of national metrology laboratories maintain atomic clocks: including Paris Observatory, the Physikalisch-Technische Bundesanstalt (PTB) in Germany, the National Institute of Standards and Technology (NIST) in Colorado and Maryland, USA, JILA in the University of Colorado Boulder, the National Physical Laboratory (NPL) in the United Kingdom, and the All-Russian Scientific Research Institute for Physical-Engineering and Radiotechnical Metrology (VNIIFTRI). They do this by designing and building frequency standards that produce electric oscillations at a frequency whose relationship to the transition frequency of caesium 133 is known, in order to achieve a very low uncertainty. These primary frequency standards estimate and correct various frequency shifts, including relativistic Doppler shifts linked to atomic motion, the thermal radiation of the environment (blackbody shift) and several other factors. The best primary standards currently produce the SI second with an accuracy approaching an uncertainty of one part in 10^{16}.

At this level of accuracy, the differences in the gravitational field in the device cannot be ignored. The standard is then considered in the framework of general relativity to provide a proper time at a specific point.

Atomic time standards such as International Atomic Time (TAI) and Coordinated Universal Time (UTC) are disseminated to the public through satellite navigation systems, radio time signals, and network-based time services. In addition to official time authority websites, publicly accessible reference tools exist that allow users to compare the time reported by local computer systems with UTC obtained from national metrology institute time servers, such as those operated by the National Institute of Standards and Technology (NIST). These tools can be used to observe clock deviation and synchronization discrepancies in end-user devices.

The International Bureau of Weights and Measures (BIPM) provides a list of frequencies that serve as secondary representations of the second. This list contains the frequency values and respective standard uncertainties for the rubidium microwave transition and other optical transitions, including neutral atoms and single trapped ions. These secondary frequency standards can be as accurate as one part in 10^{18}; however, the uncertainties in the list are one part in 10^{14}–10^{16}. This is because the uncertainty in the central caesium standard against which the secondary standards are calibrated is one part in 10^{14}–10^{16}.

Primary frequency standards can be used to calibrate the frequency of other clocks used in national laboratories. These are usually commercial caesium clocks having very good long-term frequency stability, maintaining a frequency with a stability better than 1 part in 10^{14} over a few months. The uncertainty of the primary standard frequencies is around one part in 10^{13}.

Hydrogen masers, which rely on the 1.4 GHz hyperfine transition in atomic hydrogen, are also used in time metrology laboratories. Masers outperform any commercial caesium clock in terms of short-term frequency stability. In the past, these instruments have been used in all applications that require a steady reference across time periods of less than one day (frequency stability of about 1 part in ten for averaging times of a few hours). Because some active hydrogen masers have a modest but predictable frequency drift with time, they have become an important part of the BIPM's ensemble of commercial clocks that implement International Atomic Time.

=== Synchronization with satellites ===
The time readings of clocks operated in metrology labs operating with the BIPM need to be known very accurately. Some operations require synchronization of atomic clocks separated by great distances over thousands of kilometers. Global Navigational Satellite Systems (GNSS) provide a satisfactory solution to the problem of time transfer. Atomic clocks are used to broadcast time signals in the United States Global Positioning System (GPS), the Russian Federation's Global Navigation Satellite System (GLONASS), the European Union's Galileo system and China's BeiDou system.

The signal received from one satellite in a metrology laboratory equipped with a receiver with an accurately known position allows the time difference between the local time scale and the GNSS system time to be determined with an uncertainty of a few nanoseconds when averaged over 15 minutes. Receivers allow the simultaneous reception of signals from several satellites, and make use of signals transmitted on two frequencies. As more satellites are launched and start operations, time measurements will become more accurate.

These methods of time comparison must make corrections for the effects of special relativity and general relativity of a few nanoseconds.

In June 2015, the National Physical Laboratory (NPL) in Teddington, UK; the French department of Time-Space Reference Systems at the Paris Observatory (LNE-SYRTE); the German German National Metrology Institute (PTB) in Braunschweig; and Italy's Istituto Nazionale di Ricerca Metrologica (INRiM) in Turin labs started tests to improve the accuracy of satellite comparisons by a factor of 10, but still be limited to one part in 1×10^{16}. These four European labs are developing and host a variety of experimental optical clocks that harness different elements in different experimental set-ups and want to compare their optical clocks against each other and check whether they agree.

=== International timekeeping ===
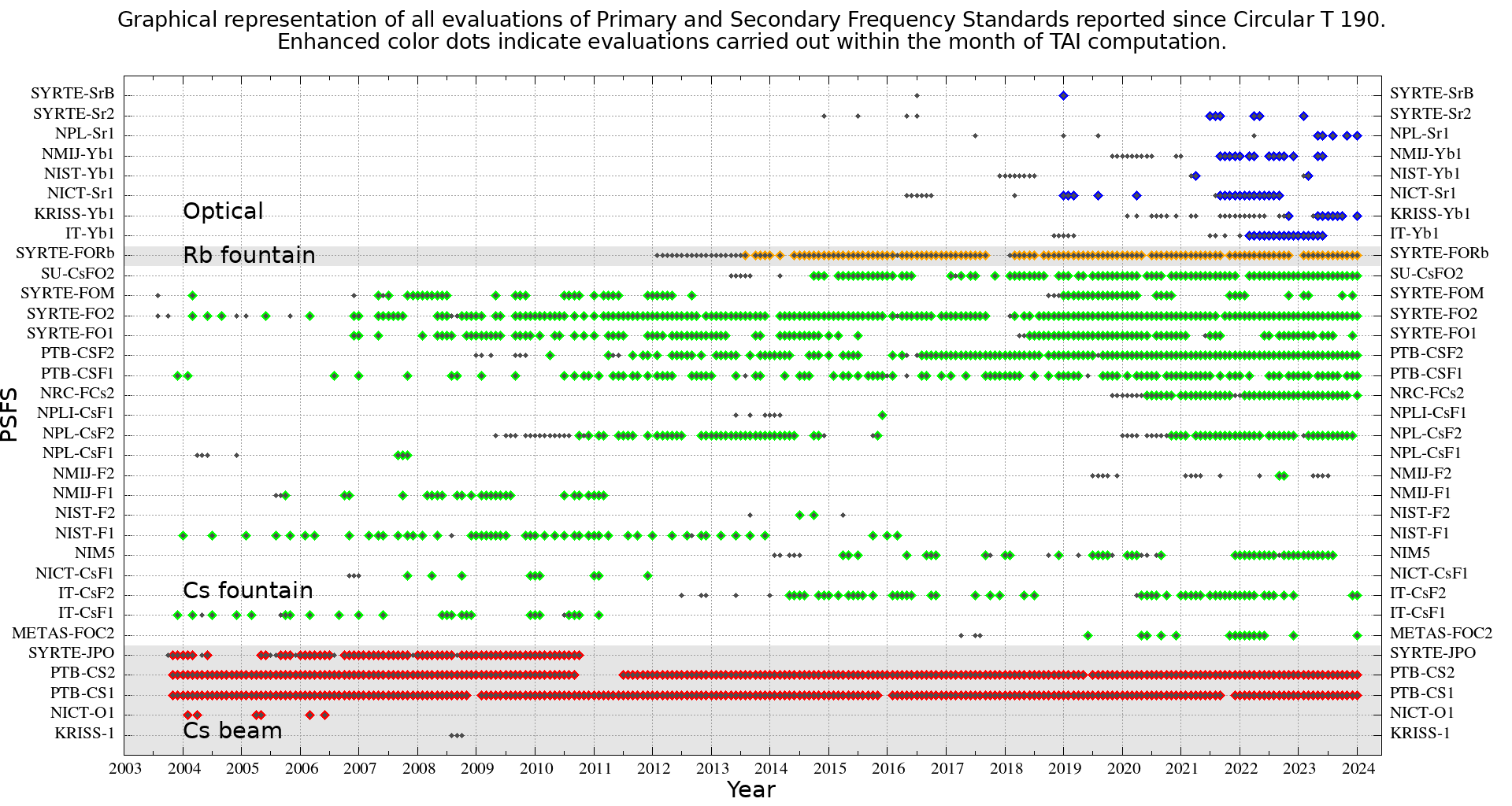
Data points representing atomic clocks around the world that define International Atomic Time (TAI)

National laboratories usually operate a range of clocks. These are operated independently of one another and their measurements are sometimes combined to generate a scale that is more stable and more accurate than that of any individual contributing clock. This scale allows for time comparisons between different clocks in the laboratory. These atomic time scales are generally referred to as TA(k) for laboratory k.

Coordinated Universal Time (UTC) is the result of comparing clocks in national laboratories around the world to International Atomic Time (TAI), then adding leap seconds as necessary. TAI is a weighted average of around 450 clocks in some 80 time institutions. The relative stability of TAI is around one part in 10^{16}.

Before TAI is published, the frequency of the result is compared with the SI second at various primary and secondary frequency standards. This requires relativistic corrections to be applied to the location of the primary standard which depend on the distance between the equal gravity potential and the rotating geoid of Earth. The values of the rotating geoid and the TAI change slightly each month and are available in the BIPM Circular T publication. The TAI time-scale is deferred by a few weeks as the average of atomic clocks around the world is calculated.

TAI is not distributed in everyday timekeeping. Instead, an integer number of leap seconds are added or subtracted to correct for the Earth's rotation, producing UTC. The number of leap seconds is changed so that mean solar noon at the prime meridian (Greenwich) does not deviate from UTC noon by more than 0.9 seconds.

National metrology institutions maintain an approximation of UTC referred to as UTC(k) for laboratory k. UTC(k) is distributed by the BIPM's Consultative Committee for Time and Frequency. The offset UTC-UTC(k) is calculated every 5 days, the results are published monthly. Atomic clocks record UTC(k) to no more than 100 nanoseconds. In some countries, UTC(k) is the legal time that is distributed by radio, television, telephone, Internet, fiber-optic cables, time signal transmitters, and speaking clocks. In addition, GNSS provides time information accurate to a few tens of nanoseconds or better.

=== Fiber optics ===
In a next phase, these labs strive to transmit comparison signals in the visible spectrum through fibre-optic cables. This will allow their experimental optical clocks to be compared with an accuracy similar to the expected accuracies of the optical clocks themselves. Some of these labs have already established fibre-optic links, and tests have begun on sections between Paris and Teddington, and Paris and Braunschweig. Fibre-optic links between experimental optical clocks also exist between the American NIST lab and its partner lab JILA, both in Boulder, Colorado but these span much shorter distances than the European network and are between just two labs. According to Fritz Riehle, a physicist at PTB, "Europe is in a unique position as it has a high density of the best clocks in the world".

In August 2016 the French LNE-SYRTE in Paris and the German PTB in Braunschweig reported the comparison and agreement of two fully independent experimental strontium lattice optical clocks in Paris and Braunschweig at an uncertainty of 5×10^{−17} via a newly established phase-coherent frequency link connecting Paris and Braunschweig, using 1,415 km (879 mi) of telecom fibre-optic cable. The fractional uncertainty of the whole link was assessed to be 2.5×10^{−19}, making comparisons of even more accurate clocks possible.

In 2021, NIST compared transmission of signals from a series of experimental atomic clocks located about 1.5 km (1 mi) apart at the NIST lab, its partner lab JILA, and the University of Colorado all in Boulder, Colorado over air and fiber optic cable to a precision of 8×10^{−18}.

== Microwave atomic clocks ==
=== Caesium ===
The SI second is defined as a certain number of unperturbed ground-state hyperfine transitions of the caesium-133 atom. Caesium standards are therefore regarded as primary time and frequency standards.

Caesium clocks include the NIST-F1 clock, developed in 1999, and the NIST-F2 clock, developed in 2013.

Caesium has several properties that make it a good choice for an atomic clock. Whereas a hydrogen atom moves at 1,600 m/s at room temperature and a nitrogen atom moves at 510 m/s, a caesium atom moves at a much slower speed of 130 m/s due to its greater mass. The hyperfine frequency of caesium (~9.19 GHz) is also higher than other elements such as rubidium (~6.8 GHz) and hydrogen (~1.4 GHz). The high frequency of caesium allows for more accurate measurements. Caesium reference tubes suitable for national standards currently last about seven years and cost about US$35,000. Primary frequency and time standards like the United States Time Standard atomic clocks, NIST-F1 and NIST-F2, use far higher power.

==== Block diagram ====
In a caesium beam frequency reference, timing signals are derived from a high stability voltage-controlled quartz crystal oscillator (VCXO) that is tunable over a narrow range. The output frequency of the VCXO (typically 5 MHz) is multiplied by a frequency synthesizer to obtain microwaves at the frequency of the caesium atomic hyperfine transition (about 9192.6317 MHz). The output of the frequency synthesizer is amplified and applied to a chamber containing caesium gas which absorbs the microwaves. The output current of the caesium chamber increases as absorption increases.

The remainder of the circuitry simply adjusts the running frequency of the VCXO to maximize the output current of the caesium chamber which keeps the oscillator tuned to the resonance frequency of the hyperfine transition.

=== Rubidium ===
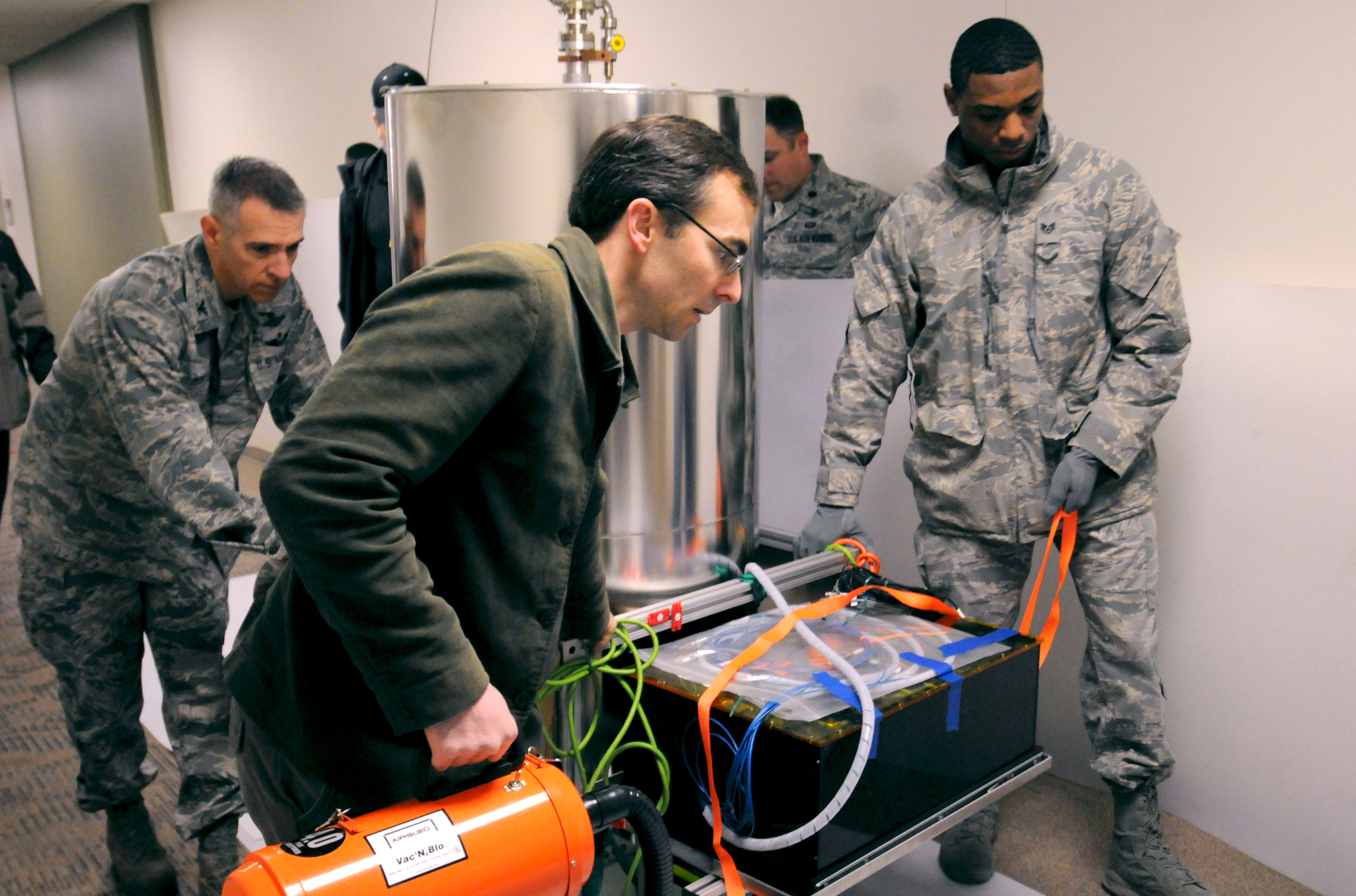
A team of United States Air Force airmen carrying a rubidium clock

The BIPM defines the unperturbed ground-state hyperfine transition frequency of the rubidium-87 atom; 6,834,682,610.9043126 Hz; in terms of the caesium standard frequency. Atomic clocks based on rubidium standards are therefore regarded as secondary representations of the second.

The advantages of rubidium atomic clocks are their low cost, small size (commercial standards are as small as 1.7×10^{5} mm^{3}) and short-term stability. They are used in many commercial, portable and aerospace applications. Modern rubidium standard tubes last more than ten years, and can cost as little as US$50. Some commercial applications use a rubidium standard periodically corrected by a global positioning system receiver (see GPS-disciplined oscillator). This achieves excellent short-term accuracy, with long-term accuracy equal to (and traceable to) the US national time standards.

=== Hydrogen ===
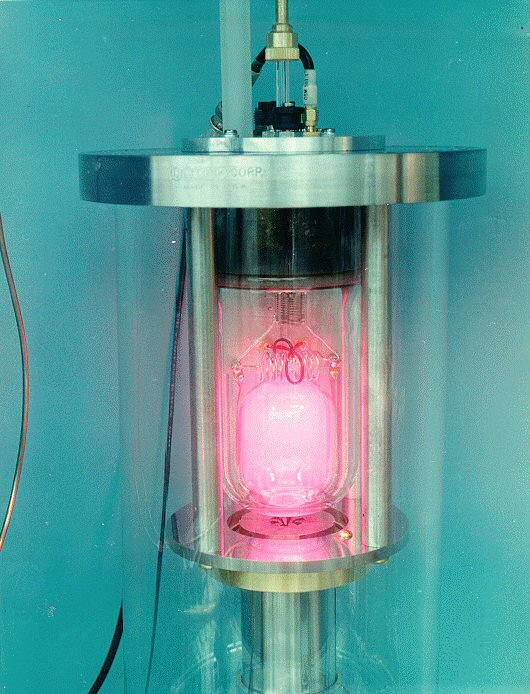
A hydrogen maser

The BIPM defines the unperturbed optical transition frequency of the hydrogen-1 neutral atom; 1,233,030,706,593,514 Hz; in terms of the caesium standard frequency. Atomic clocks based on hydrogen standards are therefore regarded as secondary representations of the second.

Hydrogen masers have superior short-term stability compared to other standards, but lower long-term accuracy. The long-term stability of hydrogen maser standards decreases because of changes in the cavity's properties over time. The relative error of hydrogen masers is 5 × 10^{−16} for periods of 1000 seconds. This makes hydrogen masers good for radio astronomy, in particular for very long baseline interferometry.

Hydrogen masers are used for flywheel oscillators in laser-cooled atomic frequency standards and broadcasting time signals from national standards laboratories, although they need to be corrected as they drift from the correct frequency over time. The hydrogen maser is also useful for experimental tests of the effects of special relativity and general relativity such as gravitational red shift.

== Other types of atomic clocks ==
=== Optical clocks ===
Optical clocks operate similarly to microwave clocks, but at much higher frequencies, around 10^{15} Hz rather than the 10^{10} Hz range of microwave clocks. The advantage of optical clocks can be explained by the statement that the instability $\sigma\propto \frac{\Delta f}{f} \frac{1}{S/N}$, where $\sigma$ is the instability, f is the frequency, and S/N is the signal-to-noise ratio. This leads to the equation $\sigma(\tau)=\frac{1}{2 \pi f \sqrt{N T_{int} \tau}}$.

Optical clocks are based on forbidden optical transitions in ions or atoms, with a natural linewidth $\Delta f$ of typically 1 Hz, so the Q-factor is about 10^{15}. Compared to microwave clocks, the 10^{5} times higher frequency gives better stability, which means that they can facilitate evaluation of lower uncertainties. The faster "ticking" also gives better time resolution for short intervals.

Optical clocks were enabled by the development of the frequency comb, which allowed cycle-exact counting of these extremely high optical frequencies. Optical clocks use either a single ion, multiple ions in a Coulomb crystal (see Coulomb crystal clock) or an optical lattice with 10^{4}–10^{6} atoms.

=== Nuclear clocks ===
A further variation on the optical atomic clock being developed the use of a nuclear energy transition (between different nuclear isomers) rather than the atomic electron transitions which current atomic clocks measure. Most nuclear transitions operate at far too high a frequency to be measured, but the exceptionally low excitation energy of ^{229m}Th produces "gamma rays" in the ultraviolet frequency range. In 2003, Ekkehard Peik and Christian Tamm noted this makes a clock possible with current optical frequency-measurement techniques. In 2012, it was shown that a nuclear clock based on a single ^{229}Th^{3+} ion could provide a total fractional frequency inaccuracy of 1.5×10^{−19}, which was better than existing 2019 optical atomic clock technology.

Although neutral ^{229m}Th atoms decay in microseconds by internal conversion, this pathway is energetically prohibited in ^{229m}Th^{+} ions, as the second and higher ionization energy is greater than the nuclear excitation energy, giving ^{229m}Th^{+} ions a long half-life on the order of 10^{3} s. It is the large ratio between transition frequency and isomer lifetime which gives the clock a high quality factor.

The extremely high quality factor also makes the transition frequency very difficult to find, and the 2010s were spent searching for it. A sufficiently precise measurement was finally achieved in 2024 as 2,020,407,384,335±2 kHz. The first experimental optical nuclear clocks were announced in June 2026. They are not yet competitive with other atomic clocks, but development is expected to be rapid.

A nuclear energy transition offers the following potential advantages:

1. Higher frequency. All other things being equal, a higher-frequency transition offers greater stability for simple statistical reasons (fluctuations are averaged over more cycles).
2. Insensitivity to environmental effects. Due to its small size and the shielding effect of the surrounding electrons, an atomic nucleus is much less sensitive to ambient electromagnetic fields than is an electron in an orbital.
3. Greater number of atoms. Because of the aforementioned insensitivity to ambient fields, it is not necessary to have the clock atoms well-separated in a dilute gas. Current measurements take advantage of the Mössbauer effect and place the thorium ions in a solid, which allows billions of atoms to be interrogated.

== Potential for redefining the second ==
In 2022, the best realisation of the second is done with primary standard clocks which work by laser-cooling a cloud of caesium atoms to one microkelvin (10^{−6} K) in a magneto-optic trap. These cold atoms are then launched vertically by laser light. The atoms then undergo Ramsey excitation in a microwave cavity. The fraction of excited atoms is then detected by laser beams. These clocks have 5×10^{−16} systematic uncertainty, which is equivalent to 50 picoseconds per day. A system of several fountains worldwide contributes to International Atomic Time. These caesium clocks also underpin optical frequency measurements.

Optical clocks are based on forbidden optical transitions in ions or atoms. They have frequencies around 10^{15} Hz, with a natural linewidth $\Delta f$ of typically 1 Hz, so the Q-factor is about 10^{15}, or even higher. They have better stabilities than microwave clocks, which means that they can facilitate evaluation of lower uncertainties. They also have better time resolution, which means the clock "ticks" faster. Optical clocks use either a single ion, or an optical lattice with 10^{4}–10^{6} atoms.

=== Rydberg constant ===
A definition based on the Rydberg constant would involve fixing the value to a certain value: $R_{\infty}=\frac{m_\text{e} e^4}{8 \varepsilon_0^2 h^3 c}=\frac{m_\text{e} c \alpha^2}{2h}$. The Rydberg constant describes the energy levels in a hydrogen atom with the nonrelativistic approximation $E_n \approx -\frac{R_{\infty} c h}{n^2}$.

The only viable way to fix the Rydberg constant involves trapping and cooling hydrogen. This is difficult because it is very light and the atoms move very fast, causing Doppler shifts. The radiation needed to cool the hydrogen – 121.5 nm – is also difficult. Another hurdle involves improving the uncertainty in QED calculations, specifically the Lamb shift in the 1s-2s transition of the hydrogen atom.

In the Report of the 25th meeting of the Consultative Committee for Units (2021), 3 options were considered for the redefinition of the second sometime around 2026, 2030, or 2034. The first redefinition approach considered was a definition based on a single atomic reference transition. The second redefinition approach considered was a definition based on a collection of frequencies. The third redefinition approach considered was a definition based on fixing the numerical value of a fundamental constant, such as making the Rydberg constant the basis for the definition. The committee concluded there was no feasible way to redefine the second with the third option, since no physical constant is known to enough digits currently to enable realizing the second with a constant.

=== Requirements ===
A redefinition must include improved optical clock reliability. TAI must be contributed to by optical clocks before the BIPM affirms a redefinition. A consistent method of communicating the resultant signals, such as fibre optics, must be developed before the second is redefined.

=== Secondary representations of the second ===
Representations of the second other than the SI cesium standard are motivated by the increasing accuracy of other atomic clocks. In particular the high frequencies and small linewidths of optical clocks promise significantly improved signal-to-noise ratio and instability. Further secondary representations would aid in the preparation of a future redefinition of the second.

A list of frequencies recommended for secondary representations of the second is maintained by the International Bureau of Weights and Measures (BIPM) since 2006 and is available online. The list contains the frequency values and the respective standard uncertainties for the rubidium microwave transition and for several optical transitions. These secondary frequency standards are accurate at the level of 10^{−18}; however, the uncertainties provided in the list are in the range 10^{−14} – 10^{−15} since they are limited by the linking to the caesium primary standard that currently (2018) defines the second.

Type	Working frequency (Hz)	Relative Allan deviation (typical clocks)	Reference
^{133}Cs	9.192631770×10^{9} by definition	10^{−13}	
^{87}Rb	6.834682610904324×10^{9}	10^{−12}	
^{1}H	1.4204057517667×10^{9}	10^{−15}	
Optical clock (^{87}Sr)	4.292280042298734×10^{14}	10^{−17}	
Optical clock (^{27}Al^{+})	1.12101539320785916×10^{15}	10^{−18}	
Optical clock (^{171}Yb^{+}, 642 THz)	6.4212149677264512×10^{14}	10^{−18}	
Optical clock (^{171}Yb^{+}, 688 THz)	6.8835897930930824×10^{14}	10^{−16}	

Twenty-first century experimental atomic clocks that provide non-caesium-based secondary representations of the second are becoming so precise that they are likely to be used as extremely sensitive detectors for other things besides measuring frequency and time. For example, the frequency of atomic clocks is altered slightly by gravity, magnetic fields, electrical fields, force, motion, temperature and other phenomena. The experimental clocks tend to continue to improve, and leadership in performance has shifted back and forth between various types of experimental clocks.

== Applications ==
Atomic clocks and their usage in GPS, by Bill Hammack

The development of atomic clocks has led to many scientific and technological advances such as precise global and regional navigation satellite systems, and applications in the Internet, which depend critically on frequency and time standards. Atomic clocks are installed at sites of time signal radio transmitters. They are used at some long-wave and medium-wave broadcasting stations to deliver a very precise carrier frequency. Atomic clocks are used in many scientific disciplines, such as for long-baseline interferometry in radio astronomy.

=== Global navigation satellite systems ===
The Global Positioning System (GPS) operated by the United States Space Force provides very accurate timing and frequency signals. A GPS receiver works by measuring the relative time delay of signals from a minimum of four, but usually more, GPS satellites, each of which has at least two onboard caesium and as many as two rubidium atomic clocks. The relative times are mathematically transformed into three absolute spatial coordinates and one absolute time coordinate. GPS Time (GPST) is a continuous time scale and theoretically accurate to about 14 nanoseconds. However, most receivers lose accuracy in the interpretation of the signals and are only accurate to 100 nanoseconds.

GPST is related to but differs from TAI (International Atomic Time) and UTC (Coordinated Universal Time). GPST remains at a constant offset from TAI (TAI – GPST = 19 seconds) and like TAI does not implement leap seconds. Periodic corrections are performed to the on-board clocks in the satellites to keep them synchronized with ground clocks. The GPS navigation message includes the difference between GPST and UTC. As of July 2015, GPST is 17 seconds ahead of UTC because of the leap second added to UTC on 30 June 2015. Receivers subtract this offset from GPS Time to calculate UTC.

The GLObal NAvigation Satellite System (GLONASS) operated by the Russian Aerospace Defence Forces provides an alternative to the Global Positioning System (GPS) system and is the second navigational system in operation with global coverage and of comparable precision. GLONASS Time (GLONASST) is generated by the GLONASS Central Synchroniser and is typically better than 1,000 nanoseconds. Unlike GPS, the GLONASS time scale implements leap seconds, like UTC.

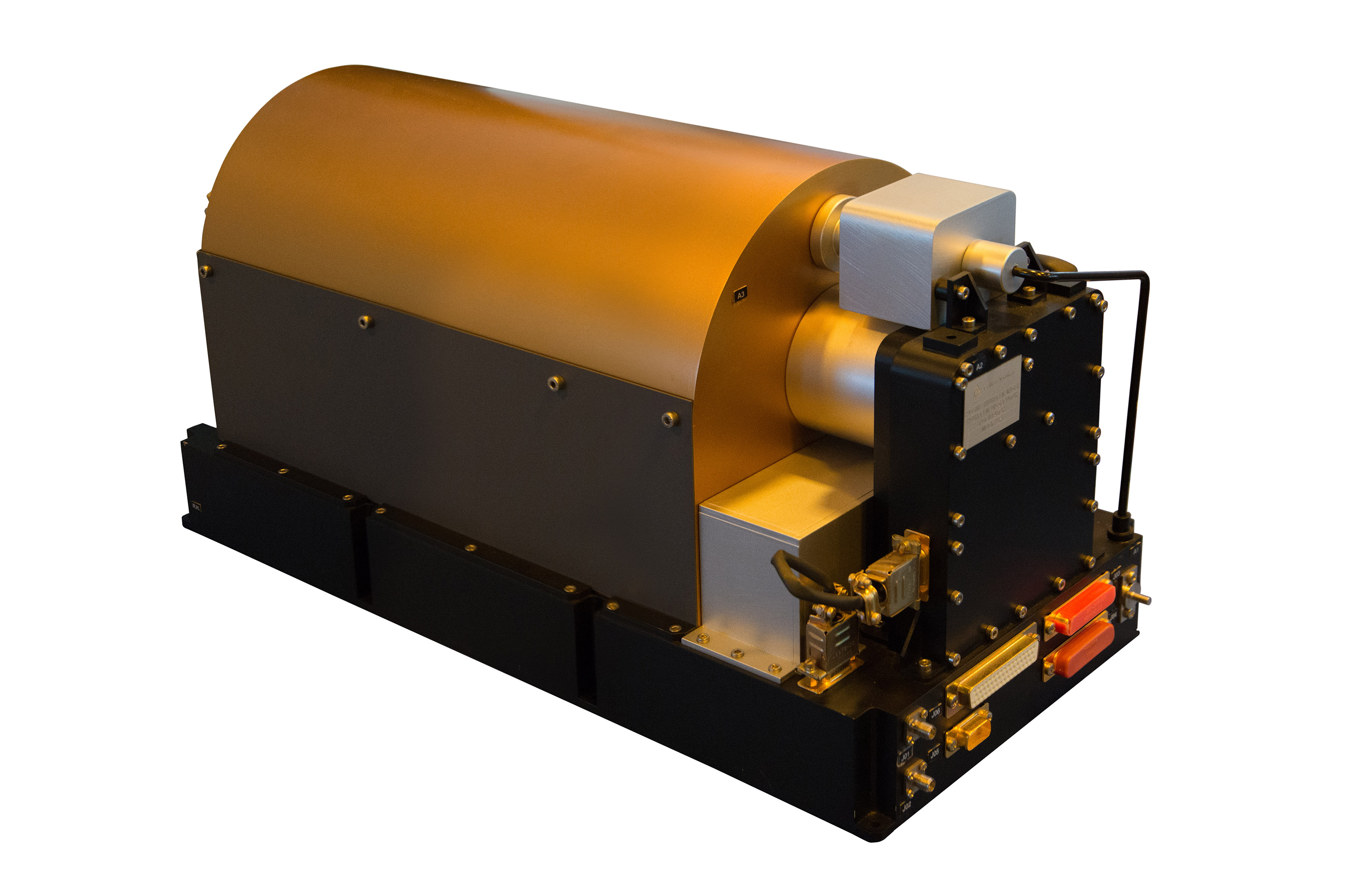
Space Passive Hydrogen Maser used in ESA Galileo satellites as a master clock for an onboard timing system

The Galileo Global Navigation Satellite System is operated by the European GNSS Agency and European Space Agency. Galileo started offering global Early Operational Capability (EOC) on 15 December 2016, providing the third, and first non-military operated, global navigation satellite system. Galileo System Time (GST) is a continuous time scale which is generated on the ground at the Galileo Control Centre in Fucino, Italy, by the Precise Timing Facility, based on averages of different atomic clocks and maintained by the Galileo Central Segment and synchronised with TAI with a nominal offset below 50 nanoseconds. According to the European GNSS Agency, Galileo offers 30 nanoseconds timing accuracy.

The March 2018 Quarterly Performance Report by the European GNSS Service Centre reported the UTC Time Dissemination Service Accuracy was ≤ 7.6 nanoseconds, computed by accumulating samples over the previous 12 months, and exceeding the ≤ 30 ns target. Each Galileo satellite has two passive hydrogen maser and two rubidium atomic clocks for onboard timing.

The Galileo navigation message includes the differences between GST, UTC and GPST, to promote interoperability. In the summer of 2021, the European Union settled on a passive hydrogen maser for the second generation of Galileo satellites, starting in 2023, with an expected lifetime of 12 years per satellite. The masers are about 2 feet long with a weight of 40 pounds.

The BeiDou-2/BeiDou-3 satellite navigation system is operated by the China National Space Administration. BeiDou Time (BDT) is a continuous time scale starting at 1 January 2006 at 0:00:00 UTC and is synchronised with UTC within 100 ns. BeiDou became operational in China in December 2011, with 10 satellites in use, and began offering services to customers in the Asia-Pacific region in December 2012. On 27 December 2018 the BeiDou Navigation Satellite System started to provide global services with a reported timing accuracy of 20 ns. The final, 35th, BeiDou-3 satellite for global coverage was launched into orbit on 23 June 2020.

==== Experimental space clock ====
In April 2015, NASA announced that it planned to deploy a Deep Space Atomic Clock (DSAC), a miniaturized, ultra-precise mercury-ion atomic clock, into outer space. NASA said that the DSAC would be much more stable than other navigational clocks. The clock was successfully launched on 25 June 2019, activated on 23 August 2019 and deactivated two years later on 18 September 2021.

==== Military usage ====
In 2022, DARPA announced a drive to upgrade to the U.S. military timekeeping systems for greater precision over time when sensors do not have access to GPS satellites, with a plan to reach precision of 1 part in 10^{12}. The Robust Optical Clock Network will balance usability and accuracy as it is developed over 4 years.

=== Time signal radio transmitters ===
A radio clock is a clock that automatically synchronizes itself by means of radio time signals received by a radio receiver. Some manufacturers may label radio clocks as atomic clocks, because the radio signals they receive originate from atomic clocks. Normal low-cost consumer-grade receivers that rely on the amplitude-modulated time signals have a practical accuracy uncertainty of ± 0.1 second. This is sufficient for many consumer applications. Instrument grade time receivers provide higher accuracy. Radio clocks incur a propagation delay of approximately 1 ms for every 300 kilometres (186 mi) of distance from the radio transmitter. Many governments operate transmitters for timekeeping purposes.

=== General relativity ===
General relativity predicts that clocks tick slower deeper in a gravitational field, and this gravitational redshift effect has been well documented. Atomic clocks are effective at testing general relativity on ever smaller scales. A project to observe twelve atomic clocks from 11 November 1999 to October 2014 resulted in a further demonstration that Einstein's theory of general relativity is accurate at small scales.

In 2021 a team of scientists at JILA measured the difference in the passage of time due to gravitational redshift between two layers of atoms separated by one millimeter using a strontium optical clock cooled to 100 nanokelvins with a precision of 7.6×10^{−21} seconds. Given its quantum nature and the fact that time is a relativistic quantity, atomic clocks can be used to see how time is influenced by general relativity and quantum mechanics at the same time.

=== Financial systems ===
Atomic clocks keep accurate records of transactions between buyers and sellers to the millisecond or better, particularly in high-frequency trading. Accurate timekeeping is needed to prevent illegal trading ahead of time, in addition to ensuring fairness to traders on the other side of the globe. In 2018, the then current system known as NTP is only accurate to a millisecond.

=== Transportable Optical Clocks ===
Many of the most accurate optical clocks are big and only available in large metrology labs. Thus they are not readily useful for space-limited factories or other industrial environments that could use an atomic clock for GPS accuracy.

Researchers have designed a strontium optical lattice clock that can be moved around in an air-conditioned car trailer. They achieved a relative uncertainty of 7.4×10^{−17} compared to a stationary one.

== Manufacturers ==
Manufacturers of atomic clocks in use for keeping track of UTC includes Microchip, T4Science, Anritsu, Microsemi and HP.

== See also ==
- Caesium standard
- Clock drift
- Dick effect
- List of atomic clocks
- Network Time Protocol
- Optical clock
- Primary Atomic Reference Clock in Space
- Pulsar clock
- Speaking clock
- Time metrology
- Time transfer
- Laser cooling
