= Ultracold atom =

Atoms kept at temperatures close to absolute zero

In condensed matter physics, ultracold atoms are atomic gases with a temperature near absolute zero. At such temperatures, the atoms quantum-mechanical properties become important, especially through what is known as superfluidity, a phenomenon also displayed by Superfluid Helium 4.

To reach such low temperatures, a combination of several techniques typically has to be used. First, atoms are trapped and pre-cooled via laser cooling in a magneto-optical trap. To reach the lowest possible temperature, further cooling is performed using evaporative cooling in a magnetic or optical trap. Several Nobel prizes in physics are related to the development of the techniques to manipulate quantum properties of individual atoms (e.g. 1989, 1996, 1997, 2001, 2005, 2012, 2018).

Experiments with ultracold atoms study a variety of phenomena, including quantum phase transitions, Bose–Einstein condensation (BEC), bosonic superfluidity, quantum magnetism, many-body spin dynamics, Efimov states , Bardeen–Cooper–Schrieffer (BCS) superfluidity and the BEC–BCS crossover. Some of these research directions utilize ultracold atom systems as quantum simulators to study the physics of other systems, including the unitary Fermi gas and the Ising and Hubbard models. Ultracold atoms could also be used for realization of quantum computers.

== History ==
Samples of ultracold atoms are typically prepared through the interactions of a dilute gas with a laser field. Evidence for radiation pressure, force due to light on atoms, was demonstrated independently by Lebedev, and Nichols and Hull in 1901. In 1933, Otto Frisch demonstrated the deflection of individual sodium particles by light generated from a sodium lamp.

The invention of the laser spurred the development of additional techniques to manipulate atoms with light. Using laser light to cool atoms was first proposed in 1975 by taking advantage of the Doppler effect to make the radiation force on an atom dependent on its velocity, a technique known as Doppler cooling. Similar ideas were also proposed to cool samples of trapped ions. Applying Doppler cooling in three dimensions will slow atoms to velocities that are typically a few cm/s and produce what is known as an optical molasses.

Typically, the source of neutral atoms for these experiments were thermal ovens which produced atoms at temperatures of a few hundred kelvins. The atoms from these oven sources are moving at hundred of meters per second. One of the major technical challenges in Doppler cooling was increasing the amount of time an atom can interact with the laser light. This challenge was overcome by the introduction of a Zeeman Slower. A Zeeman Slower uses a spatially varying magnetic field to maintain the relative energy spacing of the atomic transitions involved in Doppler cooling. This increases the amount of time the atom spends interacting with the laser light. Experiments can also use metal dispensers, which are pure metal (typically alkali metals) rods that can emit when heated up (the vapor pressure is higher) with electrical current.

The development of the first magneto-optical trap (MOT) by Raab et al. in 1987 was an important step towards the creation of samples of ultracold atoms. Typical temperatures achieved with a MOT are tens to hundreds of microkelvins. In essence, a magneto optical trap confines atoms in space by applying a magnetic field so that lasers not only provide a velocity dependent force but also a spatially varying force. The 1997 Nobel prize in physics was awarded for development of methods to cool and trap atoms with laser light and was shared by Steven Chu, Claude Cohen-Tannoudji and William D. Phillips.

Evaporative cooling was used in experimental efforts to reach lower temperatures in an effort to discover a new state of matter predicted by Satyendra Nath Bose and Albert Einstein known as a Bose–Einstein condensate (BEC). In evaporative cooling, the hottest atoms in a sample are allowed to escape which reduces the average temperature of the sample. The Nobel Prize in 2001 was awarded to Eric A. Cornell, Wolfgang Ketterle and Carl E. Wieman for the achievement of Bose–Einstein condensate in dilute gases of alkali atoms, and for early fundamental studies of the properties of the condensates.

In recent years a variety of sub-Doppler cooling techniques, including polarization gradient cooling, gray molasses cooling, and Raman sideband cooling, have enabled the cooling and trapping of single atoms in optical tweezers. Experimental platforms leveraging ultracold neutral atoms in optical tweezers and optical lattices have become an increasingly popular setting for studying quantum computing, quantum simulation, and precision metrology. Atoms with closed cycling transitions, capable of scattering many photons with a low probability of decay into other states, are common choices of species for ultracold neutral atom experiments. The lowest-energy fine structure transitions in alkali atoms enable fluorescence imaging, while a combination of hyperfine and Zeeman sublevels can be used for implementing sub-Doppler cooling. Alkaline earth atoms have also gained popularity owing to narrow-linewidth cooling transitions and ultra-narrow optical clock transitions.

== Applications ==
Ultracold atoms have a variety of applications owing to their unique quantum properties and the great experimental control available in such systems. For instance, ultracold atoms have been proposed as a platform for quantum computation and quantum simulation, accompanied by very active experimental research to achieve these goals.

Quantum simulation is of great interest in the context of condensed matter physics, where it may provide valuable insights into the properties of interacting quantum systems. The ultracold atoms are used to implement an analogue of the condensed matter system of interest, which can then be explored using the tools available in the particular implementation. Since these tools may differ greatly from those available in the actual condensed matter system, one can thus experimentally probe otherwise inaccessible quantities. Furthermore, ultracold atoms may even allow to create exotic states of matter, which cannot otherwise be observed in nature.

All atoms are identical, making ensembles of atoms ideal for universal timekeeping. In 1967, the SI definition of the second was changed to reference a hyperfine transition frequency in Cesium atoms. Atomic clocks based on alkaline earth atoms or alkaline earth like ions (such as Al^{+}) have now been developed making use of narrow-line optical transitions. To achieve high numbers of non-interacting atoms, which assists in the precision of these clocks, neutral atoms can be trapped in optical lattices. On the other hand, ion traps permit long interrogation times.

Ultracold atoms are also used in experiments for precision measurements enabled by the low thermal noise and, in some cases, by exploiting quantum mechanics to exceed the standard quantum limit. In addition to potential technical applications, such precision measurements may serve as tests of our current understanding of physics.

== See also ==
- Bose–Einstein condensate
- Cold Atom Laboratory
- Quantum simulator

== Sources ==
- Bloch, Immanuel (2008). "Quantum Gases". Science. 319 (5867): 1202–1203. Bibcode:2008Sci...319.1202B. doi:10.1126/science.1152501. PMID 18309072. S2CID 28871617.
- Rousseau, Valery (2010). "Pure Mott Phases in Confined Ultracold Atomic Systems". Phys. Rev. Lett. 104 (16) 167201. arXiv:0909.3543. Bibcode:2010PhRvL.104p7201R. doi:10.1103/PhysRevLett.104.167201. PMID 20482076. S2CID 9940436.
