= Gray molasses =

Method of sub-Doppler laser cooling of atoms

Gray molasses is a method of sub-Doppler laser cooling of atoms. It employs principles from Sisyphus cooling in conjunction with a so-called "dark" state whose transition to the excited state is not addressed by the resonant lasers. Ultracold atomic physics experiments on atomic species with poorly-resolved hyperfine structure, like isotopes of lithium and potassium, often utilize gray molasses instead of Sisyphus cooling as a secondary cooling stage after the ubiquitous magneto-optical trap (MOT) to achieve temperatures below the Doppler limit. Unlike a MOT, which combines a molasses force with a confining force, a gray molasses can only slow but not trap atoms; hence, its efficacy as a cooling mechanism lasts only milliseconds before further cooling and trapping stages must be employed.

== Overview ==
Like Sisyphus cooling, the cooling mechanism of gray molasses relies on a two-photon Raman-type transition between two hyperfine-split ground states mediated by an excited state. Orthogonal superpositions of these ground states constitute "bright" and "dark" states, so called since the former couples to the excited state via dipole transitions driven by the laser, and the latter is only accessible via spontaneous emission from the excited state. As neither are eigenstates of the kinetic energy operator, the dark state also evolves into the bright state with frequency proportional to the atom's external momentum. Gradients in the polarization of the molasses beam create a sinusoidal potential energy landscape for the bright state in which atoms lose kinetic energy by traveling "uphill" to potential energy maxima that coincide with circular polarizations capable of executing electric dipole transitions to the excited state. Atoms in the excited state are then optically pumped to the dark state and subsequently evolve back to the bright state to restart the cycle. Alternately, the pair of bright and dark ground states can be generated by electromagnetically-induced transparency (EIT).

The net effect of many cycles from bright to excited to dark states is to subject atoms to Sisyphus-like cooling in the bright state and select the coldest atoms to enter the dark state and escape the cycle. The latter process constitutes velocity-selective coherent population trapping (VSCPT). The combination of bright and dark states thus inspires the name "gray molasses."

=== History ===
In 1988, The NIST group in Washington led by William Phillips first measured temperatures below the Doppler limit in sodium atoms in an optical molasses, prompting the search for the theoretical underpinnings of sub-Doppler cooling. The next year, Jean Dalibard and Claude Cohen-Tannoudji identified the cause as the multi-photon process of Sisyphus cooling, and Steven Chu's group likewise modeled sub-Doppler cooling as fundamentally an optical pumping scheme. As a result of their efforts, Phillips, Cohen-Tannoudji, and Chu jointly won the 1997 Nobel Prize in Physics. T.W. Hänsch, et al., first outlined the theoretical formulation of gray molasses in 1994, and a four-beam experimental realization in cesium was achieved by G. Grynberg the next year. It has since been regularly used to cool all the other alkali (hydrogenic) metals.

=== Comparison to Sisyphus Cooling ===
In Sisyphus cooling, the two Zeeman levels of a $J=1/2$ atomic ground state manifold experience equal and opposite AC Stark shifts from the near-resonant counter-propagating beams. The beams also effect a polarization gradient, alternating between linear and circular polarizations. The potential energy maxima of one $m_J$ coincide with pure circular polarization, which optically pumps atoms to the other $m_J$, which experiences its minima in the same location. Over time, the atoms expend their kinetic energy traversing the potential energy landscape and transferring the potential energy difference between the crests and troughs of the AC-Stark-shifted ground state levels to emitted photons.

In contrast, gray molasses only has one sinusoidally light-shifted ground state; optical pumping at the peaks of this potential energy landscape takes atoms to the dark state, which can selectively evolve to the bright state and re-enter the cycle with sufficient momentum. Sisyphus cooling is difficult to implement when the excited state manifold is poorly-resolved (i.e. whose hyperfine spacing is comparable to or less than the constituent linewidths); in these atomic species, the Raman-type gray molasses is preferable.

== Theory ==
=== Dressed-State Picture ===
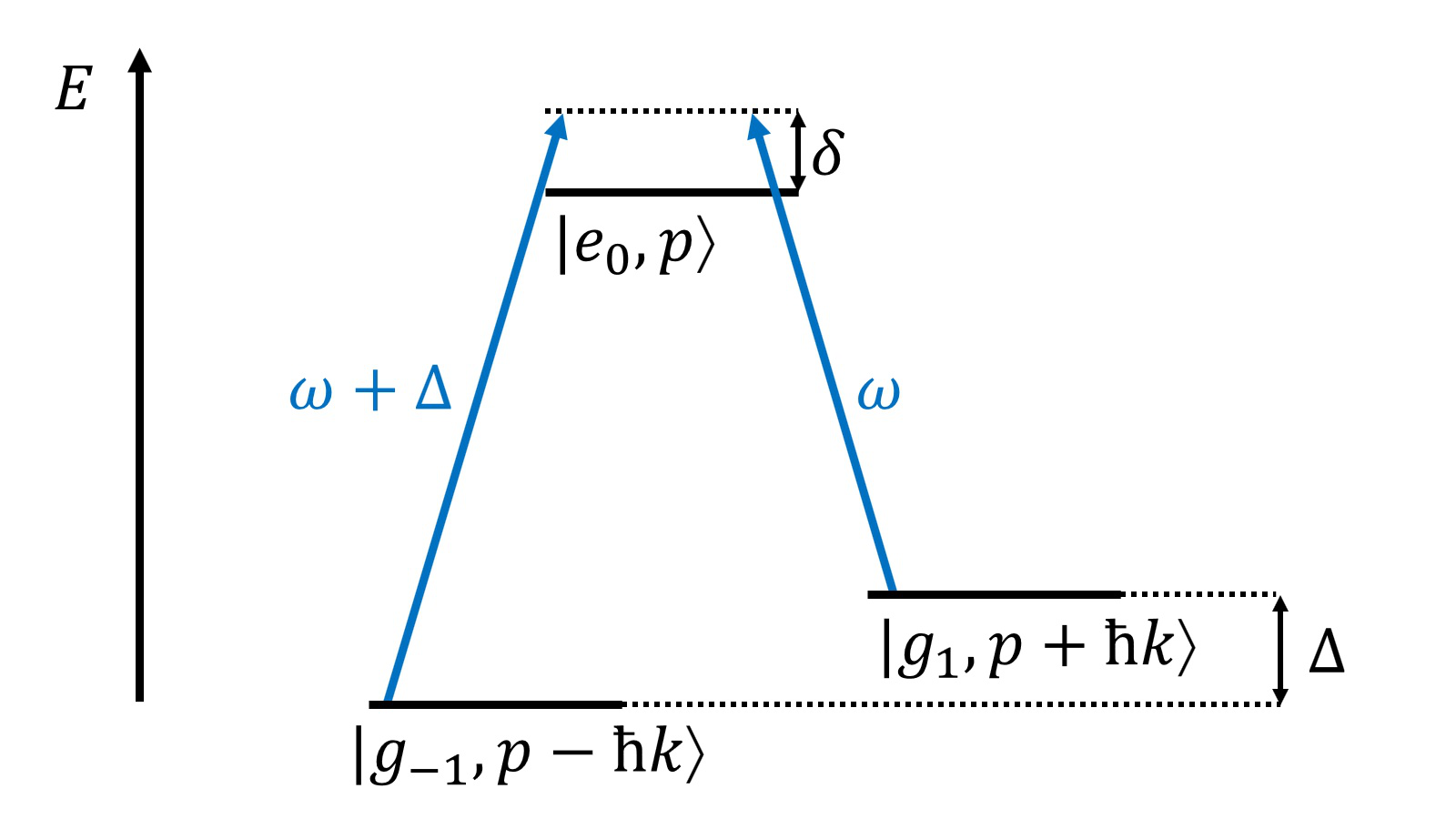
The energy level diagram of the three-level model, illustrating the two-photon Raman process detuned ($\delta$) from the excited state. Each state is an eigenstate of the bare Hamiltonian, being a product of the internal electronic state ($|g_{-1}\rangle,|g_1\rangle,$ and $|e_0\rangle$) and the overall momentum of the atom ($|p\rangle$).

Denote the two ground states and the excited state of the electron $|g_{-1}\rangle,|g_1\rangle,$ and $|e_0\rangle$, respectively. The atom also has overall momentum, so the overall state of the atom is a product state of its internal state and its momentum, as shown in the figure. In the presence of counter-propagating beams of opposite polarization, the internal states experience the atom-light interaction Hamiltonian

$$H_\mathrm{AL}=\frac{\hbar\Omega}{2\sqrt{2}}\left(|e_0\rangle\langle g_1|e^{ikx}-|e_0\rangle\langle g_{-1}|e^{-ikx}\right)e^{-i\omega t}+\mathrm{h.c.}$$

where $\Omega$ is the Rabi frequency, approximated to be the same for both transitions. Using the definition of the translation operator in momentum space,

$$e^{\pm ikx}=\int|p\rangle\langle p\mp\hbar k|\mathrm{d}p,$$

the effect of $H_\mathrm{AL}$ on the state $|e_0,p\rangle$ is

$$H_\mathrm{AL}|e_0,p\rangle=\frac{\hbar\Omega}{2\sqrt{2}}\left(|g_1,p+\hbar k\rangle-|g_{-1},p-\hbar k\rangle\right)e^{i\omega t}$$

This suggests the dressed state $|\psi_\mathrm{c}(p)\rangle$ that couples to $|\psi_\mathrm{e}(p)\rangle=|e_0,p\rangle$ is a more convenient basis state of the two ground states. The orthogonal basis state $|\psi_\mathrm{nc}(p)\rangle$ defined below does not couple to $|\psi_\mathrm{e}(p)\rangle$ at all.

$$\begin{align}
|\psi_\mathrm{c}(p)\rangle&\equiv\frac{1}{\sqrt{2}}\left(|g_1,p+\hbar k\rangle-|g_{-1},p-\hbar k\rangle\right)\\
|\psi_\mathrm{nc}(p)\rangle&\equiv\frac{1}{\sqrt{2}}\left(|g_1,p+\hbar k\rangle+|g_{-1},p-\hbar k\rangle\right)\\
|\psi_\mathrm{e}(p)\rangle&\equiv|e_0,p\rangle
\end{align}$$

The action of $H_\mathrm{AL}$ on these states is

$$\begin{align}
H_\mathrm{AL}|\psi_\mathrm{c}(p)\rangle&=\frac{\hbar\Omega}{2}e^{-i\omega t}|\psi_\mathrm{e}(p)\rangle\\
H_\mathrm{AL}|\psi_\mathrm{nc}(p)\rangle&=0\\
H_\mathrm{AL}|\psi_\mathrm{e}(p)\rangle&=\frac{\hbar\Omega}{2}e^{i\omega t}|\psi_\mathrm{c}(p)\rangle
\end{align}$$

Thus, $|\psi_\mathrm{c}(p)\rangle$ and $|\psi_\mathrm{e}(p)\rangle$ undergo Sisyphus-like cooling, identifying the former as the bright state. $|\psi_\mathrm{nc}(p)\rangle$ is optically inaccessible and constitutes the dark state. However, $|\psi_\mathrm{c}(p)\rangle$ and $|\psi_\mathrm{nc}(p)\rangle$ are not eigenstates of the momentum operator, and thus motionally couple to one another via the kinetic energy term of the unperturbed Hamiltonian:

$$\left\langle\psi_\mathrm{c}(p)\left|\frac{p^2}{2M}\right|\psi_\mathrm{nc}(p)\right\rangle=\frac{\hbar kp}{M}$$

As a result of this coupling, the dark state evolves into the bright state with frequency proportional to the momentum, effectively selecting hotter atoms to re-enter the Sisyphus cooling cycle. This nonadiabatic coupling occurs predominantly at the potential minima of the light-shifted coupling state. Over time, atoms cool until they lack the momentum to traverse the sinusoidal light shift of the bright state and instead populate the dark state.

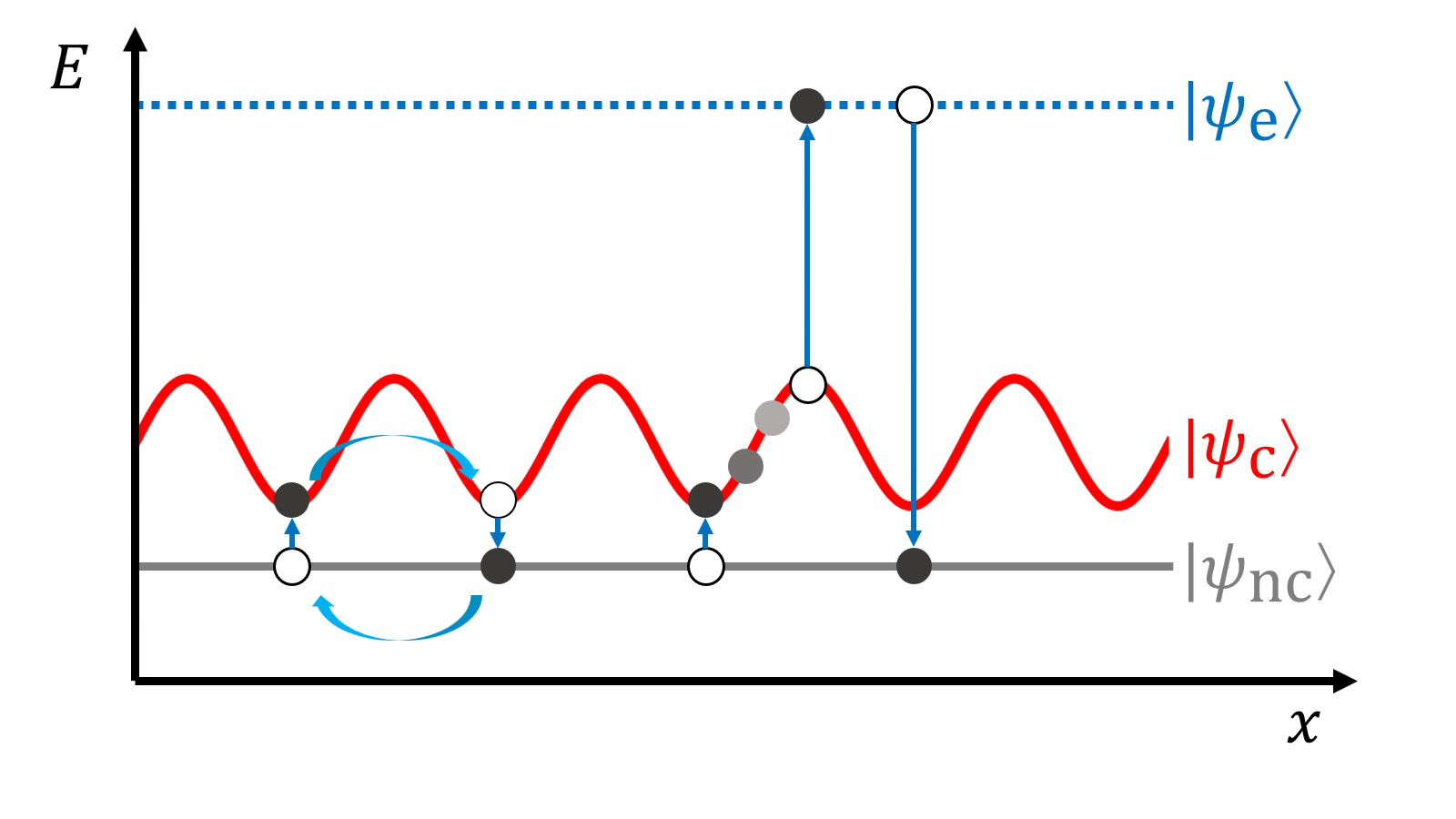
The energy-level diagram of the dressed three-level system with position dependent AC Stark shift on $|\psi_\mathrm{c}(p)\rangle$ (that of $|\psi_\mathrm{e}(p)\rangle$ is not shown, nor the $\delta$-detuned virtual excited state, for clarity). The right process illustrates the gray molasses Sisyphus-like cooling cycle from the "bright" coupling state to the excited state to the "dark" non-coupling state, described in detail in the main text. The left process depicts the nonadiabatic coupling between the bright and dark states that results from the action of the bare Hamiltonian. Figure adapted from Hänsch's seminal paper.

=== Raman Condition ===
The resonance condition of any $\Lambda$-type Raman process requires that the difference in the two photon energies match the difference in energy between the states at the "legs" of the $\Lambda$, here the ground states $|g_{-1}\rangle,|g_1\rangle,$ identified above. In experimental settings, this condition is realized when the detunings of the cycling and repumper frequencies in respect to the $|g_{-1}\rangle\rightarrow|e_0\rangle$ and $|g_1\rangle\rightarrow|e_0\rangle$ transition frequencies, respectively, are equal. (Note: The so-called cycling light addresses the transition representing the dominant spontaneous decay path, while the repumper light addresses those atoms that decay to the other hyperfine ground state. This terminology originates from the use of similar hyperfine manifolds in Doppler cooling, such as in Zeeman slowers and magneto-optical traps, where the repumper light optically pumps atoms out of the otherwise inaccessible hyperfine ground state. Atomic physics experiments that use both Doppler and sub-Doppler cooling stages will often also refer to the gray molasses lasers as "cycling" and "repumper" simply because they have the same relative detuning as those of the earlier stage, but their function in gray molasses is qualitatively different, and thus do not exactly map onto the names.)

Unlike most Doppler cooling techniques, light in the gray molasses must be blue-detuned from its resonant transition; the resulting Doppler heating is offset by polarization-gradient cooling. Qualitatively, this is because the choice of $|F=2\rangle\rightarrow|F'=2\rangle$ means that the AC Stark shifts of the three levels are the same sign at any given position. Selecting the potential energy maxima as the sites of optical pumping to the dark state requires the overall light to be blue-detuned; in doing so, the atoms in the bright state traverse the maximum potential energy difference and thus dissipate the most kinetic energy. A full quantitative explanation of the molasses force with respect to detuning can be found in Hänsch's paper.

== See also ==
- Sisyphus cooling
- Raman cooling
