= Sub-Doppler cooling =

Laser cooling technique

In atomic, molecular, and optical physics, sub-Doppler cooling is a class of laser cooling techniques that reduce the temperature of atoms and molecules below the Doppler cooling limit. In experiment implementation, Doppler cooling is limited by the broad natural linewidth of the lasers used in cooling. Regardless of the transition used, however, Doppler cooling processes have an intrinsic cooling limit that is characterized by the momentum recoil from the emission of a photon from the particle. This is called the recoil temperature and is usually far below the linewidth-based limit mentioned above. By laser cooling methods beyond the two-level approximations of atoms, temperature below this limit can be achieved.

Optical pumping between the sublevels that make up an atomic state introduces a new mechanism for achieving ultra-low temperatures. The essential feature of sub-Doppler cooling is the non-adiabaticity of the moving atoms to the light field. For a spatially dependent light field, the orientation of moving atoms is adjusted by optical pumping to fit the conditions of the light field. Yet the moving atoms do not instantly adjust to the light field as they move, their orientation always lags behind the orientation that would exist for stationary atoms, which determines the velocity-dependent differential absorption and hence the cooling. With this cooling process, lower temperatures can be obtained.

Various methods have been used independently or combined in an experimental sequence to achieve sub-Doppler cooling. One method to produce spatially dependent optical pumping is polarization gradient cooling, where the superposition of two counter-propagating laser beams of orthogonal polarizations lead to a light field with polarization varying on the wavelength scale. A specific mechanism within polarization gradient cooling is Sisyphus cooling, where atoms climb "potential hills" created by the interaction of their internal energy states with spatially varying light fields. The light field in optical molasses in three-dimension also has polarization gradient.

Other methods of sub-Doppler cooling include evaporative cooling, free space Raman cooling, Raman side-band cooling, resolved sideband cooling, electromagnetically induced transparency (EIT) cooling, and the use of a dark magneto-optical trap. These techniques can be used depending on the minimum temperature needed and specifications of the individual setup. For example, an optical molasses time-of-flight technique was used to cool sodium (Doppler limit $T_D \approx 240 \ \mu K$) to $43 \pm 20 \ \mu K$.

Motivations for sub-doppler cooling include motional ground state cooling, cooling to the motional ground state, a requirement for maintaining fidelity during many quantum computation operations.

== Dark magneto-optical trap ==
A magneto-optical trap (MOT) is commonly used for cooling and trapping a substance by Doppler cooling. In the process of Doppler cooling, the red detuned light would be absorbed by atoms from one certain direction and re-emitted in a random direction. The electrons of the atoms would decay to an alternative ground states if the atoms have more than one hyperfine ground level. There is the case of all the atoms in the other ground states rather than the ground states of Doppler cooling, then system cannot cool the atoms further.

In order to solve this problem, the other re-pumping light would be incident on the system to repopulate the atoms to restart the Doppler cooling process. This would induce higher amounts of fluorescence being emitted from the atoms which can be absorbed by other atoms, acting as a repulsive force. Due to this problem, the Doppler limit would increase and is easy to meet. When there is a dark spot or lines on the shape of the re-pumping light, the atoms in the middle of the atomic gas would not be excited by the re-pumping light which can decrease the repulsion force from the previous cases.

This can help to cool the atoms to a lower temperature than the typical Doppler cooling limit. This is called a dark magneto-optical trap (DMOT).

== Limits ==
The Doppler cooling limit is set by balancing the heating from the momentum kicks. Applying the results from the Fokker–Planck equation to the sub-Doppler processes would lead to an arbitrarily low final temperature as the damping coefficient become arbitrarily large. A few more considerations are needed. For instance, When a photon is scattered, the momentum change of the atom is assumed to be small relative to its overall momentum, but when the atom slows down to around the region of $v_r=\frac{\hbar k}{M}$, the momentum change becomes significant. Thus at low velocities, spontaneous emission would leave the atom with a residual momentum around $\hbar k$, which sets a minimum velocity scale. The velocity distribution around $v_r$ cannot be well described by the Fokker Planck equation, and this sets an intuitive lower limit on the temperature.

Furthermore, polarization gradient cooling depends on the ability to localize atoms to a scale of $\sim \lambda/{2\pi}$, where $\lambda$ is the wavelength of the light. Due to the uncertainty principle, this localization also imposes a minimum momentum spread $\sim \hbar k$, which also leads to a limit on how much the atoms can be cooled.

These theories are tested in the analytical and numerical calculations in with a one-dimensional polarization gradient molasses. It was shown that in the limit of large detuning, the velocity distribution depends only on a dimensionless parameter, the light shift of the ground state divided by the recoil energy. The minimum kinetic energy was found to be on the order of 40 times the recoil energy.
