= Optical lattice =

Atomic-scale structure formed through the Stark shift by opposing beams of light

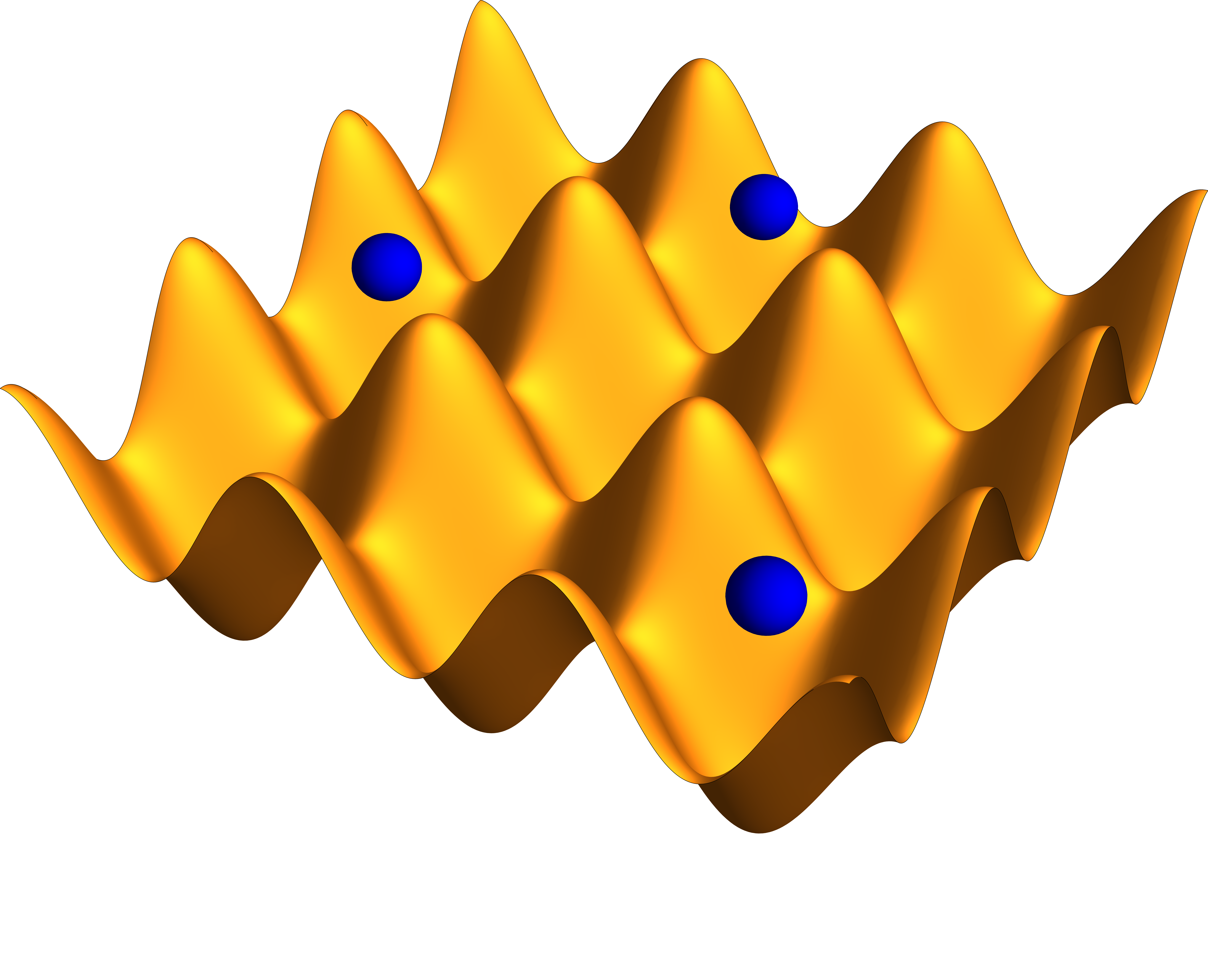
Atoms (represented as blue spheres) pictured in a 2D-optical lattice potential (represented as the yellow surface).

An optical lattice is formed by the interference of counter-propagating laser beams, creating a spatially periodic intensity pattern. The resulting periodic potential may trap neutral atoms via the Stark shift. Trapping atoms in standing waves of light was first proposed by V. S. Letokhov in 1968. Atoms are cooled and congregate at the intensity extrema (at maxima for red-detuned lattices, and minima for blue-detuned lattices). The resulting arrangement of trapped atoms resembles a crystal lattice and can be used for quantum simulation.

Atoms trapped in the optical lattice may move due to quantum tunneling, even if the potential well depth of the lattice points exceeds the kinetic energy of the atoms, which is similar to the electrons in a conductor. However, a superfluid–Mott insulator transition may occur, if the interaction energy between the atoms becomes larger than the hopping energy when the well depth is very large. In the Mott insulator phase, atoms will be trapped in the potential minima and cannot move freely, which is similar to the electrons in an insulator. In the case of fermionic atoms, if the well depth is further increased the atoms are predicted to form an antiferromagnetic, i.e. Néel state at sufficiently low temperatures.

== Parameters ==
There are two important parameters of an optical lattice: the potential well depth and the periodicity.

=== Control of potential depth ===
The potential experienced by the atoms is related to the intensity of the laser used to generate the optical lattice. The potential depth of the optical lattice can be tuned in real time by changing the power of the laser, which is often controlled by an acousto-optic modulator (AOM). The AOM is tuned to deflect a variable amount of the laser power into the optical lattice. Active power stabilization of the lattice laser can be accomplished by feedback of a photodiode signal to the AOM.

=== Control of periodicity ===
The periodicity of the optical lattice can be tuned by changing the wavelength of the laser or by changing the relative angle between the two laser beams. The real-time control of the periodicity of the lattice is still a challenging task. The wavelength of the laser cannot easily be varied over a large range in real time, and so the periodicity of the lattice is normally controlled by the relative angle between the laser beams. However, it is difficult to keep the lattice stable while changing the relative angles as the interference is sensitive to the relative phase between the laser beams. Titanium-sapphire lasers, with their large tunable range, provide a possible platform for direct tuning of wavelength in optical lattice systems.

Continuous control of the periodicity of a one-dimensional optical lattice while maintaining trapped atoms was first demonstrated in 2005 using a single-axis servo-controlled galvanometer. This "accordion lattice" was able to vary the lattice periodicity from 1.30 to 9.3 μm. Such accordion lattices are useful for controlling ultracold atoms in optical lattices, where small spacing is essential for quantum tunneling, and large spacing enables single-site manipulation and spatially resolved detection. Site-resolved detection of the occupancy of lattice sites of both bosons and fermions within a high tunneling regime is regularly performed in quantum gas microscopes. More recently, a different method of real-time control of the lattice periodicity was demonstrated, in which the center fringe moved less than 2.7 μm while the lattice periodicity was changed from 0.96 to 11.2 μm.

== Principle of operation ==
The trapping mechanism is via the Stark shift, where off-resonant light causes shifts to an atom's internal structure. The effect of a non-resonant light field on an atom is to induce an electric dipole moment as a result of the oscillating electric field. This induced dipole will then interact with the electric field, leading to an energy shift $\Delta E = \frac{1}{2} \alpha(\omega)\langle E^2(t)\rangle$, where $\alpha(\omega)$, with $\omega=\omega_{res}+\delta$, is the dynamic polarizability of the atomic transition resonant at $\omega_{res}$ and $\delta$ is the detuning of the light field from resonance. In the case of $\delta<0$ ("red-detuning"), the induced dipole will be in phase with the field and thus the resulting potential energy gradient will point in the direction of higher intensity. This is the same trapping mechanism as in optical dipole traps (ODTs), with the only major difference being that the intensity of an optical lattice has a much more dramatic spatial variation than a standard ODT.

A 1D optical lattice is formed by two counter-propagating laser beams of the same polarization. The beams will interfere, leading to a series of minima and maxima separated by $\lambda/2$, where $\lambda$ is the wavelength of the light used to create the optical lattice. The resulting potential experienced by the atoms will be $V(x)=V_0\text{cos}^2(2\pi x/\lambda)$.

By use of additional laser beams, two- or three-dimensional optical lattices may be constructed. A 2D optical lattice may be constructed by interfering two orthogonal optical standing waves, giving rise to an array of 1D potential tubes. Likewise, three orthogonal optical standing waves can give rise to a 3D array of sites which may be approximated as tightly confining harmonic oscillator potentials.

== Technical challenges ==
The trapping potential experienced by atoms in an optical dipole trap is weak, generally below 1 mK. Thus atoms must be cooled significantly before loading them into the optical lattice. Cooling techniques used to this end include magneto-optical traps, Doppler cooling, polarization gradient cooling, Raman cooling, resolved sideband cooling, and evaporative cooling.

If the periodic potential is to be added following condensation as opposed to performing evaporative cooling in the lattice potential it is necessary to consider the conditions for adiabatic loading of the lattice. The lattice depth must be slowly ramped such that the condensate remains in its ground state in order to load the condensate into the ground band of the lattice. The timescale of the turn on will in general be set by the energy separation between the ground band and the first excited band of the optical lattice.

Once cold atoms are loaded into the optical lattice, they will experience heating by various mechanisms such as spontaneous scattering of photons from the optical lattice lasers. These mechanisms generally limit the lifetime of optical lattice experiments.

== Uses ==
=== Quantum simulation ===
Atoms in an optical lattice provide an ideal quantum system where all parameters are highly controllable and where simplified models of condensed-matter physics may be experimentally realized. Because atoms can be imaged directly – something difficult to do with electrons in solids – they can be used to study effects that are difficult to observe in real crystals. Quantum gas microscopy techniques applied to trapped atom optical-lattice systems can even provide single-site imaging resolution of their evolution. Once cooled and trapped in an optical lattice, the atoms can be further manipulated or left to evolve. Common manipulations involve the "shaking" of the optical lattice by varying the relative phase between the counterpropagating beams or by modulating the frequency of one of the counterpropagating beams which induces oscillating forces on the trapped atoms, or amplitude modulation of the lattice in which the lattice depth is modulated. After evolving in response to the lattice potential and any induced dynamics, the atoms can be imaged via absorption imaging.

By interfering differing numbers of beams in various geometries, varying lattice geometries can be created. These range from the simplest case of two counterpropagating beams forming a one-dimensional lattice, to more complex geometries like hexagonal lattices. The variety of geometries that can be produced in optical lattice systems allow the physical realization of different Hamiltonians, such as the Bose–Hubbard model, the Kagome lattice and Sachdev–Ye–Kitaev model, and the Aubry–André model. By studying the evolution of atoms under the influence of these Hamiltonians, which may be mapped to Hamiltonians describing the dynamics of electrons in various lattice models, insight about the solutions to the Hamiltonian can be gained. This is particularly relevant to complicated Hamiltonians which are not easily solvable using theoretical or numerical techniques, such as those for strongly correlated systems.

=== Optical clocks ===
The best atomic clocks in the world use atoms trapped in optical lattices, to obtain narrow spectral lines that are unaffected by the Doppler effect and recoil.

=== Quantum information ===
They are also promising candidates for quantum information processing.

=== Atom interferometry ===
Shaken optical lattices – where the phase of the lattice is modulated, causing the lattice pattern to slide back and forth – can be used to control the momentum state of the atoms trapped in the lattice. This control is exercised to split the atoms into populations of different momenta, propagate them to accumulate phase differences between the populations, and recombine them to produce an interference pattern.

=== Other uses ===
Besides trapping cold atoms, optical lattices have been widely used in creating gratings and photonic crystals. They are also useful for sorting microscopic particles, and may be useful for assembling cell arrays.

== See also ==
- Neutral atom quantum computer
- Bose–Hubbard model
- Ultracold atom
- List of laser articles
- Electromagnetically induced grating
- Magic wavelength
