= Resolved sideband cooling =

Laser cooling technique

Resolved sideband cooling is a laser cooling technique allowing cooling of tightly bound atoms and ions beyond the Doppler cooling limit, potentially to their motional ground state. Aside from the curiosity of having a particle at zero point energy, such preparation of a particle in a definite state with high probability (initialization) is an essential part of state manipulation experiments in quantum optics and quantum computing.

== Historical notes ==
As of the writing of this article, the scheme behind what we refer to as resolved sideband cooling today is attributed to D. J. Wineland and H. Dehmelt, in their article "Proposed $10^{14}\delta\nu/\nu$ laser fluorescence spectroscopy on Tl^{+} mono-ion oscillator III (sideband cooling)". The clarification is important, as at the time of the latter article, the term also designated what we call today Doppler cooling, which was experimentally realized with atomic ion clouds in 1978 by W. Neuhauser and independently by D. J. Wineland. An experiment that demonstrates resolved sideband cooling unequivocally in its contemporary meaning is that of Diedrich et al. Similarly unequivocal realization with non-Rydberg neutral atoms was demonstrated in 1998 by S. E. Hamann et al. via Raman cooling.

== Conceptual description ==
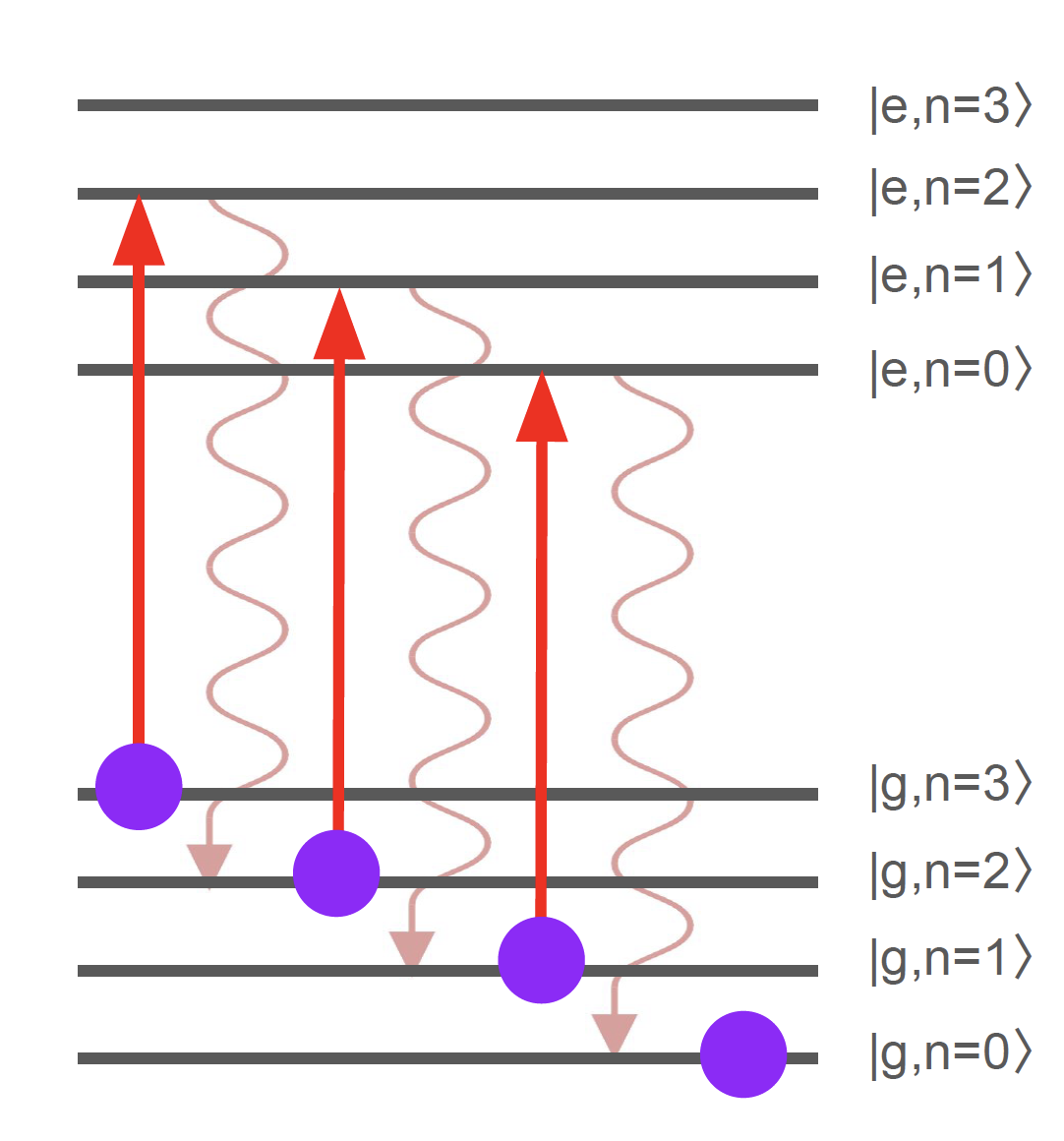
An atom undergoing resolved sideband cooling. Driven transitions are shown with straight arrows and spontaneous transitions with wiggly arrows. After each driven transition, the atom reaches an excited state with one less motional quanta than the state it came from. For example, the atom starts in the ground n = 3 state and is driven to the excited n = 2 state. The motional quantum number n does not change in spontaneous transitions.

Resolved sideband cooling is a laser-cooling technique that can be used to cool strongly trapped atoms to the quantum ground state of their motion. The atoms are usually precooled using the Doppler laser cooling. Subsequently, the resolved sideband cooling is used to cool the atoms beyond the Doppler cooling limit.

A cold trapped atom can be treated to a good approximation as a quantum-mechanical harmonic oscillator. If the spontaneous decay rate is much smaller than the vibrational frequency of the atom in the trap, the energy levels of the system will be an evenly spaced frequency ladder, with adjacent levels spaced by an energy $h \nu$, where $\nu$ is the frequency. Each level is denoted by a motional quantum number n, which describes the amount of motional energy present at that level. These motional quanta can be understood in the same way as for the quantum harmonic oscillator. A ladder of levels will be available for each internal state of the atom. For example, in the figure at right both the ground (g) and excited (e) states have their own ladder of vibrational levels.

Suppose a two-level atom whose ground state is denoted by g and excited state by e. Efficient laser cooling occurs when the frequency of the laser beam is tuned to the red sideband i.e.
$$\omega = \omega_0 - \nu,$$
where $\omega_0$ is the internal atomic transition frequency corresponding to at transition between g and e, and $\nu$ is the harmonic-oscillation frequency of the atom. In this case the atom undergoes the transition
$$|g, n\rangle \to |e, n - 1\rangle,$$
where $|a, m\rangle$ represents the state of an ion whose internal atomic state is a, and the motional state is m.

If the recoil energy of the atom is negligible compared with the vibrational quantum energy, subsequent spontaneous emission occurs predominantly at the carrier frequency. This means that the vibrational quantum number remains constant. This transition is
$$|e, n - 1\rangle \to |g, n - 1\rangle.$$

The overall effect of one of these cycles is to reduce the vibrational quantum number of the atom by one. To cool to the ground state, this cycle is repeated many times until $|g, n = 0\rangle$ is reached with a high probability.

== Theoretical basis ==
The core process that provides the cooling assumes a two level system that is well localized compared to the wavelength ($2\pi c/\omega_0$) of the transition (Lamb–Dicke regime), such as a trapped and sufficiently cooled ion or atom. Modeling the system as a harmonic oscillator interacting with a classical monochromatic electromagnetic field yields (in the rotating wave approximation) the Hamiltonian
$$H = H_\text{HO} + H_\text{AL}$$
with
$$H_\text{HO} = \hbar\nu\left(n + \frac 1 2\right),$$
$$H_\text{AL} = -\hbar\Delta |e\rangle \langle e| + \hbar \frac \Omega 2 \big(|e\rangle \langle g| e^{i\mathbf k\cdot\mathbf r} + |g\rangle \langle e|e^{-i\mathbf k\cdot\mathbf r}\big),$$
and where

$n$ is the number operator,
$\nu$ is the frequency spacing of the oscillator,
$\Omega$ is the Rabi frequency due to the atom-light interaction,
$\Delta$ is the laser detuning from $\omega_0$,
$\mathbf k$ is the laser wave vector.

That is, incidentally, the Jaynes–Cummings Hamiltonian used to describe the phenomenon of an atom coupled to a cavity in cavity QED. The absorption(emission) of photons by the atom is then governed by the off-diagonal elements, with probability of a transition between vibrational states $m, n$ proportional to $\big|\langle m| e^{i\mathbf k\cdot\mathbf r} |n\rangle \big|^2$, and for each $n$ there is a manifold $\big\{|g, n\rangle, |e, n\rangle\big\}$ coupled to its neighbors with strength proportional to $\big|\langle m| e^{i\mathbf k\cdot\mathbf r} |n\rangle\big|$. Three such manifolds are shown in the picture.

If the $\omega_0$ transition linewidth $\Gamma$ satisfies $\Gamma \ll \nu$, a sufficiently narrow laser can be tuned to a red sideband, $\omega_0 - q\nu, q \in \{1, 2, 3, \dots\}$. For an atom starting at $|g, n\rangle$, the predominantly probable transition will be to $|e, n - q\rangle$. This process is depicted by arrow "1" in the picture. In the Lamb–Dicke regime, the spontaneously emitted photon (depicted by arrow "2") will be, on average, at frequency $\omega_0$, and the net effect of such a cycle, on average, will be the removing of $q$ motional quanta. After some cycles, the average phonon number is $\bar n = R_q^{1/q}/(1 - R_q^{1/q})$, where $R_q$ is the ratio of the intensities of the red to blue $q$-th sidebands. In practice, this process is normally done on the first motional sideband $q = 1$ for optimal efficiency. Repeating the processes many times while ensuring that spontaneous emission occurs provides cooling to $\bar n \approx (\Gamma/\nu)^2 \ll 1$. More rigorous mathematical treatment is given in Turchette et al. and Wineland et al. Specific treatment of cooling multiple ions can be found in Morigi et al.

== Experimental implementations ==
For resolved sideband cooling to be effective, the process needs to start at sufficiently low $\bar n$. To that end, the particle is usually first cooled to the Doppler limit, then some sideband cooling cycles are applied, and finally, a measurement is taken or state manipulation is carried out. A more or less direct application of this scheme was demonstrated by Diedrich et al. with the caveat that the narrow quadrupole transition used for cooling connects the ground state to a long-lived state, and the latter had to be pumped out to achieve optimal cooling efficiency. It is not uncommon, however, that additional steps are needed in the process, due to the atomic structure of the cooled species. Examples of that are the cooling of Ca^{+} ions and the Raman sideband cooling of Cs atoms.

=== Example: cooling of Ca^{+} ions ===
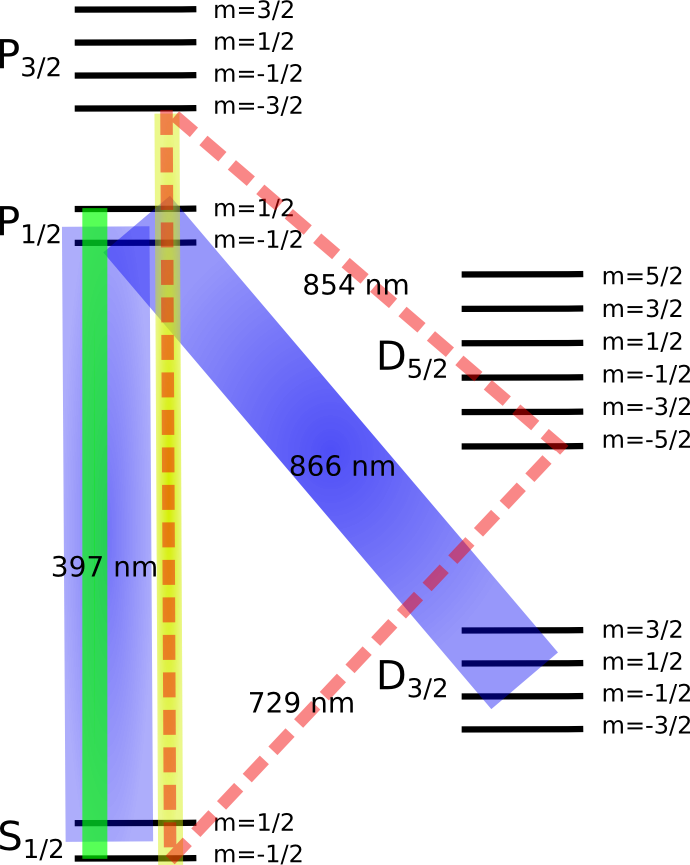
Relevant Ca^{+} structure and light: blue - Doppler cooling; red - sideband cooling path; yellow - spontaneous decay; green - spin polarization $\sigma^-$ pulses

The energy levels relevant to the cooling scheme for Ca^{+} ions are the S_{1/2}, P_{1/2}, P_{3/2}, D_{3/2}, and D_{5/2}, which are additionally split by a static magnetic field to their Zeeman manifolds. Doppler cooling is applied on the dipole S_{1/2} - P_{1/2} transition (397 nm), however, there is about 6% probability of spontaneous decay to the long-lived D_{3/2} state, so that state is simultaneously pumped out (at 866 nm) to improve Doppler cooling. Sideband cooling is performed on the narrow quadrupole transition S_{1/2} - D_{5/2} (729 nm), however, the long-lived D_{5/2} state needs to be pumped out to the short lived P_{3/2} state (at 854 nm) to recycle the ion to the ground S_{1/2} state and maintain cooling performance. One possible implementation was carried out by Leibfried et al. and a similar one is detailed by Roos. For each data point in the 729 nm absorption spectrum, a few hundred iterations of the following are executed:

- the ion is Doppler cooled with 397 nm and 866 nm light, with 854 nm light on as well
- the ion is spin polarized to the S_{1/2}(m=-1/2) state by applying a $\sigma^-$ 397 nm light for the last few moments of the Doppler cooling process
- sideband cooling loops are applied at the first red sideband of the D_{5/2}(m=-5/2) 729 nm transition
- to ensure the population ends up in the S_{1/2}(m=-1/2) state, another $\sigma^-$ 397 nm pulse is applied
- manipulation is carried out and analysis is carried out by applying 729 nm light at the frequency of interest
- detection is carried out with 397 nm and 866 nm light: discrimination between dark (D) and bright (S) state is based on a pre-determined threshold value of fluorescence counts

Variations of this scheme relaxing the requirements or improving the results are being investigated/used by several ion-trapping groups.

=== Example: Raman sideband cooling of Cs atoms ===
A Raman transition replaces the one-photon transition used in the sideband above by a two-photon process via a virtual level. In the Cs cooling experiment carried out by Hamann et al., trapping is provided by an isotropic optical lattice in a magnetic field, which also provides Raman coupling to the red sideband of the Zeeman manifolds. The process followed in is:

- preparation of cold sample of $10^6$ Cs atoms is carried out in optical molasses, in a magneto-optic trap
- atoms are allowed to occupy a 2D, near resonance lattice
- the lattice is changed adiabatically to a far off resonance lattice, which leaves the sample sufficiently well cooled for sideband cooling to be effective (Lamb-Dicke regime)
- a magnetic field is turned on to tune the Raman coupling to the red motional sideband
- relaxation between the hyperfine states is provided by a pump/repump laser pair
- after some time, pumping is intensified to transfer the population to a specific hyperfine state
- lattice is turned off and time of flight techniques are employed to perform Stern-Gerlach analysis

== See also ==
- Laser cooling
- Amplitude modulation
