= Polarization gradient cooling =

Laser cooling technique

Polarization gradient cooling (PG cooling), or Sisyphus cooling, is a technique in laser cooling of atoms by dampening the motion of the trapped particles via photon momentum. It was proposed to explain the experimental observation of cooling below the Doppler limit observed in cesium atom-related laser cooling experiments in 1985. Shortly after the theory was introduced, experiments were performed that verified the theoretical predictions. While Doppler cooling allows atoms to be cooled to hundreds of microkelvin, PG cooling allows atoms to be cooled to a few microkelvin or less.

True to its name, PG cooling involves the use of a polarization gradient typically generated by the superposition of two counter propagating beams of light with orthogonal polarizations. This creates a gradient where the polarization varies in space, with the gradient depending on which type of polarization is used. Orthogonal linear polarizations (the lin⊥lin configuration) results in the polarization varying between linear and circular polarization in the range of half a wavelength. However, if orthogonal circular polarizations (the σ^{+}σ^{−} configuration) are used, the result is a linear polarization that rotates along the axis of propagation. Both configurations can be used for cooling and yield similar results, however, the physical mechanisms involved are very different. For the lin⊥lin case, the polarization gradient causes periodic light shifts in Zeeman sublevels of the atomic ground state that allows for a Sisyphus effect to occur. In the σ^{+}-σ^{−} configuration, the rotating polarization creates a motion-induced population imbalance in the Zeeman sublevels of the atomic ground state, resulting in an imbalance in the radiation pressure that opposes the motion of the atom. Both configurations achieve sub-Doppler cooling and instead reach the recoil limit. While the limit of PG cooling is lower than that of Doppler cooling, the capture range of PG cooling is lower and thus an atomic gas must be pre-cooled before PG cooling.

== Observation of Cooling Below the Doppler Limit ==
When laser cooling of atoms was first proposed in 1975, the only cooling mechanism considered was Doppler cooling. As such the limit on the temperature was predicted to be the Doppler limit:

$k_BT= \frac {\hbar\Gamma}{2}$

Here k_{b} is the Boltzmann constant, T is the temperature of the atoms, and Γ is the inverse of the excited state's radiative lifetime. Early experiments seemed to be in agreement with this limit, and it was understood to be the main method of laser cooling atoms. However, in 1988 experiments began to report temperatures below the Doppler limit. These observations would take the theory of PG cooling to explain.

== Theory ==
There are two different configurations that form polarization gradients: lin⊥lin and σ^{+}σ^{−}. Both configurations provide cooling, but the type of polarization gradient and the physical mechanism for cooling are different between the two.

=== The lin⊥lin Configuration (Gradient of Ellipticity) ===
In the lin⊥lin configuration cooling is achieved via a Sisyphus effect. Consider two counterpropagating electromagnetic plane waves with equal amplitude and orthogonal linear polarizations $\vec{E_1} = E_0e^{ikz}\hat{x}$ and $\vec{E_2} = E_0e^{-ikz}\hat{y}$, where k is the wavenumber $k = \textstyle\frac{2\pi}{\lambda}$. The superposition of $\vec{E_1}$ and $\vec{E_2}$ is given as:

$\vec{E}_{tot} = \frac{E_0}{\sqrt2}\left(\cos(kz)\frac{\hat{x}+\hat{y}}{\sqrt2} - i\sin(kz)\frac{-\hat{x}+\hat{y}}{\sqrt2}\right)$

Introducing a new pair of coordinates $\hat{x}'=\textstyle\frac{\hat{x}+\hat{y}}{\sqrt2}$ and $\hat{y}'=\textstyle\frac{-\hat{x}+\hat{y}}{\sqrt2}$ the field can be written as:

$\vec{E}_{tot} = \frac{E_0}{\sqrt2}\left(\cos(kz)\hat{x}' - i\sin(kz)\hat{y}'\right)$

The polarization of the total field changes with z. For example: we see that at $z=0$ the field is linearly polarized along $\hat{x}'$, at $z=\textstyle\frac{\lambda}{8}$ the field has left circular polarization, at $z=\textstyle\frac{\lambda}{4}$ the field is linearly polarized along $\hat{y}'$, at $z=\textstyle\frac{3\lambda}{8}$ the field has right circular polarization, and at $z=\textstyle\frac{\lambda}{2}$ the field is again linearly polarized along $\hat{x}'$.

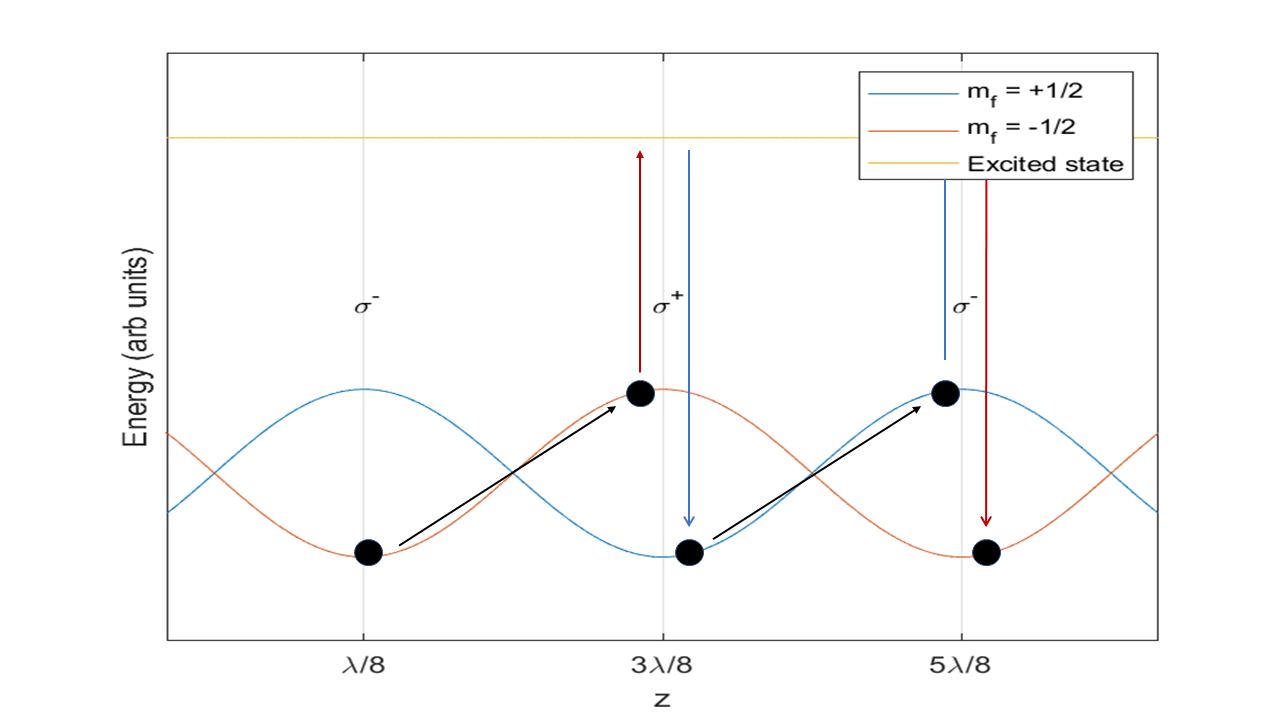
The Sisyphus effect. The ground state light shifts cause the Zeeman sublevels to oscillate with a period of $\textstyle\frac{\lambda}{2}$. An atom moves uphill to the right, converting its kinetic energy into potential energy. Near the top of the hill, the atom is excited into an F=3/2 state and decays back into the lowest energy state at the bottom of the hill resulting in an irreversible loss of kinetic energy. As the atom moves through the polarization gradient, this process happens many times.

Consider an atom interacting with the field detuned below the transition from atomic states $F_g = \textstyle\frac{1}{2}$ and $F_e = \textstyle\frac{3}{2}$ ($\hbar{}\omega{}_{field} < E_{eg}$). The variation of the polarization along z results in a variation in the light shifts of the atomic Zeeman sublevels with z. The Clebsch-Gordan coefficient connecting the $|g,m_F=-\textstyle\frac{1}{2}\rangle$ state to the $|e,m_F=-\textstyle\frac{3}{2}\rangle$ state is 3 times larger than connecting the $|g,m_F=\textstyle\frac{1}{2}\rangle$ state to the $|e,m_F=-\textstyle\frac{1}{2}\rangle$ state. Thus for $\sigma^-$ polarization the light shift is three times larger for the $|g,m_F=-\textstyle\frac{1}{2}\rangle$ state than for the $|e,m_F=\textstyle\frac{1}{2}\rangle$ state. The situation is reversed for $\sigma^+$ polarization, with the light shift being three times larger for the $|g,m_F=\textstyle\frac{1}{2}\rangle$ state than the $|e,m_F=-\textstyle\frac{1}{2}\rangle$ state. When the polarization is linear, there is no difference in the light shifts between the two states. Thus the energies of the states will oscillate in z with period $\textstyle\frac{\lambda}{2}$.

As an atom moves along z, it will be optically pumped to the state with the largest negative light shift. However, the optical pumping process takes some finite time $\tau$. For field wavenumber k and atomic velocity v such that $kv \approx \tau{}^{-1}$, the atom will travel mostly uphill as it moves along z before being pumped back down to the lowest state. In this velocity range, the atom travels more uphill than downhill and gradually loses kinetic energy, lowering its temperature. This is called the Sisyphus effect after the mythological Greek character. Note that this initial condition for velocity requires the atom to be cooled already, for example through Doppler cooling.

=== The σ^{+}σ^{−} Configuration (Pure Rotation of Polarization) ===
Representing the total electric field as $\vec{E}(z,t) = E^+(z)e^{-i\omega_Lt} + c.c.$, we can make the argument that the positive-frequency component is expressed as $\vec{E}^+(z) = \vec{\epsilon}E_0e^{ikz} + \vec{\epsilon}'E_0'e^{-ikz}$, where $\vec{\epsilon}$ and $\vec{\epsilon}$' are polarization vectors along some axes. In this case, we consider the Cartesian coordinate system for familiarity. Then, we consider the case where we have two opposing circular polarizations, or:

$\vec{\epsilon} = -\frac{1}{\sqrt{2}}(\epsilon_x + i\epsilon_y)$

$\vec{\epsilon}' = \frac{1}{\sqrt{2}}(\epsilon_x - i\epsilon_y)$

Where ${\epsilon}_x$ and ${\epsilon}_y$ are the amplitudes of the polarization vectors across the x- and y-axis, respectively. Substituted into our positive-frequency electric field expression, we note:

$\vec{E}^+(z) = \epsilon_1\frac{1}{\sqrt{2}}(E_0'-E_0) - \epsilon_2\frac{1}{\sqrt{2}}(E_0'+E_0)$

Where we utilize Euler's identity to simplify the polarization vectors $\vec{\epsilon}$ and $\vec{\epsilon}$' into the following forms:

$\epsilon_1 = \epsilon_x\cos{(kz)} - \epsilon_y\sin(kz)$

$\epsilon_2 = \epsilon_x\sin{(kz)} + \epsilon_y\cos(kz)$

This results in a total electric field that is elliptically polarized. It falls from elliptical polarization that when one vector moves along the propagation axis, the axes of the ellipse rotate accordingly an angle -kz. This preserves the elliptical polarization of the total electric field regardless of the position along the propagation axis.

As a result, there is no Sisyphus effect. The rotating polarization instead leads to motion-induced population imbalances in the Zeeman levels that cause imbalances in radiation pressure leading to a damping of the atomic motion. These population imbalances are only present for states with $F=1$ or higher.

Consider two EM waves detuned from an atomic transition $F_g=1 \rightarrow F_e=2$ with equal amplitudes. Now, consider an atom moving along the z-axis with some velocity v. The atom sees the polarization rotating with a frequency of $kv$. In the rotating frame, the polarization is fixed, however, there is an inertial field due to the frame rotating. This inertial term appears in the Hamiltonian as follows.

$\hat{H}_{rot} = kvF_z$

Here we see the inertial term looks like a magnetic field along $\hat{z}$ with an amplitude such that the Larmor precession frequency is equal to rotation frequency in the lab frame. For small v, this term in Hamiltonian can be treated using perturbation theory.

Choosing the polarization in the rotating frame to be fixed along $\hat{y}$, the unperturbed atomic eigenstates are the eigenstates of $\hat{F}_y$. The rotating term in the Hamiltonian causes perturbations in the atomic eigenstates such that the Zeeman sublevels become contaminated by each other. For $F_g=1$ the $|g,m_f=0\rangle_y$ is light shifted more than the $|g,m_f=\pm{1}\rangle_y$ states. Thus, the steady state population of the $|g,m_f=0\rangle_y$ is higher than that of the other states. The populations are equal for the $|g,m_f=\pm{1}\rangle_y$ states. Thus, states are balanced with $\langle\hat{F}_y\rangle = 0$. However, when we change basis, we see that populations are not balanced in the z-basis and there is a non-zero value of $\langle\hat{F}_z\rangle$ proportional to the atom's velocity:

$\langle\hat{F}_z\rangle = \frac{40\hbar{}kv}{17\Delta_0^'}$

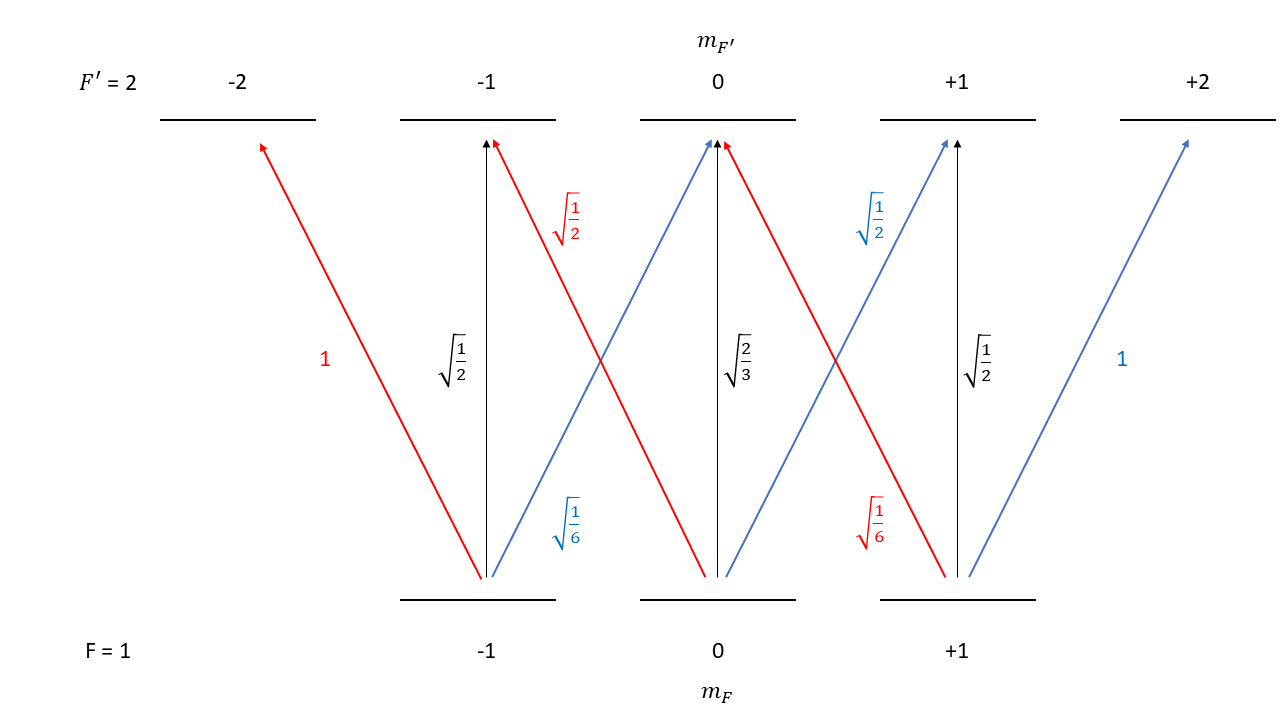
Clebsch Gordan coefficients for the $F_g = 1$ to $F_e = 2$ transition

Where $\Delta_0^'$ is the light shift for the $m_F=0$ state. There is a motion induced population imbalance in the Zeeman sublevels in the z basis. For red detuned light, $\Delta_0^'$ is negative, and thus there will be a higher population in the $|g,m_f=-1\rangle$ state when the atom is moving to the right (positive velocity) and a higher population in the $|g,m_f=1\rangle$ state when the atom is moving to the left (negative velocity). From the Clebsch-Gordan coefficients, we see that the $|g,m_f=-1\rangle$ state has a six times greater probability of absorbing a $\sigma^-$ photon moving to the left than a $\sigma^+$ photon moving to the right. The opposite is true for the $|g,m_f=1\rangle$ state. When the atom moves to the right it is more likely to absorb a photon moving to the left and likewise when the atom moves to the left it is more likely to absorb a photon moving to the right. Thus, there is an unbalanced radiation pressure when the atom moves which dampens the motion of the atom, lowering its velocity and therefore its temperature by virtue of the kinetic theory.

Note the similarity to Doppler cooling in the unbalanced radiation pressures due to the atomic motion. The unbalanced pressure in PG cooling is not due to a Doppler shift but an induced population imbalance. Doppler cooling depends on the parameter $\textstyle\frac{kv}{\Gamma}$ where $\Gamma$ is the scattering rate, whereas PG cooling depends on $\textstyle\frac{kv}{\Delta_0^'}$. At low intensity, $\Delta_0^' \ll \Gamma$, indicating PG cooling works at lower atomic velocities and temperatures than Doppler Cooling.

=== Limits and Scaling ===
Both methods of PG cooling surpass the Doppler limit and instead are limited by the one-photon recoil limit:

$kT_\mathrm{recoil} = \frac{\hbar{}^2k^2}{2M}$

Where M is the atomic mass.

For a given detuning $\delta$ and Rabi frequency $\Omega$, dependent on the light intensity, both configurations display a similar scaling at low intensity ($\Omega \ll |\delta|$) and large detuning ($\delta \gg \Gamma$):

$kT = \alpha{}\frac{\hbar{}\Omega^2}{|\delta|}$

Where $\alpha$ is a dimensionless constant dependent on the configuration and atomic species. See ref for a full derivation of these results.

Therefore, in order to reduce the temperature, it is advised to have the Rabi frequency $\Omega$ be substantially larger than the detuning $\delta$ (i.e. the detuning should be minimized).

== Experiment ==
PG cooling is typically performed using a 3D optical setup with three pairs of perpendicular laser beams with an atomic ensemble in the center. Each beam is prepared with an orthogonal polarization to its counterpropagating beam. The laser frequency detuned from a selected transition between the ground and excited states of the atom. Since the cooling processes rely on multiple transitions between ground and excited states, care must be taken such that the atomic state does not fall out of these two states. This is done by using a second, "repumping", laser to pump any atoms that fall out back into the ground state of the transition. For example: in cesium cooling experiments, the cooling laser is typically chosen to be detuned from the $|6^2S_{1/2} F=4 \rangle$ to $|6^2P_{3/2} F^'=5 \rangle$ transition and a repumping laser tuned to the $|6^2S_{1/2} F=3 \rangle$ to $|6^2P_{3/2} F^'=4\rangle$ transition is also used to prevent the Cs atoms from being pumped into the $|6^2S_{1/2} F=3 \rangle$ state.

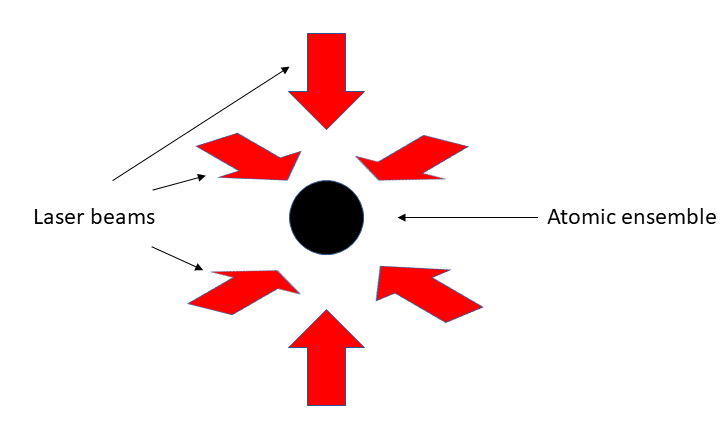
A typical set-up for PG cooling. An atomic ensemble is irradiated by three pairs of counterpropagating laser beams with orthogonal polarizations. The repumping laser can be added to any or all of the pairs of beams.

The atoms must be cooled before the PG cooling, this can be done using the same setup via Doppler cooling. If the atoms are precooled with Doppler cooling, the laser intensity must be lowered and the detuning increased for PG cooling to be achieved.

The atomic temperature can be measured using the time of flight (ToF) technique. In this technique, the laser beams are suddenly turned off and the atomic ensemble is allowed to expand. After a set time delay t, a probe beam is turned on to image the ensemble and obtain the spatial extent of the ensemble at time t. By imaging the ensemble at several time delays, the rate of expansion is found. By measuring the rate of expansion of the ensemble the velocity distribution is measured and from this, the temperature is inferred.

An important theoretical result is that in the regime where PG cooling functions, the temperature only depends on the ratio of $\Omega^2$ to $|\gamma|$ and that the cooling approaches the recoil limit. These predictions were confirmed experimentally in 1990 when W.D. Phillips et al. observed such scaling in their cesium atoms as well as a temperature of 2.5$\mu$K, 12 times the recoil temperature of 0.198$\mu$K for the D2 line of cesium used in the experiment.

== Modern Research ==
Recently, PG cooling has been important in research topics such as Bose-Einstein condensates, optical dipole traps, and integrated photonics. As an important aspect of atom trapping, there is substantial interest in achieving PG cooling for 3D magneto-optical traps. However, such traps typically require large volumes due to necessitating the use of multiple collimated lasers within an atomic vacuum cell. Thus, there is an active research scene in PICMOTs, or photonic integrated circuit magneto-optical traps. One proposed avenue through which such small form factors can be achieved is via metasurfaces for devices orders of magnitude smaller. If this were to be successful, PG cooling could be achieved at a much smaller form factor than currently possible, and deployed in the use of PICMOTs for higher levels of system integration, reduced optical losses, and compact magnetic field generation.

With regards to optical dipole traps, it was recently shown that PG cooling operating under the σ^{+}σ^{−} configuration is able to probe an optical trap's trapping field (i.e. the dependency of the cooling limit of its polarization). Currently, the efficiency of such an idea is vastly unexplored by literature and thus provides a promising field of interest for further research.
