= Laser detuning =

Difference between a laser's optical frequency and quantum resonant frequency

In optical physics, laser detuning is the tuning of a laser to a frequency that is slightly off from a quantum system's resonant frequency. When used as a noun, the laser detuning is the difference between the resonance frequency of the system and the laser's optical frequency (or wavelength). Lasers tuned to a frequency below the resonant frequency are called red-detuned, and lasers tuned above resonance are called blue-detuned. This technique is essential in many AMO physics experiments and associated technologies, as it allows the manipulation of light–matter interactions with high precision. Detuning has use cases in research fields including quantum optics, laser cooling, and spectroscopy. It is also fundamental to many modern and emerging atomic and quantum technologies, such as atomic clocks, quantum computers, and quantum sensors. By adjusting the detuning, researchers and engineers can control absorption, emission, and scattering processes, making it a versatile tool in both fundamental and applied physics.

== Illustration ==
Consider a system with a resonance frequency $\omega_0$ in the optical frequency range of the electromagnetic spectrum, i.e. with frequency of a few THz to a few PHz, or equivalently with a wavelength in the range of 10 nm to 100 μm. The most common examples of such resonant systems in the optical frequency range are optical cavities (free-space, fiber or microcavities), atoms, and dielectrics or semiconductors. The laser detuning is important for a resonant system such as a cavity because it determines the phase (modulo 2$\pi$) acquired by the laser each roundtrip. This is important for linear optical processes such as interference and scattering, and extremely important for nonlinear optical processes because it affects the phase-matching condition.

If this system is excited by a laser with a frequency $\omega_L$ close to the resonance frequency $\omega_0$, the laser detuning is then defined as:

$\Delta \overset{\underset{\mathrm{def}}{}}{=} \ \omega_L - \omega_0$

This difference $(\Delta)$ determines how the laser interacts with the system. If $\Delta>0$, the laser is blue-detuned and if $\Delta<0$, the laser is red-detuned.

The probability of a stimulated emission or absorption event depends on the strength of the detuning and is represented by a Lorentzian profile:

$P(\omega) \propto \frac{\Gamma^2}{(\omega - \omega_0)^2 + \Gamma^2}$

where $\Gamma$ is the natural linewidth of the atomic transition.

In a moving reference frame, such as where the atoms in question are moving relative to the propagation of the laser, the Doppler effect modifies the detuning:

$\Delta = \omega - (\omega_0 + \vec{k} \cdot \vec{v})$

where $\vec{k}$ is the laser's wave vector and $\vec{v}$ is the velocity of the atom. Engineering the laser detuning in this way to a specific red shifted value is the basis for Doppler cooling.

For high-intensity lasers, power broadening occurs, altering the effective linewidth. The Rabi frequency $(\Omega)$ quantifies the strength of the atom-laser coupling and is related to detuning by the generalized Rabi formula:

$\Omega_{\text{eff}} = \sqrt{\Omega^2 + \Delta^2}$

== History of laser detuning ==
The concept of laser detuning emerged in tandem with formative experiments in laser physics. One of the earliest examples of high-impact work demonstrating the practical uses of laser detuning was Arthur Ashkin's research in the 1970s, resulting in the first optical trapping demonstrations for which he was awarded the 2018 Nobel Prize in Physics. Another fundamental advancement in laser physics utilizing detuning was Steven Chu's development of Doppler cooling in the 1980s, demonstrating the role of red-detuned lasers in reducing atomic velocities, for which he was awarded the 1997 Nobel Prize in Physics. Subsequent advancements, such as sub-Doppler cooling and magneto-optical traps, further showcased the power of detuning in cooling and controlling atomic systems.

== Applications ==
=== Laser cooling of atoms ===
By red-detuning a laser just below an atomic resonance, moving atoms absorb photons preferentially from the direction opposing their motion due to the Doppler effect. This causes a net cooling force. In Doppler cooling, lasers are red-detuned a few MHz below resonance. Rubidium, caesium, and other alkali atoms are common examples, with cooling light tuned near their $D_2$ transitions. When extended to three-dimensions, the Doppler cooling technique is often referred to as optical molasses. In such an arrangement, three orthogonal pairs of red-detuned lasers create a viscous "molasses" that slows the motion of the trapped atoms in all three spatial dimensions. Magneto-optical traps (MOTs) utilize an optical molasses scheme as well as a spatially varying magnetic field to trap and cool clouds of neutral atoms. The magnetic field induces a spatially varying Zeeman shift, that when coupled with proper molasses beam red-detuning, preferentially pushes the atoms towards the center of the trap. The detuning of the laser in a MOT ensures that the momentum kick on the atoms is only imparted upon the atoms moving away from the center of the trap, effectively trapping, slowing, and thus cooling the atoms down to temperatures as low as several microkelvin. Sub-Doppler cooling techniques, such as polarization gradient cooling and Sisyphus cooling, utilize more complex detuning schemes to achieve temperatures below the Doppler limit.

=== Spectroscopy ===
In high-resolution spectroscopy, detuning enhances the ability to distinguish closely spaced energy levels. One specific use case is two-photon spectroscopy, which is when a laser is detuned away from intermediate states to allow access to higher-energy states without populating the lower levels, reducing background noise. Another example is isotope-selective spectroscopy, which is when laser detuning is adjusted to enable selective excitation of isotopes with slightly shifted transition frequencies. This is useful in nuclear physics and geochemistry.

=== Optomechanics ===
Similar to the laser cooling of atoms, the sign of the detuning plays an important part in optomechanical applications. In the red detuned regime, the optomechanical system undergoes cooling and coherent energy transfer between the light and the mechanical mode (a "beam splitter"). In the blue-detuned regime, it undergoes heating, mechanical amplification and possibly squeezing and entanglement. The on-resonance case when the laser detuning is zero, can be used for very sensitive detection of mechanical motion, such as used in LIGO.

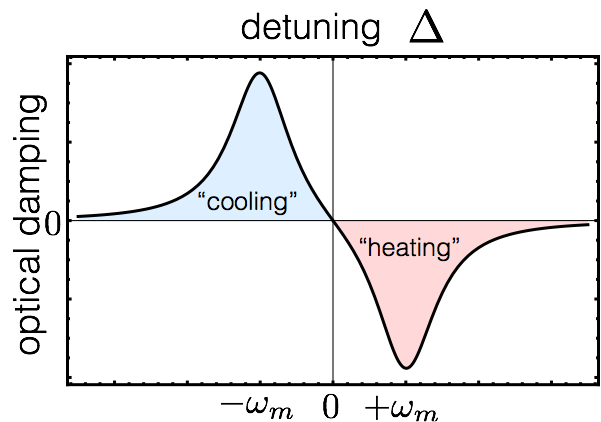
A plot of the optically induced damping of a mechanical oscillator in an optomechanical system.

=== Pound-Drever-Hall technique ===
Laser detuning often plays a key role in laser frequency stabilization, notably in the Pound-Drever-Hall (PDH) locking technique. In a typical PDH system, the incident laser is phase modulated to generate sidebands above and below the carrier frequency. The modulated light is directed into an optical resonator, and the light reflected from the resonator is detected by a fast photodetector. The photodetector signal is first demodulated with a reference at the phase-modulation frequency, then low-pass filtered. Near the cavity resonance, the carrier and both sidebands experience different complex reflection coefficients, producing an asymmetrical error signal whose sign can be used to determine whether the carrier frequency is above or below resonance. A feedback controller uses this signal to then adjust the laser frequency or the cavity length, maintaining resonance.

=== Technological applications ===
Atomic clocks utilize laser detuning to probe specific and spectrally narrow hyperfine transitions in rubidium, caesium, strontium, and other elements. Optical tweezers utilize red and blue laser detuning to trap particles for analysis from the sub-nanometer to micron scale, enabling advancements in many fields including biology and medicine. Laser frequency combs utilize laser detuning to stabilize the comb teeth relative to a stable frequency standard.

=== Dynamic detuning ===
Laser detuning does not have to be static and can be dynamically varied in advanced techniques to achieve specific effects. One method is chirped detuning, where the laser frequency is gradually varied. This is used in stimulated Raman adiabatic passage to enable smooth transitions between quantum states, which can be used for qubit control. Another use of dynamic laser detuning is a Zeeman slower, where detuning is adjusted depending on the atomic velocities according to

$\delta'=\delta+kv-\frac{\mu'B}{\hbar}$

where $v$ is the atomic velocity, which can change over time, causing a dynamic change in laser detuning.
