= Morigi =

Morigi may refer to:

- Morigi language, a language of Papua New Guinea
- Morigi, an Italian surname; notable people include:
  - Giovanna Morigi (born 1969), Italian physicist
  - Guillermo Morigi (born 1974), Argentine football player
  - Renzo Morigi (1895–1962), Italian sports shooter
  - Roger Morigi (1907–1995), Italian-born American sculptor
