= Raman cooling =

Laser cooling technique

In atomic physics, Raman cooling is a sub-recoil cooling technique that allows the cooling of atoms using optical methods below the limitations of Doppler cooling, Doppler cooling being limited by the recoil energy of a photon given to an atom. This scheme can be performed in simple optical molasses or in molasses where an optical lattice has been superimposed, which are called respectively free space Raman cooling and Raman sideband cooling. Both techniques make use of Raman scattering of laser light by the atoms.

== Two photon Raman process ==
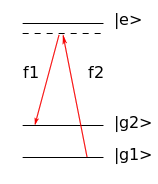
An example of the Raman two photon process, in this case between two states through a virtual state slightly red-detuned from a real excited state

The transition between two hyperfine states of the atom can be triggered by two laser beams: the first beam excites the atom to a virtual excited state (for example because its frequency is lower than the real transition frequency), and the second beam de-excites the atom to the other hyperfine level. The frequency difference of the two beams is exactly equal to the transition frequency between the two hyperfine levels. Raman transitions are good for cooling due to the extremely narrow line width of Raman transitions between levels that have long lifetimes, and to exploit the narrow line width the difference in frequency between the two laser beams must be controlled very precisely.

The illustration of this process is shown in the example schematic illustration of a two-photon Raman process. It enables the transition between the two levels $|g_1\rangle$ and $|g_2\rangle$. The intermediate, virtual level is represented by the dashed line, and is red-detuned with respect to the real excited level, $|e\rangle$. The frequency difference $f_2-f_1$ here matches exactly the energy difference between $|g_1\rangle$ and $|g_2\rangle$.

== Free space Raman cooling ==
In this scheme, a pre-cooled cloud of atoms (whose temperature is of a few tens of microkelvins) undergoes a series of pulses of Raman-like processes. The beams are counter-propagating, and their frequencies are just as what has been described above, except that the frequency $f_2$ is now slightly red-detuned (detuning $\Delta$) with respect to its normal value. Thus, atoms moving towards the source of the laser 2 with a sufficient velocity will be resonant with the Raman pulses, thanks to the Doppler effect. They will be excited to the $|g_2\rangle$ state, and get a momentum kick decreasing the modulus of their velocity.

If the propagation directions of the two lasers are interchanged, then the atoms moving in the opposite direction will be excited and get the momentum kick that will decrease the modulus of their velocities. By regularly exchanging the lasers propagating directions and varying the detuning $\Delta$, one can manage to have all atoms for which the initial velocity satisfies $|v|>v_{max}$ in the state $|g_2\rangle$, while the atoms such that $|v|<v_{max}$ are still in the $|g_1\rangle$ state. A new beam is then switched on, whose frequency is exactly the transition frequency between $|g_2\rangle$ and $|e\rangle$. This will optically pump the atoms from the $|g_2\rangle$ state to the $|g_1\rangle$ state, and the velocities will be randomized by this process, such that a fraction of the atoms in $|g_2\rangle$ will acquire a velocity $|v|<v_{max}$.

By repeating this process several times (eight in the original paper, see references), the temperature of the cloud can be lowered to less than a microkelvin.

== Raman sideband cooling ==
Raman sideband cooling is a method to prepare atoms in the vibrational ground state of a periodic potential and cool them below recoil limit. It can be implemented inside an optical dipole trap where cooling with less loss of trapped atoms could be achieved in comparison to evaporative cooling, can be implemented as a mid-stage cooling to improve the efficiency and speed of evaporative cooling, and is generally extremely insensitive to the traditional limitations of laser cooling to low temperatures at high densities. It has been successfully applied to cooling ions, as well as atoms like caesium, potassium, and lithium, etc.

=== General Raman sideband cooling scheme ===
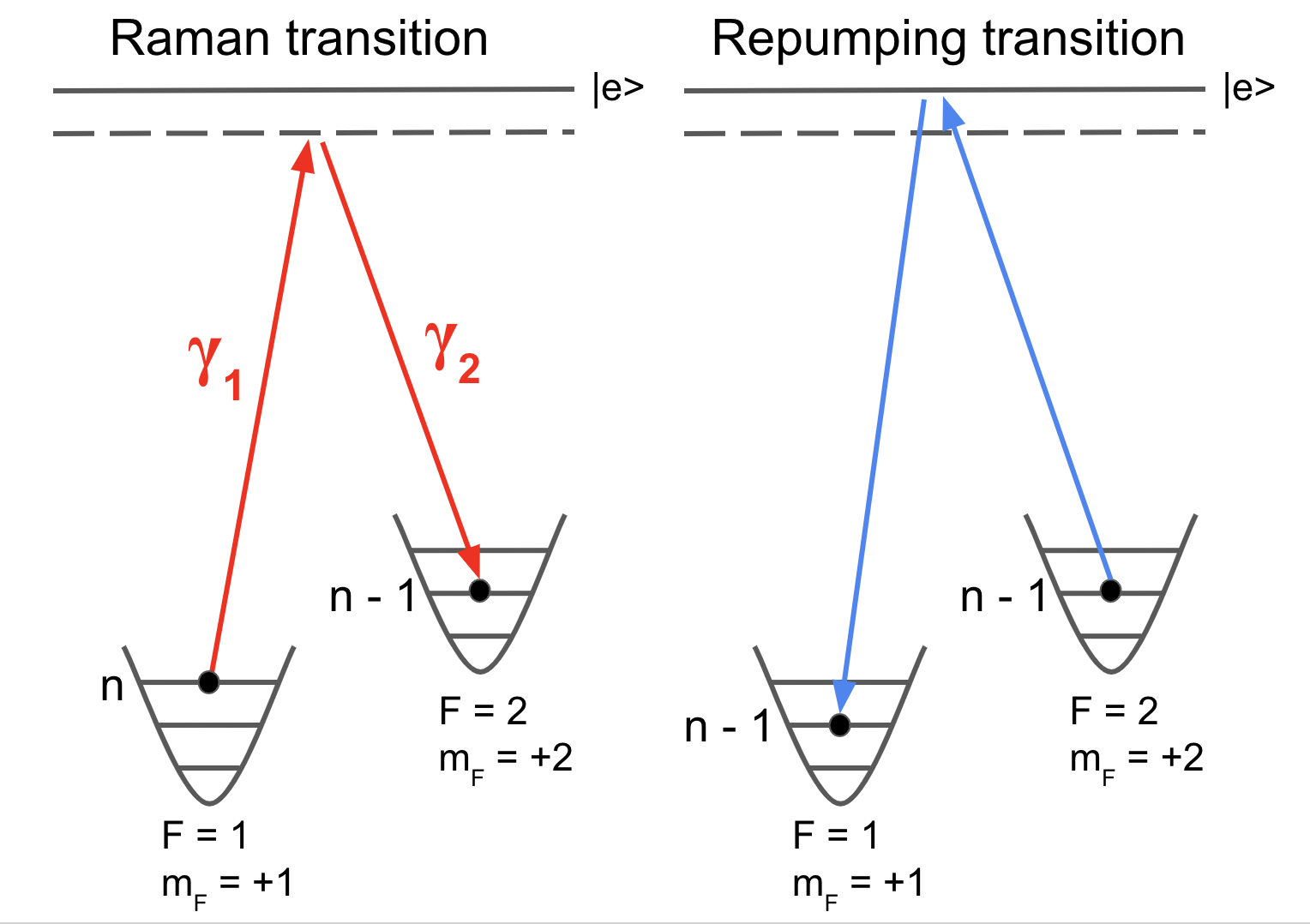
General Raman sideband cooling scheme, where two different photons generate a Raman transition between vibrational levels in two harmonic oscillator potentials, and then repumping brings back the transition to the original state, but the lower vibrational level is maintained.

The main method of Raman sideband cooling utilizes the two photon Raman process to connect $m,n$ levels that differ by one harmonic oscillator energy. Since the atoms are not in their ground state, they will be trapped in one of the excited levels of the harmonic oscillator. The aim of Raman sideband cooling is to put the atoms into the ground state of the harmonic potential. For a general example of a scheme, Raman beams (red in the included diagram) are two different photons ($\gamma_1$ and $\gamma_2$) that are linearly polarized differently such that we have a change in angular momentum, shifting from $m_F = +1$ to $m_F = +2$, but lowering from $n$ to $n-1$ vibrational levels. Then, we utilize repumping with a single beam (blue in the included diagram) that does not change vibrational levels (i.e. keeping us in $n-1$, thus lowering the state of the harmonic potential in the site.

=== Degenerate Raman sideband cooling in an optical lattice ===
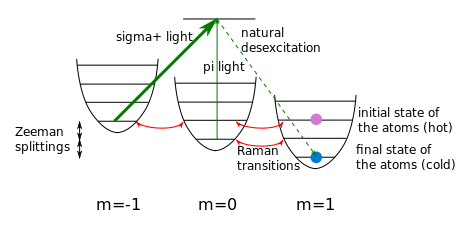
Degenerate Raman sideband cooling

This more specific cooling scheme starts from atoms in a magneto-optical trap, using Raman transitions inside an optical lattice to bring the atoms to their vibrational ground states. An optical lattice is a spatially periodic potential formed by the interference of counter-propagating beams. An optical lattice is ramped up, such that an important fraction of the atoms are then trapped. If the lasers of the lattice are powerful enough, each site can be modeled as a harmonic trap. The optical lattice should provide a tight binding for the atoms, to prevent them from interacting with the scattered resonant photons and suppress the heating from them. This can be quantified in terms of Lamb-Dicke parameter $\eta$, which gives the ratio of the ground state wave-packet size to the wavelength of the interacting laser light. In an optical lattice, $\eta$ can be interpreted as the ratio of photon recoil energy to the energy separation in the vibrational modes:

$\eta=\sqrt{\frac{E_r}{E_v}} < 1$

where $E_r$ is recoil energy and $E_v$ is vibrational energy. $\eta < 1$ is the Lamb-Dicke limit. In this regime, vibrational energy is larger than the recoil energy, and scattered photons cannot change the vibrational state of the atom.

For specifically degenerate Raman sideband cooling, we can consider a two level atom, the ground state of which has a quantum number of $F = 1$, such that it is three-fold degenerate with $m = -1$, $0$ or $1$. A magnetic field is added, which lifts the degeneracy in $m$ due to the Zeeman effect. Its value is exactly tuned such that the Zeeman splitting between $m = -1$ and $m = 0$ and between $m = 0$ and $m = 1$ is equal to the spacing of two levels in the harmonic potential created by the lattice.

By means of Raman processes, an atom can be transferred to a state where the magnetic moment has decreased by one and the vibrational state has also decreased by one (red arrows on the above image). After that, the atoms which are in the lowest vibrational state of the lattice potential (but with $m\neq 1$) are optically pumped to the $m = 1$ state (role of the $\sigma_+$ and $\pi$ light beams). Since the temperature of the atoms is low enough with respect to the pumping beam frequencies, the atom is very likely not to change its vibrational state during the pumping process. Thus it ends up in a lower vibrational state, which is how it is cooled. In order to reach this efficient transfer to the lower vibrational state at each step, the parameters of the laser, i.e. power and timing, should be carefully tuned. In general, these parameters are different for different vibrational states because the strength of the coupling (Rabi frequency) depends on the vibrational level. Additional complication to this naive picture arises from the recoil of photons, which drive this transition. The last complication can be generally avoided by performing cooling in the previously mentioned Lamb-Dicke regime, where the atom is trapped so strongly in the optical lattice that it effectively does not change its momentum due to the photon recoils. The situation is similar to the Mössbauer effect.

This cooling scheme allows one to obtain a rather high density of atoms at a low temperature using only optical techniques. For instance, the Bose–Einstein condensation of caesium was achieved for the first time in an experiment that used Raman sideband cooling as its first step. Recent experiments have shown it is even sufficient to attain Bose–Einstein condensation directly.

== See also ==
- Laser cooling
- Sub-Doppler cooling
