= Detuning =

Detuning can refer to:

- Musical tuning, the act of tuning an instrument or voice
- Engine tuning, detuning one aspect, such as power, in favor of another aspect such as economy
- Laser detuning, the difference between a laser frequency and a resonant frequency
