= Mara Prentiss =

American physicist

Mara Goff Prentiss (born 1959) is an American physicist, the Lola England de Valpine Professor of Applied Mathematics, of Organismic and Evolutionary Biology, and of Physics at Harvard University. After early experiments with magneto-optical traps to cool and manipulate individual atoms, her research interests have shifted to the individual manipulation of biomolecules, the self-assembly of DNA structures, and the molecular mechanics of homologous recombination.

== Education and career ==
Prentiss is originally from Cleveland, Ohio, where she was born in 1959; her father worked as a carpenter. She was a triple major in physics, mathematics, and philosophy at Wellesley College, graduating in 1980. She completed a Ph.D. in 1986 from the Massachusetts Institute of Technology, under the supervision of Shaoul Ezekiel.

Next, the worked at Bell Labs from 1986 to 1991, directing the experimental development of the first magneto-optical trap. This work formed the basis of the Nobel Prize given to her coauthor Steven Chu in 1997. She joined the Harvard University faculty in 1991, initially working there on atom lithography. She was tenured in 1995, the second woman after Melissa Franklin to earn tenure in the Harvard Physics Department.

She became Mallinckrodt Professor of Physics and was named a Harvard College Professor in 2023, before taking her present title as Lola England de Valpine Professor of Applied Mathematics, of Organismic and Evolutionary Biology, and of Physics.

== Book ==
Prentiss is the author of Energy Revolution: The Physics and the Promise of Efficient Technology (Harvard University Press, 2015).

== Recognition ==
Prentiss is a Fellow of the American Physical Society, elected in 2003 after a nomination from the APS Division of Atomic, Molecular & Optical Physics, "for her pioneering work in manipulating matter with electromagnetic fields, including pioneering atom lithography and chip based atom optics".
