= Stimulated Raman adiabatic passage =

Quantum optical process

Time evolution of state populations for counter-intuitive STIRAP pulse sequence demonstrating coherent transfer.

In quantum optics, stimulated Raman adiabatic passage (STIRAP) is a process that permits transfer of a population between two applicable quantum states via at least two coherent electromagnetic (light) pulses. These light pulses drive the transitions of the three level Ʌ atom or multilevel system. The process is a form of state-to-state coherent control.

== Population transfer in three level Ʌ atom ==
Consider a simplified model of an atom with three energy levels in a Ʌ configuration: ground states $|g_1\rangle$ and $|g_2\rangle$ (for simplicity suppose that the energies of the ground states are the same) and excited state $|e\rangle$. Suppose in the beginning the total population is in the ground state $|g_1\rangle$. By applying pulses with specific shapes and durations, initially the unpopulated states $|g_2\rangle$ and $|e\rangle$ couple, and afterward superposition of states $|g_2\rangle$ and $|e\rangle$ couple to the state $|g_1\rangle$. Thereby a state is formed that permits the transformation of the population into state $|g_2\rangle$ without populating the excited state $|e\rangle$. This process of transforming the population without populating the excited state is called the stimulated Raman adiabatic passage.

== Three level theory ==
Consider states $|1\rangle$, $|2\rangle$ and $|3\rangle$ with the goal of transferring population initially in state $|1 \rangle$ to state $|3\rangle$ without populating state $|2\rangle$. Allow the system to interact with two coherent radiation fields, the pump and Stokes fields. Let the pump field couple only states $|1\rangle$ and $|2\rangle$ and the Stokes field couple only states $|2\rangle$ and $|3\rangle$, for instance due to far-detuning or selection rules. Denote the Rabi frequencies and detunings of the pump and Stokes couplings by $\Omega_{P/S}$ and $\Delta_{P/S}$. Setting the energy of state $|2\rangle$ to zero, the rotating wave Hamiltonian is given by

$H_{\mathrm{RWA}} = -\hbar \Delta_P |1\rangle \langle 1| + \hbar \Delta_S |3\rangle \langle 3 | + \frac{\hbar \Omega_P}{2} (|1\rangle \langle 2 | + \mathrm{h.c.}) + \frac{\hbar \Omega_S}{2} (|3\rangle \langle 2 | + \mathrm{h.c.})$

The energy ordering of the states is not critical, and here it is taken so that $E_1 < E_2 < E_3$ only for concreteness. Ʌ and V configurations can be realized by changing the signs of the detunings. Shifting the energy zero by $\Delta_P$ allows the Hamiltonian to be written in the more configuration independent form

$$H_{\mathrm{RWA}} = \hbar \begin{pmatrix} 0 & \frac{\Omega_P}{2} & 0 \\
\frac{\Omega_P}{2} & \Delta & \frac{\Omega_S}{2} \\
0 & \frac{\Omega_S}{2} & \delta \end{pmatrix}$$

Here $\Delta$ and $\delta$ denote the single and two-photon detunings respectively. STIRAP is achieved on two-photon resonance $\delta=0$. Focusing to this case, the energies upon diagonalization of $H_{\mathrm{RWA}}$are given by

$E_{0,\pm} = 0, \frac{\Delta \pm \sqrt{\Delta^2 + \Omega^2}}{2}$

where $\Omega^2 = \Omega_P^2 + \Omega_S^2$. Solving for the $E_0$ eigenstate $(c_1 \, c_2 \, c_3)^T$, it is seen to obey the condition

$c_2 = 0, \; \Omega_P c_1 + \Omega_S c_3 = 0$

The first condition reveals that the critical two-photon resonance condition yields a dark state which is a superposition of only the initial and target state. By defining the mixing angle $\tan \theta = \Omega_P/\Omega_S$ and utilizing the normalization condition $|c_1|^2 + |c_3|^2 = 1$, the second condition can be used to express this dark state as

$| \mathrm{dark}\rangle = \cos \theta \, |1 \rangle - \sin \theta \,|3 \rangle$

With the mixing angle $\theta$ is defined as $\tan\theta(t) = \frac{\Omega_P(t)}{\Omega_S(t)}$. From this, the STIRAP counter-intuitive pulse sequence can be deduced. At $\theta = 0$ which corresponds the presence of only the Stokes field ($\Omega_S \gg \Omega_P$), the dark state exactly corresponds to the initial state $|1\rangle$. As the mixing angle is rotated from $0$ to $\pi/2$, the dark state smoothly interpolates from purely state $|1\rangle$ to purely state $|3\rangle$. The latter $\theta=\pi/2$ case corresponds to the opposing limit of a strong pump field ($\Omega_P \gg \Omega_S$). Practically, this corresponds to applying Stokes and pump field pulses to the system with a slight delay between while still maintaining significant temporal overlap between pulses; the delay provides the correct limiting behavior and the overlap ensures adiabatic evolution. A population initially prepared in state $|1\rangle$ will adiabatically follow the dark state and end up in state $|3\rangle$ without populating state $|2\rangle$ as desired. The pulse envelopes can take on fairly arbitrary shape so long as the time rate of change of the mixing angle is slow compared to the energy splitting with respect to the non-dark states. This adiabatic condition takes its simplest form at the single-photon resonance condition $\Delta=0$ where it can be expressed as

$\Omega(t) \gg |\dot{\theta}(t)| = \frac{|\Omega_S(t) \dot{\Omega}_P(t) - \Omega_P(t) \dot{\Omega}_S(t)|}{\Omega(t)^2}$

Proof: We are given: $\tan\theta(t) = \frac{\Omega_P(t)}{\Omega_S(t)}$.

We want to find the derivative $\dot{\theta}(t)=\frac{d\theta(t)}{dt}$ in terms of, $\Omega_P(t)$ and $\Omega_S(t)$, and their derivatives.

=== Step 1: Differentiate both sides with respect to $t$ ===
Using the chain rule: $\frac{d(\tan\theta(t))}{dt}=\sec^2\theta(t)\cdot \frac{d\theta(t)}{dt}$

And: $\frac{d}{dt}\Bigg(\frac{\Omega_P(t)}{\Omega_S(t)}\Bigg)=\frac{\Omega_S(t) \dot{\Omega}_P(t) - \Omega_P(t) \dot{\Omega}_S(t)}{\Omega(t)^2}$

So equating both sides:

$\sec^2\theta(t)\cdot \frac{d\theta(t)}{dt}=\frac{\Omega_S(t) \dot{\Omega}_P(t) - \Omega_P(t) \dot{\Omega}_S(t)}{\Omega(t)^2}$

=== Step 2: Now let us express $\sec^2\theta(t)$ in terms of $\Omega_P(t)$ and $\Omega_S(t)$ ===
To do this one can start from $\tan\theta(t) = \frac{\Omega_P(t)}{\Omega_S(t)}$, then: $\sec^2\theta(t)= 1 +\tan^2\theta(t) =1+\Bigg(\frac{\Omega_P(t)}{\Omega_S(t)}\Bigg)^2$

=== Step 3: Solving for $\frac{d\theta(t)}{dt}$ yields ===
$\dot{\theta}(t) = \frac{\Omega_S(t) \dot{\Omega}_P(t) - \Omega_P(t) \dot{\Omega}_S(t)}{\Omega(t)^2}$

Recall that $\Omega(t)^2 = \Omega_P(t)^2+\Omega_S(t)^2$
