= Recoil temperature =

Energy imparted to an atom by photon emission

In condensed matter physics and atomic physics, the recoil temperature is a fundamental lower limit of temperature attainable by some laser cooling schemes. When an atom decays from an excited electronic state at rest to a lower energy electronic state by the spontaneous emission of a photon, due to conservation of momentum, the atom gains momentum equivalent to the momentum of the photon. This kinetic energy gain corresponds to the recoil temperature of the atom. The recoil temperature is

$$T_\text{recoil} = \frac{\hbar^2k^2}{mk_\text{B}} = \frac{p^2}{mk_\text{B}},$$

where

- k is the magnitude of the wavevector of the photon,
- m is the mass of the atom,
- k_{B} is the Boltzmann constant,
- $\hbar$ is the Planck constant,
- $p = \hbar k$ is the photon's momentum.

In general, the recoil temperature is below the Doppler cooling limit for atoms and molecules, so sub-Doppler cooling techniques such as Sisyphus cooling are necessary to reach it. For example, the recoil temperature for the D_{2} lines of alkali atoms is typically on the order of 1 μK, in contrast with a Doppler cooling limit on the order of 100 μK. However, the narrow-linewidth intercombination transitions of alkaline earth atoms such as strontium can have Doppler limits that are below their recoil limits, allowing laser cooling in narrow-line magneto-optical traps to the recoil limit without sub-Doppler cooling.

Cooling beyond the recoil limit is possible using specific schemes such as Raman cooling. Sub-recoil temperatures can also occur in the Lamb Dicke regime, where the recoil energy of a photon is smaller than a motional energy quantum; therefore the atom's state is effectively unchanged by recoil photons.
