= Evaporative cooling (atomic physics) =

Atomic physics technique to achieve high phase space densities

Evaporative cooling is an atomic physics technique to achieve high phase space densities which optical cooling techniques alone typically can not reach.

Atoms trapped in optical or magnetic traps can be evaporatively cooled via two primary mechanisms, usually specific to the type of trap in question: in magnetic traps, radiofrequency (RF) fields are used to selectively drive warm atoms from the trap by inducing transitions between trapping and non-trapping spin states; or, in optical traps, the depth of the trap itself is gradually decreased, allowing the most energetic atoms in the trap to escape over the edges of the optical barrier. In the case of a Maxwell-Boltzmann distribution for the velocities of the atoms in the trap, these atoms which escape/are driven out of the trap lie in the highest velocity tail of the distribution, meaning that their kinetic energy (and therefore temperature) is much higher than the average for the trap. The net result is that while the total trap population decreases, so does the mean energy of the remaining population. This decrease in the mean kinetic energy of the atom cloud translates into a progressive decrease in the trap temperature, cooling the trap.

The process is analogous to blowing on a cup of tea to cool it: those molecules at the highest end of the energy distribution for the tea form a vapor above the surface and are then removed from the system by blowing them away, decreasing the average energy, and therefore temperature, of the remaining tea molecules.

Evolution of a Maxwell-Boltzmann velocity distribution for an initial population of 1 million 87Rb atoms at ~300 K. On every step of the gif the fastest 5% of atoms in the distribution is removed, gradually reducing the mean velocity of the remaining atoms.

== Radiofrequency induced evaporation ==
Radiofrequency (RF) induced evaporative cooling is the most common method for evaporatively cooling atoms in a magneto-optical trap (MOT). Consider trapped atoms laser cooled on a |F=0⟩ → |F=1⟩ transition. The magnetic sublevels of the |F=1⟩ state (|m_{F}= -1,0,1⟩) are degenerate for zero external field. The confining magnetic quadrupole field, which is zero at the center of the trap and nonzero everywhere else, causes a Zeeman shift in atoms which stray from the trap center, lifting the degeneracy of the three magnetic sublevels. The interaction energy between the total spin angular momentum of the trapped atom and the external magnetic field depends on the projection of the spin angular momentum onto the z-axis, and is proportional to
$$\Delta E\propto-m_{F}B_{Z}$$
From this relation it can be seen that only the |m_{F}=-1⟩ magnetic sublevel will have a positive interaction energy with the field, that is to say, the energy of atoms in this state increases as they migrate from the trap center, making the trap center a point of minimum energy, the definition of a trap. Conversely, the energy of the |m_{F}=0⟩ state is unchanged by the field (no trapping), and the |m_{F}=1⟩ state actually decreases in energy as it strays from the trap center, making the center a point of maximum energy. For this reason |m_{F}=-1⟩ is referred to as the trapping state, and |m_{F}=0,1⟩ the non-trapping states. From the equation for the magnetic field interaction energy, it can also be seen that the energies of the |m_{F}=1,-1⟩ states shift in opposite directions, changing the total energy difference between these two states. The |m_{F}=-1⟩→|m_{F}=1⟩ transition frequency therefore experiences a Zeeman shift. With this in mind, the RF evaporative cooling scheme works as follows: the size of the Zeeman shift of the -1→+1 transition depends on the strength of the magnetic field, which increases radially outward from the trap center. Those atoms which are coldest move within a small region around the trap center, where they experience only a small Zeeman shift in the -1→+1 transition frequency. Warm atoms, however, spend time in regions of the trap much further from the center, where the magnetic field is stronger and the Zeeman shift therefore larger. The shift induced by magnetic fields on the scale used in typical MOTs is on the order of MHz, so that a radiofrequency source can be used to drive the -1→+1 transition. The choice of frequency for the RF source corresponds to a point on the trapping potential curve at which atoms experience a Zeeman shift equal to the frequency of the RF source, which then drives the atoms to the anti-trapping |m_{F}=1⟩ magnetic sublevel and immediately exits the trap. Lowering the RF frequency is therefore equivalent to lowering the dashed line in the figure, effectively reducing the depth of the potential well. For this reason the RF source used to remove these energetic atoms is often referred to as an "RF knife," as it effectively lowers the height of the trapping potential to remove the most energetic atoms from the trap, "cutting" away the high energy tail of the trap's energy distribution. This method was famously used to cool a cloud of rubidium atoms below the condensation critical temperature to form the first experimentally observed Bose-Einstein condensate (BEC) .

== Optical evaporation ==
While the first observation of Bose-Einstein condensation was made in a magnetic atom trap using RF driven evaporative cooling, optical dipole traps are now much more common platforms for achieving condensation. Beginning in a MOT, cold, trapped atoms are transferred to the focal point of a high power, tightly focused, off-resonant laser beam. The electric field of the laser at its focus is sufficiently strong to induce dipole moments in the atoms, which are then attracted to the electric field maximum at the laser focus, effectively creating a trapping potential to hold them at the beam focus.

The depth of the optical trapping potential in an optical dipole trap (ODT) is proportional to the intensity of the trapping laser light. Decreasing the power in the trapping laser beam therefore decreases the depth of the trapping potential. In the case of RF-driven evaporation, the actual height of the potential barrier confining the atoms is fixed during the evaporation sequence, but the RF knife effectively decreases the depth of this barrier, as previously discussed. For an optical trap, however, evaporation is facilitated by decreasing the laser power and thus lowering the depth of the trapping potential. As a result, the warmest atoms in the trap will have sufficient kinetic energy to be able to make it over the barrier walls and escape the trap, reducing the average energy of the remaining atoms as previously described. While trap depths for ODTs can be shallow (on the order of mK, in terms of temperature), the simplicity of this optical evaporation procedure has helped to make it increasingly popular for BEC experiments since its first demonstrations shortly after magnetic BEC production.

== See also ==
- Magneto-optical trap
- Bose-Einstein condensation
- Optical tweezers
- Laser cooling
- Sisyphus cooling
- Raman cooling
