= Giovanna Morigi =

Physicist

Giovanna Morigi (born 1969) is a physicist whose research involves theoretical quantum mechanics, including quantum optics, Wigner crystals, laser cooling, and ultracold atoms. Beyond fundamental physics, she has also published research on size control in biological tissue growth. Born in Italy and educated in Austria, she works in Germany as a professor of theoretical physics at Saarland University.

== Education and career ==
Morigi was born in 1969 in Ravenna, and was a student at the Liceo Scientifico "A. Oriani" in Ravenna. After earning a laurea at the University of Pisa in 1995, and spending a year as a researcher at the Clarendon Laboratory of the University of Oxford, she completed a PhD in 1999 at the University of Innsbruck.

She became a postdoctoral researcher at the Max Planck Institute of Quantum Optics from 2001 to 2002, continuing there as a research associate while taking a position as assistant professor at the University of Ulm from 2002 to 2004. She was a Ramón y Cajal Fellow at the Autonomous University of Barcelona from 2004 to 2009, when she took her present position as a full professor at Saarland University.

== Recognition ==
Morigi was named as a 2022 Fellow of the American Physical Society (APS), after a nomination from the APS Division of Atomic, Molecular and Optical Physics, "for the invention of novel techniques for cooling trapped ions, atoms, and molecules, and for pioneering theoretical work on the structural phase transitions in low-dimensional trapped-ion crystals".
