= Optical molasses =

Laser technique cooling atoms to temperatures lower than a magneto-optical trap

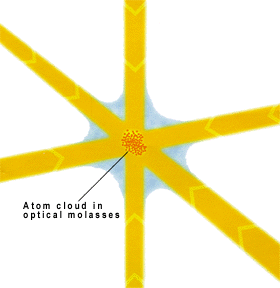
Optical molasses schematic

Optical molasses (OM) is a laser cooling configuration that can produce extremely cold ensembles of neutral atoms. The temperatures can reach as low as a few microkelvins, depending on the atomic species. An optical molasses consists of 3 pairs of counter-propagating orthogonally polarized laser beams intersecting in the region where the atoms are present. The main difference between an optical molasses and a magneto-optical trap (MOT) is the absence of magnetic field in the former. Unlike a MOT, an OM provides only cooling and no trapping.

== History ==
When laser cooling was proposed in 1975, a theoretical limit on the lowest possible temperature was predicted. Known as the Doppler limit, $T_\text{D} = \hbar \Gamma / (2 k_\text{B})$, this was given by the lowest possible temperature attainable considering the cooling of two-level atoms by Doppler cooling and the heating of atoms due to momentum diffusion from the scattering of laser photons. Here $\Gamma$ is the natural line-width of the atomic transition, $\hbar$ is the reduced Planck constant, and $k_\text{B}$ is the Boltzmann constant.

The first experimental realization of optical molasses was achieved in 1985 by Chu et al. at AT&T Bell Laboratories. The authors measured laser cooling of neutral sodium atoms down to the theoretical Doppler cooling limit by observing the fluorescence of a hot atomic beam. By temporarily switching off the laser beams for a fixed time interval, the authors firstly measured the average kinetic energy of the atoms by a time-of-flight technique. The fraction of atoms that left the region while it was in the dark was measured by comparing the brightness of the fluorescence before and after the turnoff. Then velocity distribution and temperature were measured by estimating the dependence of this fraction on the light-off time. The kinetic temperature they obtained was T ≈ 240 μK, not very different from the Doppler cooling limit in the two-level approximation. The size of the optical molasses region was a limiting factor.

Experiments at the National Institute of Standards and Technology in Gaithersburg found the temperature of cooled atoms to be well below the theoretical limit. In 1988, Lett et al. directed sodium atoms through an optical molasses and found the temperatures to be as low as ~40 μk, 6 times lower than the expected 240 μk Doppler cooling limit. Other unexpected properties found in other experiments included significant unexpected insensitivity to laser alignment of the counter-propagating beams.

These unexpected observations led to the development of more sophisticated models of laser cooling that took into account the Zeeman and hyperfine sublevels of the atomic structure. The dynamics of optical pumping between these sublevels allow the cooling of atoms below the Doppler limit.

== Theory ==
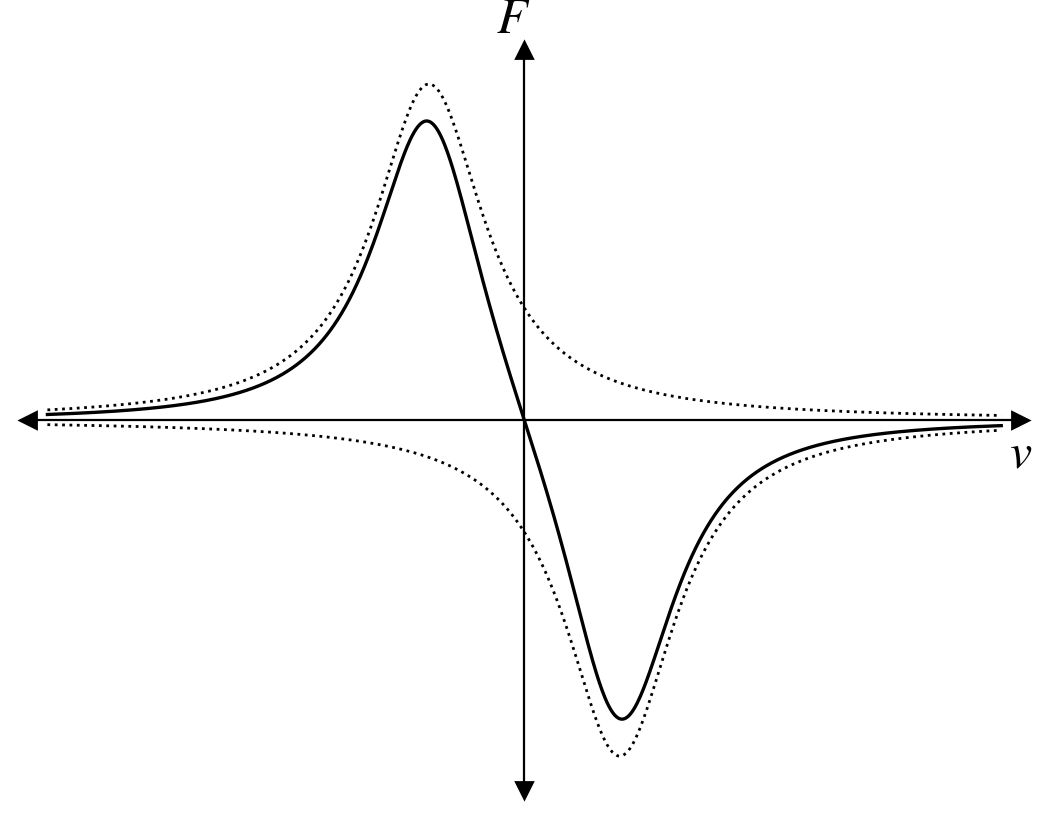
Scattering force experienced by the atom as a function of its velocity, when $\delta = \Gamma/2$. The dotted lines represent the radiation forces due to the two counter-propagating beams, and the solid line is the total force experienced by the atom. The force is negative for $v > 0$ and positive for $v < 0$. This results in a damping effect that slows down the atoms. Near $v = 0$, the force is proportional to $v$ (viscous damping).

The best explanation of the phenomenon of optical molasses is based on the principle of polarization gradient cooling. For one-dimensional optical molasses: Suppose two laser beams approach an atom from opposite directions. Counterpropagating beams of circularly polarized light cause a standing wave, where the light polarization is linear but the direction rotates along the direction of the beams at a very fast rate. Atoms moving in the spatially varying linear polarization have a higher probability density of being in a state that is more susceptible to absorption of light from the beam coming head-on, rather than the beam from behind. This results in a velocity-dependent damping force
$$F = -\alpha v,$$
where
$$\alpha = 4\hbar k^2 \frac{I}{I_0} \frac{2\delta/\Gamma}{[1 + (2\delta/\Gamma)^2]^2}.$$
The variable $\hbar$ is the reduced Planck constant, $I_0$ is the saturation intensity, $\delta$ is the laser detuning, and $\Gamma$ is the linewidth of the atom-cooling transition. For sodium, the cooling (cycling) transition is the ${}^3S_{1/2} (F = 2) \leftrightarrow {}^3P_{3/2}(F = 0)$ transition, driven by laser light at 589 nm.

The optical molasses can reduce the atom temperature to the recoil limit $T_\text{r}$ is set by the energy of the photon emitted in the decay from the J′ to J state, where the J state is the ground-state angular momentum, and the J′ state is the excited-state angular momentum. This temperature is given by
$$k_\text{B} T_\text{r} = \frac{h^2}{M\lambda^2},$$
though practically the limit is a few times this value because of the extreme sensitivity to external magnetic fields in this cooling scheme. Atoms typically reach temperatures on the order of microkelvins, as compared to the doppler limit $T_D \simeq 240$ μK.

The one-dimensional optical molasses can be extended to three dimensions with six counter-propagating laser beams. The total force is the sum from each beam. For example, a study using cesium atoms achieved temperatures as low as ~3 μK, approximately 40 times below the Doppler limit and only slightly above the recoil temperature limit of Cs. The temperature obtained varies with the configuration of the laser polarization and are all higher than the theoretical estimate. Thus the extension has been proven to be effective, despite a few caveats. In 3D experiments, the transverse nature of light leads to the limitation that there will always be polarization gradients. The atoms also see different gradients along different directions, and they may change dramatically during the atom's diffusive movement in the molasses. The trajectories are not straight either, but severely affected by the cooling process. Quantum treatments are needed due to these limitations.

== Relation to magneto-optical trap ==
An optical molasses slows down the atoms but does not provide any trapping force to confine them spatially. A magneto-optical trap employs a 3-dimensional optical molasses along with a spatially varying magnetic field to slow down and confine the atoms.

== See also ==
- Doppler cooling
- Gray molasses
- Magneto-optical trap
- Polarization gradient cooling
- Sub-Doppler cooling
