= Doppler cooling =

Laser cooling technique

Simplified principle of Doppler laser cooling: 1 / A stationary atom sees the laser neither red- nor blue-shifted and does not absorb the photon.; 2 / An atom moving away from the laser sees it red-shifted and does not absorb the photon.; 3.1 / An atom moving towards the laser sees it blue-shifted and absorbs the photon, slowing the atom.; 3.2 / The photon excites the atom, moving an electron to a higher quantum state.; 3.3 / The atom re-emits a photon. As its direction is random, there is no net change in momentum over many photons.

Doppler cooling is a mechanism that can be used to trap and slow the motion of atoms to cool a substance. The term is sometimes used synonymously with laser cooling, though laser cooling includes other techniques.

== History ==
Doppler cooling was simultaneously proposed by two groups in 1975, the first being David J. Wineland and Hans Georg Dehmelt and the second being Theodor W. Hänsch and Arthur Leonard Schawlow. It was first demonstrated by Wineland, Drullinger, and Walls in 1978 and shortly afterwards by Neuhauser, Hohenstatt, Toschek and Dehmelt. Steven Chu, Claude Cohen-Tannoudji and William D. Phillips were awarded the 1997 Nobel Prize in Physics for their work in laser cooling and atom trapping.

== Mechanism ==
Doppler cooling involves light with frequency tuned slightly below an electronic transition in an atom. Because the light is detuned to the "red" (i.e. at lower frequency) of the transition, the atoms will absorb more photons if they move towards the light source, due to the Doppler effect.

Consider the simplest case of 1D motion on the x axis. Let the photon be traveling in the +x direction and the atom in the −x direction. In each absorption event, the atom loses a momentum equal to the momentum of the photon. The atom, which is now in the excited state, emits a photon spontaneously but randomly along +x or −x. Momentum is returned to the atom. If the photon was emitted along +x then there is no net change; however, if the photon was emitted along −x, then the atom is moving more slowly in either −x or +x. Counter-propagating sets of laser beams in all three Cartesian dimensions may be used to cool the three motional degrees of freedom of the atom.

The net result of the absorption and emission process is a reduced speed of the atom, on the condition that its initial speed is larger than the recoil velocity from scattering a single photon. If the absorption and emission are repeated many times, the mean velocity, and therefore the kinetic energy of the atom, will be reduced. Since the temperature of an ensemble of atoms is a measure of the random internal kinetic energy, this is equivalent to cooling the atoms.

== Limits ==
=== Minimum temperature ===
The Doppler temperature (Doppler cooling limit) is the minimum temperature achievable with Doppler cooling.

When a photon is absorbed by an atom counter-propagating to the light source, its velocity is decreased by momentum conservation. When the absorbed photon is spontaneously emitted by the excited atom, the atom receives a momentum kick in a random direction. The spontaneous emissions are isotropic and therefore these momentum kicks average to zero for the mean velocity. On the other hand, the mean squared velocity, $\langle v^2\rangle$, is not zero in the random process, and thus heat is supplied to the atom. At equilibrium, the heating and cooling rates are equal, which sets a limit on the amount by which the atom can be cooled. As the transitions used for Doppler cooling have broad natural linewidths $\gamma$ (measured in radians per second), this sets the lower limit to the temperature of the atoms after cooling to be

$$T_{\mathrm{Doppler}} = \hbar \gamma /(2k_\text{B}) ,$$

where $k_\text{B}$ is the Boltzmann constant and $\hbar$ is the reduced Planck constant. This is usually much higher than the recoil temperature, which is the temperature associated with the momentum gained from the spontaneous emission of a photon.

The Doppler limit has been verified with a gas of metastable helium.

==== Sub-Doppler cooling ====
Temperatures well below the Doppler limit have been achieved with various laser cooling methods, including Sisyphus cooling, evaporative cooling, and resolved sideband cooling. The theory of Doppler cooling assumes an atom with a simple two level structure, whereas most atomic species which are laser cooled have complicated hyperfine structure. Mechanisms such as Sisyphus cooling due to multiple ground states lead to temperatures lower than the Doppler limit.

=== Maximum concentration ===
The concentration must be minimal to prevent the absorption of the photons into the gas in the form of heat. This absorption happens when two atoms collide with each other while one of them has an excited electron. There is then a possibility of the excited electron dropping back to the ground state with its extra energy liberated in additional kinetic energy to the colliding atoms—which heats the atoms. This works against the cooling process and therefore limits the maximum concentration of gas that can be cooled using this method.

=== Atomic structure ===
Only certain atoms and ions have optical transitions amenable to laser cooling, since it is extremely difficult to generate the amounts of laser power needed at wavelengths much shorter than 300 nm. Furthermore, the more hyperfine structure an atom has, the more ways there are for it to emit a photon from the upper state and not return to its original state, putting it in a dark state and removing it from the cooling process. It is possible to use other lasers, referred to as repump lasers, to optically pump those atoms back into the excited state and try again. However, the more complex the hyperfine structure is, the more (narrow-band, frequency locked) lasers are required. The common rubidium magneto-optical trap, for example, requires one repump laser. Since frequency-locked lasers are both complex and expensive, atoms which need more than one extra repump laser are rarely cooled. This is also the reason why molecules are in general difficult to laser cool: in addition to hyperfine structure, molecules also have rovibronic couplings and so can also decay into excited rotational or vibrational states. However, laser cooling of molecules has been demonstrated, first with SrF molecules, and subsequently with other diatomics such as CaF and YO.

== Applications ==
One use for Doppler cooling is the optical molasses technique. This process itself forms a part of the magneto-optical trap but it can be used independently.

Doppler cooling is also used in spectroscopy and metrology, where cooling allows narrower spectroscopic features. For example, all of the best atomic clock technologies involve Doppler cooling at some point.

Atomic ions, trapped in an ion trap, can be cooled with a single laser beam as long as that beam has a component along all three motional degrees of freedom. This is in contrast to the six beams required to trap neutral atoms. The original laser cooling experiments were performed on ions in ion traps. (In theory, neutral atoms could be cooled with a single beam if they could be trapped in a deep trap, but in practice neutral traps are much shallower than ion traps and a single recoil event can be enough to kick a neutral atom out of the trap.)

== See also ==
- Laser cooling
- Magneto-optical trap
- Resolved sideband cooling
