= Optical pumping =

Use of light to raise electrons to higher energy states

Optical pumping of a laser rod (bottom) with an arc lamp (top). Red: hot. Blue: cold. Green: light. Non-green arrows: water flow. Solid colors: metal. Light colors: fused quartz.

Optical pumping is a process in which light is used to raise (or "pump") electrons from a lower energy level in an atom or molecule to a higher one. It is commonly used in laser construction to pump the active laser medium so as to achieve population inversion. The technique was developed by the 1966 Nobel Prize winner Alfred Kastler in the early 1950s.

Optical pumping is also used to cyclically pump electrons bound within an atom or molecule to a well-defined quantum state. For the simplest case of coherent two-level optical pumping of an atomic species containing a single outer-shell electron, this means that the electron is coherently pumped to a single hyperfine sublevel (labeled $m_F\!$), which is defined by the polarization of the pump laser along with the quantum selection rules. Upon optical pumping, the atom is said to be oriented in a specific $m_F\!$ sublevel, however, due to the cyclic nature of optical pumping, the bound electron will actually be undergoing repeated excitation and decay between the upper and lower state sublevels. The frequency and polarization of the pump laser determine the $m_F\!$ sublevel in which the atom is oriented.

In practice, completely coherent optical pumping may not occur due to power-broadening of the linewidth of a transition and undesirable effects such as hyperfine structure trapping and radiation trapping. Therefore the orientation of the atom depends more generally on the frequency, intensity, polarization, and spectral bandwidth of the laser as well as the linewidth and transition probability of the absorbing transition.

An optical pumping experiment is commonly found in physics undergraduate laboratories, using rubidium gas isotopes and displaying the ability of radiofrequency (MHz) electromagnetic radiation to effectively pump and unpump these isotopes.

== See also ==
- Atomic coherence
- Laser pumping
- Optical cavity
- Rabi cycle
