= Magneto-optical trap =

Apparatus for trapping and cooling neutral atoms

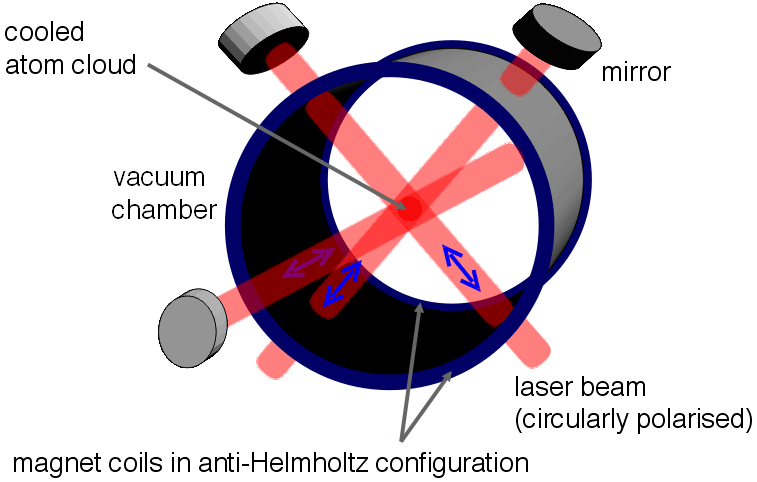
Experimental setup of the MOT

In atomic, molecular, and optical physics, a magneto-optical trap (MOT) is an apparatus which uses laser cooling and a spatially varying magnetic field to create a trap which can produce samples of cold neutral atoms. Temperatures achieved in a MOT can be as low as several microkelvins, depending on the atomic species.

A MOT is formed from the intersection of the zero of a weak quadrupolar magnetic field and six circularly polarized red-detuned optical molasses beams. Counterpropagating beams have opposite handed polarization. As atoms travel away from the zero field at the center of the trap, the spatially varying Zeeman shift brings an atomic transition into resonance with the laser beams. The polarization of the beam propagating in the opposite direction of this atomic motion is chosen to drive this transition. The absorption of these photons gives rise to a scattering force that pushes the atoms back towards the center of the trap.

In this way, a MOT is able to trap and cool atoms over repeated absorption and spontaneous emission cycles with initial velocities of hundreds of meters per second down to tens of centimeters per second (again, depending upon the atomic species).

== Theoretical description of a MOT ==
Two coils in an anti-Helmholtz configuration are used to generate a weak quadrupolar magnetic field; by convention, the coils are separated along the $z$-axis. In the proximity of the field zero, located halfway between the two coils along the $z$-direction, the field gradient is uniform and the field itself varies linearly with displacement from the field zero. For this discussion, consider an atom with ground and excited states with $J=0$ and $J=1$, respectively, where $J$ is the magnitude of the total angular momentum vector. Due to the Zeeman effect, the $J\neq0$ states will each be split into $2J+1$ sublevels with associated values of $m_J$, denoted by $|J,m_J\rangle$. This results in spatially-dependent energy shifts of the excited-state sublevels, as the Zeeman shift is linearly proportional to the field strength. As a note, the Maxwell equation $\nabla\cdot\mathbf{B}=0$ implies that the field gradient is twice as strong along the $z$-direction than in the $x$ and $y$-directions, and thus the trapping force along the $z$-direction is twice as strong.

In combination with the magnetic field, three pairs of counter-propagating circularly-polarized laser beams are sent in along orthogonal axes, such that their intersection lies at the location of the magnetic field zero. The beams are red-detuned from the $J=0\rightarrow J=1$ transition by an amount $\delta$ such that $\delta\equiv \nu_0- \nu_L > 0$, or equivalently, $\nu_L=\nu_0-\delta$, where $\nu_L$ is the frequency of the laser beams and $\nu_0$ is the frequency of the transition. The beams must be circularly polarized to ensure that photon absorption can only occur for certain transitions between the ground state $|0,0\rangle$ and the sublevels of the excited state $|1,m_J\rangle$, where $m_J=-1,0,1$. In other words, the circularly-polarized beams enforce selection rules on the allowed electric dipole transitions between states.

Now consider an atom which is displaced from the field zero in the $+z$-direction. The Zeeman effect shifts the energy of the $|J=1,m_J=-1\rangle$ state lower in energy, decreasing the energy gap between it and the $|J=0,m_J=0\rangle$ state; that is, the frequency associated with the transition decreases. Red-detuned $\sigma^-$photons, which only drive $\Delta m_J=-1$ transitions, propagating in the $-z$-direction thus become closer to resonance as the atom travels further from the center of the trap, increasing the scattering rate and scattering force. When an atom absorbs a $\sigma^-$photon, it is excited to the $|J=1,m_J=-1\rangle$ state and gets a "kick" of one photon recoil momentum, $\hbar k$, in the direction opposite to its motion, where $k=2\pi\nu_0/c$. The atom, now in an excited state, will then spontaneously emit a photon in a random direction as it returns to the ground state, which will result in another momentum "kick". Because this "kick" from the emitted photon occurs in a random direction, the net effect of many absorption-spontaneous emission events will result in the atom being "pushed" back towards the field-zero of the trap. This trapping process will also occur for an atom moving in the $-z$-direction if $\sigma^+$photons are traveling in the $+z$-direction, the only difference being that the excitation will be from $|J=0,m_J=0\rangle$ to $|J=1,m_J =+1\rangle$ since the magnetic field is negative for $z<0$. Since the magnetic field gradient near the trap center is uniform, the same phenomenon of trapping and cooling occurs along the $x$ and $y$-directions as well. At the center of the trap, the magnetic field is zero and atoms are "dark" to incident red-detuned photons. That is, at the center of the trap, the Zeeman shift is zero for all states and so the transition frequency $\nu_0$ from $J=0\rightarrow J=1$ remains unchanged. The detuning of the photons from this frequency means that there will not be an appreciable amount of absorption by atoms in the center of the trap, hence the term "dark". Thus, the coldest, slowest moving atoms accumulate in the center of the MOT where they scatter very few photons.

The radiation pressure force that atoms experience in a MOT is given by:

$\mathbf{F}_\mathrm{MOT}=-\alpha\mathbf{v}-\frac{\alpha g \mu_B}{\hbar k}\mathbf{r}\nabla \|\mathbf{B}\|,$

where
$$\alpha = 4\hbar k^2 \frac{I}{I_0} \frac{2\delta/\Gamma}{[1 + (2\delta/\Gamma)^2]^2}$$
is the damping coefficient, $g$ is the Landé g-factor, $\mu_B$ is the Bohr magneton, $\hbar$ is the reduced Planck constant, $I_0$ is the saturation intensity, $\delta$ is the laser detuning, $\Gamma$ is the linewidth of the atom-cooling transition and $k$ is the norm of its wavevector.

== Atomic structure necessary for magneto-optical trapping ==
As a thermal atom at room temperature has many thousands of times the momentum of a single photon, the cooling of an atom must involve many absorption-spontaneous emission cycles, with the atom losing up to ħk of momenta each cycle. Because of this, if an atom is to be laser cooled, it must possess a specific energy level structure known as a closed optical loop, where following an excitation-spontaneous emission event, the atom is always returned to its original state. ^{85}Rubidium, for example, has a closed optical loop between the $5S_{1/2}\ F=3$ state and the $5P_{3/2}\ F=4$ state. Once in the excited state, the atom is forbidden from decaying to any of the $5P_{1/2}$ states, which would not conserve parity, and is also forbidden from decaying to the $5S_{1/2}\ F=2$ state, which would require an angular momentum change of −2, which cannot be supplied by a single photon.

Many atoms that do not contain closed optical loops can still be laser cooled, however, by using repump lasers which re-excite the population back into the optical loop after it has decayed to a state outside of the cooling cycle. The magneto-optical trapping of rubidium 85, for example, involves cycling on the closed $5S_{1/2}\ F=3\to5P_{3/2}\ F=4$ transition. On excitation, however, the detuning necessary for cooling gives a small, but non-zero overlap with the $5P_{3/2}\ F=3$ state. If an atom is excited to this state, which occurs roughly every thousand cycles, the atom is then free to decay either the $F=3$, light coupled upper hyperfine state, or the $F=2$ "dark" lower hyperfine state. If it falls back to the dark state, the atom stops cycling between ground and excited state, and the cooling and trapping of this atom stops. A repump laser which is resonant with the $5S_{1/2}\ F=2\to5P_{3/2}\ F=3$ transition is used to recycle the population back into the optical loop so that cooling can continue.

== Apparatus ==
=== Laser ===
All magneto-optical traps require at least one trapping laser plus any necessary repumper lasers (see above). These lasers require frequency stability, with a linewidth much less than the Doppler width and ideally less than or on the order of the linewidth of the cooling transition. Because of their low cost, compact size and ease of use, laser diodes are used for many of the standard MOT species. The frequency of these lasers is typically controlled using servo systems and a frequency reference, for example saturated absorption spectroscopy of an atomic vapor for reference to an atomic transition and the Pound-Drever-Hall technique to generate a locking signal from an optical cavity which serves as a reference.

By employing a 2-dimensional diffraction grating or a pyramid arrangement of mirrors, it is possible to generate the configuration of laser beams required for a magneto-optical trap from a single laser beam and thus have a very compact magneto-optical trap.

A rubidium magneto-optical trap forming and dissipating as the magnetic field is toggled.

=== Vacuum chamber ===
The MOT cloud is loaded from a background of thermal vapour or from an atomic beam slowed down to the capture velocity using a Zeeman slower. However, the trapping potential in a magneto-optical trap is small in comparison to thermal energies of atoms and most collisions between trapped atoms and the background gas supply enough energy to the trapped atom for ejection from the trap. If the background pressure is too high, atoms leave the trap faster than they can be loaded, and the trap does not form. This means that the MOT cloud only forms in a vacuum chamber with a background pressure of less than 100 micropascals (10^{−9} bar)}.

== Limitations of the magneto-optical trap ==
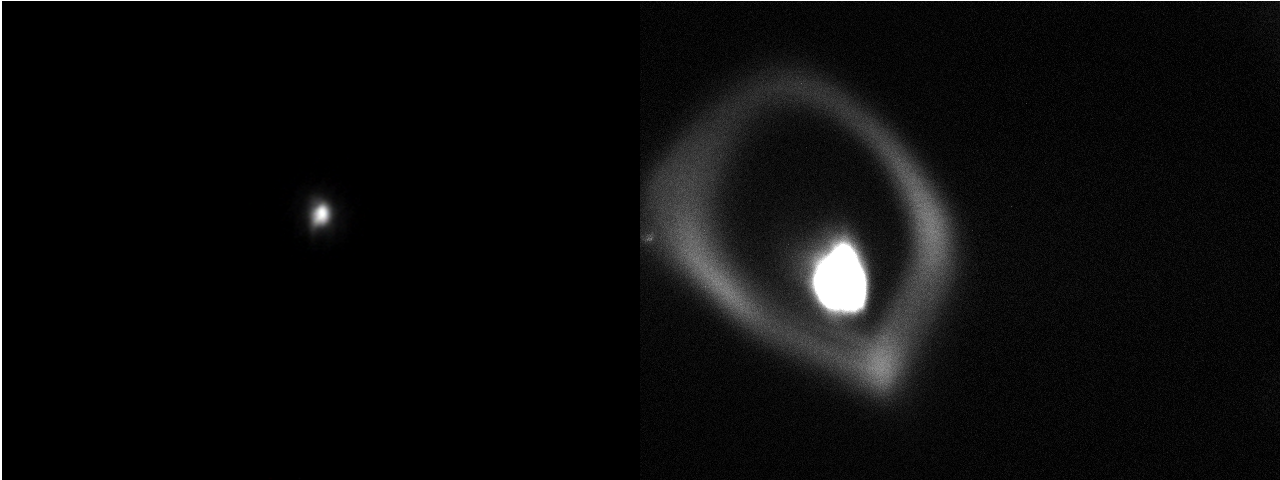
A MOT cloud in two different density regimes:If the density of the MOT is high enough, the MOT cloud goes from having a Gaussian density distribution (left), to something more exotic (right). In the right hand image, the density is so high that atoms have been blown out of the central trapping region by radiation pressure, to then form a toroidal racetrack mode around it.

Magneto-optical trap with a racetrack mode

The minimum temperature and maximum density of a cloud in a magneto-optical trap is limited by the spontaneously emitted photon in cooling each cycle. While the directionality in atom excitation gives directional cooling and trapping forces, the emission of the spontaneously emitted photon is spherically symmetric and therefore sets a lower bound on the temperature. The momentum kicks from the spontaneously emitted photons act as steps in a random walk about zero momentum, leading to the Doppler cooling limit.

The density is also limited by the spontaneously emitted photon. As the density of the cloud increases, the chance that the spontaneously emitted photon will leave the cloud without interacting with any further atoms tends to zero. The absorption, by a neighboring atom, of a spontaneously emitted photon gives a 2ħk momentum kick between the emitting and absorbing atom which can be seen as a repulsive force, similar to coulomb repulsion, which limits the maximum density of the cloud.

As of 2022 the method has been demonstrated to work up to triatomic molecules.

== Applications ==
A magneto-optical trap is usually the first step to achieving Bose–Einstein condensation. Atoms are cooled in a MOT down to a few times the recoil limit then cooled further by sub-Doppler cooling method (if necessary) and loaded into a dipole trap and evaporatively cooled which lowers the temperature and increases the density to the required phase space density for condensation.

A MOT of ^{133}Cs was used to make some of the best measurements of CP violation.

MOTs are used in a number of quantum technologies (i.e. cold atom gravity gradiometers) and have been deployed on several platforms (i.e. UAVs) and in several environments (i.e. down boreholes).

== See also ==
- Laser cooling
- Dipole trap
- Zeeman slower

== Other References ==
- "The Nobel prize in physics 1997". Nobelprize.org. October 15, 1997.
- Raab E. L.; Prentiss M.; Cable A.; Chu S.; Pritchard D.E. (1987). "Trapping of neutral sodium atoms with radiation pressure". Physical Review Letters. 59 (23): 2631–2634. Bibcode:1987PhRvL..59.2631R. doi:10.1103/PhysRevLett.59.2631. PMID 10035608.
- Metcalf, Harold J. & Straten, Peter van der (1999). Laser Cooling and Trapping. Springer-Verlag New York, Inc. ISBN 978-0-387-98728-6.
- Monroe C, Swann W, Robinson H, Wieman C (1990-09-24). "Very cold trapped atoms in a vapor cell". Physical Review Letters. 65 (13): 1571–1574. Bibcode:1990PhRvL..65.1571M. doi:10.1103/PhysRevLett.65.1571. PMID 10042304.
- Liwag, John Waruel F. Cooling and trapping of 87Rb atoms in a magneto-optical trap using low-power diode lasers, Thesis 621.39767 L767c (1999)
- K B Davis; M O Mewes; M R Andrews; N J van Druten; D S Durfee; D M Kurn & W Ketterle (1997-11-27). "Bose-Einstein Condensation in a Gas of Sodium Atoms". Physical Review Letters. 75 (22): 3969–3973. Bibcode:1995PhRvL..75.3969D. doi:10.1103/PhysRevLett.75.3969. PMID 10059782. S2CID 975895. Archived from the original on 2019-04-01.
- G. Puentes (July 2020). "Design and Construction of Magnetic Coils for Quantum Magnetism Experiments". Quantum Reports. 2 (3): 378–387. doi:10.3390/quantum2030026. hdl:11336/146025.
