= John Doyle (physicist) =

Cold atom physicist

John Morrissey Doyle
- Education: Massachusetts Institute of Technology (B.S., Ph.D.)
- Occupations: Atomic physicist and academic
- Known for: Cold molecule physics, EDM searches
- Awards: Humboldt Research Award (2003); JSPS Fellowship (2005); Herbert P. Broida Prize (2021); Norman F. Ramsey Prize (2024); William Meggers Award (2025)
- Scientific career
- Fields: Physics
- Workplaces: Harvard University
- Thesis: Energy Distribution Measurements of Magnetically Trapped Spin-Polarized Hydrogen: Evaporative Cooling and Surface Sticking (1991)
- Doctoral advisor: Thomas J. Greytak and Daniel Kleppner

John Morrissey Doyle is an American physicist working in the field of atomic, molecular, and optical physics and precision particle physics. He is the Henry B. Silsbee Professor of Physics, director of the Japanese Undergraduate Research Exchange Program, co-director of the Harvard Quantum Initiative as well as co-director of the Ph.D. program in quantum science and engineering at Harvard University.

Doyle is best known for his work on cooling and trapping of atoms and molecules as well as for his contributions to the spectroscopy and quantum control of trapped atomic and molecular ensembles. The work of the Doyle group and its collaborators has been contributing to research in AMO (Atomic, Molecular, and Optical) and low-energy elementary particle physics, with implications for molecular structure elucidations, quantum information, and explorations beyond the Standard Model of physics. He is a Fellow of the Fulbright Program and the Japanese Society for the Promotion of Science (JSPS).

Doyle received the Alexander von Humboldt Research Award in 2003 and was the recipient of the 2021 Broida Award and the 2024 Norman F. Ramsey Prize of the American Physical Society (APS). In 2025, he received the William F. Meggers Award by Optica. In 2022, he was elected to the presidential line of the APS, and was APS President in 2025. Currently, John Doyle is Immediate Past President of the APS.

== Education ==
Doyle obtained his bachelor's degree in electrical engineering from the Massachusetts Institute of Technology (MIT) in 1986 and his Ph.D. in physics in 1991, likewise from MIT. He stayed on as a postdoctoral associate from 1991 to 1993.

== Career ==
Doyle joined Harvard University as an assistant professor in 1993, was promoted to John L. Loeb Associate Professor of the Natural Sciences in 1997, and was appointed as a professor of physics in 1999. Since 2015, he has been the Henry B. Silsbee Professor of Physics at Harvard University and since 2019 a visiting professor at Okayama University.

Doyle was a founding co-director of Center for Ultracold Atoms, a National Science Foundation Physics Frontier Center from 2000 to 2020 and the founding director of the Harvard Quantum Optics Center from 2010 to 2017. Since 2006, he has been serving as the founder and director of the Japan-US Undergraduate Research Exchange Program and is a founding co-director of the Ph.D. program in quantum science and engineering as well as the Harvard Quantum Initiative.

He served as guest editor of a special issue of the European Physical Journal D on Cold Molecules (2004), of ChemPhysChem on Cold Molecules (2009), of Molecular Physics on Manipulation of Molecules via Electromagnetic Fields (2013), of the Journal of Molecular Spectroscopy on Laser Cooling of Molecules (2021) and of a Themed Collection of Physical Chemistry Chemical Physics (PCCP) on Quantum Computing and Quantum Information Storage (2021).

== Research ==
The Doyle group has conducted research on atomic and molecular cooling techniques, such as buffer-gas cooling and the buffer-gas beam, as well as laser-cooling and trapping of molecules, including polyatomic, at ultracold temperatures. His research has involved laser and microwave detection and spectroscopy of molecules, investigation of atomic and molecular collisions, utilization of cold molecules for particle physics (especially the search for CP-violating physics beyond the Standard Model through EDM searches), and the development of new quantum information processing platforms using ultracold molecules confined in electromagnetic traps. In addition, the Doyle group developed a new technique for producing heavy, polar radical molecules in the cold and ultracold regime to search for new particles in the 10-100 TeV mass range.

=== Cold molecules interactions and quantum science ===
Doyle has made contributions to AMO physics in the context of quantum science. His research group developed a general technique for cooling and loading molecules into traps, combining cryogenic technology with laser-based cooling and control methods. The group has applied this technique to trap diatomic calcium monofluoride (CaF) molecules and more recently extended it to polyatomic molecules, demonstrating trapped linear calcium monohydroxide (CaOH) molecules and a beam of nonlinear calcium monomethoxide (CaOCH3) molecules, all at ultracold temperatures. In one of his highly cited studies, he demonstrated a loading technique for magnetic trapping of calcium monohydride (CaH) molecules at millikelvin temperatures, achieved via elastic collisions with cryogenic helium serving as a cold buffer gas, while employing Zeeman spectroscopy to precisely determine the quantity of trapped molecules and their temperature. He also studied strong qubit-cavity coupling, and examined quantum information protocols and molecular bit coherence. In addition, he has offered insights into the challenges of cooling molecules to their ground state, as well as the potential applications in fields such as quantum computing and precision measurement and particle physics.

Doyle's research in the area of quantum computing includes methods for producing both diatomic and polyatomic molecules in optical tweezer arrays, demonstrating long rotational coherence times for CaF qubits based on the molecule's rotational states. He also co-proposed integrating isolated polar molecules with mesoscopic solid-state devices to achieve quantum-level control. In addition, he and David Patterson developed a technique for detecting and quantifying chirality in gas-phase molecules using nonlinear resonant phase-sensitive microwave spectroscopy.

In another line of work, Doyle and collaborators demonstrated the production of Bose-Einstein condensates of metastable helium using only buffer-gas loading into a magnetic trap combined with evaporative cooling. With the group of Yoshihiro Takahashi at Kyoto University, he assisted with the production and study of quantum degenerate Bose-Fermi and Fermi-Fermi mixtures of Yb and Li atoms, achieving simultaneous quantum degeneracy in mixtures composed of alkali and alkaline-earth-like atoms Li and Yb. The Doyle group also pioneered the control of cold collisions using applied electromagnetic fields.

=== Collision processes of molecules ===
A major research interest of Doyle has been molecular collision processes. His investigation on the magnetically trapped imidogen (NH) molecules and their collisions with both 3He and 4He isotopes provided insights into the interplay between molecular structure and collisional energy transfer at low temperatures. In collaboration with David Patterson and Edem Tsikata, he was able to observe larger (>5 atoms) molecules moving slowly at cold temperatures (<10 K), providing insights into the behavior of larger molecules under such conditions. Moreover, by combining the techniques of Stark deceleration, magnetic trapping, and cryogenic buffer-gas cooling, he in collaboration with Jun Ye achieved the first experimental observation of cold collisions between two different species of state-selected neutral polar molecules.

=== Standard model and electric dipole moment ===
Together with David DeMille and Gerald Gabrielse as part of the ACME collaboration, Doyle made use of thorium monoxide (ThO) to measure the electron electric dipole moment (eEDM), achieving an upper limit of |d(e)| < 8.7 × 10-29 e·cm (90% confidence), significantly improving sensitivity and impacting extensions to the Standard Model at the multi-TeV scale. The same team later achieved another improvement by about a factor of ten in the eEDM limit, |d(e)| < 1.1 × 10-29 e·cm (90% confidence). This improved experimental limit on the electric dipole moment of the electron was enabled by using a buffer-gas beam of cold ThO molecules and measuring the spin precession of electrons subjected to a huge intramolecular electric field. Meanwhile, he alongside his collaborators expanded the range of species for similar searched for eEDM by the highly sensitive YbOH and SrOH molecules.

=== Buffer gas cooling of NH radicals ===
In the 1990s and 2000s, Doyle demonstrated buffer gas cooling for numerous atoms and small molecules, including VO, NH, CaF, CaH, and NH_{3}. His collaborative work introduced the technique of buffer-gas cooling and loading of atoms and molecules into magnetic traps, applicable to species trappable at buffer gas temperatures as low as 240 mK, and also showed the direct loading and cooling of a thermal beam into a cryogenic helium buffer gas. He further contributed to the development of a general cooling method using a novel beam-loaded buffer gas technique that could be applied to a wide range of molecules in a molecular beam to achieve translational temperatures under 6 K.

=== Buffer gas beams ===
In collaboration with David DeMille, Doyle developed a new form of molecular beam, known as the buffer gas beam. This was later followed by him and Patterson creating a new type of cold, slow molecular beam, the hydrodynamically enhanced cryogenic buffer gas beam (CBGB). This technique produces molecular beams that are comparably cold to traditional techniques, but with a much lower velocity in the laboratory frame and a much higher brightness and flux, especially for molecular radicals. The buffer gas beam has found applications in laser cooling of molecules, precision spectroscopy, and in fundamental physics experiments.

== Awards and honors ==
- 2010 – Fellow, Japanese Society for the Promotion of Science (JSPS)
- 2021 – Herbert P. Broida Award, American Physical Society
- 2024 – Norman F. Ramsey Prize, American Physical Society
- 2025 – Member of the National Academy of Sciences
- 2025 – William Meggers Award

== Selected articles ==
- Weinstein, J. D., DeCarvalho, R., Guillet, T., Friedrich, B., & Doyle, J. M. (1998). Magnetic trapping of calcium monohydride molecules at millikelvin temperatures. Nature, 395(6698), 148–150.
- Doyle, J., Friedrich, B., Krems, R. V., & Masnou-Seeuws, F. (2004). Quo vadis, cold molecules?. The European Physical Journal D, 31, 149–164.
- André, A., DeMille, D., Doyle, J. M., Lukin, M. D., Maxwell, S. E., Rabl, P., ... & Zoller, P. (2006). A coherent all-electrical interface between polar molecules and mesoscopic superconducting resonators. Nature Physics, 2(9), 636–642.
- ACME collaboration, Baron, J., Campbell, W. C., DeMille, D., Doyle, J. M., Gabrielse, G., ... & West, A. D. (2014). Order of magnitude smaller limit on the electric dipole moment of the electron. Science, 343(6168), 269–272.
- ACME Collaboration, Andreev V. 1 5 Ang DG 1 DeMille, D., Doyle, J.M., Gabrielse G., Haefner, J., Hutzler, NR, Lasner, Z., Meisenhelder, C., O'Leary, BR, Panda, CD, West, AD, West, EP, Wu, X. (2018). Improved limit on the electric dipole moment of the electron. Nature, 562(7727), 355–360.
