= Tanya Zelevinsky =

American scientist

- Education: MIT and Harvard University
- Known for: High-precision spectroscopy and Quantum Optics
- Awards: Fellow of the American Physical Society (2018); Francis M. Pipkin Award Recipient (2019)

Tanya Zelevinsky is a professor of physics at Columbia University. Her research focuses on high-precision spectroscopy of cold molecules for fundamental physics measurements, including molecular lattice clocks, ultracold molecule photodissociation, as well as cooling and quantum state manipulation techniques for diatomic molecules with the goal of testing the Standard Model of particle physics. Zelevinsky graduated from MIT in 1999 and received her Ph.D. from Harvard University in 2004 with Gerald Gabrielse as her thesis advisor. Subsequently, she worked as a post-doctoral research associate at the Joint Institute for Laboratory Astrophysics (JILA) with Jun Ye on atomic lattice clocks. She joined Columbia University as an associate professor of physics in 2008. Professor Zelevinsky became a Fellow of the American Physical Society in 2018 and received the Francis M. Pipkin Award in 2019.

== Research ==
Zelevinsky is known for her pioneering experiments with ultracold strontium, an alkaline earth element. Zelevinsky performed seminal work on the strontium optical lattice clock in the group of Jun Ye at JILA and was the first to use narrow-linewidth laser light to create diatomic molecules of this class in an optical lattice at ultracold temperatures, determining their molecular binding energies to a greater precision than was previously achievable in molecular beam and heat-pipe studies. This has the potential to furnish an ensemble of molecular clocks where quantized molecular vibrations determine the 'ticking' rate.

Together with Robert Moszyński and her students, Zelevinsky settled a long-standing question about the role of quantum interference in the angular patterns of molecular photofragments. At a temperature of tens of millikelvin, the work constitutes one of the first clear demonstrations of quantum photochemistry. Additionally, Zelevinsky is exploring ways to experimentally cool molecules in order to manipulate and study them using a combination of buffer gas cooling and laser cooling with the goal of creating magneto-optical traps of exotic gases. Zelevinsky is also one of the principal investigators of the CeNTREX collaboration with David DeMille to search for the deformation in the shape of atomic nuclei known as a Schiff moment using the thallium fluoride molecule.

== Education ==
While an undergraduate at Massachusetts Institute of Technology, Zelevinsky attended a summer school on atomic physics in Los Alamos. She recalls this as an important part of her career and said "I really enjoyed the fact that only two or three investigators work on the experiments and that one can experience and understand the whole project".
