= CP violating moments =

Theoretical disproof

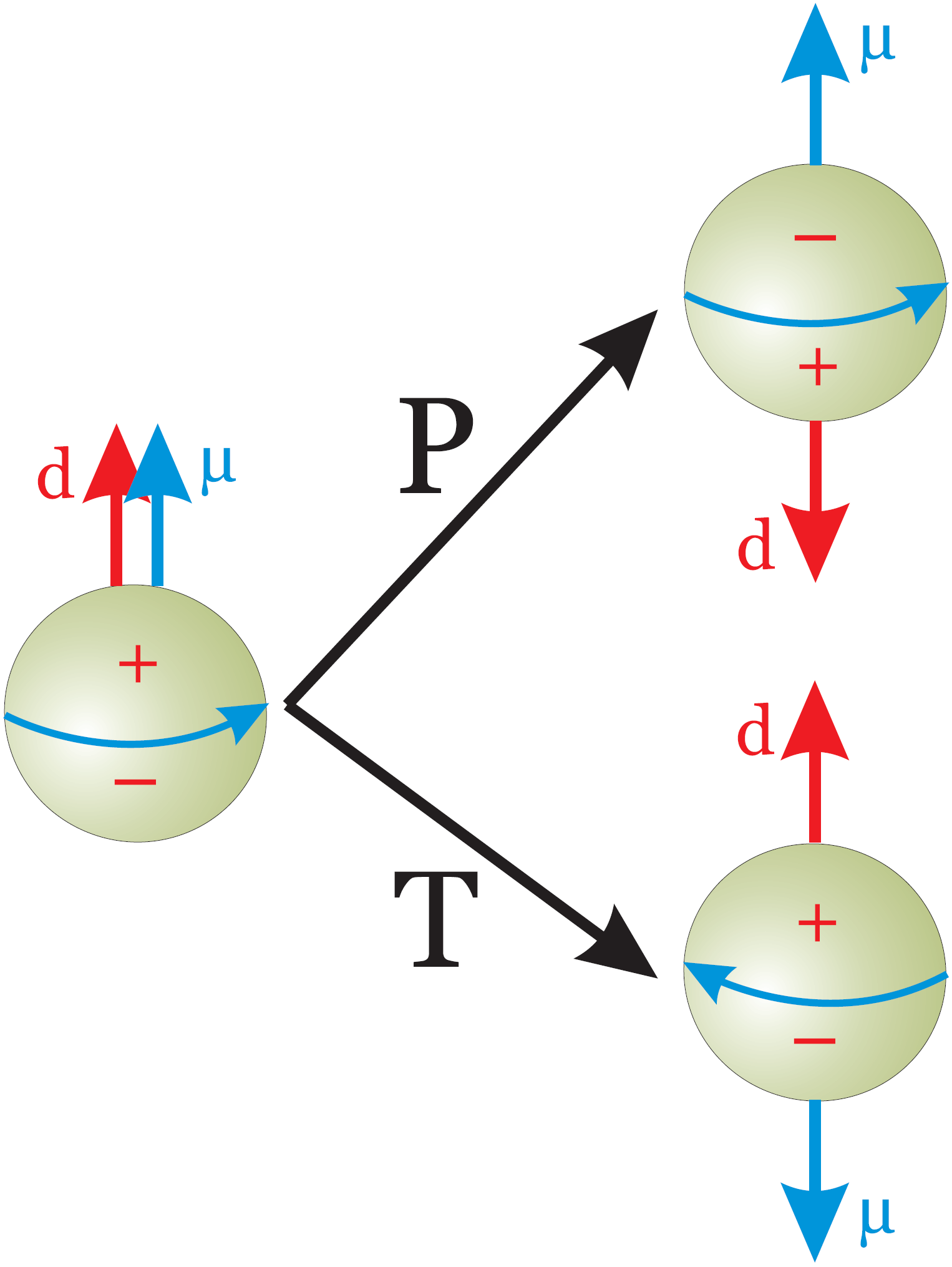
A particle (left) with a magnetic moment, μ (blue), has an associated spin. The particle may have a permanent electric dipole moment (EDM), d (red), which arises from separation of positive and negative charges. A parity (P) transformation does not change μ but reverses the EDM sign. A time-reversal (T) transforms does not change the EDM but flips μ. The particle could be a composite particle, such as a neutron, or a fundamental particle, such as an electron.

Searching for the violation of time-reversal symmetry (T) is actively pursued to understand the Standard Model of particle physics and to discover new physics beyond the Standard Model. These searches are highly motivated by problems such as Baryogenesis and the Strong CP problem. Assuming CPT symmetry, T violation is equivalent to CP violation - the combined violation of charge conjugation (C) and parity symmetry (P), thus CP violation and T symmetry violation are often used interchangeably.

A powerful means to discover new sources of CP violation is to search for CP violating moments, such as permanent electric dipole moments (EDM) of the electron, neutron, or atoms. Searches for these moments is an active frontier of precision measurement physics, as improved constraints on EDM magnitudes to smaller values helps rule out new physics theories which predict CP violation larger than that predicted by the Standard Model. So far all measurements of CP violating moments have been consistent with zero.

== Theory ==
The paradigm CP violating moment is an EDM, which violates both P and T symmetries. Under time reversal, a particle's magnetic dipole moment is reversed, whereas the electric dipole moment is unchanged, which maximally violates time reversal symmetry. Under parity, the electric dipole moment changes its direction but not the magnetic dipole moment, violating parity symmetry.

There are two main motivations to search for CP violation. One is Andrei Sakharov's condition that T violation is necessary to explain the asymmetry between matter and antimatter in the universe (baryogenesis). The second motivation is the strong CP problem, where an angle in the Standard Model, $\bar \theta$, that could take any value from 0 to 2π is unexpectedly small - it is bounded to less than 10^{−10} radians from neutron EDM measurements. Any CP violating moment is sensitive to the new physics that could help explain baryogenesis. To address the strong CP problem the CP violating moment must be sensitive to strong interactions, which generally means the measurement must be of a Schiff moment or a nucleon EDM, e.g. the neutron EDM.

== Neutron EDM ==
The neutron electric dipole moment (nEDM), d_{n}, is a measure for the distribution of positive and negative charge inside the neutron. A nonzero electric dipole moment can only exist if the centers of the negative and positive charge distribution inside the particle do not coincide. The current best measured limit for d_{n} is (0.0±1.1)×10^{−26} e⋅cm.

=== Standard Model prediction ===
As it is depicted above, in order to generate a nonzero nEDM one needs processes that violate CP symmetry. CP violation has been observed in weak interactions and is included in the Standard Model of particle physics via the CP-violating phase in the CKM matrix. However, the amount of CP violation is very small and therefore also the contribution to the nEDM: |d_{n}| ~ 10^{−31} e⋅cm.

=== SUSY CP problem ===
Supersymmetric extensions to the Standard Model, such as the Minimal Supersymmetric Standard Model, generally lead to a large CP-violation. Typical predictions for the neutron EDM arising from the theory range between 10^{−25} e⋅cm and 10^{−28} e⋅cm. As in the case of the strong interaction, the limit on the neutron EDM is already constraining the CP violating phases. The fine-tuning is, however, not as severe yet.

=== Experimental technique ===
In order to extract the neutron EDM, one measures the Larmor precession of the neutron spin in the presence of parallel and antiparallel magnetic and electric fields. The precession frequency for each of the two cases is given by

$$h\nu = 2\mu_\text{n} B \pm 2d_\text{n} E$$,

the addition or subtraction of the frequencies stemming from the precession of the magnetic moment around the magnetic field and the precession of the electric dipole moment around the electric field. From the difference of those two frequencies one readily obtains a measure of the neutron EDM:

$$d_\text{n} = \frac{h\,\Delta\nu}{4E}$$

The biggest challenge of the experiment (and at the same time the source of the biggest systematic false effects) is to ensure that the magnetic field does not change during these two measurements.

=== History ===
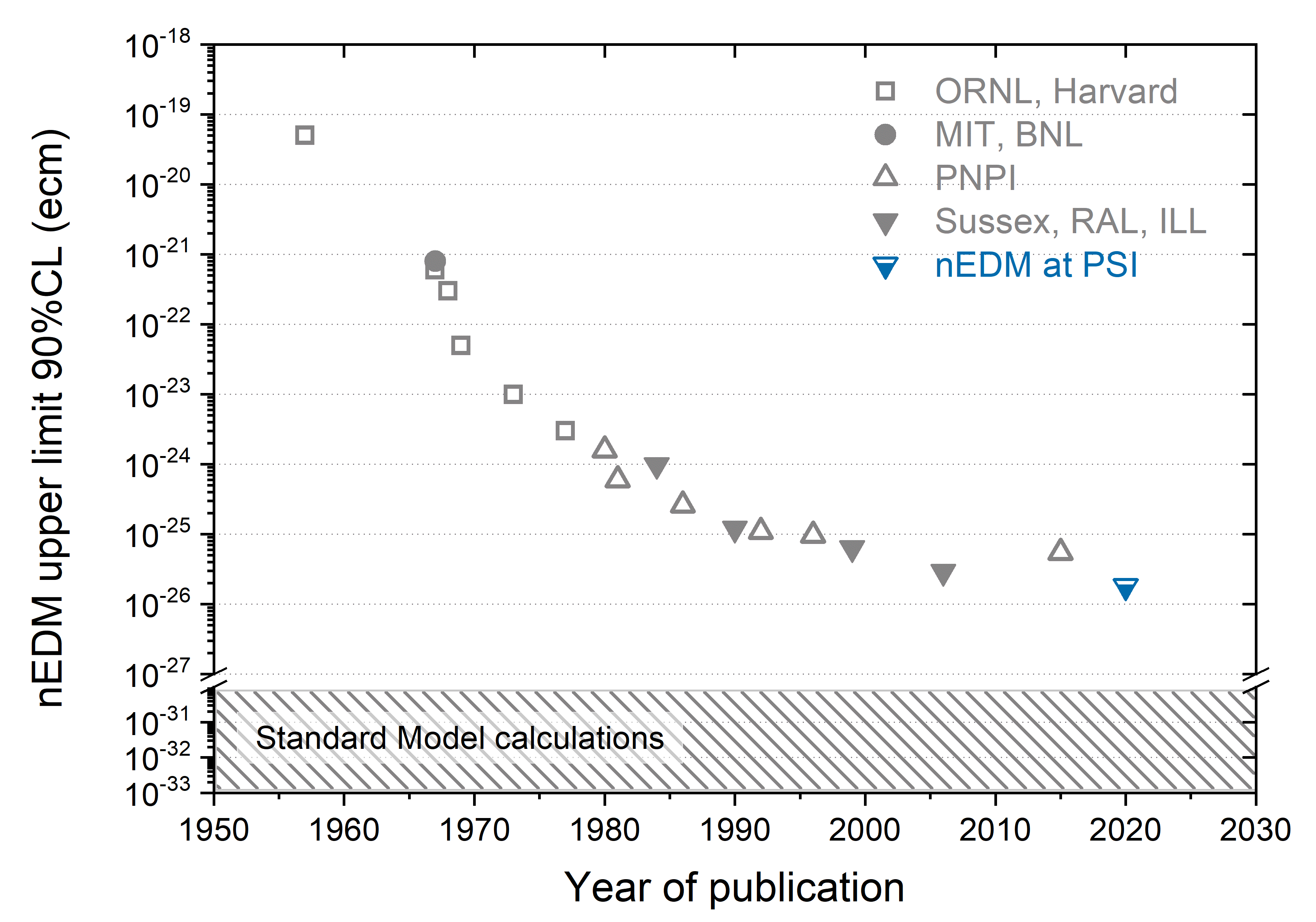
The history of neutron EDM limits including the latest best result by the nEDM collaboration at PSI. The prediction stemming from the Standard Model is also indicated.

The first experiments searching for the neutron EDM used thermal neutron beams. It started with the experiment by James Smith, Purcell, and Ramsey in 1951 (published in 1957) at ORNL's Graphite Reactor, obtaining a limit of |d_{n}| < 5×10^{−20} e⋅cm . Beams of neutrons were used until 1977 for nEDM experiments. At this point, systematic effects related to the high velocities of the neutrons in the beam became insurmountable. The final limit obtained with a neutron beam is |d_{n}| < 3×10^{−24} e⋅cm.

Experiments with ultracold neutrons (UCN) then took over. The first was done in 1980 with an experiment at the Leningrad Nuclear Physics Institute (LNPI) obtaining a limit of |d_{n}| < 1.6×10^{−24} e⋅cm . This experiment and especially the experiment starting in 1984 at the Institut Laue-Langevin (ILL) pushed the limit down by another two orders of magnitude yielding the best upper limit in 2006, and later revised in 2015.

During these 70 years of experiments, six orders of magnitude have been covered, thereby putting stringent constraints on theoretical models.

The latest best limit of |d_{n}| < 1.8×10^{−26} e⋅cm was published in 2020 by the nEDM collaboration at Paul Scherrer Institute (PSI).

== Nuclear EDM ==
The nuclear electric dipole moment (nuclear EDM) $\mathbf d_\text{e}^N$ is an intrinsic property of a nucleus that can be non-zero only if CP violating interactions occur within the atom or the nucleus itself.

CP-violating properties and interactions that can contribute to a nuclear electric dipole moment include the neutron EDM, the proton EDM as well as CP-violating interactions of nucleons with meson or photons. At a more fundamental level, nuclear EDMs can originate from the electroweak sector, a non-zero $\bar{\theta}_\text{QCD}$ or from physical processes that go beyond the Standard Model of particle physics. A time varying nuclear EDM would be evidence for (and give the mass of) axion-like dark matter.

=== Schiff theorem ===
The Schiff theorem provides a complication to searches for Nuclear EDMs. The theorem, first proposed by Leonard I. Schiff in 1963, states that a nuclear EDM will be screened by the nucleus's electrons. This occurs as the electrons arrange themselves so as to cancel an applied external electric field and minimize the electric dipole energy of the nucleus. If the electric charge and dipole distributions of the nucleus are identical (for example if treated as a point dipole and charge) this screening will be complete.

This motivates the use of atoms with mismatches between their nuclear electric charge and dipole distributions. The measurable Schiff moments (S) that survive this screening scale with the nuclear charge $Z$, motivating the selection of heavy atoms. Further, Schiff moments are enhanced by nuclear levels close in energy and of opposite parity (namely those present in an octupole deformed nuclei). The Schiff moment may be derived from a Taylor expansion of the classical electrostatic interaction between an electron and a nuclear charge density.

=== Measurements ===
Experimental searches for subatomic EDMs apply aligned electric field ($\mathbf E$) and magnetic fields ($\mathbf B$) to create the potential:

$$U = - (\mathbf \mu_N \cdot \mathbf B + \mathbf d_\text{e}^N \cdot \mathbf E)$$

where $\mathbf{\mu}_N$ is the nuclear magnetic moment. Measuring the spin precession rate before and after flipping the direction of $\mathbf E$ and subtracting the two corresponding Larmor frequencies leads to a result that is proportional to $\mathbf d_\text{e}^N$.

List of Nuclear EDM Results
| Year | Location | Principal Investigators | Method | Species | Experimental upper limit on |$\mathbf d_\text{e}^N$| [e⋅cm] |
|---|---|---|---|---|---|
| 2016 | Argonne National Laboratory | Zheng-Tian Lu, Roy J. Holt, Peter Mueller, Jaideep T. Singh | Atomic beam | ^{225}Ra | 1.4×10^{−23} |
| 2019 | University of Michigan, Ann Arbor | Timothy E. Chupp, Lars Trahms, Peter Fierlinger | Vapor Cell | ^{129}Xe | 1.4×10^{−27} |

List of Schiff Moments
| Year | Location | Principal Investigators | Method | Species | Experimental upper limit on S [e⋅fm^{3}] |
|---|---|---|---|---|---|
| 1989 | Yale University | Edward Hinds | Molecular beam | TlF | 3.0×10^{−10} |
| 2016 | University of Washington, Seattle | Blayne Heckel | Vapor Cell | ^{199}Hg | 3.1×10^{−13} |
| 2022 | University of Science and Technology of China | Zheng-Tian Lu, Tian Xia | Magneto-optical trap | ^{171}Yb | 17×10^{−8} |
| 2026 | University of Toronto | Amar Vutha | Crystals | ^{153}Eu:Y_{2}SiO_{5} | 1.7×10^{−8} |

== Electron EDM ==
The electron electric dipole moment d_{e} is an intrinsic property of an electron such that the potential energy is linearly related to the strength of the electric field:

$$U = - \mathbf d_{\rm e} \cdot \mathbf E.$$

The electron's electric dipole moment (EDM) must be collinear with the direction of the electron's magnetic moment (spin). Within the Standard Model, such a dipole is predicted to be non-zero but very small, at most 10^{−38} e⋅cm, where e stands for the elementary charge. The discovery of a substantially larger electron electric dipole moment would imply a violation of both parity invariance and time reversal invariance.

=== Implications for Standard Model and extensions ===
In the Standard Model, the electron EDM arises from the CP-violating components of the CKM matrix. The moment is very small because the CP violation involves quarks, not electrons directly, so it can only arise by quantum processes where virtual quarks are created, interact with the electron, and then are annihilated. (Note: More precisely, a non-zero EDM does not arise until the level of four-loop Feynman diagrams and higher.)

If neutrinos are Majorana particles, a larger EDM (around 10^{−33} e⋅cm) is possible in the Standard Model.

Many extensions to the Standard Model have been proposed in the past two decades. These extensions generally predict larger values for the electron EDM. For instance, the various technicolor models predict |d_{e}| that ranges from 10^{−27} to 10^{−29} e⋅cm. Some supersymmetric models predict that |d_{e}| > 10^{−26} e⋅cm but some other parameter choices or other supersymmetric models lead to smaller predicted values. The present experimental limit therefore eliminates some of these technicolor/supersymmetric theories, but not all. Further improvements, or a positive result, would place further limits on which theory takes precedence.

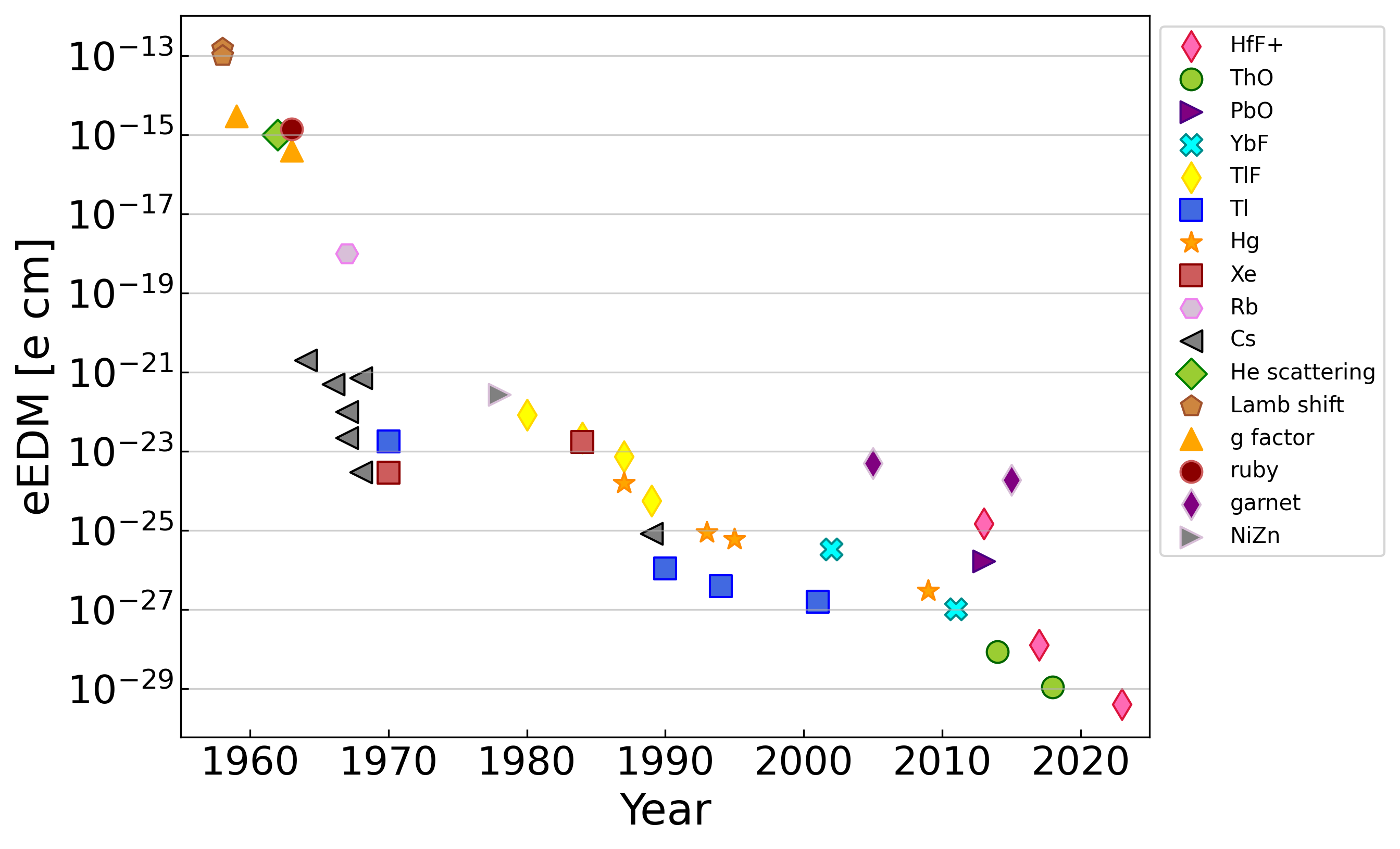
Measurements of the electron's electric dipole moment.

=== Formal definition ===
As the electron has a net charge, the definition of its electric dipole moment is ambiguous in that

$$\mathbf  d_{\rm e} = \int ({\mathbf r} - {\mathbf r}_0) \rho({\mathbf r}) d^3 {\mathbf r}$$

depends on the point ${\mathbf r}_0$ about which the moment of the charge distribution $\rho({\mathbf r})$ is taken. If we were to choose ${\mathbf r}_0$ to be the center of charge, then $\mathbf d_{\rm e}$ would be identically zero. A more interesting choice would be to take ${\mathbf r}_0$ as the electron's center of mass evaluated in the frame in which the electron is at rest.

Classical notions such as the center of charge and mass are, however, hard to make precise for a quantum elementary particle. In practice the definition used by experimentalists comes from the form factors $F_i(q^2)$ appearing in the matrix element

$$\langle p_f|j^\mu|p_i \rangle= \bar u(p_f) \left\{ F_1(q^2) \gamma^\mu +\frac{i \sigma^{\mu\nu}}{2m_{\rm e}}q_\nu F_2(q^2)+i\epsilon^{\mu\nu\rho\sigma}\sigma_{\rho\sigma}q_\nu F_3(q^2)+\frac 1{2m_{\rm e}}\left(q^\mu-\frac{q^2}{2m_\text{e}} \gamma^\mu \right)\gamma_5 F_4(q^2)  \right\}  u(p_i)$$

of the electromagnetic current operator between two on-shell states with Lorentz invariant phase space normalization in which

$$\langle p_f \vert p_i \rangle= 2E (2\pi)^3 \delta^3({\bf p}_f-{\bf p_i}).$$

Here $u(p_i)$ and $\bar u(p_f)$ are 4-spinor solutions of the Dirac equation normalized so that $\bar u u=2m_\text{e}$, and $q^\mu=p^\mu_f-p^\mu_i$ is the momentum transfer from the current to the electron. The $q^2=0$ form factor $F_1(0) = Q$ is the electron's charge, $\mu = \tfrac{F_1(0)\ +\ F_2(0)}{2m_{\rm e}}$ is its static magnetic dipole moment, and $\tfrac{-F_3(0)}{2m_{\rm e}}$ provides the formal definition of the electron's electric dipole moment. The remaining form factor $F_4(q^2)$ would, if nonzero, be the anapole moment.

=== Experimental measurements ===
Electron EDMs are usually not measured on free electrons, but instead on bound, unpaired valence electrons inside atoms and molecules. In these, one can observe the effect of $U = - \mathbf d_{\rm e} \cdot \mathbf E$ as a slight shift of spectral lines. The sensitivity to $\mathbf d_{\rm e}$ scales approximately with the nuclear charge cubed. For this reason, electron EDM searches almost always are conducted on systems involving heavy elements.

To date, no experiment has found a non-zero electron EDM. As of 2020 the Particle Data Group publishes its value as |d_{e}| < 0.11×10^{−28} e⋅cm.

List of Electron EDM Results
| Year | Location | Principal Investigators | Method | Species | Experimental upper limit on |d_{e}| [e⋅cm] |
|---|---|---|---|---|---|
| 1958 | Cornell University | Edwin E. Salpeter | Lamb shift | H | 1.54×10^{−13} |
| 1963 | Harvard University | Nicolaas Bloembergen | Crystal | Cr:Al_{2}O_{3} | 1.4×10^{−15} |
| 2002 | University of California, Berkeley | Eugene Commins, David DeMille | Atomic beam | Tl | 1.6×10^{−27} |
| 2011 | Imperial College London | Edward Hinds, Ben Sauer | Molecular beam | YbF | 1.1×10^{−27} |
| 2013 | Yale University | David DeMille | Vapor Cell | PbO | 1.7×10^{−26} |
| 2014 | Harvard-Yale; ACME I | David DeMille, John Doyle, Gerald Gabrielse | Molecular beam | ThO | 8.7×10^{−29} |
| 2017 | JILA | Eric Cornell, Jun Ye | Ion trap | HfF+ | 1.3×10^{−28} |
| 2018 | Harvard-Yale; ACME II | David DeMille, John Doyle, Gerald Gabrielse | Molecular beam | ThO | 1.1×10^{−29} |
| 2022 | JILA | Eric Cornell, Jun Ye | Ion trap | HfF+ | 4.1×10^{−30} |

The ACME collaboration is, as of 2020, developing a further version of the ACME experiment series. The latest experiment is called Advanced ACME or ACME III and it aims to improve the limit on electron EDM by one to two orders of magnitude.

== See also ==
- Electron magnetic moment
- Anomalous electric dipole moment
- Anomalous magnetic dipole moment
- Electric dipole spin resonance
- Parity (physics) § Parity violation
- CP violation
- Charge conjugation
- T-symmetry
- Axion – a hypothetical particle proposed to explain the strong force's unexpected preservation of CP symmetry
- Electric dipole spin resonance
- Nucleon magnetic moment – the corresponding magnetic property, which has been measured
