= Saffman =

Saffman is a surname. Notable people with the surname include:

- Mark Saffman (fl. 1981), English-born American physicist
- Philip Saffman (1931–2008), English-born American mathematician
