= Chupp (surname) =

Chupp is a surname. Notable people with the surname include:

- Sam Chupp (fl. 1995–2003), American tabletop game designer
- Timothy E. Chupp (fl. 1983), American scientist and educator

== See also ==
- Chipp, another surname
- Chopp, another surname
