= Eric J. Heller =

American physicist, theoretical chemist and professor

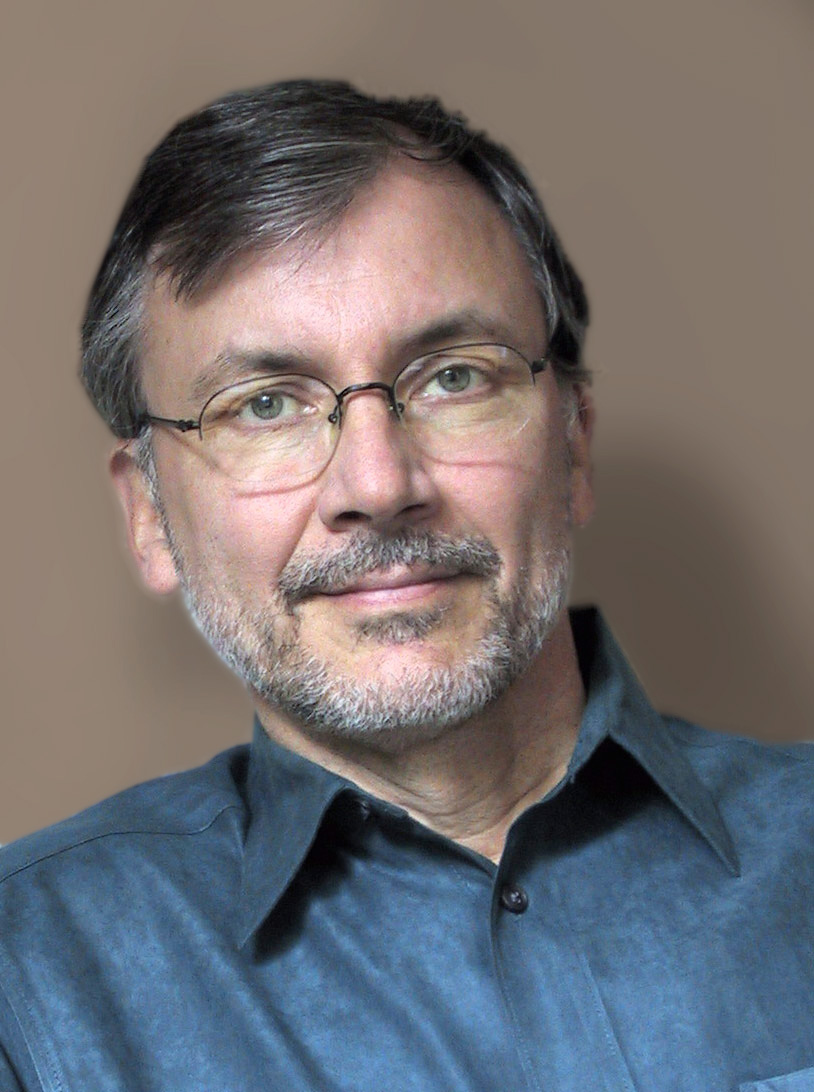
- Eric Heller (2005)
- Born: January 10, 1946 (age 80)
- Education: Harvard University
- Known for: Quantum scars
- Awards: National Academy of Sciences (2006), American Chemical Society Award in Theoretical Chemistry (2005).
- Scientific career
- Fields: Theoretical Chemistry; Physics
- Workplaces: Harvard, UCLA, Los Alamos National Laboratory, University of Washington
- Doctoral advisor: William P. Reinhardt

Eric Johnson "Rick" Heller (born January 10, 1946) is the Abbott and James Lawrence Professor of Chemistry and Professor of Physics at Harvard University. Heller is known for his work on time-dependent quantum mechanics, and also for producing digital art based on the results of his numerical calculations.

== Early life and education ==
Heller's father was the economist Walter Heller, architect of the first tax cut motivated by fiscal policy, under John F Kennedy.

Heller received his BS from the University of Minnesota in 1968, and his PhD in Chemical Physics in 1973 from Harvard University, where he worked with William Reinhardt. Heller was a postdoc at the University of Chicago with Stuart Rice, after which he joined the faculty at the University of California, Los Angeles.

== Career ==
Heller was a member of the Chemistry faculty at UCLA from 1976 to 1982. In 1981, Heller took a sabbatical at Los Alamos National Laboratory and then stayed on as a staff scientist until 1984 when he accepted a faculty position in Chemistry at the University of Washington. In 1993, Heller returned to Harvard as Professor of Physics and director of the Institute for Theoretical Atomic and Molecular Physics (ITAMP) (1993–1998). In 1998, Heller stepped down as ITAMP director to assume a joint appointment to the Harvard University Chemistry department. His present position is Abbott and James Lawrence Professor of Chemistry and Professor of Physics at Harvard University.

Heller is an elected member of the International Academy of Quantum Molecular Science, the National Academy of Sciences, the American Academy of Arts and Sciences, and the American Association for the Advancement of Science, and the American Philosophical Society. Heller has received the American Chemical Society Award in Theoretical Chemistry (2005), the Astor Fellowship at Oxford (2005) and the Joseph O. Hirschfelder Prize (2003). Heller has been a Sloan Fellow, a Humboldt Fellow, a fellow of the American Physical Society, and a Guggenheim Fellow, and is the coauthor of over 280 publications.

=== Research ===
Heller pioneered a time-dependent wavepacket picture of quantum mechanics, which allowed the excited-state dynamics of large quantum mechanical systems to be understood without calculating eigenstates. Heller's work laid the foundations for a theoretical understanding of femtochemistry. He and postdoc Soo-ying Lee developed the time-dependent approach to resonance Raman spectroscopy. Heller has also made contributions to methodology, suggesting the technique called "frozen Gaussians"—today the most widely used semiclassical initial value representation (IVR) method of wavepacket propagation.

In physics, Heller is known for his work on quantum chaos, particularly on scar theory. Heller's more recent work has focused on the study of two dimensional electron gases, quantum mirages in quantum corrals, scattering theory, few-body quantum mechanics, semiclassical methods, and freak waves in the ocean. Many (though not all) of these studies make use of the time-dependent quantum mechanics ideas from his earlier work.

== Publications ==
Heller published a book called Why You Hear What You Hear on acoustics and psychoacoustics (Princeton, 2013). Ostensibly a textbook, it contains many new perspectives on acoustics, including of musical instruments and voice. The psychoacoustics of pitch perception forms the longest chapter.

In June, 2018 a second book authored by Heller was published by Princeton University Press. Called The Semiclassical Way (to dynamics and spectroscopy), it is about quantum mechanics and classical mechanics and exploiting the computationally useful and helpfully intuitive connections between them. It shares a foundation with Why You Hear What You Hear in that both books are about understanding wave phenomena.

Heller is mentioned in the Nebula Award winning novel The Quantum Rose by Catherine Asaro, a science fiction novel based in part on Heller's theories. Asaro, who was a student of Heller's, dedicated the book to him and her other two mentors, Alex Dalgarno and Kate Kirby.
