= Gerald Gabrielse =

American physicist

- Education: Calvin College (B.S.); University of Chicago (Ph.D.)
- Known for: antimatter, precision measurement
- Awards: Davisson–Germer Prize (2002); George Ledlie Prize (2004); Inducted into the National Academy of Sciences (2007); Julius Edgar Lilienfeld Prize (2011); Trotter Prize (2014); Norman F. Ramsey Prize (2024)
- Scientific career
- Fields: Physics
- Workplaces: University of Washington; Harvard University; Northwestern University
- Doctoral advisor: Henry Gordon Berry
- Other academic advisors: Hans Dehmelt (postdoc)
- Doctoral students: Tanya Zelevinsky
- Website: cfp.physics.northwestern.edu/gabrielse-group/gabrielse-home.html

Gerald Gabrielse is an American physicist. He is the Board of Trustees Professor of Physics and director of the Center for Fundamental Physics at Northwestern University, and Emeritus George Vasmer Leverett Professor of Physics at Harvard University. He is primarily known for his experiments trapping and investigating antimatter, measuring the electron g-factor, and measuring the electron electric dipole moment. He has been described as "a leader in super-precise measurements of fundamental particles and the study of anti-matter."

== Career ==
Gabrielse attended Trinity Christian College and then Calvin College, graduating with a B.S. (honors) in 1973. He then completed his M.S. (1975) and Ph.D. (1980) in physics from the University of Chicago under Henry Gordon Berry. Gabrielse became a postdoc at the University of Washington in Seattle in 1978 under Hans Dehmelt, and joined the faculty in 1985. He became professor of physics at Harvard University in 1987, and the chair of Harvard's physics department in 2000.

In 2018, Gabrielse moved to Northwestern University, becoming the director of the newly created Center for Fundamental Physics at Low Energy. The center is the first of its kind to be dedicated to small-scale, tabletop fundamental physics experiments.

== Research ==
=== Antimatter research ===
Gabrielse was a pioneer in the field of low energy antiproton and antihydrogen physics by proposing the trapping of antiprotons from a storage ring, cooling them in collisions with trapped electrons, and the use of these to form low energy antihydrogen atoms. He led the TRAP team that realized the first antiproton trapping, the first electron cooling of trapped antiprotons, and the accumulation of antiprotons in a 4 Kelvin apparatus. The demonstrations and methods made possible an effort that grew to involve 4 international collaborations of physicists working at CERN's Antiproton Decelerator. In 1999, Gabrielse's TRAP team made the most precise test of the Standard Model's fundamental CPT theorem by comparing the charge-to-mass ratio of a single trapped antiproton with that of a proton to a precision of 9 parts in 10^{11}. The precision of the resulting confirmation of the Standard Model prediction exceeded that of earlier comparisons by nearly a factor of 10^{6}.

Gabrielse now leads the ATRAP team at CERN, one of the two teams that first produced slow antihydrogen atoms and suspended them in a magnetic trap. Both TRAP and ATRAP teams used trapped antiprotons within a nested Penning trap device to produce antihydrogen atoms slow enough to be trapped in a magnetic trap. The team made the first one-particle comparison of the magnetic moments of a single proton and a single antiproton. Their comparison, to a precision of 5 parts per million, was 680 times more precision than previous measurements.

=== Precision measurement ===
Gabrielse's group has been known to perform the most precise measurements of the electron magnetic moment by using a single trapped electron. These measurements are the most precise measurements of any single particle and are among the most stringent tests of the Standard Model. Using the theory of quantum electrodynamics, a measurement of the electron magnetic moment can also be interpreted as a measurement of the fine structure constant. In 2006, the group made its first measurement with an uncertainty of 0.76 parts per trillion, which was 15 times more precise than a measurement that had stood for about 20 years. This measurement was improved two years later by a factor of 2. In 2023, the team improved upon the 2008 uncertainty by another factor of 2.

In 2014, Gabrielse, as part of the ACME collaboration with John Doyle at Harvard and David DeMille at Yale, measured the electron electric dipole moment to over an order of magnitude over the previous measurement using a beam of thorium monoxide, a result which had implications for the viability of supersymmetry. In 2018, the ACME collaboration improved upon this upper limit by another order of magnitude.

=== Other research contributions ===
Gabrielse was also one of the discoverers of the Brown-Gabrielse invariance theorem, relating the free space cyclotron frequency to the measureable eigenfrequencies of an imperfect Penning trap. The theorem's applications include precise measurements of magnetic moments and precise mass spectrometry. It also makes sideband mass spectrometry possible, a standard tool of nuclear physics.

Gabrielse has also invented a self-shielding superconducting solenoid that uses flux conservation and a carefully chosen geometry of coupled coils to cancel strong field fluctuations due to external sources. The device was responsible for the success of the precise comparison of antiproton and proton, and also enables magnetic resonance imaging (MRI) systems to locate changing magnetic fields from external sources, such as elevators.

== Religious views ==
Gabrielse identifies himself as a scientist who is Reformed Christian. In an interview, he said:

I do not believe that science and the Bible are in conflict. However, it is possible to misunderstand the Bible and to misunderstand science. It is important to figure out what of each might be misunderstood.

He has also delivered lectures on the relation between science and religion. In 2006 Gabrielse delivered a lecture titled "God of Antimatter" in the Faraday Institute for Science and Religion in Emmanuel College, Cambridge, discussing his research into antimatter as well as his personal experience with Christianity. He was awarded the Trotter Prize in 2013.

== Trivia ==
- On an episode of Late Night with Conan O'Brien that aired on February 21, 2007, Jim Carrey and Conan O'Brien humorously discussed content from a paper entitled, "Stochastic Phase-Switching of a Parametrically-Driven Electron in a Penning Trap". Gerald Gabrielse said that it was 'perhaps the most obscure paper I've ever written'.
- Working at CERN, Gabrielse trapped the first antiprotons in 1986. Dan Brown's subsequent novel Angels & Demons, and the movie made from it, use antimatter trapped at CERN as an important plot point.

== Awards ==
- Fellow of the American Physical Society (1992)
- Distinguished Alumnus Award, Trinity College (1999)
- Levenson Prize for Excellence in the Education of Undergraduates, Harvard University (2000)
- Davisson–Germer Prize of the American Physical Society (2002)
- George Ledlie Prize, Harvard University (2004)
- Humboldt Research Award, Germany (2005)
- Distinguished Alumni Award, Calvin College (2006)
- Inducted into the National Academy of Sciences (2007)
- Källén Lecturer, Lund, Sweden (2007)
- William H. Zachariasen Lecturer at the University of Chicago (2007-2008)
- Poincaré Lecturer, Paris (2007)
- Premio Caterina Tomassoni and Felice Pietro Chisesi Prize, Italy (2008)
- Julius Edgar Lilienfeld Prize of the American Physical Society (2011)
- Trotter Prize, Texas A&M University (2013)
- Norman F. Ramsey Prize in Atomic, Molecular and Optical Physics, and in Precision Tests of Fundamental Laws and Symmetries (2024)
