= I. I. Rabi Prize =

American award for atomic, molecular, and optical physics

- Awarded for: Outstanding research in atomic, molecular, and optical physics
- Country: United States
- Presented by: American Physical Society
- Reward: $10,000
- First award: 1991
- Website: www.aps.org/funding-recognition/prize/rabi

The I. I. Rabi Prize in Atomic, Molecular, and Optical Physics is given by the American Physical Society to recognize outstanding work by mid-career researchers in the field of atomic, molecular, and optical physics. The award was endowed in 1989 in honor of the physicist I. I. Rabi and has been awarded biannually since 1991.

The prize citation reads:

"To recognize and encourage outstanding research in Atomic, Molecular and Optical Physics by investigators who have held a Ph.D. for no more than 10 years prior to the nomination deadline. The prize consists of $10,000 and a certificate citing the contributions made by the recipient. An allowance will be provided for travel expenses of the recipient to the Society meeting at which the prize is presented. It is awarded in odd-numbered years."

== Recipients ==
=== I. I. Rabi Prize Laureates ===
Year	Laureate(s)	Citation
1991	Chris H. Greene	For his many contributions to atomic and molecular theory including studies of resonance vibronic processes, multiple electron excitations, photo-absorption in external fields, and threshold effects of long range forces.
1993	Timothy E. Chupp	For his contributions to the development of high density polarized noble gases by spin exchange with optically pumped alkali atoms and in particular for his leadership and use of polarized 3He as a target for fundamental experiments in nuclear physics.
1995	Randall G. Hulet	For his contributions to a broad range of important problems in atomic and optical physics including cavity quantum electrodynamics, quantum jumps, ion storage, and laser cooling of atoms.
1997	Eric Allin Cornell and Wolfgang Ketterle	For achieving Bose-Einstein condensation of an atomic gas and for creating techniques for studying the Bose condensate.
1999	Mark G. Raizen	For his pioneering advances in the experimental study of atom optics and insightful connections to chaotic dynamics, condensed matter physics, and dissipative quantum systems.
2001	Christopher Monroe	For his pivotal experiments that implemented quantum logic using trapped atomic ions and for his studies of coherence and decoherence in entangled quantum systems.
2003	Mark A. Kasevich	For developing atom interferometer inertial sensors with unprecedented precision and pioneering studies of Bose-Einstein condensates.
2005	Deborah Jin	
2007	Jun Ye	For advances in precision measurement, including techniques for stabilizing and measuring optical frequencies, controlling the phase of femtosecond laser pulses, and measuring molecular transitions.
2009	Mikhail Lukin	For pioneering theoretical and experimental work at the interface between quantum optics, quantum information processing, and the quantum many body problem.
2011	Cheng Chin	For pioneering work in strongly interacting Fermi gas and few body physics including the discovery of the Efimov effect.
2013	Markus Greiner	For seminal contributions to the field of ultracold atoms, including the observation of the superfluid-to-Mott-insulator transition and the development of imaging techniques with single-atom resolution.
2015	Ian Spielman	For the development of quantum simulations using ultra-cold atoms, creation of synthetic electromagnetic fields, and demonstration of synthetic spin-orbit coupling.
2017	Martin Zwierlein	For seminal studies of ultracold Fermi gases, including precision measurements of the equation of state and the observation of superfluidity.
2019	Kang-Kuen Ni	For seminal work on ultracold molecules, including contributions to understanding chemical reactions in the quantum regime and deterministic creation of individual molecules with optical tweezers.
2021	Monika Schleier-Smith	For seminal work in quantum optics and discoveries at the intersection of AMO, condensed matter, and quantum information.
2023	Adam M. Kaufman	For seminal developments in optical tweezer arrays and clocks based on alkaline earth atoms.
2025	Norman Ying Yao	For pioneering contributions to broad areas of atomic, molecular, and optical physics, including quantum information, metrology, and many-body physics.

== See also ==
- List of physics awards
- Arthur L. Schawlow Prize in Laser Science
- Norman F. Ramsey Prize in Atomic, Molecular and Optical Physics, and in Precision Tests of Fundamental Laws and Symmetries
