= Olga Kocharovskaya =

American physicist

- Ольга Анатольевна Кочаровская
- Education: N. I. Lobachevsky State University of Nizhny Novgorod
- Awards: Willis E. Lamb Award for Laser Science and Quantum Optics, Sigma Xi Distinguished Scientist Award, Presidential Award to Outstanding Young Doctor of Sciences of the Russian Federation, 2023 APS Ramsey Prize, 2024 Herbert Walther Award
- Scientific career
- Fields: Quantum optics, laser physics, optics, photonics, Attosecond physics
- Workplaces: Texas A&M University, Russian Academy of Sciences
- Thesis: (1986)

Olga Anatolevna Kocharovskaya (Russian: Ольга Анатольевна Кочаровская) is a distinguished professor of physics at Texas A&M University, known for her contributions to laser physics, quantum optics and gamma ray modulation.

== Education ==
Kocharovskaya earned a doctorate in 1986 from N. I. Lobachevsky State University of Nizhny Novgorod. Her research at that time was the first to study electromagnetically induced transparency.

== Research and career ==
Kocharovskaya began her postdoctoral research at the Institute of Applied Physics Russian Academy of Sciences in 1986, where she became a senior scientist in 1992 and group leader in 1996. From 1990 to 1996, she was also a visiting research scientist at the Université libre de Bruxelles. She completed a habilitation thesis titled "Lasers without population inversion" in 1996, awarded by the Commission of the Russian Federation. In 1998, she joined Texas A&M University as an associate professor, and became a distinguished professor in 2006. Her theses have been cited in over 6000 works.

== Awards and honours ==
Kocharovskaya received the Outstanding Young Professor of the Russian Federation Award of the Russian Academy of Science in 1996, and was one of three inaugural winners of the Willis E. Lamb Award for Laser Science and Quantum Optics in 1998, sponsored by the annual Physics of Quantum Electronics conference. She has also been a recipient of the University Distinguished Professor Award (2011) and the Distinguished Scientist Award from Sigma Xi, the Scientific Research Society at Texas A&M University (2012).

She received the American Physical Society Norman F. Ramsey Prize in Atomic, Molecular and Optical Physics, and in Precision Tests of Fundamental Laws and Symmetries (2023) and the Herbert Walther Award (2024). She has been a fellow of the Optical Society since 1997, and of the APS since 2005.
