= Chopp =

Chopp is a surname. Notable people with the surname include:

- Frank Chopp (1953–2025), American politician
- Rebecca Chopp (born 1952), American academic administrator and professor

== See also ==
- Chipp, another surname
- Chupp (surname), another surname
- Chopp, Brazilian draught beer
