= Ana Maria Rey =

Colombian physicist (born c. 1976)

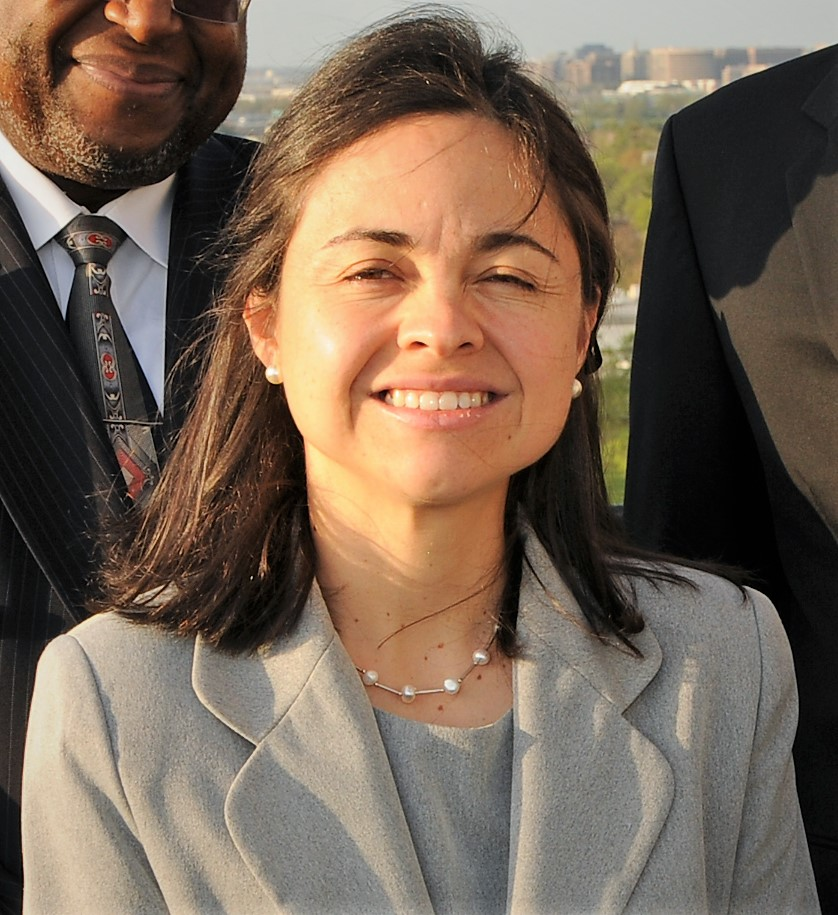
- Rey in 2014
- Born: 1970 (age 55–56); Bogotá, Colombia
- Education: Universidad de los Andes, University of Maryland
- Children: 1
- Awards: MacArthur Fellowship, Maria Goeppert-Mayer Award, Hispanic Engineer National Achievement Award, Blavatnik Award for Young Scientists
- Scientific career
- Workplaces: University of Colorado Boulder, National Institute of Standards and Technology
- Thesis: Ultracold bosonic atoms loaded in optical lattices (2004)
- Doctoral advisor: Charles Clark
- Website: https://jila.colorado.edu/arey

Ana Maria Rey Ayala is a Colombian theoretical physicist and professor at University of Colorado Boulder. She is also a JILA fellow, a fellow at National Institute of Standards and Technology, and a fellow of the American Physical Society. Rey was the first Hispanic woman to win the Blavatnik Awards for Young Scientists in 2019. In 2023, she was elected to the National Academy of Sciences. She is currently the chair of DAMOP, the American Physical Society's division in Atomic, Molecular and Optical Physics (AMO).

== Education ==
Rey earned a bachelor's degree in physics at Universidad de los Andes in Bogotá in 1999 with a magna cum laude distinction. She got her Ph.D. in physics at University of Maryland in 2004. She was a postdoctoral researcher at the National Institute of Standards and Technology from 2004 to 2005 in the group of Charles W. Clark. She went on to work as a postdoctoral fellow at the Institute of Theoretical Atomic, Molecular and Optical Physics (ITAMP) at Harvard University from 2005 to 2008.

== Research and career ==
After her postdoctoral position at ITAMP, she joined the University of Colorado Boulder Physics Department as an assistant research professor and JILA as an associate fellow in 2008. She was promoted to JILA Fellow in 2012 and shifted her position in the Department of Physics to adjoint professor in 2017.

Rey is a theoretical quantum physicist who studies new techniques for controlling quantum systems and their applications ranging from quantum simulations and quantum information to time and frequency standards. Her research is often directly applicable to state-of-the-art experiments, particularly to atomic clocks, quantum computing, and precision measurements. Her contribution to the understanding of out-of-equilibrium quantum phenomena have led to pioneer measurements of quantum information scrambling, and the synthesis of magnetic and topological quantum materials. Her publications have been cited more than 11,000 times as of 2020.

Rey is the principal investigator for the Rey Theory Group, which focuses on orbital quantum magnetism, quantum metrology, topological quantum matter, open quantum systems, and quantum state engineering.

=== Awards and honours ===
- 2013 MacArthur Fellowship
- 2013 Presidential Early Career Award for Scientists and Engineers
- 2013 "Great Minds in STEM" Most Promising Scientist Award
- 2014 Early Career National Hispanic Scientist of the Year
- 2014 Maria Goeppert-Mayer Award of the American Physical Society.
- 2014 Fellow of the American Physical Society
- 2019 Blavatnik Awards for Young Scientists. Rey was the first Hispanic woman to win this award.
- 2023 Elected Member of the National Academy of Sciences
- 2023 Vannevar Bush Faculty Fellowship from the Department of Defense
- 2023 Presidential Rank Award. Rey was recognized as a Distinguished Senior Professional (SP) recipient within the Department of Commerce.

== Personal life ==
Growing up in the early 1990s, Rey's childhood was spent around the terrorist conflicts of Colombia's Revolutionary Armed Forces of Colombia, drug cartels, and the state's government. Car bombs were a common method of terrorism where she lived, causing her family's vehicle to be searched for bombs by the police whenever they drove around.

However, despite living in such a dangerous environment, she always strived to gain knowledge. Hence, she would ask her high school physics teacher for more books in order to solve problems. This pattern seemed to continue throughout college, where she would ask professors for more work. By asking for more work, her goal out of this was to become more knowledgeable and grow.

On July 29, 2000, Rey got married. Two days later, she immigrated to the United States.

== Selected publications ==
The most cited publications by Rey to the date are:

- S Trotzky, P Cheinet, S Fölling, M Feld, U Schnorrberger, AM Rey, A. Polkovnikov, E. A. Demler, M. D. Lukin, I. Bloch. Time-resolved observation and control of superexchange interactions with ultracold atoms in optical lattices. (2008) Science 319 (5861), 295–299
- AV Gorshkov, M Hermele, V Gurarie, C Xu, PS Julienne, J Ye, P Zoller. Two-orbital SU (N) magnetism with ultracold alkaline-earth atoms. (2010) Nature physics 6 (4), 289–295
- B Yan, SA Moses, B Gadway, JP Covey, KRA Hazzard, AM Rey, DS Jin. Observation of dipolar spin-exchange interactions with lattice-confined polar molecules. (2013) Nature 501 (7468), 521–525
- JG Bohnet, BC Sawyer, JW Britton, ML Wall, AM Rey, M Foss-Feig. Quantum spin dynamics and entanglement generation with hundreds of trapped ions. (2016) Science 352 (6291), 1297–1301
- M Gärttner, JG Bohnet, A Safavi-Naini, ML Wall, JJ Bollinger, AM Rey. Measuring out-of-time-order correlations and multiple quantum spectra in a trapped-ion quantum magnet. (2017) Nature Physics 13 (8), 781–786
- X Zhang, M Bishof, SL Bromley, CV Kraus, MS Safronova, P Zoller, A. M. Rey, J. Ye. Spectroscopic observation of SU (N)-symmetric interactions in Sr orbital magnetism. (2014) Science 345 (6203), 1467–1473
