= Imidogen =

Inorganic radical with the chemical formula NH

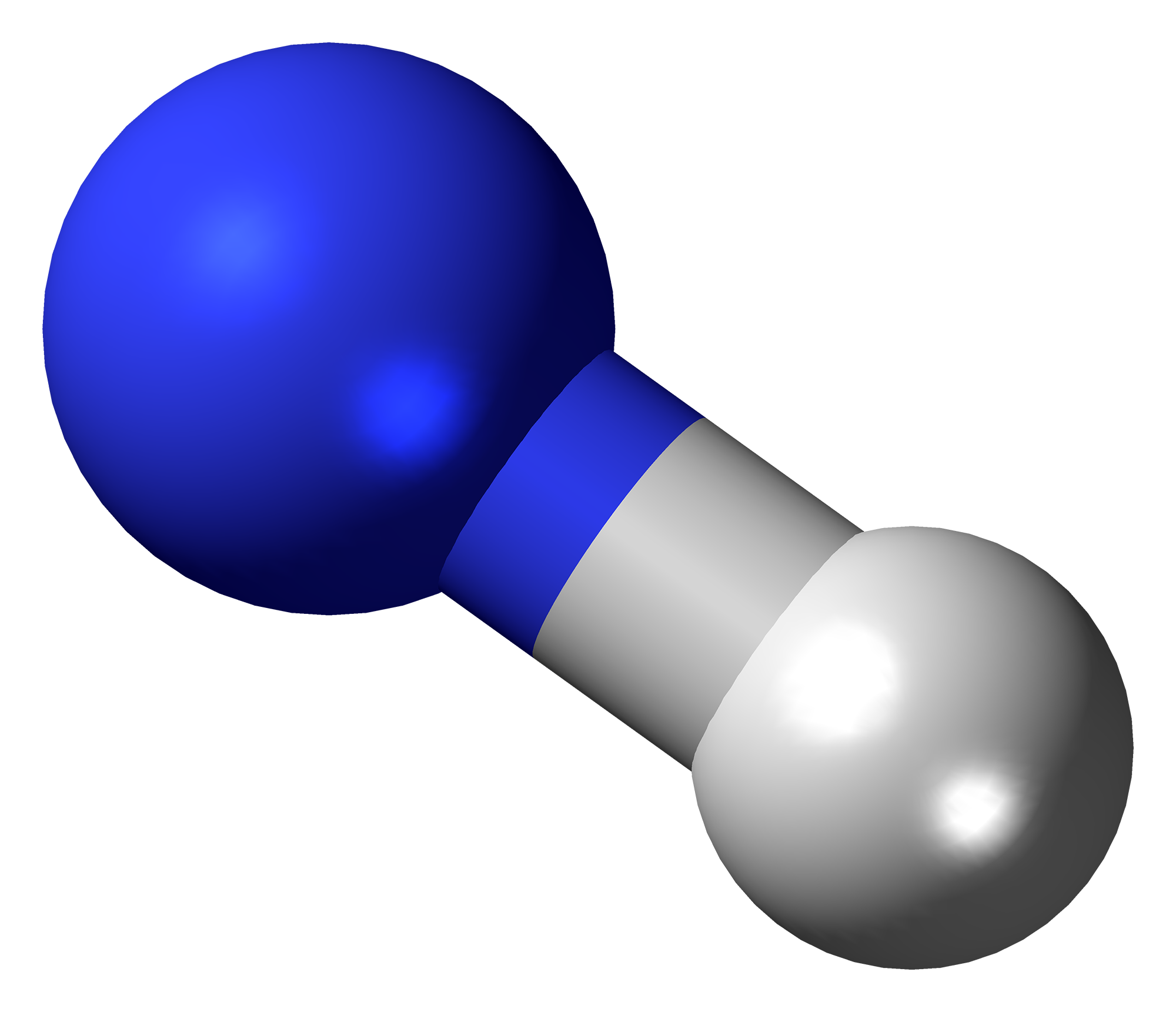

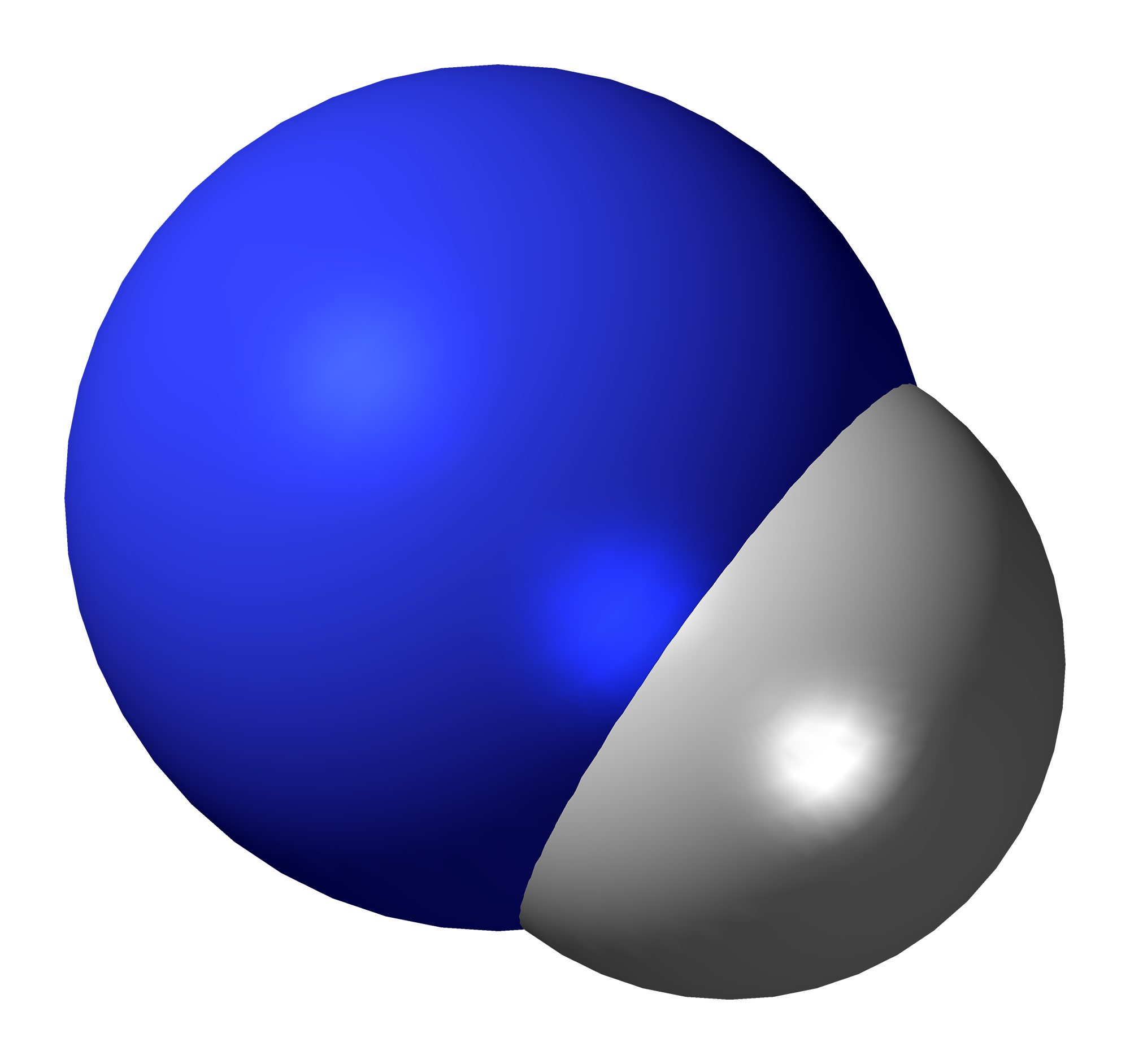

Names
- IUPAC name λ^{1}-Azanylidene
- Other names Aminylene Azanylene; Azanylidene; Imidogen; Nitrene λ^{1}-azane hydridonitrogen

Identifiers
CAS Number	13774-92-0
3D model (JSmol)	Interactive image
ChEBI	CHEBI:29339
ChemSpider	4574105
Gmelin Reference	66
PubChem CID	5460607
CompTox Dashboard (EPA)	DTXSID80420101
- InChI: InChI=1S/HN/h1H Key: PDCKRJPYJMCOFO-UHFFFAOYSA-N
- SMILES: [NH]

Properties
Chemical formula	HN
Molar mass	15.015 g·mol^{−1}
Conjugate acid	Nitrenium ion

Structure
Molecular shape	linear

Thermochemistry
Heat capacity (C)	21.19 J K^{−1} mol^{−1}
Std molar entropy (S^{⦵}_{298})	181.22 kJ K^{−1} mol^{−1}
Std enthalpy of formation (Δ_{f}H^{⦵}_{298})	358.43 kJ mol^{−1}
- Except where otherwise noted, data are given for materials in their standard state (at 25 °C [77 °F], 100 kPa). Infobox references

Imidogen is an inorganic compound with the chemical formula NH. Like other simple radicals, it is highly reactive and consequently short-lived except as a dilute gas. Its behavior depends on its spin multiplicity.

== Production and properties ==
Imidogen can be generated by electrical discharge in an atmosphere of ammonia.

Imidogen has a large rotational splitting and a weak spin–spin interaction, therefore it will be less likely to undergo collision-induced Zeeman transitions. Ground-state imidogen can be magnetically trapped using buffer-gas loading from a molecular beam.

The ground state of imidogen is a triplet, with a singlet excited state only slightly higher in energy.

The first excited state (a^{1}Δ) has a long lifetime as its relaxation to ground state (X^{3}Σ^{−}) is spin-forbidden. Imidogen undergoes collision-induced intersystem crossing.

== Reactivity ==
Ignoring hydrogen atoms, imidogen is isoelectronic with carbene (CH_{2}) and oxygen (O) atoms, and it exhibits comparable reactivity. The first excited state can be detected by laser-induced fluorescence (LIF). LIF methods allow for detection of depletion, production, and chemical products of NH. It reacts with nitric oxide (NO):

NH + NO → N_{2} + OH
NH + NO → N_{2}O + H

The former reaction is more favorable with a ΔH^{0} of −408±2 kJ/mol compared to a ΔH^{0} of −147±2 kJ/mol for the latter reaction.

== Nomenclature ==
The trivial name nitrene is the preferred IUPAC name. The systematic names, λ^{1}-azane and hydridonitrogen, valid IUPAC names, are constructed according to the substitutive and additive nomenclatures, respectively.

In appropriate contexts, imidogen can be viewed as ammonia with two hydrogen atoms removed, and as such, azylidene may be used as a context-specific systematic name, according to substitutive nomenclature. By default, this name pays no regard to the radicality of the imidogen molecule. Although, in even more specific context, it can also name the non-radical state, whereas the diradical state is named azanediyl.

== Astrochemistry ==
Interstellar NH was identified in the diffuse clouds toward ζ Persei and HD 27778 from high-resolution high-signal-to-noise spectra of the NH A^{3}Π→X^{3}Σ (0,0) absorption band near 3358 Å. A temperature of about 30 K (−243 °C) favored an efficient production of CN from NH within the diffuse cloud.

=== Reactions relevant to astrochemistry ===
Chemical reactions
Reaction	Rate constant	Rate/[H_{2}]^{2}
N + H^{−} → NH + e^{−}	1×10^{−9}	3.5×10^{−18}
NH_{2} + O → NH + OH	2.546×10^{−13}	1.4×10^{−13}
NH^{+}_{2} + e^{−} → NH + H	3.976×10^{−7}	2.19×10^{−21}
NH^{+}_{3} + e^{−} → NH + H + H	8.49×10^{−7}	2.89×10^{−19}
NH + N → N_{2} + H	4.98×10^{−11}	4.36×10^{−16}
NH + O → OH + N	1.16×10^{−11}	1.54×10^{−14}
NH + C^{+} → CN^{+} + H	7.8×10^{−10}	4.9×10^{−19}
NH + H^{+}_{3} → NH^{+}_{2} + H_{2}	1.3×10^{−9}	3.18×10^{−19}
NH + H^{+} → NH^{+} + H	2.1×10^{−9}	4.05×10^{−20}

Within diffuse clouds H^{−} + N → NH + e^{−} is a major formation mechanism. Near chemical equilibrium important NH formation mechanisms are recombinations of NH^{+}_{2} and NH^{+}_{3} ions with electrons. Depending on the radiation field in the diffuse cloud, NH_{2} can also contribute.

NH is destroyed in diffuse clouds by photodissociation and photoionization. In dense clouds NH is destroyed by reactions with atomic oxygen and nitrogen. O^{+} and N^{+} form OH and NH in diffuse clouds. NH is involved in creating N_{2}, OH, H, CN^{+}, CH, N, NH^{+}_{2}, NH^{+} for the interstellar medium.

NH has been reported in the diffuse interstellar medium but not in dense molecular clouds. The purpose of detecting NH is often to get a better estimate of the rotational constants and vibrational levels of NH. It is also needed in order to confirm theoretical data which predicts N and NH abundances in stars which produce N and NH and other stars with leftover trace amounts of N and NH. Using current values for rotational constants and vibrations of NH as well as those of OH and CH permit studying the carbon, nitrogen and oxygen abundances without resorting to a full spectrum synthesis with a 3D model atmosphere.

== See also ==
- Diimide (dimer)
- List of interstellar and circumstellar molecules
