= Martin Zwierlein =

German physicist

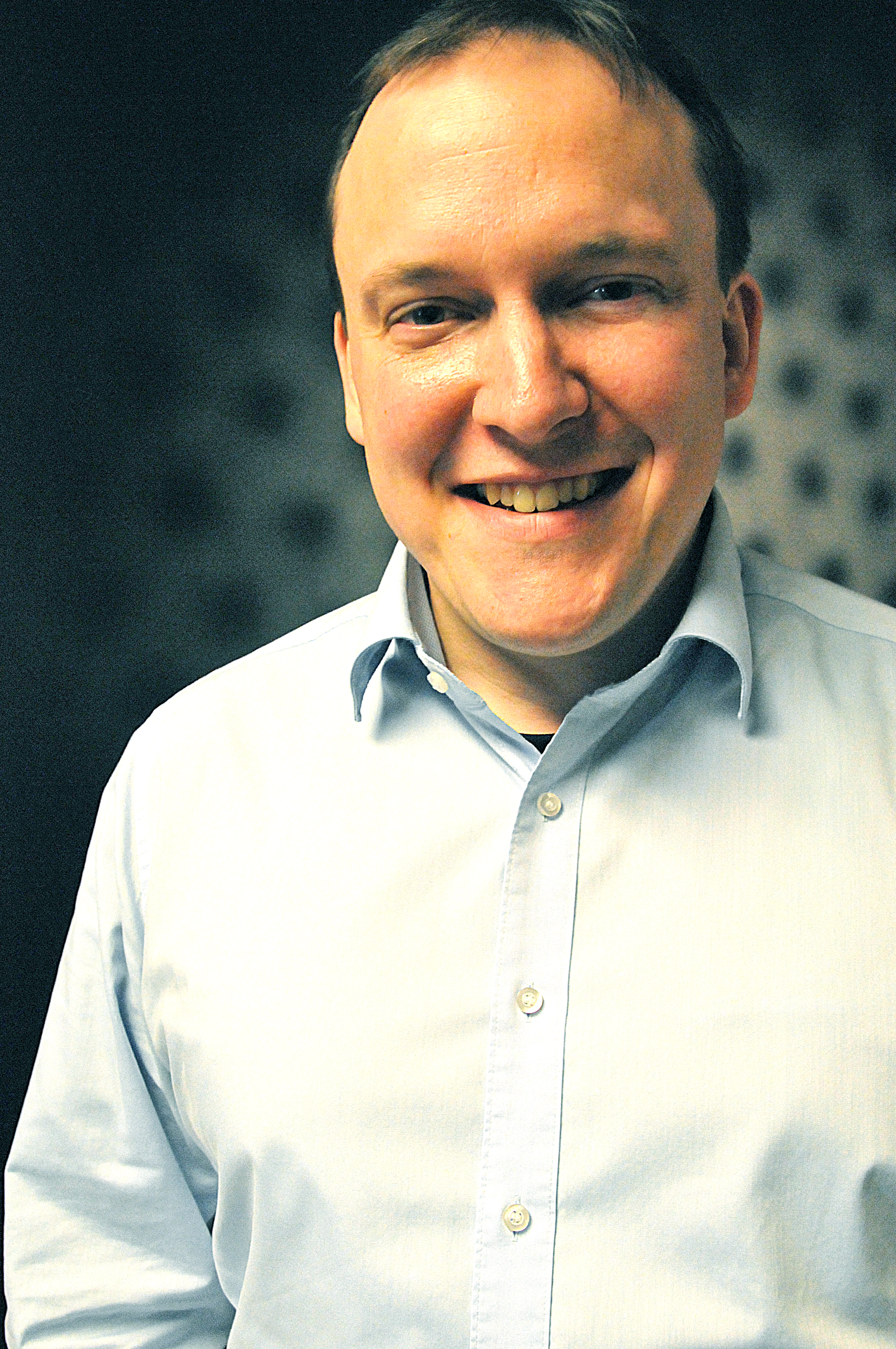
- Education: University of Bonn; École normale supérieure Massachusetts Institute of Technology (PhD)
- Known for: ultracold atoms
- Scientific career
- Fields: Physics; Atomic Physics; Ultracold Atoms
- Thesis: High-temperature superfluidity in an ultracold Fermi gas (2007)
- Doctoral advisor: Wolfgang Ketterle
- Website: web.mit.edu/physics/people/faculty/zwierlein_martin.html

Martin Zwierlein is a German physicist who is a professor of physics at Massachusetts Institute of Technology, Principal Investigator at the Research Laboratory of Electronics, and an elected fellow of the American Physical Society.

== Education and career ==
Zwierlein was educated at the University of Bonn and the École Normale Supérieure. He obtained his Ph.D. at MIT under Wolfgang Ketterle. Afterwards, he was briefly a postdoctoral research associate in the group of Immanuel Bloch at Mainz University.

Zwierlein joined the MIT department of physics in 2007 and was promoted to full professor in 2013.

He is a pioneer in the study of ultracold atomic Fermi gases and molecules.

He was won numerous awards for his work, including the I. I. Rabi Prize of the American Physical Society in 2017, and the TOPTICA BEC Junior Award in 2021
