= Randall G. Hulet =

Randall Hulet
- Born: April 27, 1956
- Education: Stanford University; MIT (Ph.D.)
- Known for: Atomic physics
- Awards: I. I. Rabi Prize (1995); Willis E. Lamb Award (2011); Herbert Walther Prize (2017)
- Scientific career
- Fields: Physics; Atomic Physics; Ultracold Atoms
- Workplaces: Rice University
- Doctoral advisor: Daniel Kleppner
- Website: rcqm.rice.edu/researchers/randy-hulet/

Randall Gardner Hulet (born April 27, 1956, in Walnut Creek, California) is an American physicist.

Hulet studied at Stanford University, earning a bachelor's degree in 1978. He received his doctorate in 1984, at the Massachusetts Institute of Technology under Daniel Kleppner, and then joined the National Institute of Standards and Technology (NIST) in Boulder with David Wineland. In 1987, he became an assistant professor of physics at Rice University, and was promoted to associate professor in 1992, then full professor in 1996. He was appointed Fayez Sarofim Professor of Physics and Astronomy in 2000.

He is a pioneer of experiments with ultracold atoms and Bose-Einstein condensates (BEC). He is known for the first realization of a Bose-Einstein condensate in an atomic gas with attractive interaction, where the formation of the BEC competes with the usual condensation due to the attractive interaction. With enough atoms, an attractively interacting BEC becomes unstable, and Hulet's group was the first to observe such a system collapse. Another major achievement working with bosons was his realization of matter wave solitons in a BEC.

Hulet has also performed pioneering experiments with degenerate Fermi gases. He achieved the first observation of a polarized degenerate Fermi gas, realized a degenerate Bose-Fermi mixture, and studied spin-imbalanced Fermi gases, including a possible realization of the FFLO state in a 1D system. His group has investigated fermions in optical lattices as a model of systems of solid-state physics, and observed short-range antiferromagnetism in a Hubbard system, similar to physics also observed in the cuprate high-temperature superconductors.

Hulet has received a number of awards for his work, including the Herbert Walther Prize in 2017, the Willis E. Lamb Award for Laser Science and Quantum Optics in 2011, the I. I. Rabi Prize of the American Physical Society in 1995, and a Presidential Young Investigator Award from the National Science Foundation in 1989. He is a Fellow of the American Association for the Advancement of Science, Optica, and the American Physical Society. Hulet is an honorary doctor of the University of Utrecht.

== Selected publications ==
- Hart, Russell A.; Duarte, Pedro M.; Yang, Tsung-Lin; Liu, Xinxing; Paiva, Thereza; Khatami, Ehsan; Scalettar, Richard T.; Trivedi, Nandini; Huse, David A.; Hulet, Randall G. (23 February 2015). "Observation of antiferromagnetic correlations in the Hubbard model with ultracold atoms". Nature. 519 (7542): 211–214. arXiv:1407.5932. Bibcode:2015Natur.519..211H. doi:10.1038/nature14223. PMID 25707803. S2CID 4463418.
- Liao, Y.; Rittnerr, A. S. C.; Paprotta, T.; Li, W.; Partridge, G. B.; Hulet, R. G.; Baur, S. K.; Mueller, E. J. (2010). "Spin-imbalance in a one-dimensional Fermi gas". Nature. 467 (7315): 567–569. arXiv:0912.0092. Bibcode:2010Natur.467..567L. doi:10.1038/nature09393. PMID 20882011. S2CID 4397457.
- Strecker, K. E.; Partridge, G. B.; Truscott, A. G.; Hulet, R. G. (2002). "Formation and propagation of matter-wave soliton trains". Nature. 417 (6885): 150–153. arXiv:cond-mat/0204532. Bibcode:2002Natur.417..150S. doi:10.1038/nature747. PMID 11986621. S2CID 9411228.
- Truscott, A. G.; Strecker, K. E.; McAlexander, W. I.; Partridge, G. B.; Hulet, R. G. (2001). "Observation of Fermi Pressure in a Gas of Trapped Atoms". Science. 291 (5513): 2570–2572. Bibcode:2001Sci...291.2570T. doi:10.1126/science.1059318. PMID 11283362. S2CID 31126288.
- Gerton, J. M.; Strekalov, D.; Prodan, I.; Hulet, R. G. (2000). "Direct observation of growth and collapse of a Bose-Einstein condensate with attractive interactions". Nature. 408 (6813): 692–695. arXiv:cond-mat/0011513. Bibcode:2000Natur.408..692G. doi:10.1038/35047030. PMID 11130065. S2CID 4420297.
- Bradley, C. C.; Sackett, C. A.; Tolett, J. J.; Hulet, R. G. (1995). "Evidence of Bose-Einstein Condensation in an Atomic Gas with Attractive Interactions". Phys. Rev. Lett. 75 (9): 1687–1690. Bibcode:1995PhRvL..75.1687B. doi:10.1103/PhysRevLett.75.1687. hdl:1911/79442. PMID 10060366.
