= Chipp =

Chipp is an English surname. Notable people with the surname include:

- Annetta R. Chipp (1866–1961), American temperance leader and prison evangelist
- Don Chipp (1925–2006), Australian politician
- Edmund Thomas Chipp (1823–1886), English organist and composer
- Herbert Chipp (1850–1903), English tennis player

== See also ==
- Chopp, another surname
- Chupp (surname), another surname
