= Monika Schleier-Smith =

American physicist

- Education: Harvard University; MIT
- Known for: Quantum systems of interacting atoms, photons and phonons; Hybrid quantum systems; Quantum simulation; Driven-dissipative dynamics
- Awards: MacArthur Fellowship; Sloan Research Fellow; NSF CAREER Award; NSF Graduate Research Fellow
- Scientific career
- Fields: Atomic, molecular, and optical physics; Quantum optics; Quantum technology
- Workplaces: Stanford University
- Doctoral advisor: Vladan Vuletić

Monika Schleier-Smith is an American experimental physicist studying many-body quantum physics by precisely assembling systems of ultracold atoms. Her research helps connect the world of theoretical and experimental physics. These atomic, molecular, and optical physics (AMO) engineered systems have applications in quantum sensing, coherent control, and quantum computing. Schleier-Smith is an associate professor of physics at Stanford University, a MacArthur Fellow, a Sloan Research Fellow, and a National Science Foundation CAREER Award recipient. Schleier-Smith also serves on the board of directors for the Hertz Foundation and also works to improve education through speaking and serving on panels.

== Early life ==
Schleier-Smith grew up in the Alexandria, Virginia area. Her mother holds a Ph.D. in linguistics. She has an older brother. Schleier-Smith attended Thomas Jefferson High School for Science and Technology, where she had an opportunity to conduct nanotechnology research at the MITRE Corporation.

Schleier-Smith completed her undergraduate studies at Harvard University, where she received a B.A. in Chemistry and Physics and (secondarily) Mathematics in 2005.

Schleier-Smith pursued graduate studies at MIT on a National Science Foundation Graduate Research Fellowship and under the supervision of Vladan Vuletić. At MIT, she earned a Ph.D. in physics in 2011, and her doctoral thesis introduced a quantum-enhanced atomic clock and was recognized by the Hertz Foundation with a Doctoral Thesis Prize. She also received the Stroock-Hertz Fellowship, named in honor of mathematician and MIT professor Daniel W. Stroock.

From 2011 to 2013, Schleier-Smith conducted postdoctoral research at LMU Munich with Professor Immanuel Bloch's group at Max Planck Institute of Quantum Optics.

== Career ==
In the fall of 2013, Schleier-Smith joined the Stanford faculty, where she is currently an associate professor in the Department of Physics. The Schleier-Smith Lab exploits precise hybrid light–matter interactions to demonstrate engineered dynamics in cold atom systems. According to Schleier-Smith, "Hybrid systems are likely to harbor surprises that will fuel quantum science for decades to come". An important regime under investigation is the entanglement frontier.

In 2020, Schleier-Smith was named a MacArthur Fellow, for her quantum technology research, and received an unrestricted stipend of $625,000.

In 2024, she was named one of the Gordon and Betty Moore Foundation's Experimental Physics Investigators, and received a five-year, $1.25 million grant for her research at Stanford.

== Personal ==
During her years at Harvard and MIT, Schleier-Smith completed the Boston Marathon six times.

== Recognition and awards ==
- Alfred P. Sloan Research Fellowship, Alfred P. Sloan Foundation (2014)
- AFOSR Young Investigator Award, Air Force Office of Scientific Research (2014)
- Hellman Fellowship, Hellman Fellows Fund (2015)
- Cottrell Scholar Award, Research Corporation (2017)
- NSF Career Award, National Science Foundation (2018)
- Listed as top 10 scientists to watch by Science News Journal (2019)
- Presidential Early Career Award for Scientists and Engineers (PECASE), Department of Defense (2019)
- MacArthur Fellowship, MacArthur Foundation (2020)
- I.I Rabi Prize in Atomic, Molecular and Optical Physics, American Physical Society (2021)
- Fellow of the American Physical Society (2021)
- Benjamin Franklin NextGen Award (2024)

== Publications ==
Her recent publications include:

- Rudelis A, Hu B, Sinclair J, Bytyqi E, Schwartzman A, Brenes R, Kadosh Zhitomirsky T, Schleier-Smith M, Vuletić V. Degradation of TaO / SiO dielectric cavity mirrors in ultra-high vacuum. Optics Express. 31: 39670–39680. PMID 38041283 DOI: 10.1364/OE.504858
- Hines JA, Rajagopal SV, Moreau GL, Wahrman MD, Lewis NA, Marković O, Schleier-Smith M. Spin Squeezing by Rydberg Dressing in an Array of Atomic Ensembles. Physical Review Letters. 131: 063401. PMID 37625064 DOI: 10.1103/PhysRevLett.131.063401
- Schleier-Smith M. Solving a puzzle with atomic qubits. Science. 376: 1155–1156. PMID 35679424 DOI: 10.1126/science.abq3754
- Davis EJ, Periwal A, Cooper ES, Bentsen G, Evered SJ, Van Kirk K, Schleier-Smith MH. Protecting Spin Coherence in a Tunable Heisenberg Model. Physical Review Letters. 125: 060402. PMID 32845652 DOI: 10.1103/PhysRevLett.125.060402
- Borish V, Marković O, Hines JA, Rajagopal SV, Schleier-Smith M. Transverse-Field Ising Dynamics in a Rydberg-Dressed Atomic Gas. Physical Review Letters. 124: 063601. PMID 32109106 DOI: 10.1103/Physrevlett.124.063601
- Bentsen G, Hashizume T, Buyskikh AS, Davis EJ, Daley AJ, Gubser SS, Schleier-Smith M. Treelike Interactions and Fast Scrambling with Cold Atoms. Physical Review Letters. 123: 130601. PMID 31697527 DOI: 10.1103/Physrevlett.123.130601
- Davis EJ, Bentsen G, Homeier L, Li T, Schleier-Smith MH. Photon-Mediated Spin-Exchange Dynamics of Spin-1 Atoms. Physical Review Letters. 122: 010405. PMID 31012698 DOI: 10.1103/PhysRevLett.122.010405
- Bentsen G, Potirniche I, Bulchandani VB, Scaffidi T, Cao X, Qi X, Schleier-Smith M, Altman E. Integrable and Chaotic Dynamics of Spins Coupled to an Optical Cavity Physical Review X. 9. DOI: 10.1103/Physrevx.9.041011
- Marino J, Shchadilova YE, Schleier-Smith M, Demler EA. Spectrum, Landau–Zener theory and driven-dissipative dynamics of a staircase of photons New Journal of Physics. 21: 013009. DOI: 10.1088/1367-2630/Aaf825
