= Francis M. Pipkin Award =

American biannual physics prize

The Francis M. Pipkin Award is a physics prize given by the American Physical Society (APS) every two years since 1999.

The award was established in 1997 by the American Physical Society's the Topical Group on Precision Measurement and Fundamental Constants as a memorial tribute to Francis M. Pipkin (1925–1992). The award consists of $3,000 plus travel expenses to the APS meeting where the award is conferred. The award is intended for promising young physicists so the requirement for eligibility is that the award recipient must have held the Ph.D. degree for not more than 15 years prior to the nomination deadline. The APS award selection committee selects the award recipient from award nominees on the basis of outstanding research in precision measurement and fundamental physical constants, as represented by the nominees's publications and by three nominating letters containing supplemental information. All APS members, except the members of the APS award selection committee, are allowed to submit nominations.

== Recipients ==
- 1999: Steven Keith Lamoreaux
- 2001: Jens H. Gundlach
- 2003: Eric A. Hessels
- 2005: Ronald L. Walsworth
- 2007: David DeMille
- 2009: Zheng-Tian Lu
- 2011: Michael Romalis
- 2013: Randolf Pohl
- 2015: Holger Mueller
- 2017: Jens Dilling
- 2019: Tanya Zelevinsky
- 2021: Andrew D. Ludlow
- 2023: Andrew A. Geraci
- 2025: Kyle G. Leach
