= Mark Saffman =

American quantum computing physicist

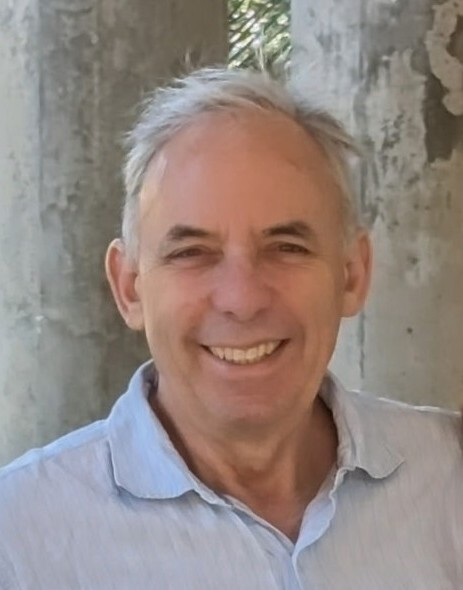
- Education: California Institute of Technology (BSc, 1981); University of Colorado Boulder (PhD, 1994)
- Known for: Rydberg blockade; Neutral-atom quantum computing
- Awards: Fellow of the American Physical Society (2008); Fellow of Optica (2014); John Stewart Bell Prize (2025); Norman F. Ramsey Prize (2026)
- Scientific career
- Fields: Atomic, molecular, and optical physics; Atomic physics; Quantum information science
- Workplaces: University of Wisconsin–Madison; Infleqtion
- Thesis: Self-Organized Formation of Image Representations in Photorefractive Oscillations (1994)
- Doctoral advisor: Dana Anderson

Mark Saffman is the Johannes Rydberg Professor of Physics at the University of Wisconsin–Madison and Chief Scientist for Quantum Information at Infleqtion (formerly ColdQuanta). From 2019-2026 he was the Director of the Wisconsin Quantum Institute. He is known for his work on neutral-atom quantum computing using Rydberg interactions. In 2008, he was elected a Fellow of the American Physical Society for his contributions to atomic and optical physics , and in 2014 he was named a Fellow of Optica for his contributions to neutral-atom quantum computing with Rydberg-state interactions . In 2025, he was co-awarded the 9th John Stewart Bell Prize for pioneering contributions to quantum simulation and quantum computing with neutral atoms. He is also the co-recipient of the 2026 Norman F. Ramsey Prize, awarded for outstanding contributions to atomic, molecular, and optical physics .

== Education and career ==
Saffman earned a BSc with honors in applied physics from the California Institute of Technology in 1981 and a PhD in physics from the University of Colorado Boulder in 1994. After positions in industry and at Risø National Laboratory in Denmark, he joined the UW–Madison faculty in 1999, where he became associate professor in 2004 and full professor in 2007. At UWM he has supervised 26 PhD theses, and mentored 21 postdocs. He has served as director of the Wisconsin Quantum Institute and has held editorial roles with Physical Review journals.

Saffman has concurrently held an industry role as Chief Scientist for Quantum Information at ColdQuanta/Infleqtion since 2018.

== Research ==
In the 1990's Saffman studied nonlinear optical effects, primarily in photorefractive media. In his PhD thesis a self-organizing topology preserving neural network was implemented in nonlinear optical resonators. This was followed by a series of pioneering experiments on soliton formation, wave instabilities, and pattern formation in photorefractive crystals. The soliton studies included the first observations of snake and neck instabilities of dark and bright 1D optical solitons in 1996. In 2002 his research group reported the first observation of temporal self-pulsing in quadratic nonlinear media, a phenomenon which had been predicted in the late 1970s by K. J. McNeil, P. D. Drummond, and D. F. Walls.

Since 2000 Saffman’s research has primarily been in atomic physics, quantum optics, and quantum information processing with neutral atoms, especially using the Rydberg blockade mechanism to implement entangling quantum gates. His review article “Quantum information with Rydberg atoms” (with T. G. Walker and K. Mølmer) in Reviews of Modern Physics helped consolidate the field. His group reported deterministic entanglement of two neutral atoms via Rydberg blockade and a neutral-atom CNOT gate in 2010.

== Honors and awards ==
- Norman F. Ramsey Prize (APS), (2026)
- 9th John Stewart Bell Prize, (2025)
- WARF Professorship (UW–Madison), (2022)
- WARF Innovation Award, 2019
- Fellow, Optica (class of 2014).
- Fellow, American Physical Society (2008).
- Sloan Research Fellowship, (2001)

== Selected publications ==
- Saffman, Mark; Walker, T. G.; Mølmer, Klaus (2010). "Quantum information with Rydberg atoms" (PDF). Reviews of Modern Physics. 82 (3): 2313–2363. arXiv:0909.4777. Bibcode:2010RvMP...82.2313S. doi:10.1103/RevModPhys.82.2313.
- Zhang, X. L.; Isenhower, L.; Gill, A. T.; Walker, T. G.; Saffman, Mark (2010). "Deterministic entanglement of two neutral atoms via Rydberg blockade". Physical Review A. 82 (3) 030306. arXiv:1007.0397. Bibcode:2010PhRvA..82c0306Z. doi:10.1103/PhysRevA.82.030306.
