= David DeMille =

American physicist and professor

- Born: David DeMille
- Education: University of Chicago (B.A.), University of California, Berkeley (Ph.D.)
- Awards: Francis M. Pipkin Award (2007); Norman F. Ramsey Prize (2024)
- Scientific career
- Fields: Physics (atomic physics)
- Workplaces: Amherst College (1997–1998); Yale University (1998–2020); University of Chicago (2020 – 2025); Argonne National Laboratory (2020 – ) Johns Hopkins University (2025 – )
- Doctoral advisor: Eugene Commins

David P. DeMille is an American physicist and Bloomberg Distinguished Professor of atomic/molecular physics and precision measurement at Johns Hopkins University. He holds appointments in the Department of Physics and Astronomy in the Krieger School of Arts and Sciences and in the Research and Exploratory Development Department at the Applied Physics Laboratory. He is best known for his use of polar diatomic molecules to search for symmetry-violating effects within the molecules and as a means for manipulating the external properties of the molecules.

His group was the first to accomplish laser cooling of a diatomic molecule, achieved in 2010 using strontium monofluoride (SrF). He is also known for his precise measurements in the ACME EDM Experiment which constrain the upper limit of the electron electric dipole moment using a beam of thorium monoxide, conducted in collaboration with the groups of Gerald Gabrielse and John Doyle at Harvard. DeMille is currently also leading the CeNTREX collaboration, an experiment to measure the nuclear Schiff moment of the thallium nucleus inside a thallium fluoride molecule.

He was elected a fellow of the American Physical Society in 2005, and was awarded the 2024 Norman F. Ramsey Prize in Atomic, Molecular and Optical Physics, and in Precision Tests of Fundamental Laws and Symmetries of the APS. In 2024, DeMille was elected to the National Academy of Sciences, one of the highest honors in the scientific field in the United States.

== Selected bibliography ==
- D DeMille (2015). "Diatomic molecules, a window onto fundamental physics". Physics Today. 68 (12).
- D DeMille (2002). "Quantum computation with trapped polar molecules". Physical Review Letters. 88 (6).
- LD Carr, D DeMille, RV Krems, J Ye (2009). "Cold and ultracold molecules: science, technology and applications". New Journal of Physics. 11 (5).
- BC Regan, ED Commins, CJ Schmidt, D DeMille (2002). "New limit on the electron electric dipole moment". Physical review letters. 88 (7).
