= Kate Kirby =

American physicist

Kate P. Kirby
- Scientific career
- Thesis: Accurate AB initio calculations of energy and properties for ground and excited states of lithium hydride

Kate Page Kirby is an American physicist. From February 2015 to December 2020, Kirby was the chief executive officer of the American Physical Society (APS) and sits on the board of directors of the American Institute of Physics. Kate Kirby was elected a fellow of the American Physical Society (APS) in 1989 for her "innovative application of methods of quantum chemistry to the quantitative elucidation of a diverse range of molecular phenomena." She was made a fellow of the American Association for the Advancement of Science (AAAS) in 1996 for her contributions to physics.

== Education ==
Kirby graduated from Harvard University in Cambridge, Massachusetts with a Bachelor of Arts (B.A) in physics and chemistry in 1967. Later she received her MS degree in Chemistry and PhD degree in chemical physics from the University of Chicago in Illinois. The title of her 1972 doctoral thesis is "Accurate AB initio calculations of energy and properties for ground and excited states of lithium hydride."

== Career ==
Kirby held a postdoctoral research position at Harvard College Observatory and then became a research physicist at the Smithsonian Astrophysical Observatory in Cambridge, Massachusetts. She served as the associate director for the Center for Astrophysics | Harvard & Smithsonian, heading the Atomic and Molecular Physics Division from 1989 until 2001. She was the director of the National-Science-Foundation-funded Institute for Theoretical Atomic, Molecular and Optical Physics (ITAMP) at Center for Astrophysics | Harvard & Smithsonian from 2001 to 2007. Kirby was named as the executive officer of the American Physical Society (APS) in May 2009, a position she began in July of the same year, replacing Judy Franz. On assuming the role, Kirby said "Having served the Society for well over two decades as a volunteer on a number of committees, the Council and Executive Board, I am excited to be joining the APS leadership team." She added, "I look forward to working with APS staff and the membership to advocate for physics in the public arena and to serve the community of physicists throughout the U.S. and the world." Kirby became the American Physical Society's chief executive officer in 2015 after a restructuring of the organization. She served as the chief officer of APS till 2021. Kirby has been an active partner with the American Association for the Advancement of Science (AAAS).

== American Physical Society ==
Kirby has long-standing links with the American Physical Society (APS), serving in a number of leadership roles at the organization. These include: APS councilor-at-large from 1991-1993; vice-chair, chair-elect, and chair of the society's Division of Atomic, and Molecular Physics (DAMOP) from 1995-1998; and divisional councilor for the Division of Atomic, Molecular and Optical Physics (DAMOP) (2003–07). She was elected to the APS executive board in 2005, serving on the board for two years.

Kirby has chaired and served on numerous American Physical Society (APS) committees, including the fellowship committee (1993–95), the nominating committee (1994–96), the APS Ethics Task Force (2002-2003), and the Committee on Prizes and Awards (2005-2006).

== Research ==
Kirby is a theoretical atomic and molecular physicist. Her research focused on the calculation of atomic and molecular processes important in astrophysics and atmospheric physics. During her career she studied photon absorption of atoms and molecules. She also studied the collision processes between atoms that occur in the atmospheres of astrophysical bodies like brown dwarf stars and planetary nebulae. Kirby later worked on processes for forming ultracold polar molecules using lasers and applying the method to create platforms for quantum computing.
