= Jun Ye =

Chinese-American physicist

- 叶军
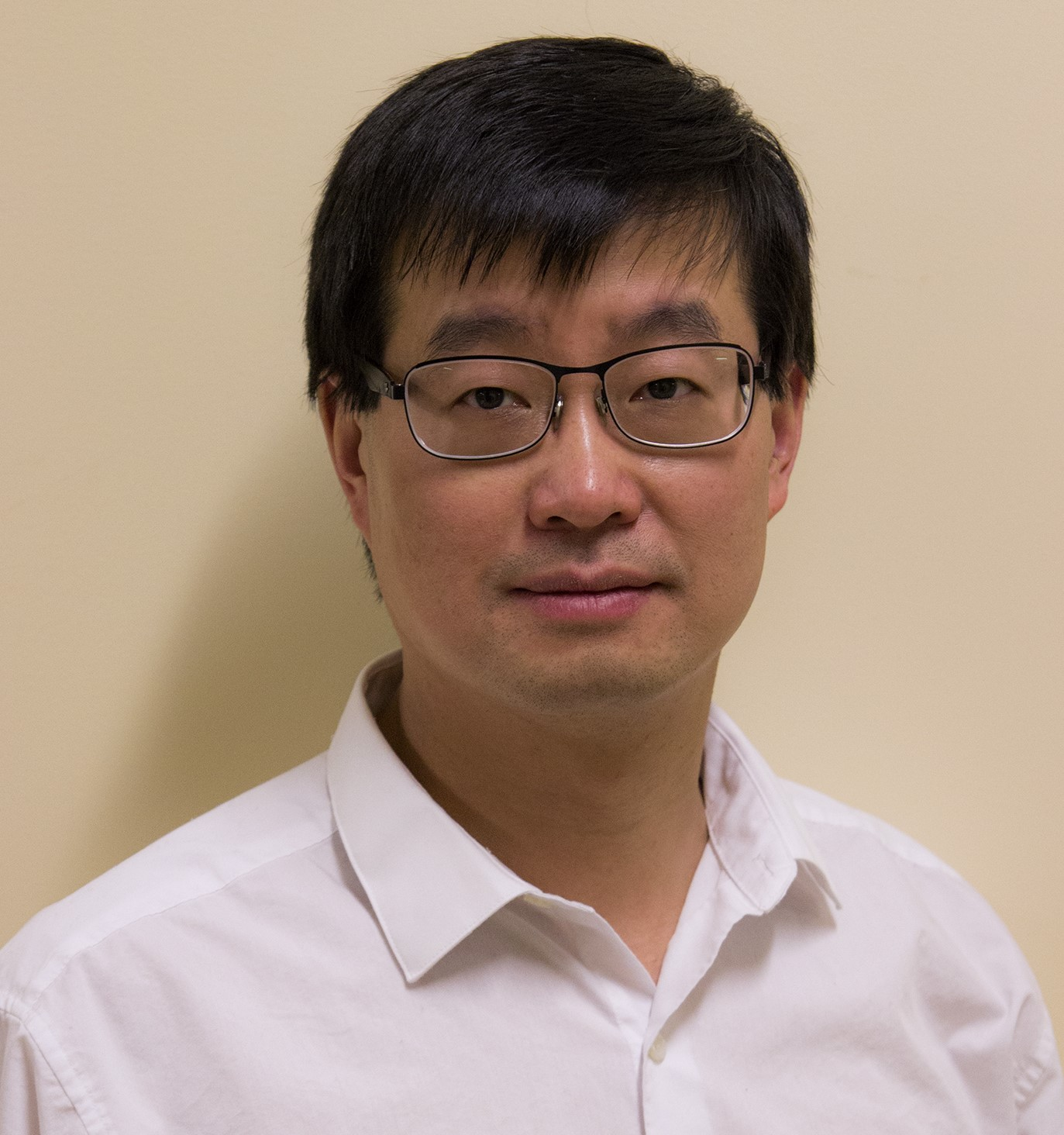
- Jun Ye in 2015
- Born: 1967 (age 58–59); Shanghai, China
- Education: Shanghai Jiao Tong University (BS); University of New Mexico (MS); University of Colorado at Boulder (PhD)
- Known for: Atomic clocks, ultracold molecules, precision spectroscopy, frequency combs
- Awards: Department of Commerce Gold Medal (2001, 2011, 2014); Arthur S. Flemming Award (2005); Carl Zeiss Research Award (2007); William F. Meggers Award (2007); I.I. Rabi Prize in Atomic, Molecular or Optical Physics (2007); Elected to the National Academy of Sciences (2011); Presidential Rank Award (2015); Norman F. Ramsey Prize in Atomic, Molecular and Optical Physics, and in Precision Tests of Fundamental Laws and Symmetries (2019); Micius Quantum Prize (2020); Niels Bohr Institute Medal of Honour (2021); Breakthrough Prize in Fundamental Physics (2022); Wolf Prize in Physics (2026)
- Scientific career
- Fields: Physics
- Workplaces: National Institute of Standards and Technology; JILA; University of Colorado at Boulder
- Doctoral advisor: John L. Hall

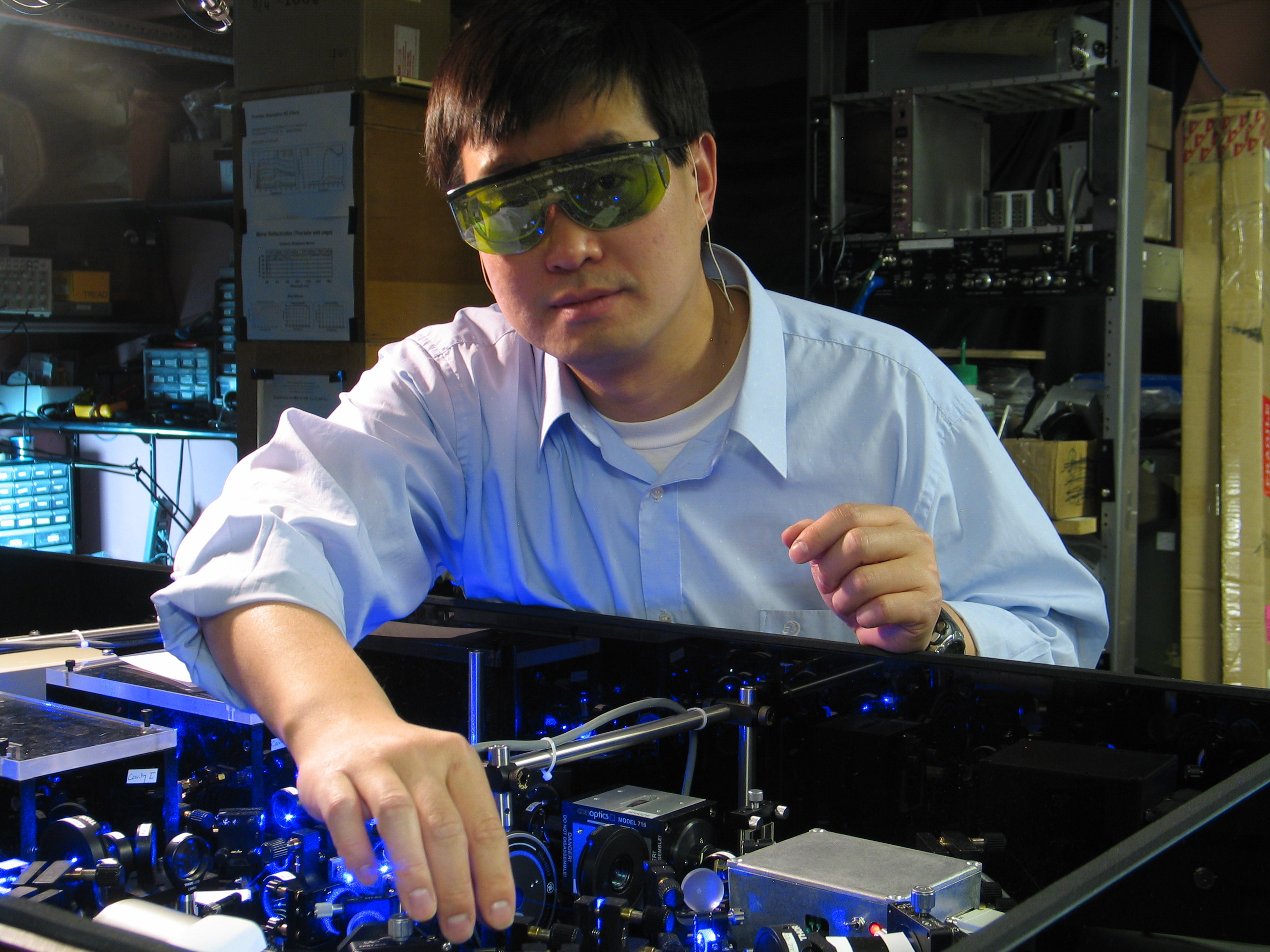
NIST physicist Jun Ye adjusts the laser setup for a strontium atomic clock in his laboratory at JILA in 2009.

Jun Ye (Chinese: 叶军; pinyin: Yè Jūn; born 1967) is a Chinese-American physicist at JILA, National Institute of Standards and Technology, and the University of Colorado Boulder, working primarily in the field of atomic, molecular, and optical physics.

== Education and career ==
Ye was born in Shanghai, China, shortly after the beginning of the Cultural Revolution. His father was a naval officer and his mother an environmental scientist. He was primarily raised by his grandmother. Ye graduated with a bachelor's degree in physics from Shanghai Jiao Tong University in 1989. He then moved to the United States to commence graduate studies, completing a master's degree at the University of New Mexico under Marlan Scully in theoretical quantum optics in 1991. He also gained experience in experimental physics under John McInerney working on semiconductor lasers, and spent a summer at the Los Alamos National Laboratory.

Ye then went to the University of Colorado Boulder to begin a Ph.D. in physics. He was accepted as the last graduate student of eventual Nobel Prize laureate John L. Hall. His thesis was on high-resolution and high-sensitivity molecular spectroscopy, which he completed in 1997. He then moved to California Institute of Technology as a Milikan Postdoctoral Fellow, working under Jeff Kimble.

Ye moved back to Boulder and JILA as a JILA Associate Fellow and NIST physicist in 1999. John Hall donated most of his lab space to him. He was promoted to full Fellow in 2001 and has been there since, establishing a research program in AMO physics and precision measurement.

== Research ==
Ye's research focuses on ultracold atoms, ultracold molecules, and laser-based precision measurement. In 2018 JILA reported that the 3D quantum gas clock reached a frequency precision of 2.5 × 10^{−19} over 6 hours.

Such clocks could potentially be used for research into variations in the Earth's gravitational field, searching for particles of dark matter, performing quantum simulations of many-body physics, and investigating the fundamental nature of light and matter. He also conducts research on strontium for experiments in quantum information science (collaborating with Mikhail Lukin, Ana Maria Rey, Peter Zoller, and others).

== Popularization of science ==
Ye appeared in the 2018 Netflix documentary The Most Unknown on scientific research directed by Ian Cheney.

== Honors and awards ==
Ye has received numerous awards in the field of science, particularly AMO physics. These include:

- the Adolph Lomb Medal of OSA in 1999
- the Arthur S. Flemming Award for outstanding federal employees in 2005
- the Friedrich Wilhelm Bessel Research Award from the Humboldt Foundation in 2006
- the William F. Meggers Award of the Optical Society of America in 2006
- the Carl Zeiss Research Award in 2007
- the I. I. Rabi Prize in AMO Physics from the APS in 2007
- five Gold Medals from the US Department of Commerce: for frequency combs (2001), ultracold molecules (2011), atomic clocks (2014, 2019, and 2022)
- the Samuel Wesley Stratton Award in 2006 from NIST
- the Jacob Rabinow applied research award in 2017 from NIST
- the 2019 Norman F. Ramsey Prize of the APS for his ground-breaking contributions to precision measurements and the quantum control of atomic and molecular systems, including atomic clocks
- the 2022 Breakthrough Prize in Fundamental Physics
- the Julius Springer Prize for Applied Physics in 2021
- the Herbert Walther Award from Optica and Deutsche Physikalische Gesellschaft (DPG) in 2022
- the Niels Bohr Institute Medal of Honor in 2022
- the Vannevar Bush Faculty Fellowship from the Department of Defense in 2022
- the 2026 Wolf Prize in Physics

In 2015, President Obama selected Jun Ye to receive a Presidential Rank Award for “sustained extraordinary accomplishment”, citing his work advancing "the frontier of light-matter interaction and focusing on precision measurement, quantum physics and ultracold matter, optical frequency metrology, and ultrafast science." He was elected a Fellow of the American Physical Society and a Fellow of the Optical Society of America. In 2011 he was elected to the National Academy of Sciences, and also named a Frew Fellow from the Australian Academy of Science. In 2017, Ye was elected as a foreign member of the Chinese Academy of Sciences.

He is one of the most highly cited researchers in experimental atomic physics in the world, having according to Google Scholar a h-index of 120 (As of 2022) and being regularly named as a Thomson-Reuters (ISI) Highly Cited Researcher.

Ye also holds four U.S. Patents for frequency combs and laser technology.
