= Institute for Theoretical Atomic, Molecular and Optical Physics =

International scientific learned society

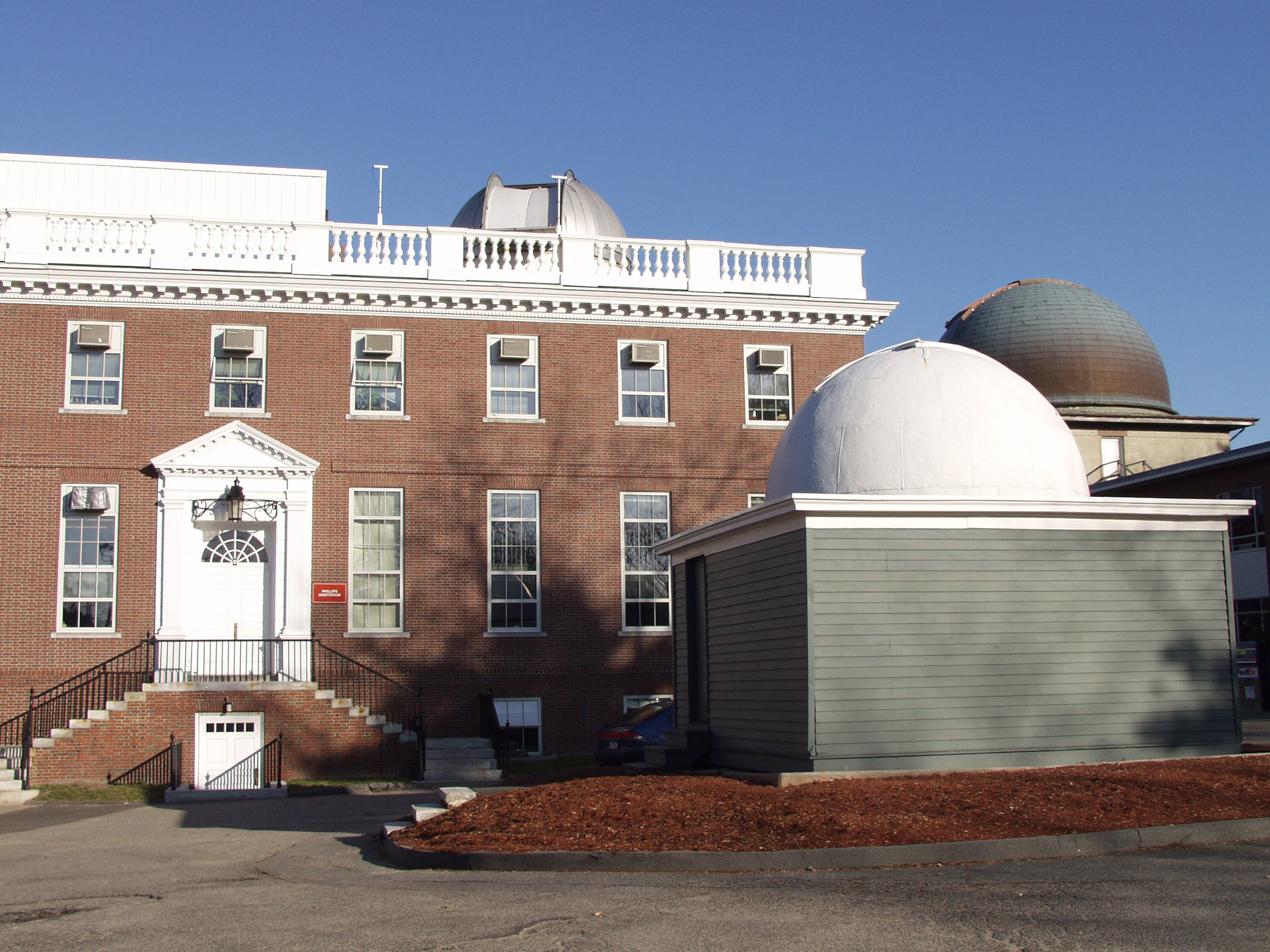
Center for Astrophysics, Cambridge, Massachusetts

The Institute for Theoretical Atomic, Molecular and Optical Physics (ITAMP) is an international scientific learned society based at the Center for Astrophysics | Harvard & Smithsonian in Cambridge, Massachusetts. It was established in 1988 to alleviate a perceived shortage of theorists in atomic, molecular, and optical physics (AMO) at major universities throughout America. AMO concerns the study of matter-matter and light–matter interactions at the scale of one or a few atoms.

The stated objectives of the Institute are:

- To attract and train scientists of the highest quality in theoretical atomic, molecular, and optical physics
- To maintain an active visitors' program to bring senior researchers together for scientific collaboration
- To establish a strong post-doctoral fellowship program.

The objectives are tackled by fostering an intellectually stimulating environment, developing pioneering research areas, facilitating closer interactions between AMO theory and experiment and promoting AMO theory within the general physics community.

It has been involved in some capacity in most of the National Research Council target areas, i.e. precision measurements and tests of fundamental laws, ultracold physics, the development and application of ultra-intense, short wavelength light sources, ultra-fast quantum control of atoms, molecules and electrons, nanoscience, and quantum information science.

The Institute is sponsored by the National Science Foundation, the Smithsonian Institution, the Center for Astrophysics | Harvard & Smithsonian and Harvard University.

== History ==
The Armstrong Report in 1987 on "The State of Theoretical Atomic, Molecular and Optical Sciences in the United States" (National Academy Press, 1987) recommended the setting up of an institute to facilitate the exchange of scientific knowledge and ideas in the AMO field. ITAMP, originally the Institute for Theoretical Atomic and Molecular Physics was set up in 1988 at Harvard University under its first director Alexander Dalgarno to fulfil that need. The name was changed in 2002 to the Institute for Theoretical Atomic, Molecular and Optical Physics although the established ITAMP acronym remained unchanged.

Dalgarno handed control over to Rick Heller in 1993, who left the post in 1998. It was then directed (from 2001) by Kate Kirby, who was later joined as joint director by Misha Lukin. In 2016 the director is Hossein Sadeghpour.
