= Norman F. Ramsey Prize =

Physics prize

The Norman F. Ramsey Prize in Atomic, Molecular and Optical Physics, and in Precision Tests of Fundamental Laws and Symmetries is a prize given by the American Physical Society. It is awarded for outstanding work in the field of atomic, molecular, and optical physics, especially in the precision measurement of physical constants, tests of fundamental laws and symmetries, and precision spectroscopy. Instituted in 2016, the prize pays tribute to Nobel Laureate Norman Ramsey, celebrated for pioneering contributions such as the separated oscillatory field method and the hydrogen maser. It consists of $10,000 plus travel expenses to the annual meeting of the Division of Atomic, Molecular, and Optical Physics (DAMOP) where the prize is bestowed.

== Recipients ==
- 2018: Peter Zoller
- 2019: Jun Ye
- 2020: Philip H. Bucksbaum
- 2021: Dmitry Budker
- 2022: Mikhail Lukin
- 2023: Olga Kocharovskaya
- 2024: David DeMille, Gerald Gabrielse, John Doyle
- 2025: Alan Kostelecký
- 2026: Mark Saffman, Antoine Browaeys

== See also ==
- List of physics awards
- List of American Physical Society prizes and awards
