= Commission of the Russian Federation for UNESCO =

- Комиссия Российской Федерации по делам ЮНЕСКО
- UNESCO logo

Agency overview
- Preceding agency: Commission of the USSR for UNESCO
- Jurisdiction: Government of Russia
- Headquarters: 32/34 Smolenskaya-Sennaya Square, Moscow; 55°44′46″N 37°35′3″E
- Agency executives: Sergey Lavrov, President of the Commission; Alexander Dzasokhov, Deputy President; Grigory Ordzhonikidze, Secretary-General
- Website: http://unesco.ru

The Commission of the Russian Federation for UNESCO is a governmental coordinating body ensuring cooperation of the Government of the Russian Federation, federal executive bodies, other bodies and organizations, as well as scientists and specialists with the United Nations Educational, Scientific and Cultural Organization (UNESCO).

The Commission was established in accordance with the UNESCO Constitution, which implies the establishment of National Commissions in Member States responsible for the involvement of leading educational, scientific and cultural institutions in the activities of the Organization.

== General description ==
The UNESCO Constitution requires a National Commission in member states. National Commissions take on the role of actively involving states in cooperation with members at international level in order to preserve peace and promote humanist ideas, education, science, communication, and culture internationally. According to the Constitution, National Commissions are privileged partners of the international Organization, called upon to contribute to the realization of UNESCO's programmes. In its interests and on the basis of this document Russia founded the Commission of the Russian Federation for UNESCO.

On April 6, 1954, Soviet Minister of Foreign Affairs Vyacheslav Molotov submitted an application to join UNESCO. On April 21, 1954 the USSR Ambassador to the United Kingdom Yakov Malik put his signature under UNESCO Constitution, thereby marking the accession to it of the Soviet Union, Belarusian SSR and Ukrainian SSR.

In 1955, the USSR Commission for UNESCO was established, headed by the Minister of Culture Nikolai Mikhailov. Its initial composition consisted of 35 members - the heads of government agencies, scientists and educators, artists and cultural figures.

After the collapse of the USSR, Russia took the country's place in UNESCO as its legal successor and follower. In the same year the Commission of the Russian Federation for UNESCO was established.

== Members of the Commission ==
The President of the Commission of the Russian Federation for UNESCO is appointed by the Government of the Russian Federation. Since 2004 this position is held by Minister of Foreign Affairs of the Russian Federation Sergey Lavrov. In 2012 Ambassador Extraordinary and Plenipotentiary of the Russian Federation Alexander Dzasokhov was appointed as Deputy President of the Commission of the Russian Federation for UNESCO.

The composition of the Commission is approved by the Government of the Russian Federation upon the proposal of the President of the Commission. It includes heads of relevant Russian ministries and agencies, prominent national figures of education, science, culture, art and journalism.

The highest body of the Commission is the General Assembly, which develops and approves Russia's policy towards UNESCO. Meetings of the General Assembly of the Commission are convened at least once a year.

The working body of the Commission is its Secretariat, which is a part of the Ministry of Foreign Affairs of the Russian Federation. It is headed by the Secretary-General of the Commission, appointed by the President of the Commission. Since 2004 Grigory Ordzhonikidze, Ambassador-at-Large for the Russian Ministry of Foreign Affairs, has been serving as Secretary-General of the Commission.

== Tasks ==
The Commission of the Russian Federation for UNESCO has the following tasks:

- promote the participation of federal executive bodies, other bodies and organizations, as well as scientists and specialists enjoying recognized authority in the field of UNESCO activities, in activities and programmes carried out under the auspices of UNESCO;
- ensure within the limits of their competence the fulfillment of international legal obligations arising from membership of the Russian Federation in UNESCO;
- prepare instructions to official delegations of the Russian Federation and representatives to UNESCO bodies and assist them in their work;
- disseminate information on UNESCO and its programme activities;
- cooperate with National Commissions for UNESCO of other states;
- participate in recruitment of candidates for work in the Permanent Delegation of the Russian Federation to UNESCO, UNESCO Secretariat, as well as for work on UNESCO projects in other states;
- provide informational and advisory assistance to federal executive bodies, other bodies and organizations, as well as scientists and specialists enjoying recognized authority in the field of UNESCO activities, in accordance with its competence.

== Activities of the Commission ==
In its current activities the Commission of the Russian Federation for UNESCO relies on its programmes committees, which are advisory bodies uniting leading Russian specialists in particular areas of UNESCO expertise.

== Vestnik of the Commission of the Russian Federation for UNESCO ==
The official press organ of the Commission of the Russian Federation for UNESCO is the Vestnik of the Commission of the Russian Federation for UNESCO, which was founded in 2005. Regular editions of the magazine are issued quarterly, periodically special issues are prepared, devoted to certain aspects of cooperation between Russia and UNESCO. The journal is distributed through diplomatic channels in Member States and the Secretariat of the Organization, as well as is freely available on the website of the Commission.
