= Mikhail Lukin =

Russian physicist

- Born: October 10, 1971 (age 55); Moscow, Russian SFSR
- Education: MIPT; Texas A&M University
- Scientific career
- Fields: Physics
- Workplaces: Max Planck Institute of Quantum Optics; Harvard University
- Thesis: Quantum Coherence and Interference in Optics and Laser Spectroscopy (1998)
- Doctoral advisor: Marlan Scully

Mikhail Dmitrievich Lukin (Russian: Михаи́л Дми́триевич Луки́н; born 10 October 1971) is a Russian theoretical and experimental physicist and a professor at Harvard University. He was elected a member of the National Academy of Sciences in 2018.

== Early life ==
Mikhail "Misha" Lukin was born in Moscow, Russia. He studied physics and mathematics at MIPT, and he graduated in 1993. Following his graduation, he joined Texas A&M University where he wrote a research paper titled Quantum Coherence and Interference in Optics and Laser Spectroscopy that he used for his Ph.D. thesis. Between this and 1994 he was a visiting scientist at the Max Planck Institute of Quantum Optics in Garching, Germany. Later on he became a postdoc at Texas A&M University and then became a fellow, and later joint director, of the Institute for Theoretical Atomic and Molecular Physics a division of Center for Astrophysics | Harvard & Smithsonian. In 2001 he became an assistant professor at Harvard and three years later became its professor. In 2023, Lukin became the Joshua and Beth Friedman University Professor at Harvard University.

== Research ==
In 2005 he proposed an idea to use quantum computing mail rather than Email which is already used by both Harvard and Boston Universities. He and Vladan Vuletic experimentally confirmed a new type of matter in which photonic molecules can be used to create a lightsaber-like technology.

In a 2013 interview with The Harvard Crimson he explained that he observed the matter the same way as it is in the movies, but unlike the movies the objects don't pass through each other but rather behave like solid objects.

Lukin is a Fellow of the Optical Society of America.

== Awards ==
- 2000 – The Optical Society of America Adolph Lomb Medal
- 2009 – American Physical Society I. I. Rabi Prize in Atomic, Molecular, and Optical Physics
- 2021 – The Optical Society of America Charles Hard Townes Medal for pioneering theoretical and experimental contributions to quantum nonlinear optics and quantum information science and technology, and for the development and application of nanoscale quantum systems for sensing
- 2022 – American Physical Society Norman F. Ramsey Prize in Atomic, Molecular and Optical Physics, and in Precision Tests of Fundamental Laws and Symmetries
