= Timothy E. Chupp =

American physicist

Timothy Edward Chupp
- Education: University of Washington; Princeton University
- Awards: I. I. Rabi Prize (1993); LANSCE Rosen Scholar (2020); Breakthrough Prize in Fundamental Physics (2026)
- Scientific career
- Fields: Physics
- Workplaces: University of Michigan (1991–); Princeton University; Harvard University
- Thesis: Parity nonconservation in the hydrogen atom (1983)

Timothy E. Chupp is an American scientist and educator and is currently a Professor of Physics and Biomedical Engineering at the University of Michigan. He has also taught at Princeton and Harvard.

Chupp is fellow of the American Association for the Advancement of Science and a fellow of the American Physical Society. In 1993 he was awarded the I. I. Rabi Prize. In 2020 he was named the Los Alamos Neutron Science Center Rosen Scholar.

He has broad-ranging interests in experimental physics, precision measurement in particle physics, and applications in metrology and biomedicine. He is also the founder of Michigan Magnetometry LLC.

== Education ==
Chupp earned his B.S. in physics from Princeton University in 1977, and his Ph.D. from the University of Washington in 1983.

== Research ==
Chupp has broad research interests in experimental physics, including particle physics, atomic physics, and nuclear physics. His applied work includes precision magnetometry, nuclear magnetic resonance and MRI with laser polarized xenon. He has co-authored over 170 papers.

His most recent work uses precision measurement techniques and symmetry principles in particle physics investigations, applied to a wide variety of research questions, including measurement of the anomalous magnetic dipole moment (g-2) of muons at Fermilab, as well as atomic and neutron electric-dipole-moment measurements. The results of this latest research challenge the Standard Model with new precision measurements that deviate from Standard Model predictions well beyond experimental error.

== Public lectures ==
Chupp has given a number of lectures to the public, including for the University of Michigan Saturday Morning Physics program and Sloan Foundation Science and Film Series and other channels, on topics including on muons, solar neutrinos, the physics of vision, and the physics of baseball and basketball.

== Select publications ==
- Jackson Kimball DF, Budker D, Chupp TE, Geraci AA, Kolkowitz S, Singh JT, et al. (July 17, 2023). "Probing fundamental physics with spin-based quantum sensors". Physical Review A. 108 (1): 0110101. Bibcode:2023PhRvA.108a0101J. doi:10.1103/PhysRevA.108.010101. ISSN 2469-9926.
- Abi B, Albahri T, Al-Kilani S, Allspach D, Alonzi LP, Anastasi A, et al. (April 7, 2021). "Measurement of the Positive Muon Anomalous Magnetic Moment to 0.46 ppm". Physical Review Letters. 126 (14) 141801. arXiv:2104.03281. Bibcode:2021PhRvL.126n1801A. doi:10.1103/PhysRevLett.126.141801. ISSN 0031-9007. PMID 33891447.
- Farooq M, Chupp T, Grange J, Tewsley-Booth A, Flay D, Kawall D, et al. (June 5, 2020). "Absolute Magnetometry with He 3". Physical Review Letters. 124 (22) 223001. doi:10.1103/PhysRevLett.124.223001. ISSN 0031-9007. OSTI 1660733. PMID 32567926.
- Sachdeva N, Fan I, Babcock E, Burghoff M, Chupp TE, Degenkolb S, et al. (October 4, 2019). "New Limit on the Permanent Electric Dipole Moment of Xe 129 Using He 3 Comagnetometry and SQUID Detection". Physical Review Letters. 123 (14) 143003. arXiv:1909.12800. Bibcode:2019PhRvL.123n3003S. doi:10.1103/PhysRevLett.123.143003. ISSN 0031-9007. PMID 31702217.
- Chupp TE, Fierlinger P, Ramsey-Musolf MJ, Singh JT (January 4, 2019). "Electric dipole moments of atoms, molecules, nuclei, and particles". Reviews of Modern Physics. 91 (1) 015001. arXiv:1710.02504. Bibcode:2019RvMP...91a5001C. doi:10.1103/RevModPhys.91.015001. ISSN 0034-6861.
- Altarev I, Babcock E, Beck D, Burghoff M, Chesnevskaya S, Chupp T, et al. (July 1, 2014). "A magnetically shielded room with ultra low residual field and gradient". Review of Scientific Instruments. 85 (7). arXiv:1403.6467. Bibcode:2014RScI...85g5106A. doi:10.1063/1.4886146. ISSN 0034-6748. PMID 25085172.
- Gaffney LP, Butler PA, Scheck M, Hayes AB, Wenander F, Albers M, et al. (May 2013). "Studies of pear-shaped nuclei using accelerated radioactive beams". Nature. 497 (7448): 199–204. Bibcode:2013Natur.497..199G. doi:10.1038/nature12073. ISSN 0028-0836. PMID 23657348.
- Chupp TE, Cooper RL, Coulter KP, Freedman SJ, Fujikawa BK, Jones GL, et al. (March 2013). "Time reversal and the neutron: Results of the emiT II experiment". Hyperfine Interactions. 214 (1–3): 97–104. Bibcode:2013HyInt.214...97C. doi:10.1007/s10751-013-0776-y. ISSN 0304-3843.
