= Buffer gas =

A buffer gas is an inert or nonflammable gas. In the Earth's atmosphere, nitrogen acts as a buffer gas. A buffer gas adds pressure to a system and controls the speed of combustion with any oxygen present. Any inert gas such as helium, neon, or argon will serve as a buffer gas.

A buffer gas usually consists of atomically inert gases such as helium, argon, or nitrogen. Krypton, neon, and xenon are also used, primarily for lighting. In most scenarios, buffer gases are used in conjunction with other molecules for the main purpose of causing collisions with the other co-existing molecules.

Buffer gases are commonly used in many applications from high pressure discharge lamps to reduce line width of microwave transitions in alkali atoms.

== Uses ==
=== Lighting ===
In fluorescent lamps, mercury is used as the primary ion from which light is emitted. Krypton is the buffer gas used in conjunction with the mercury which is used to moderate the momentum of collisions of mercury ions in order to reduce the damage done to the electrodes in the fluorescent lamp. Generally speaking, the longest lasting lamps are those with the heaviest noble gases as buffer gases.

=== Industrial ===
Buffer gases are also commonly used in compressors used in power plants for supplying gas to gas turbines. The buffer gas fills the spaces between seals in the compressor. This space is usually about 2 micrometres wide. The gas must be completely dry and free of any contaminants. Contaminants can potentially lodge in the space between the seal and cause metal to metal contact in the compressor, leading to compressor failure. In this case the buffer gas acts in a way much like oil does in an automotive engine's bearings.

=== Buffer gas cooling ===
Buffer gas loading techniques have been developed for use in cooling charged or paramagnetic atoms and molecules at ultra-cold temperatures. The buffer gas most commonly used in this sort of application is helium.

Suppose we have some very cold helium gas as cryogenic buffer gas, then any cloud of particles floating within that buffer gas would exchange energy with the buffer gas, until it reaches the same temperature (thermalized). The problem is that the cloud of particles would diffuse away.

In buffer gas cooling, the cloud of particles we want to cool down is caught in a trap that lets the helium atom pass through. If the particles are electrically charged, then the trap can be the Penning trap or the Paul trap. If the particles are electrically neutral, but paramagnetic, then the trap can be a magnetic trap (as helium is diamagnetic), such as the anti-Helmholtz pair. Paramagnetic atoms are low-field-seeking while diamagnetic atoms are high-field-seeking, so in a magnetic trap, there is a central region where the magnetic field is zero, rising in all directions. Paramagnetic atoms would be trapped in that zero-field region while the diamagnetic atoms would be repelled away.

Buffer gas cooling can be used on just about any molecule, as long as the molecule is capable of surviving multiple collisions with low energy helium atoms, which most molecules are capable of doing. Buffer gas cooling is allowing the molecules of interest to be cooled through elastic collisions with a cold buffer gas inside a chamber. If there are enough collisions between the buffer gas and the other molecules of interest before the molecules hit the walls of the chamber and are gone, the buffer gas will sufficiently cool the atoms. Of the two isotopes of helium (^{3}He and ^{4}He), the rarer ^{3}He is sometimes used over ^{4}He as it provides significantly higher vapor pressures and buffer gas density at sub-kelvin temperatures.
