= Thorium monoxide =

Names
- IUPAC names Thorium monoxide Thorium(II) oxide

Identifiers
CAS Number	12035-93-7
3D model (JSmol)	Interactive image
PubChem CID	157401513
- InChI: InChI=1S/O.Th Key: OEANRDRPVNMNRM-UHFFFAOYSA-N
- SMILES: [Th]=O

Properties
Chemical formula	ThO
Molar mass	248.04 g·mol^{−1}
Appearance	black solid

Structure
Crystal structure	face-centered cubic
Lattice constant	a = 4.31 Å
- Except where otherwise noted, data are given for materials in their standard state (at 25 °C [77 °F], 100 kPa). Infobox references

Thorium monoxide (thorium(II) oxide), is the binary oxide of thorium having chemical formula ThO. In the vapor phase, it is a diatomic molecule.

== Gaseous (molecular) form ==
Laser ablation of thorium in the presence of oxygen produces vapor-phase thorium monoxide. Thorium monoxide molecules contain a highly polar covalent bond. The effective electric field between the two atoms has been calculated to be about 80 gigavolts per centimeter, one of the largest known internal effective electric fields.

== Solid form ==
Simple combustion of thorium in air produces thorium dioxide. However, exposure of a thin film of thorium to low-pressure oxygen at medium temperature forms a rapidly growing layer of thorium monoxide under a more-stable surface coating of the dioxide.

At extremely high temperatures, thorium dioxide can convert to the monoxide either by a comproportionation reaction (equilibrium with liquid thorium metal) above 1,850 K (1,580 °C; 2,870 °F) or by simple dissociation (evolution of oxygen) above 2,500 K (2,230 °C; 4,040 °F).

ThO_{2} + Th_{(l)} ⇌ 2 ThO_{(s)}
ThO_{2} → ThO_{(s)} + ½ O_{2}
