= Laser cooling =

Cooling technique in atomic physics

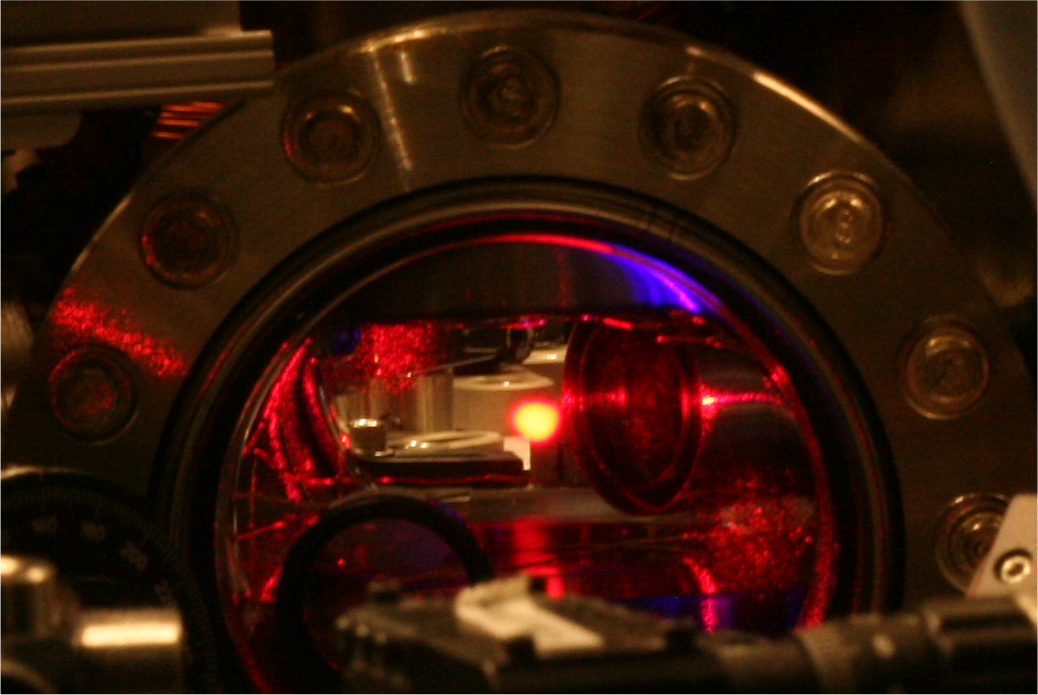
A photo of laser-cooled lithium atoms. The bright blob corresponds to roughly 7 billion lithium atoms scattering the 671 nm light used to laser cool them to a temperature of a few hundred microkelvin. The cloud is about 5 mm in extent. A window of the vacuum system where the lithium is trapped along with supporting optics can be seen in the foreground. The lithium atoms are then evaporatively cooled to make a Bose–Einstein condensate.

Laser-cooled lithium atoms being loaded into a magneto-optical trap from a Zeeman slower

Laser cooling includes several techniques where atoms, molecules, and small mechanical systems are cooled with laser light. The directed energy of lasers is often associated with heating materials, e.g. laser cutting, so it can be counterintuitive that laser cooling often results in sample temperatures approaching absolute zero. It is routinely used in atomic physics experiments where the laser-cooled atoms are manipulated and measured. It is also used in technologies, such as atom-based quantum computing architectures.

Laser cooling reduces the random thermal motion of particles or the random vibrations of mechanical systems. For atoms and molecules this reduces Doppler shifts in spectroscopy, allowing for high precision measurements and instruments such as optical clocks. The reduction in thermal energy also allows for efficient loading of atoms and molecules into traps where they can be used in experiments or atom-based devices for longer periods of time.

Laser cooling relies on the momentum change when an object, such as an atom, absorbs and re-emits a photon (a particle of light). Atoms will be cooled in one dimension if they are illuminated by a pair of counter-propagating laser beams whose frequencies (and energy) are less than the atoms' laser-cooling transition. Standard cooling transitions are atomic transitions with certain properties such as short lifetimes with correspondingly broad natural linewidths. Light will be preferentially absorbed from the laser beam that counter-propagates with respect to an atom's motion due to the Doppler effect. The absorbed light is then re-emitted by the atom in a random direction. The repetition of this process reduces the random motion of the atoms along the laser cooling axis. With three pairs of counter-propagating laser beams along the three spatial directions a warm cloud of atoms will be cooled in three dimensions. Such a cold atom cloud will expand more slowly because of the decrease in the cloud's velocity distribution, which corresponds to a lower temperature and therefore colder atoms. For an ensemble of particles, their thermodynamic temperature is proportional to the variance in their velocity, therefore the lower the distribution of velocities, the lower the temperature of the particles.

== History ==
=== Radiation pressure ===
Radiation pressure from the Sun propels gas/ions and dust away from the nucleus of a comet in two distinct tails. The lighter gas particles are ejected straight away from the Sun, while the heavier dust particles follow a curved trajectory.

Radiation pressure is the force that electromagnetic radiation exerts on matter. In 1873, James Clerk Maxwell published his treatise on electromagnetism where he predicted radiation pressure. The force was experimentally demonstrated for the first time by Pyotr Lebedev and reported at the International Congress of Physics during the 1900 Exposition Universelle in Paris, and later published in more detail in 1901. Following Lebedev's measurements Ernest Fox Nichols and Gordon Ferrie Hull also demonstrated the force of radiation pressure in 1901, with a refined measurement reported in 1903.

Light can drive atomic (or molecular) transitions which change the atom's internal state and give the atom a momentum kick (radiation pressure). Transitions are strongly driven when the light's frequency is near an atomic or molecular transition frequency. The sodium atom is historically notable because it has a strong transition at 589 nm, a wavelength which is close to the peak sensitivity of the human eye. This made it relatively easy to see the interaction of light with sodium atoms. In 1933, Otto Frisch deflected an atomic beam of sodium atoms with light. This was the first realization of radiation pressure acting on an atom or molecule.

=== Laser cooling proposals ===
The introduction of lasers in atomic spectroscopy experiments was the precursor to the laser cooling proposals in the mid 1970s. Laser cooling was proposed separately in 1975 by two different research groups: Theodor W. Hänsch and Arthur Leonard Schawlow, and David J. Wineland and Hans Georg Dehmelt. Both proposals outlined the simplest laser cooling process, known as Doppler cooling, where laser light tuned below an atom's resonant frequency is preferentially absorbed by atoms moving towards the laser and after absorption a photon is emitted in a random direction.

In 1977 Arthur Ashkin submitted a paper which describes how Doppler cooling could be used to provide the necessary damping to load atoms into an optical trap. In this work he emphasized how this could allow for long spectroscopic measurements which would increase precision. He also discussed overlapping optical traps to study interactions between different atoms.

=== First laser cooling results ===
Following the laser cooling proposals, in 1978 two research groups, that of Wineland, Robert Drullinger and Fred Walls of National Institute of Standards and Technology (NIST), and that of Werner Neuhauser, Martin Hohenstatt, Peter E. Toschek and Dehmelt of the University of Washington succeeded in laser cooling atoms. The NIST group was motivated to reduce the effect of Doppler broadening on spectroscopy. They cooled magnesium ions in a Penning trap to below 40 K. The Washington group cooled barium ions.

The first laser cooling of neutral atoms was realized with sodium by Victor Balykin, Vladilen Letokhov and Vladimir Minogin at the Institute for Spectroscopy Russian Academy of Sciences in Moscow in 1981.

Influenced by the Wineland's work on laser cooling ions, William Daniel Phillips laser cooled neutral atoms. In 1982, he published a paper where neutral atoms were laser cooled. The process used is now known as the Zeeman slower and is a standard technique for slowing an atomic beam. In 1985, they improved the experiment using a magneto-optical trap devised by David E. Pritchard.

In 1985, John L. Hall at NIST was able fully stop the atoms using the frequency chirp technique.

=== Optical molasses and atomic fountains ===
In 1985, Steven Chu, Ashkin and J. E. Bjorkholm at Bell Labs, attempted to realize the Doppler cooling proposal of Hänsch and Schawlow using a pre-frequency chirped cooled laser, and later the atoms drifted into six pair-wise laser beams. The motion of the atoms was described as a viscous medium that they called optical molasses. They determined that the temperature was about 0.24 mK with a lifetime of 0.1 s. In 1987, Pritchard and Chu developed a better magneto-optical trap suggested by Jean Dalibard, using three counter-propagating lasers, circular polarization and a weak magnetic field.

Suggested by Jerrold R. Zacharias and Hänsch, Chu created an atomic fountain for spectroscopy measurements. Using Norman Ramsey Jr. idea, atoms were resonantly excited by a succession of two microwave pulses. This technique allowed the creation of precise atomic clocks.

=== Sub-Doppler cooling and sub-recoil cooling ===
Philips at NIST in 1988 discovered that optical molasses could reach 40 micro-kelvin, far below the temperatures predicted by theoretical the Doppler limit, a phenomenon they dubbed Sisyphus cooling. The violation of the limit was confirmed by Chu at Stanford University and by Claude Cohen-Tannoudji and Dalibard at the École normale supérieure in Paris, who explained the phenomena in terms of polarization gradient cooling. In 1989, Philips collaborated in further experiments in the École normale to explain the phenomenon. This sub-Doppler cooling is limited by the recoil temperature.

In the 1970s, experiments by Ennio Arimondo in the University of Pisa showed that the atomic cloud could be set into a dark state. Cohen-Tannoudji, Arimondo and Alain Aspect used this to develop velocity selective coherent population trapping (VSCPT). This technique was first applied in 1D in 1988, in 2D in 1994, and in 3D in 1995. By using this technique, they were able to go below the recoil limit for 1D in 1988 by a factor of 2. Cohen-Tannoudji and Aspect showed in 1994 the principle in 2D, going below the recoil temperature limit by a factor of 16. And finally in 1995, showed a 3D experiment where they went below the limit by a factor of 21.

The 1997 Nobel Prize in Physics was awarded to Claude Cohen-Tannoudji, Steven Chu, and William Daniel Phillips "for development of methods to cool and trap atoms with laser light".

=== Modern advances ===
==== Atoms ====
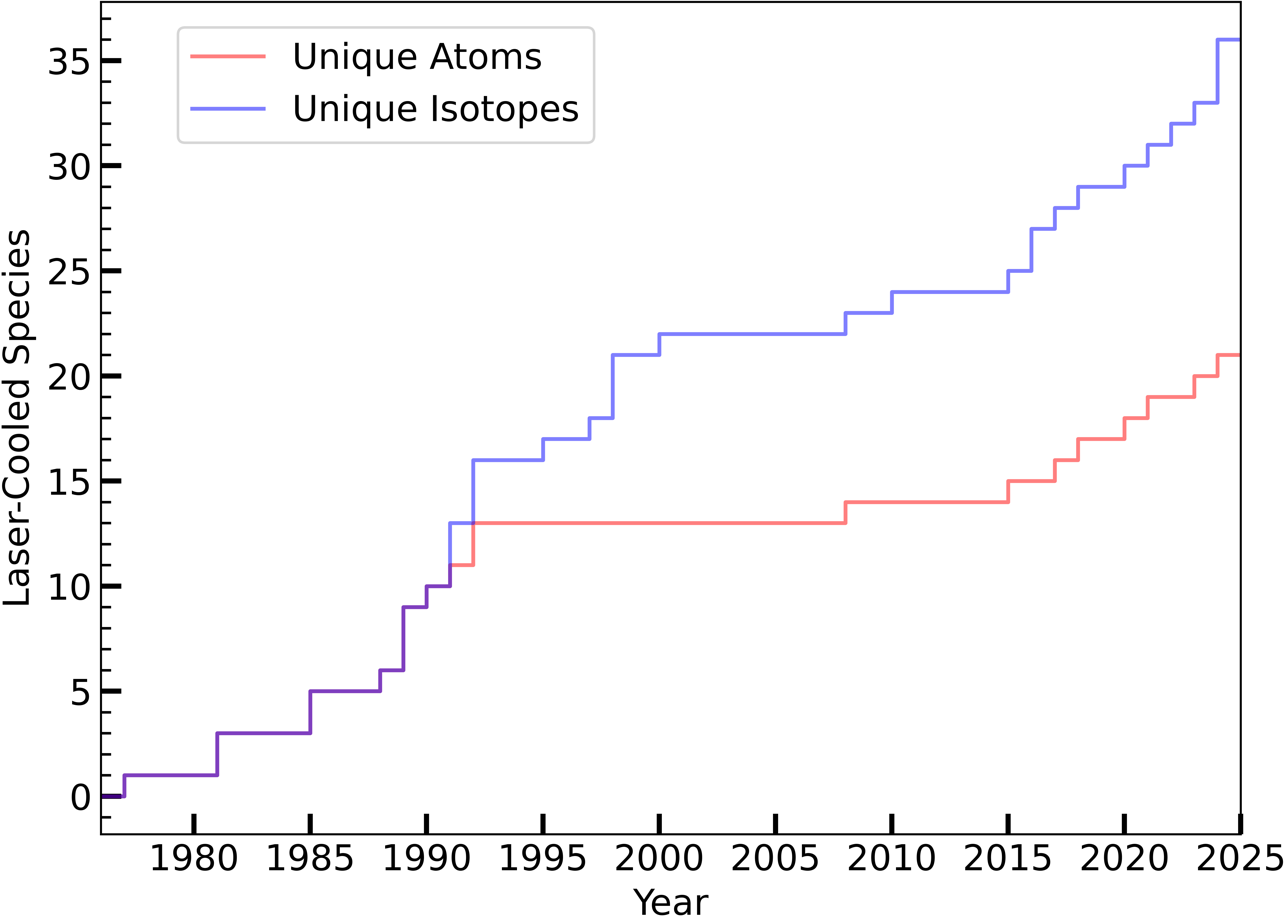
The cumulative number of unique atomic systems, including different ionization states, (red) and unique isotopes (blue) that have been laser cooled vs. year.

The Doppler cooling limit for electric dipole transitions is typically in the hundreds of microkelvins. In the 1980s this limit was seen as the lowest achievable temperature. It was a surprise then when sodium atoms were cooled to 43 microkelvins when their Doppler cooling limit is 240 microkelvins, this unforeseen low temperature was explained by considering the interaction of polarized laser light with more atomic states and transitions. Previous conceptions of laser cooling were decided to have been too simplistic. This results were a major part of the 1997 Nobel Prize in Physics which was awarded to Claude Cohen-Tannoudji, Steven Chu, and William Daniel Phillips "for development of methods to cool and trap atoms with laser light".

The major laser cooling breakthroughs in the 70s and 80s led to several improvements to preexisting technology and new discoveries with temperatures just above absolute zero. The cooling processes were utilized to make atomic clocks more accurate and to improve spectroscopic measurements, and led to the observation of a new state of matter at ultracold temperatures. The new state of matter, the Bose–Einstein condensate, was observed in 1995 by Eric Cornell, Carl Wieman, and Wolfgang Ketterle.

==== Exotic atoms ====
Most laser cooling experiments bring atoms close to rest in the laboratory frame, but cooling of relativistic atoms has also been achieved (narrowing their velocity distribution). In 1990, a group at JGU laser cooled a ^{7}Li^{+} beam in a storage ring from 260 K to below 3 K using two counter-propagating lasers addressing the same transition, but at 514.5 nm and 584.8 nm to compensate for the large Doppler shift.

Laser cooling of antimatter has also been demonstrated, first in 2021 by the ALPHA collaboration on antihydrogen atoms. In 2024, positronium, made up of an electron and a positron, was laser cooled to about 1K.

==== Molecules ====
Directly laser cooled molecules.

Molecules are significantly more challenging to laser cool than atoms because molecules have vibrational and rotational degrees of freedom. These extra degrees of freedom result in more energy levels that can be populated from excited state decays, requiring more lasers compared to atoms to address the more complex level structure. Vibrational decays are particularly challenging because there are no symmetry rules that restrict the vibrational states that can be populated.

In 2010, at team at Yale led by Dave DeMille successfully laser-cooled a diatomic molecule. In 2016, a group at MPQ successfully cooled formaldehyde to 420 μK via optoelectric Sisyphus cooling. In 2022, a group at Harvard successfully laser cooled and trapped CaOH to 720(40) μK in a magneto-optical trap.

==== Mechanical systems ====
Starting in the 2000s, laser cooling was applied to small mechanical systems, ranging from small cantilevers to the mirrors used in the LIGO observatory. These devices are connected to a larger substrate, such as a mechanical membrane attached to a frame, or they are held in optical traps; in both cases the mechanical system is a harmonic oscillator. Laser cooling reduces the random vibrations of the mechanical oscillator, removing thermal phonons from the system.

In 2007, an MIT team successfully laser-cooled a macro-scale (1 gram) object to 0.8 K. In 2011, a team from the California Institute of Technology and the University of Vienna became the first to laser-cool a (10 μm × 1 μm) mechanical object to its quantum ground state.

== Methods ==
The first realization of laser cooling and the most ubiquitous method for cooling atoms and molecules (so much so that it is often referred to simply as 'laser cooling'), is Doppler cooling.

=== Doppler cooling ===
Doppler cooling is by far the most common method of laser cooling. It is used to cool low density gases down to the Doppler cooling limit, which for rubidium (a popular choice in the field of atomic physics) is around 150 microkelvin. It is often combined with a magnetic field gradient to realize a magneto-optical trap.

In Doppler cooling, initially, the frequency of light is tuned slightly below an electronic transition in the atom. Because the light is detuned to the "red" (i.e. at lower frequency) of the transition, the atoms will absorb more photons if they move towards the light source, due to the Doppler effect. Thus if one applies light from two opposite directions, the atoms will always scatter more photons from the laser beam pointing opposite to their direction of motion. In each scattering event the atom loses a momentum equal to the momentum of the photon. If the atom, which is now in the excited state, then emits a photon spontaneously, it will be kicked by the same amount of momentum, but in a random direction. Since the initial momentum change is a pure loss (opposing the direction of motion), while the subsequent change is random, the probable result of the absorption and emission process is to reduce the momentum of the atom, and therefore its speed—provided its initial speed was larger than the recoil speed from scattering a single photon. If the absorption and emission are repeated many times, the average speed, and therefore the kinetic energy of the atom, will be reduced. Since the temperature of a group of atoms is a measure of the average random internal kinetic energy, this is equivalent to cooling the atoms.

When atoms are Doppler cooled in three dimensions, traditionally by 6 counter-propagating red-detuned laser beams, this is called optical molasses because the atoms move slowly, as if they are moving through molasses.

=== Sub-Doppler cooling ===
After Doppler cooling it is often helpful to cool atoms (or molecules) below their Doppler limit. This is accomplished with a variety of sub-Doppler cooling techniques. Different atomic structures are amenable to different sub-Doppler cooling techniques. For example, gray molasses is used with lithium and potassium because they have unresolved hyperfine structure in their excited states where polarization gradient cooling would not work.

Sub-Doppler cooling methods include:

- Sisyphus cooling
- Polarization gradient cooling
- Resolved sideband cooling
- Raman sideband cooling
- Velocity selective coherent population trapping (VSCPT)
- Gray molasses
- Electromagnetically induced transparency (EIT) cooling

=== Other methods ===
Other laser cooling methods include:

- Cavity-mediated cooling
- Anti-Stokes cooling in solids

== Applications ==
Laser cooling is ubiquitous in the field of atomic physics. Reducing the random motion of atoms has several benefits, including the ability to trap atoms with optical or magnetic fields. Spectroscopic measurements of a cold atomic sample will also have reduced systematic uncertainties due to thermal motion.

Often multiple laser cooling techniques are used in a single experiment to prepare a cold sample of atoms, which is then subsequently manipulated and measured. In a representative experiment a vapor of strontium atoms is generated in a hot oven that exit the oven as an atomic beam. After leaving the oven the atoms are Doppler cooled in two dimensions transverse to their motion to reduce loss of atoms due to divergence of the atomic beam. The atomic beam is then slowed and cooled with a Zeeman slower to optimize the atom loading efficiency into a magneto-optical trap (MOT), which Doppler cools the atoms, that operates on the ^{1}S_{0} → ^{1}P_{1} with lasers at 461 nm. The MOT transitions from using light at 461 nm to using light at 689 nm to drive the ^{1}S_{0} → ^{3}P_{1}, which is a narrow transition, to realize even colder atoms. The atoms are then transferred into an optical dipole trap where evaporative cooling gets them to temperatures where they can be effectively loaded into an optical lattice.

Laser cooling is important for quantum computing efforts based on neutral atoms and trapped atomic ions. In an ion trap Doppler cooling reduces the random motion of the ions so they form a well-ordered crystal structure in the trap. After Doppler cooling the ions are often cooled to their motional ground state to reduce decoherence during quantum gates between ions.

== Equipment ==
Laser cooling atoms requires scientific equipment that when assembled forms a cold atom machine. Such machines consist of two parts: a vacuum chamber which houses the laser cooled atoms and the laser systems used for cooling, as well as for preparing and manipulating atomic states and detecting the atoms. Laser cooling molecules generally requires more lasers and optical modulators (such as electro-optic and acousto-optic) to address the more complex molecular structure. Mechanical systems also need a vacuum system as the damping from background gases quickly equilibrates them with the gas's temperature. Mechanical systems usually need only one laser which is chosen for its reliability and coherence time, such as Nd:YAG lasers or Fiber lasers, as the mechanical devices are reflective over a very wide range of wavelengths.

=== Vacuum system ===
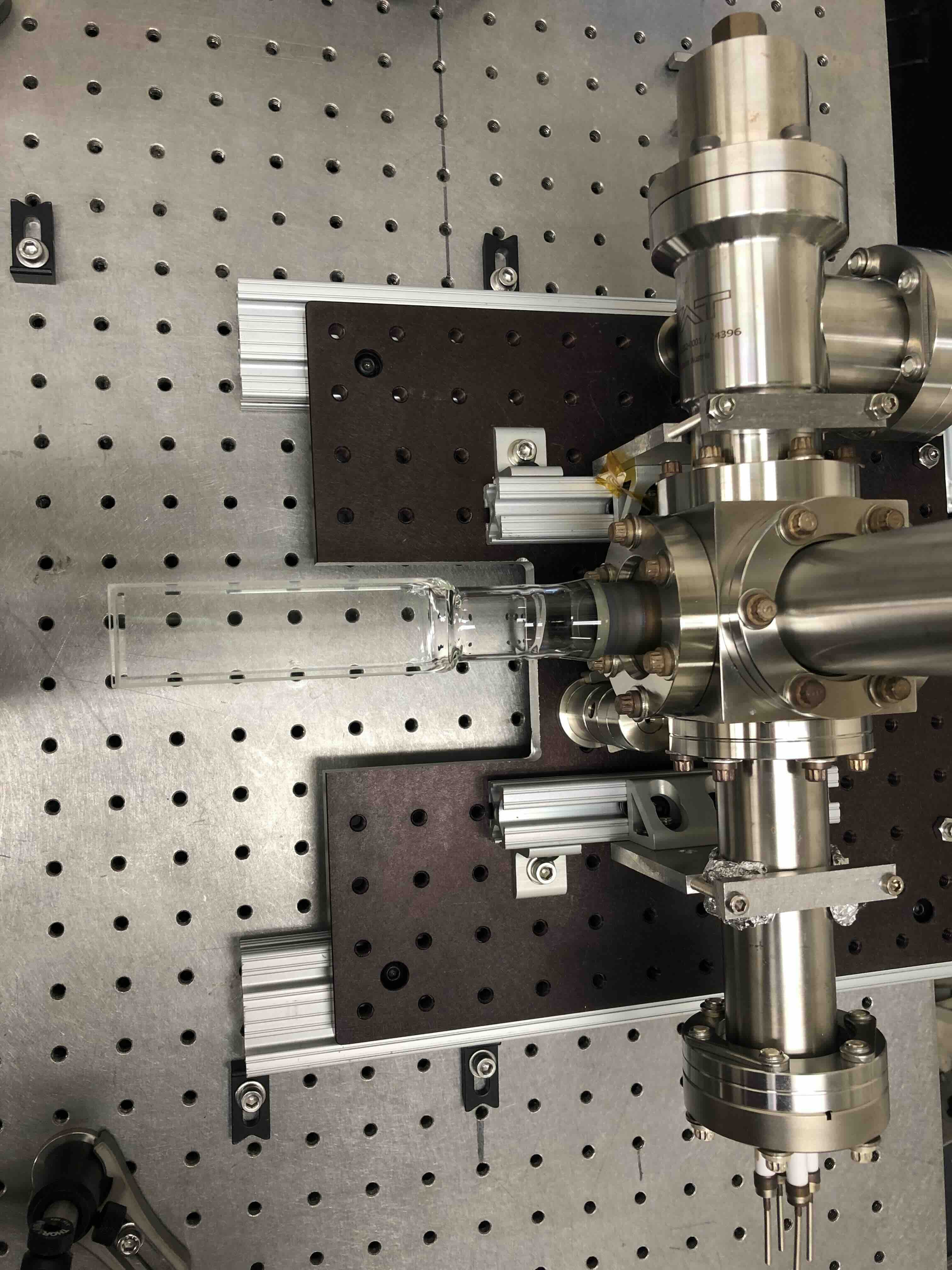
Vacuum chamber for a rubidium magneto-optical trap (MOT). The hole spacing of the breadboard is 1". The glass cell where atoms are trapped is on the left. This cell is inserted between magnetic field coils and the atoms are addressed by 6 counter-propagating beams to realize a MOT.

In order for atoms to be laser cooled, the atoms cannot collide with room temperature background gas particles. Such collisions will drastically heat the atoms, and knock them out of weak traps. Acceptable collision rates for cold atom machines typically require vacuum pressures at 10^{−9} Torr, and very often hundreds or even thousands of times lower pressures are necessary. To achieve these low pressures, a vacuum chamber is needed. The vacuum chamber typically includes windows so that the atoms can be addressed with lasers (e.g. for laser cooling) and light emitted by the atoms or absorption of light be the atoms can be detected. The vacuum chamber also requires an atomic source for the atom(s) to be laser cooled. The atomic source is generally heated to produce thermal atoms that can be laser cooled. For ion trapping experiments the vacuum system must also hold the ion trap, with the appropriate electric feedthroughs for the trap.

Neutral atom systems very often employ a Magneto-optical trap (MOT) as one of the early stages in collecting and cooling atoms. For a MOT, magnetic field coils are typically placed outside of the vacuum chamber to generate magnetic field gradients for the MOT.

=== Lasers ===
The laser required for cold atom machines are entirely dependent on the choice of atom. Each atom has unique electronic transitions at very distinct wavelengths that must be driven for the atom to be laser cooled. Rubidium, for example is a very commonly used atom which requires driving two transitions with laser light at 780 nm that are separated by a few GHz. The light for rubidium can be generated from a signal laser at 780 nm and an Electro-optic modulator. Generally tens of mW (and often hundreds of mW to cool significantly more atoms) is used to cool neutral atoms. Trapped ions on the other hand require microwatts of optical power, as they are generally tightly confined and the laser light can be focused to a small spot size. The strontium ion, for example requires light at both 422 nm and 1092 nm in order to be Doppler cooled. Because of the small Doppler shifts involved with laser cooling, very narrow lasers, order of a few MHz, are required for laser cooling. Such lasers are generally stabilized to spectroscopy reference cells, optical cavities, or sometimes wavemeters so the laser light can be precisely tuned relative to the atomic transitions.

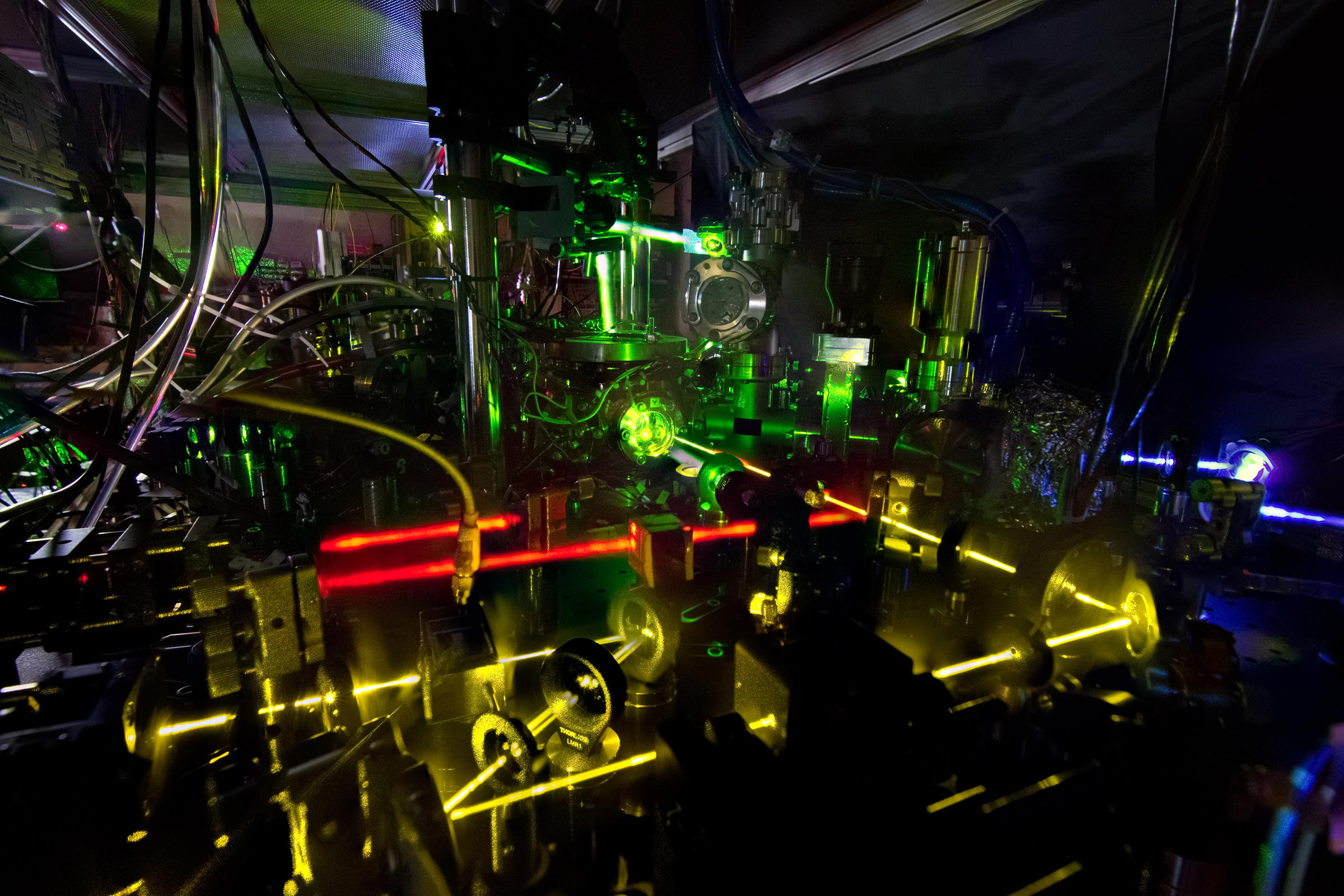
Laser beams used for cooling, trapping and interrogation of ytterbium atoms in an optical lattice clock.

== See also ==
- List of laser articles
- Optical tweezers – Scientific instruments
- Zeeman Slower – Instrument for slowing and cooling a beam of hot atoms
- Atomic clock
- Timeline of low-temperature technology
- Particle beam cooling
- Quantum refrigerators – Device converting heat flow into usable work at the nanoscale

== Additional sources ==
- Metcalf, H. J.; van der Straten, P. (1999). Laser Cooling and Trapping. Springer-Verlag. ISBN 978-0-387-98728-6.
- Foot, C. J. (2005). Atomic Physics. Oxford University Press. ISBN 978-0-19-850695-9.
- Cohen-Tannoudji, Claude; Guéry-Odelin, David (2011). Advances in Atomic Physics. doi:10.1142/6631. ISBN 978-981-277-496-5.
- Bowley, Roger; Copeland, Ed (2010). "Laser Cooling". Sixty Symbols. Brady Haran for the University of Nottingham.
- PhysicsWorld series of articles by Chad Orzel:
  - Cold: how physicists learned to manipulate and move particles with laser cooling
  - Colder: how physicists beat the theoretical limit for laser cooling and laid the foundations for a quantum revolution
  - Coldest: how a letter to Einstein and advances in laser-cooling technology led physicists to new quantum states of matter
