= Silke Ospelkaus =

German experimental physicist

Silke Ospelkaus-Schwarzer
- Education: University of Hamburg; University of Bonn
- Scientific career
- Workplaces: Max Planck Institute of Quantum Optics; JILA; NIST; University of Colorado Boulder; University of Hanover
- Thesis: Quantum degenerate Fermi-Bose mixtures of 40K and 87Rb in 3D-optical lattices (2007)

Silke Ospelkaus-Schwarzer is a German experimental physicist who studies ultra-cold molecular materials at the University of Hanover Institute of Quantum Optics. She was awarded a European Research Council Consolidator Award in 2022.

== Early life and education ==
Ospelkaus studied physics at the University of Bonn. She moved to the University of Hamburg for her doctoral research, where she studied Fermi-Bose mixtures of potassium and rubidium in optical lattices. She was awarded the doctoral prize of the German Physical Society. She moved to the JILA and the National Institute of Standards and Technology at the University of Colorado Boulder.

== Research and career ==
In 2009, Ospelkaus returned to Germany, where she was made a group leader at the Max Planck Institute of Quantum Optics. She investigates the behaviour of atomic and molecular gases at ultra-cold temperatures. In particular, ultra-cold molecular gases offer hope to better understand chemical processes. She has investigated two species atomic quantum gases mixtures, from which she can prepare polar molecules in a degenerate state.

By cooling hot samples of sodium and potassium, Ospelkaus is able to study exotic phenomena such as hyperfine ro-vibrational electronic interactions. She first combines Zeeman slowing with two-dimensional magneto-optical trapping, and once the atoms are cooled below the Doppler limit, loads them into a magnetic quadrupole trap. At this stage, microwave evaporation cools the sodium, which results in the sympathetic cooling of potassium. At ≈ 10 μK, interactions between the sodium and magnesium become increasingly strong, and further cooling demands more sophisticated tools. These include magnetic Feshbach resonance.

Ospelkaus has demonstrated laser cooling to study diatomic molecules. She achieves this cooling using direct laser cooling and buffer gas cooling. Ultra-cold molecules are essentially stationary, which allows for their structure-property relationships to be studied at ultra-high precision. Dense gases of these molecules exhibit quantum behaviour, which allows for investigations into superconductivity.

Ospelkaus uses molecular spectroscopy to understand the quantum states of alkali metal – alkaline earth metal atomic gases. In 2022, she was awarded a European Research Council consolidator grant.

== Selected publications ==
- Kang-Kuen Ni; Silke Ospelkaus; M H G de Miranda; et al. (18 September 2008). "A high phase-space-density gas of polar molecules". Science. 322 (5899): 231–235. arXiv:0808.2963. doi:10.1126/science.1163861. ISSN 0036-8075. PMID 18801969. Wikidata Q33370512.
- Silke Ospelkaus; Kang-Kuen Ni; D Wang; et al. (1 February 2010). "Quantum-state controlled chemical reactions of ultracold potassium-rubidium molecules". Science. 327 (5967): 853–857. arXiv:0912.3854. doi:10.1126/science.1184121. ISSN 0036-8075. PMID 20150499. Wikidata Q59476983.
- Kang-Kuen Ni; Silke Ospelkaus; D Wang; et al. (1 April 2010). "Dipolar collisions of polar molecules in the quantum regime". Nature. 464 (7293): 1324–1328. arXiv:1001.2809. doi:10.1038/nature08953. ISSN 1476-4687. PMID 20428166. Wikidata Q59058301.
