= Brian L. DeMarco =

American physicist and professor

Brain L. Demarco
- Education: State University of New York at Geneseo; University of Colorado at Boulder (Ph.D.)
- Scientific career
- Fields: Physics
- Workplaces: University of Illinois at Urbana-Champaign
- Thesis: Quantum Behavior of an Atomic Fermi Gas (2001)
- Doctoral advisor: Deborah S. Jin
- Website: http://www.physics.uiuc.edu/People/DeMarco/

Brian Leeds DeMarco is a physicist and professor of physics at the University of Illinois at Urbana-Champaign. In 2005 he placed first in the quantum physics portion of the "Amazing Light" competition honoring Charles Townes, winner of the 1964 Nobel Prize in Physics. DeMarco is currently conducting experiments in quantum simulation.

DeMarco earned a bachelor's degree in physics from the State University of New York at Geneseo in 1996. He then earned a PhD in physics from the University of Colorado at Boulder in 2001. As a graduate student, DeMarco worked with Deborah S. Jin to create the first true Fermionic condensate. The journal Science selected this achievement as one of the top ten scientific discoveries of 1999.

From 2001 to 2003, DeMarco was a postdoctoral research fellow at the National Institute of Standards and Technology (Boulder), working on quantum computing experiments with trapped atomic ions. He joined the department of physics at the University of Illinois in 2003.

== Education ==
- Vestal Senior High School, Vestal NY Class of 1992
- SUNY Geneseo, Geneseo, NY Class of 1996
- University of Colorado at Boulder, Boulder, Colorado Ph.D. in Physics 2001

== Honors and awards ==
- Breakthrough of the Year, 1999 - Science magazine - Science 286, 2239-2243 (1999)
- JILA Scientific Achievement Award, 2000
- American Physical Society DAMOP Dissertation Award, 2002
- Office of Naval Research Young Investigator Program Award, 2004
- National Science Foundation CAREER Award, 2004
- 1st Place, "Quantum Physics" category, Amazing Light: Visions for Discovery, 2005
- Alfred P. Sloan Foundation Research Fellowship, 2006
- Beckman Fellow, 2006-2007
- Fellow of the American Physical Society, 2015

== Publications ==
- Demarco, B.; Lannert, C.; Vishveshwara, S.; Wei, T.-C. (2005). "Structure and stability of Mott-insulator shells of bosons trapped in an optical lattice". Physical Review A. 71 (6) 063601. arXiv:cond-mat/0501718. Bibcode:2005PhRvA..71f3601D. doi:10.1103/PhysRevA.71.063601. S2CID 119368663.
- White, M.; Gao, H.; Pasienski, M.; Demarco, B. (2006). "Bose-Einstein condensates in rf-dressed adiabatic potentials". Physical Review A. 74 (2) 023616. arXiv:cond-mat/0605393. Bibcode:2006PhRvA..74b3616W. doi:10.1103/PhysRevA.74.023616. S2CID 119478329.
- McKay, D.; White, M.; Pasienski, M.; Demarco, B. (2008). "Phase-slip-induced dissipation in an atomic Bose–Hubbard system". Nature. 453 (7191): 76–79. arXiv:0708.3074. Bibcode:2008Natur.453...76M. doi:10.1038/nature06920. PMID 18451857. S2CID 4429434.
- Pasienski, Matthew; Demarco, Brian (2008). "A high-accuracy algorithm for designing arbitrary holographic atom traps". Optics Express. 16 (3): 2176–90. arXiv:0712.0794. Bibcode:2008OExpr..16.2176P. doi:10.1364/OE.16.002176. PMID 18542298. S2CID 8514996.
- McKay, D.; White, M.; Pasienski, M.; Demarco, B. (2008). "Phase-slip-induced dissipation in an atomic Bose–Hubbard system". Nature. 453 (7191): 76–79. arXiv:0708.3074. Bibcode:2008Natur.453...76M. doi:10.1038/nature06920. PMID 18451857. S2CID 4429434.
