= William George Harter =

- Born: July 18, 1943 (age 83); Lancaster, Pennsylvania
- Scientific career
- Fields: Physics
- Workplaces: University of Arkansas

William George Harter (born July 18, 1943) is an American physicist at the University of Arkansas.

Harter was born in Lancaster, Pennsylvania and studied at Hiram College (AB, 1964) and the University of California, Irvine (Ph.D, 1967).

He was appointed assistant professor of physics at the University of Southern California, Los Angeles, (1969-1973) and associate professor at the University of Campinas, Sao Paulo, Brazil (1974-1977). He was visiting fellow at the Joint Institute for Laboratory Astrophysics at the University of Colorado, Boulder in 1977-1978 and professor at the Georgia Institute of Technology, Atlanta from 1979 to 1984, and the University of Arkansas, Fayetteville since 1985. He has also been visiting fellow at the Center for Astrophysics | Harvard & Smithsonian, Cambridge, Massachusetts from 1993.

He was awarded the status of Fellow in the American Physical Society, after they were nominated by their Division of Atomic, Molecular & Optical Physics in 1994, for the development of novel and semiclassical and graphical theories which contributed to better understanding, analysis and prediction of complex electronic spectra of atoms and molecules, and high resolution rotation-vibration of symmetric polyatomic molecules.

== See also ==
- List of fellows of the American Physical Society (1972–1997)
