= Balykin =

Balykin (Russian: Балыкин, from балык meaning balyk, dried and salted salmon) is a Russian masculine surname, its feminine counterpart is Balykina. It may refer to

- Ivan Balykin (born 1990), Russian racing cyclist
- Victor Balykin (born 1947), Russian physicist
- Yuliya Balykina (1984–2015), Belarusian sprinter
