= Cindy Regal =

American physicist and researcher

Cindy A. Regal
- Born: 1979 (age 46–47)
- Education: Lawrence University; University of Colorado
- Known for: BEC-BCS crossover in ultracold fermi gas; Quantum systems of interacting atoms, photons and phonons; Hybrid quantum systems
- Awards: Fellow, American Physical Society; Presidential Early Career Award for Scientists and Engineers; Packard Fellowship in Science and Engineering; Hertz Foundation Fellowship
- Scientific career
- Fields: Atomic, molecular, and optical physics; Cavity optomechanics; Condensed matter; Quantum optics
- Workplaces: University of Colorado; JILA
- Doctoral advisor: Deborah S. Jin

Cindy A. Regal is an American experimental physicist most noted for her work in quantum optics; atomic, molecular, and optical physics (AMO); and cavity optomechanics. Regal is an associate professor in the Department of Physics at the University of Colorado and JILA Fellow; and a Fellow of the American Physical Society (APS).

== Biography ==
Regal was raised in Duluth, Minnesota and attended Lawrence University. On a graduate fellowship to CU Boulder from the Hertz Foundation, Regal pioneered experimental techniques for ultracold Fermi gases under the supervision of Deborah S. Jin. Her PhD thesis, which showed a crossover between Bose-Einstein condensation and superconductivity using an ultracold gas of atomic fermions, was awarded the APS Division of AMO Physics (DAMOP) thesis prize in 2007.

After, Regal worked with Dr. Konrad Lehnert at JILA to establish a novel platform for studying the nanomechanics of a beam capacitively coupled a superconducting transmission-line microwave cavity, which achieved a displacement imprecision of 30 times the standard quantum limit. Her postdoc in the group of Prof. H. Jeff Kimble at Caltech resulted in another novel experimental system for exploring cavity optomechanics, this time using optically levitated nanoparticles. Regal returned to CU Boulder as an assistant professor in physics in January 2010 and became the university's first Clare Booth Luce Professor.

The Regal Laboratory studies experimental quantum systems of interacting atoms, photons and phonons. Regal has described this work as seeking “to engineer and explore new quantum systems with controlled connections for quantum information and quantum optics”. This highly interdisciplinary research has been recognized by the Packard Foundation in 2011 and the Barack Obama Administration with a Presidential Early Career Award for Scientists and Engineers in 2012.

== Honors and awards ==
- Fellow, American Physical Society, 2017
- Presidential Early Career Award for Scientists and Engineers (PECASE), 2012
- Packard Fellowship in Science and Engineering, 2011
- Hertz Foundation doctoral thesis prize winner, 2007
- APS Division of AMO Physics (DAMOP) thesis prize winner, 2007
- Hertz Foundation Fellowship for graduate studies in the physical sciences, 2001-2006

== External media ==
- Prospects for a quantum electro-optic interface via micromechanical motion, IQOQI Colloquium Sept, 2017
