= Kang-Kuen Ni =

American physical chemist

Kang-Kuen Ni is a Taiwanese and American physical chemist who is the Theodore William Richards Professor of Chemistry at Harvard University, where she is also a professor of physics. Her research uses optical tweezers to study ultracold atoms and ultracold molecules, phases of matter in the ultracold regime where effects from quantum mechanics predominate, chemical reactions at the single-molecule scale, and the use of ultracold molecules as components in quantum computing.

== Education and career ==
Ni is originally from Taiwan, where she was a student at the National Experimental High School at the Hsinchu Science Park. After high school, she continued her education in the United States, graduating from the University of California, Santa Barbara in 2003. She completed a Ph.D. in physics at the University of Colorado Boulder in 2009; her dissertation, A quantum gas of polar molecules, was supervised by Deborah S. Jin.

After research at the California Institute of Technology from 2009 to 2011 as a Center for Physics of Information Postdoctoral Fellow, advised by H. Jeff Kimble, and at JILA in Colorado from 2011 to 2013 as a National Research Council Postdoctoral Fellow, advised by Eric Allin Cornell, she joined the Harvard faculty as an assistant professor in 2013. She was named as Morris Kahn Associate Professor in 2019, without tenure, and tenured as a full professor (as is the standard at Harvard) in 2021.

== Recognition ==
Ni was the 2010 recipient of the Thesis Prize of the American Physical Society Division of Atomic, Molecular & Optical Physics, later renamed after her advisor as the Deborah Jin Award for Outstanding Doctoral Thesis Research in Atomic, Molecular, or Optical Physics.

She was the 2019 recipient of the I. I. Rabi Prize, a biennial prize of the American Physical Society, given "for seminal work on ultracold molecules, including original contributions to the understanding of chemical reactions in the quantum regime, deterministic creation of individual molecules with optical tweezers, and development of novel, high-precision techniques to interrogate and control the complete set of internal molecular resources".

She was one of the 2023 recipients of the New Horizons in Physics Prize, given to her and a group of her coauthors "for the development of optical tweezer arrays to realize control of individual atoms for applications in quantum information science, metrology, and molecular physics".
