= Anti-Stokes cooling =

Anti-Stokes cooling allows laser cooling to be applied to macroscopic samples. The idea for anti-Stokes cooling was first advanced by Peter Pringsheim in 1929. While Doppler cooling lowers the translational temperature of a sample, anti-Stokes cooling decreases the vibrational or phonon excitation of a medium. This is accomplished by pumping a substance with a laser beam from a low-lying energy state to a higher one with subsequent emission to an even lower-lying energy state.

The principal condition for efficient cooling is that the anti-Stokes emission rate to the final state be significantly larger than that to other states as well as the nonradiative relaxation rate. Because vibrational or phonon energy can be many orders of magnitude larger than the energy associated with Doppler broadening, the efficiency of heat removal per laser photon expended for anti-Stokes cooling can be correspondingly larger than that for Doppler cooling.

== History ==
The anti-Stokes cooling effect was first demonstrated by Djeu and Whitney in CO_{2} gas. The first anti-Stokes cooling in a solid was demonstrated by Epstein et al. in 1995, in a ytterbium doped fluoride glass sample. In 1999, Gosnell et al. cooled a fiber of ytterbium-doped fluoride glass (Yb:ZBLAN) to 236 K. Subsequently in 2005, the same solid was further cooled to 208 K. In 2010, cooling to a cryogenic temperature 155 K was achieved in a LiYF_{4} crystal. In 2013, Melgaard et al. cooled Yb:YLF to 119 K. The lowest temperature achieved by anti-Stokes cooling, 90 K, was demonstrated in 2017 by Gragossian et al. in Yb:YLF by using a multipass Herriott cell to compensate for the small absorption probability of the material by giving a photon many opportunities to be absorbed before leaving the experiment.

== Applications ==
Potential practical applications for anti-Stokes cooling of solids include radiation balanced solid state lasers and vibration-free optical refrigeration, useful in applications like space-based optics where cryogens would carry a significant weight and complexity penalty.
