= Victor Balykin =

Russian physicist (born 1947)

Victor I. Balykin
- Born: 1 January 1947 (age 79); Ryazan, USSR
- Education: Moscow Institute of Physics and Technology
- Scientific career
- Fields: Physics
- Workplaces: Institute for Spectroscopy
- Website: www.atomoptics.ru

Victor Ivanovich Balykin (born 1 January 1947) is a Russian physicist whose main contributions are in the field of atom optics. He and his associates first demonstrated laser cooling of neutral atoms in 1981.

== Biography ==
Balykin was born on January 1, 1947. He graduated from Moscow Institute of Physics and Technology and received his PhD in Institute for Spectroscopy under Vladilen Letokhov. Balykin initiated a research team at Institute of Spectroscopy, involved in work on laser spectroscopy and quantum optics, in particular laser fluorescence detection of single atom, laser cooling and trapping of neutral atoms, atom optics, nanooptics and nanoplasmonics. In 1981 Balykin, Letokohv and Vladimir Minogin and his associates first demonstrated laser cooling of neutral atoms. From 1989 to 1990 he was a research fellow of Alexander von Humboldt Foundation in Max Planck Institute for Nuclear Physics and Heidelberg University, Germany where he and his colleagues first demonstrated laser cooling of relativistic ion beam. From 1990 to 1993 Balykin was senior researcher at University of Konstanz, Department of Physics, Germany. In 1996 - 1997 he held the position of professor of University of Electro-Communication, Department of Physics, Tokyo, Japan. Presently Balykin is head of Laser Spectroscopy Laboratory, Institute for Spectroscopy, Russia.

== Major publications ==
Victor Balykin has published more than 100 scientific papers.

- "Laser detection of single atom fluorescence", V.I. Balykin, V.S. Letokhov, V.I. Mishin and V.A. Semchishen, JETP Lett., 26, 492–495, 1977.
- "Laser detection of single atoms", V.I. Balykin, G.I. Bekov, V.I. Mishin, and V.S.Letokhov, Sov. Phys. Usp., 23, 651–678, 1980.
- "Radiative slowing and reduction of the energy spread of a beam of sodium atoms to 1.5 K in an oppositely directed laser beam", S.V. Andreev, V.I. Balykin, V.S. Letokhov, and V.G. Minogin, JETP Lett., 34, 442–445, 1981.
- "Radiative collimation of an atomic beam by two-dimensional cooling by laser beam", V.I. Balykin, V.S. Letokhov, and A.I. Sidorov, JETP Lett., 40, 1026–1029, 1984.
- "Cooling atoms by means of laser radiation pressure", V.I. Balykin, V.S. Letokhov, V.G. Minogin, Sov. Phys. Usp., 28, 803–826, 1985.
- "The possibility of deep laser focusing of an atom beam into the Angstrom region", V.I. Balykin, V.S. Letokhov, Opt. Commun., 64, 151–156, 1987.
- "Focusing of an atomic beam and imaging of atomic sources by means of a laser lens based on resonance-radiation pressure", V.I. Balykin, V.S. Letokhov, Yu.B. Ovchinnikov, and A.I. Sidorov, Journ. Mod. Opt., 35, 17–34, 1988.
- "Quantum state-selective reflection of atoms by laser light", V.I. Balykin, V.S. Letokhov, Yu. B. Ovchinnikov, and A.I. Sidorov, Phys. Rev. Lett., 60, 2137–2140, 1988.
- "Laser control of the motion of neutral atoms and optical atomic traps", V.I.Balykin, V.S.Letokhov, V.G.Minogin, Physica Scripta, V.22, T.2, 119–127, 1988.
- "Atomic cavity with light induced mirrors", V.I. Balykin and V.S. Letokhov, Appl. Phys. B, 48, 517–523, 1989.
- "Laser optics of neutral atomic beam", V.I. Balykin and V.S. Letokhov, Physics Today, 4, 23-28 (1989)
- "First laser cooling of relativistic ions in storage ring", S. Schroder, R. Klein, N. Boos, M. Gerhard, R. Grieser, G. Huber, A. Karafillidis, M. Krieg, T, Kuhl, R. Nemann, V.Balykin, et al., Phys. Rev. Lett., 64, 2901–2904, 1990.
- "An atomic trap based on evanescent light wave", Yu. B. Ovchinnikov, S.V. Shulga, and V.I. Balykin, J.Phys. B: At.Mol.Opt.Phys., 24, 3173–3178, 1991.
- "Imaging and focusing of an atomic-beam with a large period standing light-wave", Sleator T., Pfau T., Balykin V., et al. Appl. Phys.B, 54, 375, 1992.
- "Experimental demonstration of the optical Stern-Gerlach effect", Sleator T. Pfau T., Balykin V., J. Mlynek, Phys. Rev. Lett., 68, 1996–1999, 1992.
- "Laser near-field lens for atoms", Balykin V.I., Klimov V.V., Letokhov V.S., J Phys II 4, 1981, 1994.
- "Reflection of metastable argon atoms from an evanescent-wave", Seifert, W, Adams, C.S., Balykin V.I., et al. Phys RevA, 49, 3814, 1994.
- "Inelastic reflection of atoms from an evanescent light wave", Yu. B. Ovchinnikov, D. V. Laryushin, V.I. Balykin, V. S. Letokhov, Laser Physics, 6, 264–267, 1995.
- "Atom optics with laser light", V.I. Balykin and V.S. Letokhov, Laser Science and Technology, Gordon & Breach, Vol. 18, 1995.
- "A bright coherent source of de Broglie wave", V.I. Balykin, D. V. Laryushin, M. V. Subbotin, V. S. Letokhov, Laser Physics, 7, 358–360, 1997.
- "Information cooling of neutral atoms", V. I. Balykin, V. S. Letokhov, Phys. Rev.A, 64, 063410, 2001.
- "Atomic-matter-wave scanner", H. Oberst, Sh. Kasashima, V. I. Balykin, and F. Shimizu, Phys. Rev. A, 68, 013606, 2003.
- "Atom Nanooptics Based on Photon Dots and Photon Holes", V. I. Balykin, V. V. Klimov, and V. S. Letokhov, JETP Lett., 78, 8, 2003.
- "Atomic Nanoprobe with a Single Photon", V. I. Balykin, JETP Lett., 78, 408, 2003.
- "Atom trap and waveguide using a two-color evanescent light field around a subwavelength-diameter optical fiber", Fam Le Kien, V. I. Balykin, and K. Hakuta, Phys. Rev. A, 70, 063403 (2004).
- "Spontaneous emission of a cesium atom near a nanofiber: Efficient coupling of light to guided modes", Fam Le Kien, S. Dutta Gupta, V. I. Balykin, and K. Hakuta, Phys. Rev. A, 72, 032509, 2005.
- "State-insensitive trapping and guiding of cesium atoms using a two-color evanescent field around a subwavelength-diameter fiber", Fam Le Kien, V. I. Balykin and K. Hakuta, J. Phys. Soc. Jpn, 74, 910, 2005.
- "Motion of an Atom under the Effect of Femtosecond Laser Pulses: From Chaos to Spatial Localization", V. I. Balykin, JETP Letters, 81, 209–213, 2005.
- "Light-induced force and torque on an atom outside a nanofiber", Fam Le Kien, V. I. Balykin, and K. Hakuta, Phys. Rev. A, 74, 033412, 2006.
- "Angular momentum of light in an optical nanofiber", Fam Le Kien, V. I. Balykin, and K. Hakuta, Phys. Rev. A, 73, 053823 (2006).
- "Atom Nanooptics", V.I. Balykin, V.V. Klimov, V.S.Letokhov. In "Handbook of Theoretical and Computational Nanotechnology" 2006.
- "Optical nanofiber as an efficient tool for manipulating and probing atomic fluorescence", K. P. Nayak, P. N. Melentiev, M. Morinaga, Fam Le Kien, V. I. Balykin, and K. Hakuta, Optics Express, 15, 5431–5438, 2007
- "Parallel fabrication of nanostructures via atom projection", V.I. Balykin, Physics Uspekhi, 50, (7) 744, 2007.
- "Laser-Induced Quantum Adsorption of Atoms on a Surface", A. E. Afanasiev, P. N. Melentiev, and V. I. Balykin, JETP Letters, 86, 172–177, 2007.
- "Nanolithography based on an atom pinhole camer", P N Melentiev, A V Zablotskiy, D.A. Lapshin, E P Sheshin, A S Baturin and V I Balykin, Nanotechnology, 20, 235301, 2009.
- "Nanolithography based on an atom pinhole camera for fabrication of metamaterials", P.N.Melentiev, A.V.Zablotskiy, V.I. Balykin, A.A.Kuzin, D.A.Lapshin, A.S.Baturin, Metamaterials, 3, 157–164, 2009.
- "Atomic diffraction microscope of the de Broglie waves", V.I. Balykin, Laser Physics, 20, 47–51, 2010
