= Deborah S. Jin =

American physicist

- 金秀兰
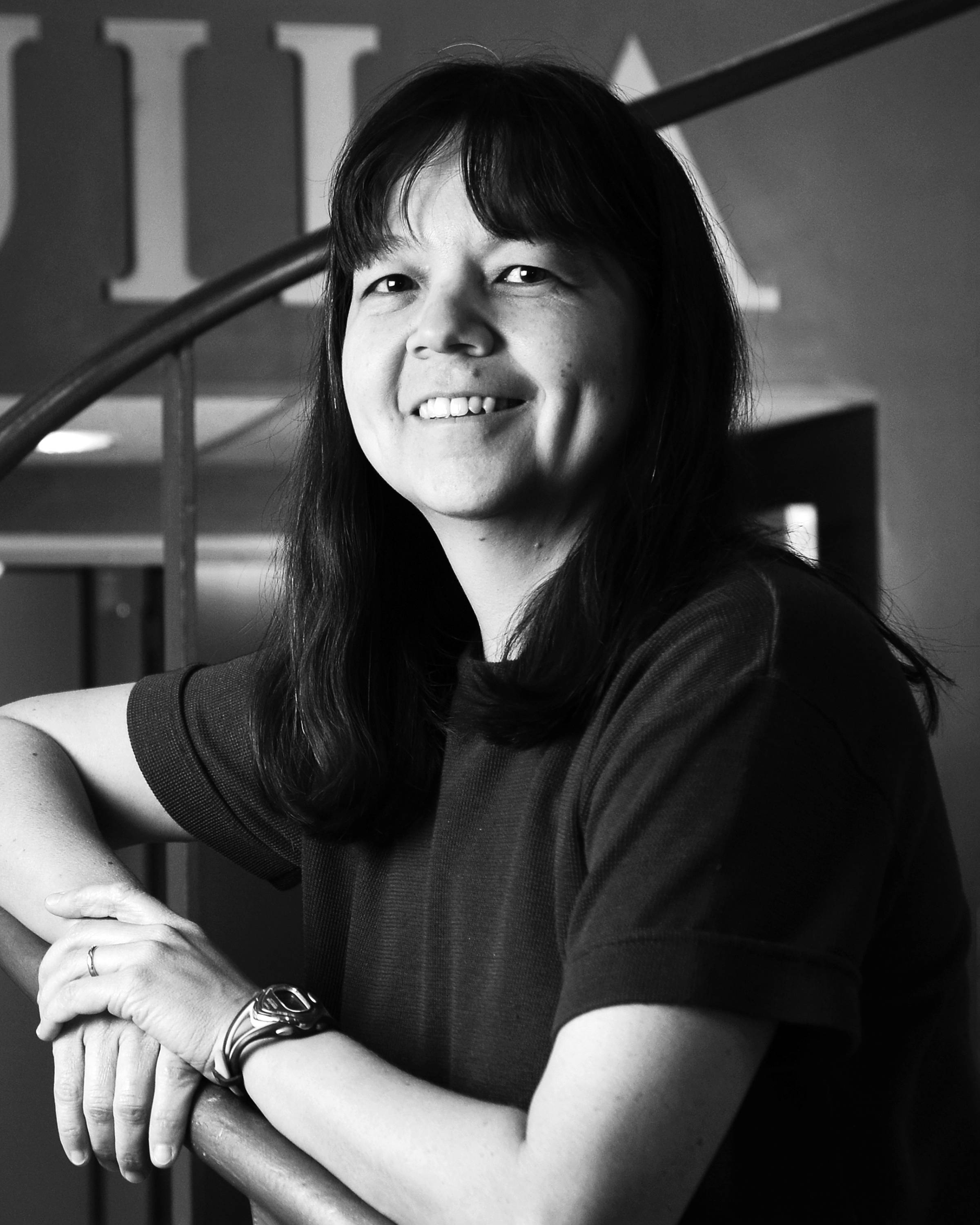
- Born: November 15, 1968; Stanford, California, U.S.
- Died: September 15, 2016 (aged 47); Boulder, Colorado, U.S.
- Education: Princeton University (BA); University of Chicago (PhD)
- Known for: fermionic condensate
- Awards: MacArthur Fellowship (2003); Benjamin Franklin Medal (2008); Isaac Newton Medal (2014)
- Scientific career
- Fields: Physics
- Workplaces: National Institute of Standards and Technology; University of Colorado at Boulder
- Thesis: Experimental study of the phase diagrams of heavy fermion superconductors with multiple transitions (1995)
- Doctoral advisor: Thomas F. Rosenbaum
- Doctoral students: Brian L. DeMarco; Kang-Kuen Ni; Cindy Regal
- Website: Lab website (archived)

Deborah Shiu-lan Jin (Chinese: 金秀兰; pinyin: Jīn Xiùlán; November 15, 1968 – September 15, 2016) was an American physicist and fellow with the National Institute of Standards and Technology (NIST); Professor Adjunct, Department of Physics at the University of Colorado; and a fellow of the JILA, a NIST joint laboratory with the University of Colorado.

She was considered a pioneer in polar molecular quantum chemistry. From 1995 to 1997 she worked with Eric Cornell and Carl Wieman at JILA, where she was involved in some of the earliest studies of dilute gas Bose-Einstein condensates. In 2003 Jin's team at JILA made the first fermionic condensate, a new form of matter. She used magnetic traps and lasers to cool fermionic atomic gases to less than 100 billionths of a degree above zero, successfully demonstrating quantum degeneracy and the formation of a molecular Bose-Einstein condensate. Jin was frequently mentioned as a strong candidate for the Nobel Prize in Physics. In 2002, Discover magazine recognized her as one of the 50 most important women in science.

== Biography ==
=== Early life ===
Jin was born in Santa Clara County, California, Jin was one of three children, and grew up in Indian Harbour Beach, Florida. Her father was a physicist and her mother a physicist working as an engineer. Her father Ron Jin was born in Fuzhou in 1933 and died in 2010.

=== Education ===
Jin graduated magna cum laude from Princeton University in 1990, receiving a Bachelor of Arts in physics after completing a senior thesis titled "A Condensation-Pumped Dilution Refrigerator for Use in Cooling Millimeter Wave Bolometer Detectors". She was a recipient of the Allen G. Shenstone Prize in Physics in 1990.

Jin then studied at the University of Chicago, where she was a NSF Graduate Fellow from 1990 to 1993 and received a Ph.D. in physics in 1995, completing a doctoral thesis titled "Experimental Study of the Phase Diagrams of Heavy Fermion Superconductors with Multiple Transitions" under the supervision of Thomas Felix Rosenbaum.

=== Scientific contributions ===
After completing her Ph.D., Jin joined Eric Cornell's group at JILA, the Joint Institute for Laboratory Astrophysics in Boulder, Colorado, as a postdoctoral researcher. This change from condensed matter to atomic physics required her to learn a new set of experimental techniques. Jin joined Cornell's group soon after they achieved the first rubidium Bose-Einstein condensate (BEC), and performed experiments characterizing its properties.

In 1997, Jin formed her own group at JILA. Within two years, she developed the ability to create the first quantum degenerate gas of fermionic atoms. The work was motivated by earlier studies of BEC's and the ability to cool a dilute gas of atoms to 1 μK. The weak interactions between particles in a BEC led to interesting physics. It was theorized that fermionic atoms would form an analogous state at low enough temperatures, with fermions pairing up in a phenomenon similar to the creation of Cooper pairs in superconducting materials.

The work was complicated by the fact that, unlike bosons, fermions cannot occupy the same quantum state at the same time, due to the Pauli exclusion principle, and are therefore limited with regard to cooling mechanisms. At low enough temperature evaporative cooling, an important technique used to reach low enough temperature to create the first BEC's, is no longer effective for fermions. To circumvent this issue, Jin and her team cooled potassium-40 atoms in two different magnetic sublevels. This enabled atoms in different sublevels to collide with each other, restoring the efficacy of evaporative cooling. Using this technique, Jin and her group were able to produce a degenerate Fermi gas at a temperature of about 300 nK, or half the Fermi temperature of the mixture.

In 2003, Jin and her team were the first to condense pairs of fermionic atoms. They directly observed a molecular Bose-Einstein condensate created solely by adjusting the interaction strength in an ultracold Fermi gas of atoms using a Feshbach resonance. She was able to observe transitions of the gas between a Bardeen-Cooper-Schrieffer (BCS) state and Bose-Einstein condensate.

In 2008, Jin and her team developed a technique analogous to angle-resolved photoemission spectroscopy (ARPES) which allowed them to measure excitations of their degenerate gas with both energy- and momentum-resolution. They used this approach to study the nature of fermion pairing across the BCS-BEC crossover, the same system her group had first explored in 2003. These experiments provided the first experimental evidence of a pseudogap in the BCS-BEC crossover.

Jin continued to advance the frontiers of ultracold science when she and her colleague, Jun Ye, managed to cool polar molecules that possess a large electric dipole moment to ultracold temperatures, also in 2008. Rather than directly cool polar molecules, they created a gas of ultracold atoms and then transformed them into dipolar molecules in a coherent way. This work led to novel insights regarding the chemical reactions near absolute zero. They were able to observe and control potassium-rubidium (KRb) molecules in the lowest energy state (ground state). They were even able to observe molecules colliding and breaking and forming chemical bonds. Jin's husband, John Bohn, who specialized in the theory of ultracold atomic collisions, collaborated with her on this work.

== Honors and awards ==
Jin was an elected member of the National Academy of Sciences (2005) and Fellow of the American Academy of Arts and Sciences (2007).

Jin won a number of prestigious awards, including:

- 2000, Presidential Early Career Award in Science and Engineering
- 2001, NIST Samuel W. Stratton Award
- 2002, Maria Goeppert-Mayer Award
- 2002, National Academy of Sciences Award for Initiatives in Research
- 2003, MacArthur Fellowship "genius grant"
- 2003, Arthur S. Flemming Award (Scientific Category)
- 2004, Service to America Medal: Science and the Environment
- 2004, Scientific American's "Research Leader of the Year"
- 2005, American Physical Society, I.I. Rabi Prize
- 2006, Bonfils-Stanton Foundation Award in Science and Medicine
- 2008, The Benjamin Franklin Medal in Physics
- 2009, Sigma Xi, The William Proctor Prize for Scientific Achievement
- 2011, Gold Medal, NIST, Department of Commerce
- 2013, L'Oréal-UNESCO For Women in Science Award Laureate for North America
- 2014, The Institute of Physics Isaac Newton Medal
- 2014, Comstock Prize in Physics, "for a recent innovative discovery or investigation in electricity, magnetism, or radiant energy."
- 2014, "Most Influential Scientific Minds of 2014," with Jun Ye, released from Thomson Reuters

After she died the American Physical Society renamed its DAMOP graduate student prize after Deborah Jin to acknowledge her impact in the field of atomic, molecular, and optical physics.

== Personal life ==
Jin married John Bohn, and had a daughter. Jin died of cancer on September 15, 2016, in Boulder, Colorado.
