= Chad Orzel =

Professor of Physics and Science Author

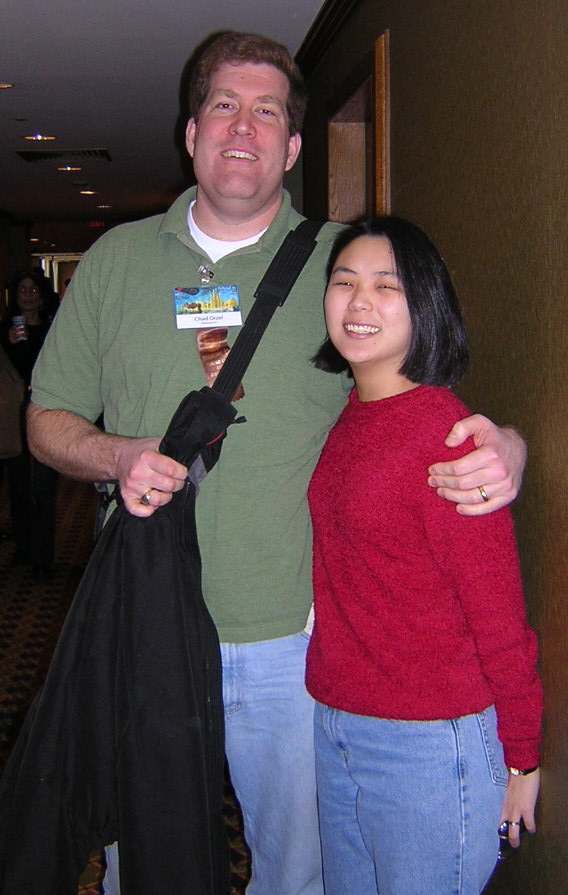
- Chad Orzel & Kate Nepveu, 2006
- Education: Williams College; University of Maryland, College Park
- Spouse: Kate Nepveu
- Children: 2 Children
- Scientific career
- Fields: Atomic, molecular, and optical physics
- Workplaces: Union College
- Website: chadorzel.com

Chad Orzel is a professor of physics and science author, noted for his books How to Teach Quantum Physics to Your Dog, which has been translated into 9 languages, and How to Teach Relativity to Your Dog. Chad as a science communicator is a regular contributor on Forbes.com, on his personal website, and, through October 2017, on ScienceBlogs.com, while continuing his work as an associate professor at Union College.

== Background ==
Chad was born and raised in central New York state, near Binghamton. After attending Williams College, he spent two years as a post-doctoral researcher at Yale University, studying quantum mechanical effects in Bose-Einstein condensates. He received his Ph.D. in chemical physics studying laser cooling at the National Institute of Standards and Technology from the University of Maryland, College Park under Nobel Laureate William Daniel Phillips. He is an associate professor in the Department of Physics and Astronomy at Union College in Schenectady, NY where he specializes in atomic, molecular, and optical physics. Orzel had a blog at Uncertain Principles and has made web based presentations including a number of TED ED Talks. He was named a Fellow of the American Physical Society in 2021.

== Writing career ==
In addition to teaching and doing research at Union, he maintained the physics-oriented blog Uncertain Principles as part of the ScienceBlogs project. He published his first book, How to Teach Quantum Physics to Your Dog (also called How to Teach Physics to Your Dog) in 2009. The book and its sequel How to Teach Relativity to Your Dog explain scientific concepts using a fictionalized version of Orzel's dog as an audience surrogate. In 2018, he published Breakfast with Einstein (The Exotic Physics of Everyday Objects. In 2022, he published A Brief History of Timekeeping.

== Personal life ==
He lives in Niskayuna, New York with his wife, Kate Nepveu, their two children. Emmy, the dog which was the sound board of exploring physics in his popular books How to Teach Quantum Physics to Your Dog"and How to Teach Relativity to Your Dog has died but he introduces a new addition to the family by way of his blog in an entry entitled "Meet Charlie", another rescue dog.

== Publications ==
- How to Teach Quantum Physics to Your Dog (Scribner, 2009) ISBN 9781416572299
- How to Teach Relativity to Your Dog (Basic Books, 2012) ISBN 978-0465023318
- Eureka! Discovering Your Inner Scientist (Basic Books, 2014) ISBN 9788434422315
- Breakfast with Einstein: The Exotic Physics of Everyday Objects (BenBella Books, 2018) ISBN 9781946885357
- "Scientific Failure as a Public Good: Illustrating the Process of Science and Its Contrast with Pseudoscience" (doi:10.7551/mitpress/9780262037426.001.0001) in Pseudoscience: The Conspiracy Against Science, edited by Allison B. Kaufman and James C. Kaufman (MIT Press, 2018) ISBN 9780262037426
- A Brief History of Timekeeping (BenBella Books, 2022) ISBN 9781953295606
