= William Daniel Phillips =

American physicist (born 1948)

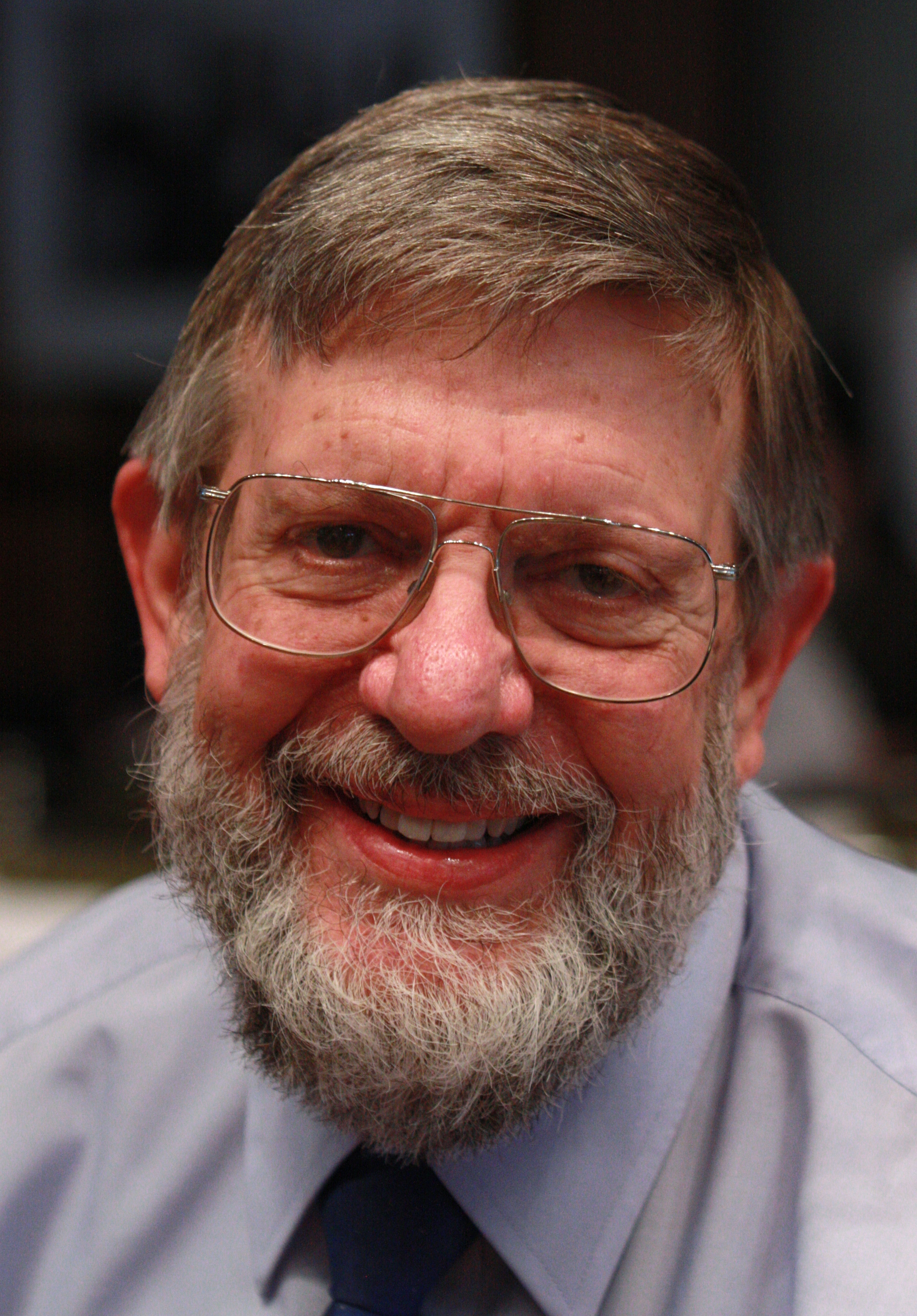
- Phillips at the 2012 Lindau Nobel Laureate Meeting
- Born: November 5, 1948 (age 78); Wilkes-Barre, Pennsylvania, U.S.
- Education: Juniata College; Massachusetts Institute of Technology
- Known for: Laser cooling
- Awards: Nobel Prize in Physics (1997)
- Scientific career
- Fields: Physics
- Workplaces: NIST; University of Maryland, College Park
- Doctoral advisor: Daniel Kleppner

William Daniel Phillips (born November 5, 1948) is an American physicist. He shared the Nobel Prize in Physics in 1997 with Steven Chu and Claude Cohen-Tannoudji "for development of methods to cool and trap atoms with laser light."

== Biography ==
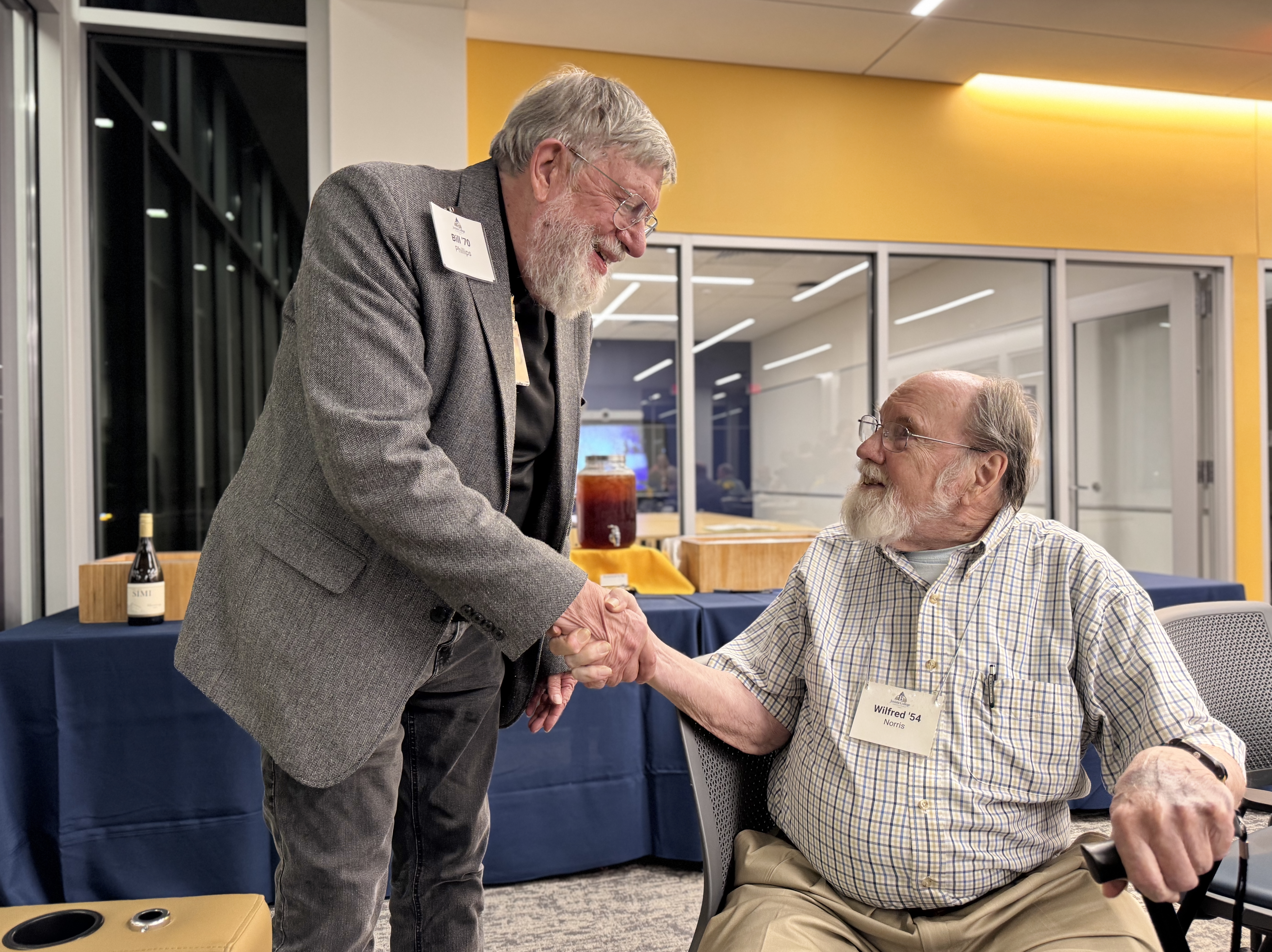
Bill Phillips greets his college physics professor, Dr. Wilfred Norris, in 2025—55 years after graduation.

Phillips was born on November 5, 1948, in Wilkes-Barre, Pennsylvania, to William Cornelius Phillips of Juniata, Pennsylvania, and Mary Catherine Savino of Ripacandida, Italy. He is of Italian and Albanian descent on his mother's side and of Welsh descent on his father's side. His parents moved to Camp Hill (near Harrisburg, Pennsylvania) in 1959, where he attended high school and graduated valedictorian of his class in 1966. He graduated from Juniata College in 1970 summa cum laude. After that he received his physics doctorate from the Massachusetts Institute of Technology. In 1978, he joined National Bureau of Standards (currently NIST).

In 1996, he received the Albert A. Michelson Medal from the Franklin Institute.

Phillips's doctoral thesis concerned the magnetic moment of the proton in H_{2}O. He later did some work with Bose–Einstein condensates. In 1997 he won the Nobel Prize in Physics together with Claude Cohen-Tannoudji and Steven Chu for his contributions to laser cooling, a technique to slow the movement of gaseous atoms in order to better study them, at the National Institute of Standards and Technology, and especially for his invention of the Zeeman slower.

Phillips is also a professor of physics, which is part of the University of Maryland College of Computer, Mathematical, and Natural Sciences at University of Maryland, College Park.

Phillips is one of the 20 American recipients of the Nobel Prize in Physics to sign a letter addressed to President George W. Bush in May 2008, urging him to "reverse the damage done to basic science research in the Fiscal Year 2008 Omnibus Appropriations Bill" by requesting additional emergency funding for the Department of Energy's Office of Science, the National Science Foundation, and the National Institute of Standards and Technology.

He was one of the 35 Nobel laureates who signed a letter urging President Obama to provide a stable $15 billion per year support for clean energy research, technology and demonstration.

He is one of three well-known scientists and Methodist laity who have involved themselves in the religion and science dialogue. The other two scientists and fellow Methodists are chemist Charles Coulson and 1981 Nobel laureate Arthur Leonard Schawlow.

In October 2010, Phillips participated in the USA Science and Engineering Festival's lunch with a laureate program where middle and high school students got to engage in an informal conversation with a Nobel Prize-winning scientist over a brown-bag lunch. Phillips is also a member of the USA Science and Engineering Festival's advisory board.

Phillips has served as a member, and later as an associated member, on the Commission on Symbols, Units, Nomenclature, Atomic Masses and Fundamental Constants (C2) of the International Union of Pure and Applied Physics from 2011 to 2024.

== Awards and honors ==
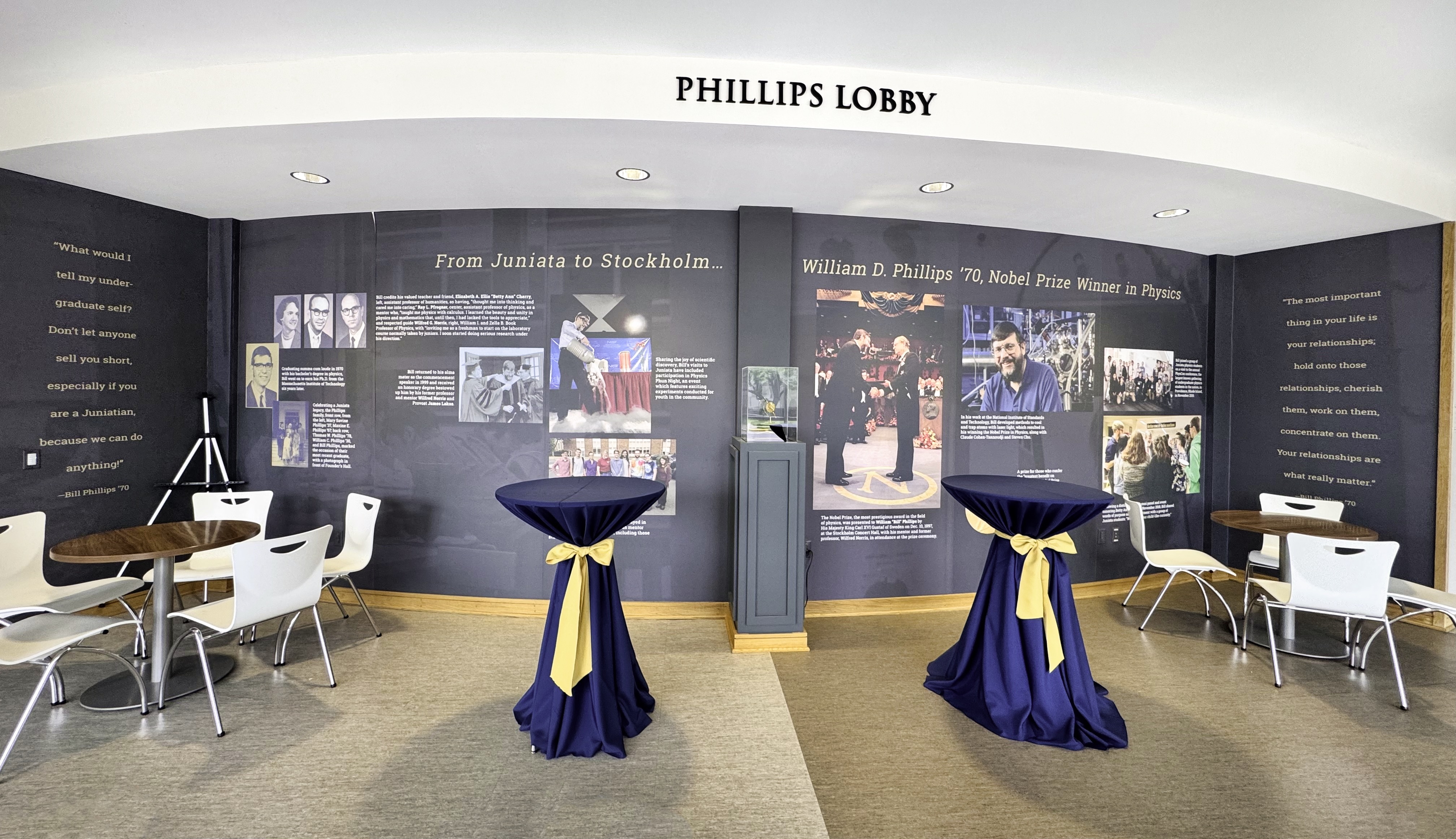
The Phillips Lobby at Juniata College in Huntingdon, Pennsylvania

Phillips has been awarded numerous honors.

- Outstanding Young Scientist Award of the Maryland Academy of Sciences, 1982
- Silver Medal of the Department of Commerce, 1983
- Samuel Wesley Stratton Award of the National Bureau of Standards, 1987
- Arthur S. Flemming Award of the Washington Downtown Jaycees, 1988
- Gold Medal of the Dept. of Commerce, 1993
- Elected Fellow of The Optical Society, 1994
- Election to American Academy of Arts and Sciences 1995
- Election as a NIST Fellow, 1995
- Michelson Medal of the Franklin Institute 1996
- Election to the National Academy of Sciences 1997
- Nobel Prize in Physics 1997
- Arthur L. Schawlow Prize in Laser Science (APS) 1998
- Golden Plate Award of the American Academy of Achievement 1999
- Richtmeyer Award of the Am. Assoc. of Physics Teachers 2000
- Election to the European Academy of Arts, Sciences and Humanities (titular member), 2000
- Appointed an Academician of the Pontifical Academy of Sciences 2004
- Elected Honorary Member of The Optical Society in 2004
- Presidential Rank Award, 2005
- Service to America Award – Career Achievement 2006
- Honorary Liveryman of the Worshipful Company of Scientific Instrument Makers
