= Institute for Spectroscopy Russian Academy of Sciences =

Research institution in Moscow, Russia

Institute for Spectroscopy RAS
- ISAN Main Building, 2010
- Abbreviation: ISAN, ISAS, IS RAS
- Formation: 1968
- Location: Troitsk, Moscow, Russia
- Coordinates: 55.464596°N 37.297538°E
- Official language: Russian, English
- Director: Prof. Dr. Viktor Zadkov
- Main organ: Scientific Council
- Parent organization: Russian Academy of Sciences
- Staff: 239
- Website: http://www.isan.troitsk.ru

The Institute of Spectroscopy Russian Academy of Sciences (ISAN) (in some sources the abbreviation used is ISAS, IS RAS) is a Russian research institution located in Troitsk, Moscow

At present (2010) ISAN has eight research departments, which activity covers practically all kinds of spectroscopies: atomic, molecular, plasma, gases, liquids, condensed matter, amorphous solids, glasses, crystals, nanostructures, polymers, biological systems. The available equipment allows for measurements in a broad spectral range; with ultimate spectral, spatial and temporal resolutions; in a broad range of temperatures and measurement times; with application of external fields.

ISAN educational activity includes a program for Diploma Students, Ph.D. and Doctorals for science, R&D and industry. The "Chair of Nanooptics and Spectroscopy" of Moscow Institute of Physics and Technology and the "Chair of Quantum Optics and Photonics" at the National Research University Higher School of Economics (HSE) are based at ISAN.

Institute of Spectroscopy is co-founder of EU Virtual Institute of Nano-Films

== History ==
Institute of Spectroscopy of Russian Academy of Sciences (ISAN) ( before 1991 - Institute of Spectroscopy of Soviet Union Academy of Sciences) was founded in 1968 on the basis of laboratory of Spectroscopy Committee of Soviet Union Academy of Sciences. Initial goals of the laboratory included the support of scientific and organizational activities of the Spectroscopy Committee, work on a number of technical problems, training of staff, etc. The laboratory has become the place of full-scale research focused on spectral instrument making and implementation of atomic and molecular spectroscopy in national economy. On 10 November 1967 Presidium of Academy of Sciences of USSR approved a resolution to reorganize the laboratory of Spectroscopy Committee into an Institute for Spectroscopy AS USSR to form a USSR head body in the field of spectroscopy.

Soon after that, the Government Committee for Science and Technology gave consent to create an institute and on 29 November 1968, Presidium AS USSR decided to reorganize the Laboratory into an institute. Construction of the Institute building was planned to take place in the Krasnaya Pakhra Scientific Centre, which was being developed at the time and already included the Pushkov Institute of Terrestrial Magnetism, Ionosphere and Radio Wave Propagation and Institute for High Pressure Physics.

Dr. Prof. Sergey Leonidovich Mandelstam (later, a corresponding member of RAS) was the first director and ideologist of scientific research areas of ISAN. Core staff was formed by the former members of Spectroscopy Committee lab: S.A. Uholin, Kh.E. Sterin, G.N. Zhizhin, V.B. Belyanin, Ya. M. Kimelfeld, E.Ya. Kononov, M.R. Aliev, S.N. Murzin. The following researchers have moved to ISAN from Lebedev Physical Institute: V.G. Koloshnikov, B.D. Osipov, V.S. Letoknov, R.V. Ambartsumyan, O.N. Kompanets, O.A. Tumanov. V.M. Agranovich moved to ISAN from Obninsk, R.I. Personov - from Moscow State Pedagogical University. S.G. Rautian worked in ISAN since 1971 to 1977.

According to Mandelstam's concept, staff of ISAN should not exceed three-four hundred in number. Laboratories of only a handful of researchers made it possible to flexibly change the directions of research and to focus on scientific work instead of administrative concerns. Today, staff of ISAN numbers to 239 employees, including 113 scientists of which 30 are Doctors of Science and 45 are postdocs.

== Structure ==
=== Directorial board ===
- Director (since 2015) - Prof. Dr. Victor Zadkov
- Scientific vice-director - Prof. Dr. Leonid Surin
- Scientific Secretary - Dr. E.B.Perminov
- Financial vice-director - A.Yu.Plodukhin

=== Scientific departments ===
- Atomic Spectroscopy Dept. (head - Prof. Dr. A.N.Rybtsev)
- Molecular Spectroscopy Dept. (head - Prof. Dr. L.A.Surin)
- Solid State Spectroscopy Dept. (head - Professor of the Russian Academy of Sciences, Prof. Dr. A.V. Naumov)
- Laser Spectroscopy Dept. (head - Prof. Dr. E.A. Ryabov)
- Laser Spectral Instrumentation Dept. (head - Prof. Dr. O.N. Kompanets)
- Theoretical Dept. (head - Prof. Dr. A.M. Kamchatnov)
- Nanostructures Spectroscopy Lab. (head - Prof. Yu.E. Lozovik)
- Spectroscopy Experimental Methods Lab. (head - Dr. E.B. Perminov)

== Main scientific directions ==
1. Broad-range spectroscopy of atoms, ions, molecules, clusters, plasma, condensed matter (bulk and surface), novel materials with ultrahigh temporal, spectral, spatial resolution.
2. Development of new spectroscopic methods.
3. Laser spectroscopy (including applications for atom optics, nanophotonics, femtooptics, photochemistry, photobiology, analytical chemistry, nanotechnologies, isotopes separation etc.)
4. Analytical spectroscopy (including applications in technologies, for diagnostics purposes in material sciences, medicine, ecology etc.)
5. Development of unique apparatus, spectral instruments, detection systems, methods for spectral analysis in fundamental sciences as well as in applied fields.

In particular: - Atom and nanooptics - Femtosecond spectroscopy - Spectroscopy of excited state of atoms, molecules and condensed matter - Plasma spectroscopy - Single-molecule spectroscopy and imaging - Photon Echo spectroscopy - Near-field microscopy - High resolution Fourier-spectroscopy - Spectroscopy of quantum objects and nanostrusctures

== Conferences, schools, seminars ==
- Congress on spectroscopy
- The International Workshop on Quantum Optics The International Workshop on Quantum Optics
- The XIII International conference on hole burning, single molecule, and related spectroscopies: science and applications
- Conference on fundamental atomic spectroscopy
- Troitsk Conference on Medical Physics (TCMP)
- Youth scientific seminar
- Seminar in memory of Prof. Roman Personov

== Famous employees ==
- Sergey Mandelstam
- Vladilen Letokhov
- Roman Personov
- Lev Pavlovich Rapoport
