= Zeeman slower =

Instrument for slowing and cooling a beam of hot atoms

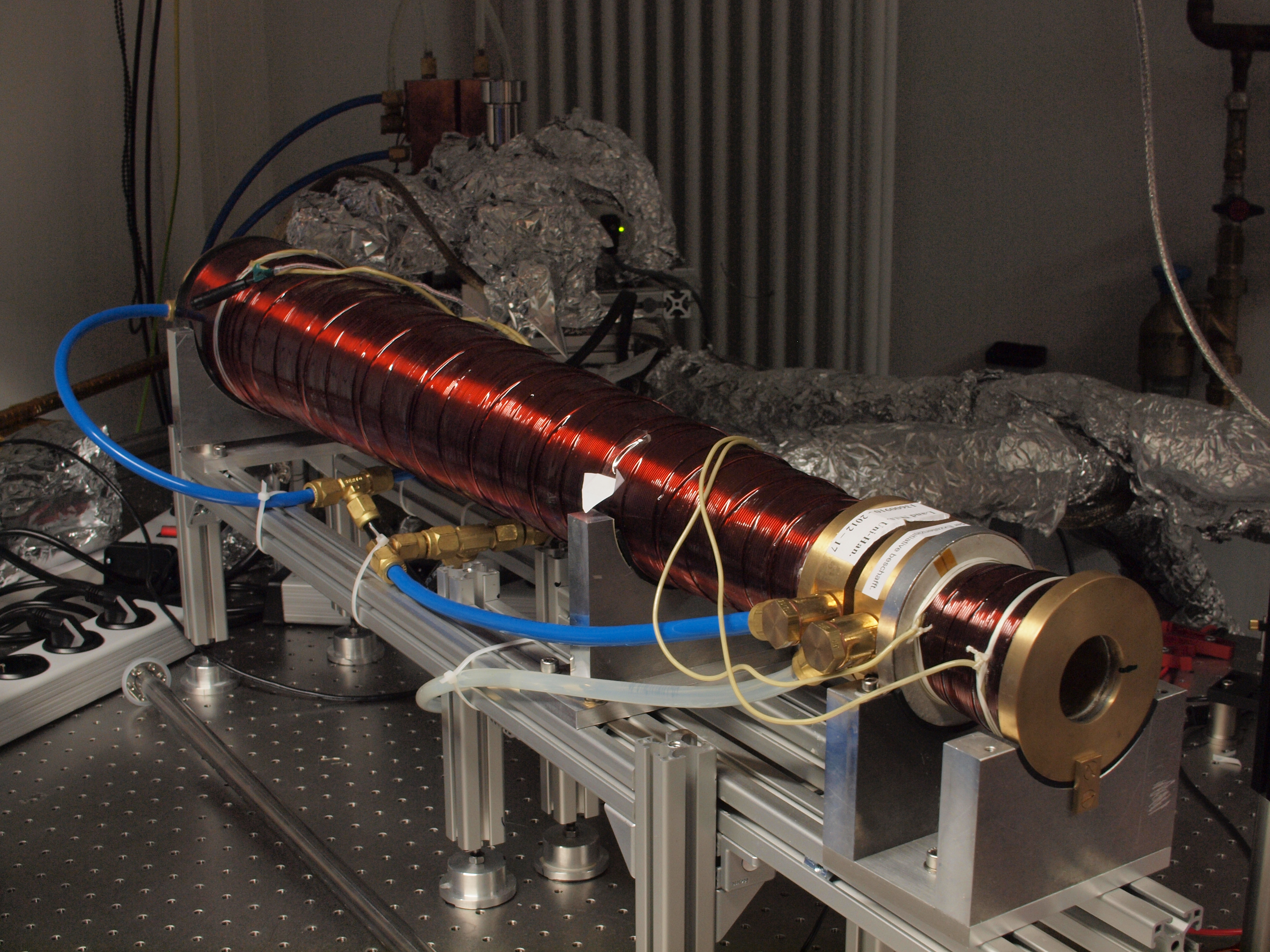
A Zeeman slower before its incorporation into a larger cold-atom experiment

In atomic physics, a Zeeman slower is a scientific instrument that is commonly used in atomic physics to slow and cool a beam of hot atoms to speeds of several meters per second and temperatures below a kelvin. The gas-phase atoms used in atomic physics are often generated in an oven by heating a solid or liquid atomic sample to temperatures where the vapor pressure is high enough that a substantial number of atoms are in the gas phase. These atoms effuse out of a hole in the oven with average speeds on the order of hundreds of m/s and large velocity distributions (due to their high temperature). The Zeeman slower is attached close to where the hot atoms exit the oven and are used to slow them to less than 10 m/s (slowing) with a very small velocity spread (cooling).

A Zeeman slower consists of a cylinder, through which an atomic beam travels, a pump laser that counterpropagates with respect to the beam's direction, and a magnetic field (commonly produced by a solenoid-like coil) that points along the cylinder's axis with a spatially varying magnitude. The pump laser, which is required to be near-resonant with atomic transition, Doppler-slows a certain velocity class within the velocity distribution of the beam. The spatially varying magnetic field is designed to Zeeman-shift the resonant frequency to match the decreasing Doppler shift as the atoms are slowed to lower velocities while they propagate through the Zeeman slower, allowing the pump laser to be continuously resonant and provide a slowing force.

== History ==
The Zeeman slower was first developed by Harold J. Metcalf and William D. Phillips (who was awarded 1/3 of the 1997 Nobel Prize in Physics in part for his work on the Zeeman slower). The achievement of these low temperatures led the way for the experimental realization of Bose–Einstein condensation, and a Zeeman slower can be part of such an apparatus.

== Principle ==
According to the principles of Doppler cooling, an atom modelled as a two-level atom can be cooled using a laser. If it moves in a specific direction and encounters a counter-propagating laser beam resonant with its transition, it is very likely to absorb a photon. The absorption of this photon gives the atom a "kick" in the direction that is consistent with momentum conservation and brings the atom to its excited state. However, this state is unstable, and some time later the atom decays back to its ground state via spontaneous emission (after a time on the order of nanoseconds; for example, in rubidium-87, the excited state of the D_{2} transition has a lifetime of 26.2 ns). The photon will be reemitted (and the atom will again increase its speed), but its direction will be random. When averaging over a large number of these processes applied to one atom, one sees that the absorption process decreases the speed always in the same direction (as the absorbed photon comes from a monodirectional source), whereas the emission process does not lead to any change in the speed of the atom because the emission direction is random. Thus the atom is being effectively slowed down by the laser beam.

There is nevertheless a problem in this basic scheme because of the Doppler effect. The resonance of the atom is rather narrow (on the order of a few megahertz), and after having decreased its momentum by a few recoil momenta, it is no longer in resonance with the pump beam because in its frame, the frequency of the laser has shifted. The Zeeman slower uses the fact that a magnetic field can change the resonance frequency of an atom using the Zeeman effect to tackle this problem.

The average acceleration (due to many photon absorption events over time) of an atom with mass $M$, a cycling transition with frequency $\omega = ck + \delta$, and linewidth $\gamma$, that is in the presence of a laser beam that has wavenumber $k$, and intensity $I = s_0 I_s$ (where $I_s = \hbar c \gamma k^3/(12\pi)$ is the saturation intensity of the laser) is

$$\vec{a} = \frac{\hbar\vec{k}\gamma}{2M} \frac{s_0}{1 + s_0 + (2\delta'/\gamma)^2}.$$

In the rest frame of the atoms with velocity $v$ in the atomic beam, the frequency of the laser beam is shifted by $k_L v$. In the presence of a magnetic field $B$, the atomic transition is Zeeman-shifted by an amount $\mu' B/\hbar$ (where $\mu'$ is the magnetic moment of the transition). Thus, the effective detuning of the laser from the zero-field resonant frequency of the atoms is

$$\delta' = \delta + kv - \frac{\mu'B}{\hbar}.$$

The atoms for which $\delta' = 0$ will experience the largest acceleration, namely

$$a = \eta a_\text{max},$$

where $\eta = s_0/(1 + s_0)$, and $a_\text{max} = \hbar k\gamma/(2M)$.

The most common approach is to require that we have a magnetic field profile that varies in the $z$ direction such that the atoms experience a constant acceleration $a = \eta a_\text{max}$ as they fly along the axis of the slower. It has been recently shown, however, that a different approach yields better results.

In the constant-deceleration approach we get

$$v(z) = \sqrt{v_i^2 - 2az},$$
$$B(z) = \frac{\hbar k}{\mu'} v + \frac{\hbar\delta}{\mu'} = \frac{\hbar kv_i}{\mu'} \sqrt{1 - \frac{2a}{v_i^2} z} + \frac{\hbar\delta}{\mu'},$$

where $v_i$ is the maximal velocity class that will be slowed; all the atoms in the velocity distribution that have velocities $v < v_i$ will be slowed, and those with velocities $v > v_i$ will not be slowed at all. The parameter $\eta$ (which determines the required laser intensity) is normally chosen to be around 0.5. If a Zeeman slower were to be operated with $\eta \approx 1$, then after absorbing a photon and moving to the excited state, the atom would preferentially re-emit a photon in the direction of the laser beam (due to stimulated emission), which would counteract the slowing process.

== Realization ==
The required form of the spatially inhomogeneous magnetic field as we showed above has the form

$$B(z) = B_0 + B_a \sqrt{1 - z/z_0}.$$

This field can be realized a few different ways. The most popular design requires wrapping a current-carrying wire with many layered windings where the field is strongest (around 20–50 windings) and few windings where the field is weak. Alternative designs include a single-layer coil that varies in the pitch of the winding and an array of permanent magnets in various configurations.

== Outgoing atoms ==
The Zeeman slower is usually used as a preliminary step to cool the atoms in order to trap them in a magneto-optical trap. Thus it aims at a final velocity of about 10 m/s (depending on the atom used), starting with a beam of atoms with a velocity of a few hundred meters per second. The final speed to be reached is a compromise between the technical difficulty of having a long Zeeman slower and the maximal speed allowed for an efficient loading into the trap.

A limitation of setup can be the transverse heating of the beam. It is linked to the fluctuations of the speed along the three axes around its mean values, since the final speed was said to be an average over a large number of processes. These fluctuations are linked to the atom having a Brownian motion due to the random reemission of the absorbed photon. They may cause difficulties when loading the atoms in the next trap.
