= JILA =

Physics laboratory in Colorado

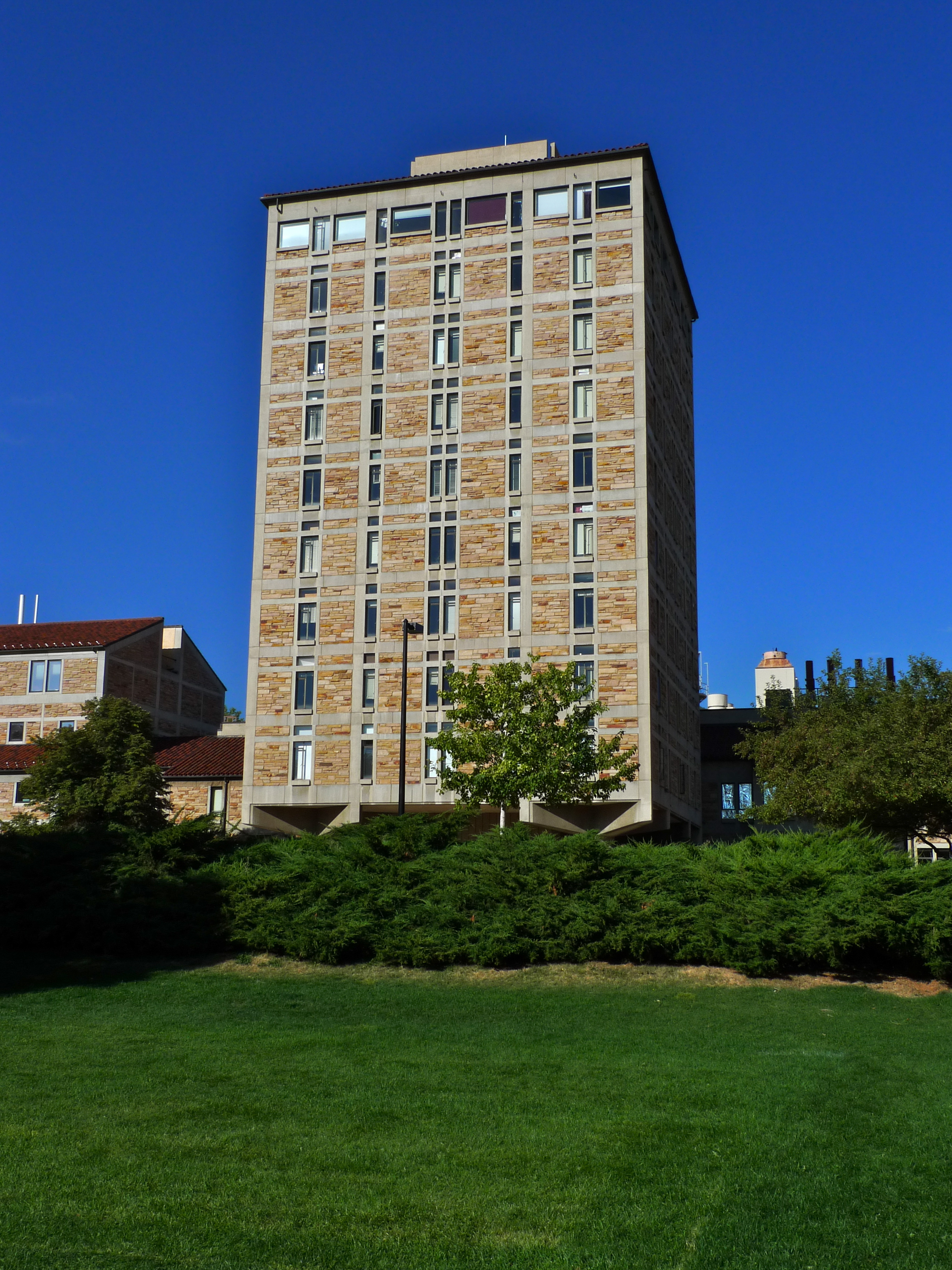
- The JILA tower at the University of Colorado
- Parent institution: University of Colorado Boulder; National Institute of Standards and Technology
- Established: 1962; 63 years ago
- Focus: Physical sciences
- Chair: Konrad Lehnert
- Formerly called: Joint Institute for Laboratory Astrophysics
- Location: Boulder, Colorado, U.S.
- Coordinates: 40°00′27″N 105°16′06″W
- Website: jila.colorado.edu

JILA, formerly known as the Joint Institute for Laboratory Astrophysics, is a physical science research institute in the United States. JILA is located on the University of Colorado Boulder campus. JILA was founded in 1962 as a joint institute of the University of Colorado Boulder and the National Institute of Standards & Technology.

== Research ==
JILA is one of the nation’s leading research institutes in the physical sciences. The world's first Bose–Einstein condensate was created at JILA by Eric Cornell and Carl Wieman in 1995. The first frequency comb demonstration was led by John L. Hall at JILA. The first demonstrations of a Fermionic condensate and BEC-BCS crossover physics were done by Deborah S. Jin.

JILA’s faculty members hold appointments in a wide range of disciplines, including the Departments of Physics, Astrophysical and Planetary Science, Chemistry and Biochemistry, and Molecular, Cellular, and Developmental Biology, as well as Engineering. Many faculty also hold joint appointments with the National Institute of Standards and Technology (NIST). JILA’s Quantum Physics Division of NIST members hold joint faculty appointments at CU in the same departments.

Research at JILA addresses fundamental scientific questions about the limits of quantum measurements and technologies, the design of precision optical and X-ray lasers, the fundamental principles underlying the interaction of light and matter, the role of quantum physics in chemistry and biology, and the processes that have governed the evolution of the Universe for nearly 14 billion years.

== Staff ==
JILA's current faculty includes two Nobel laureates—Eric Cornell and John L. Hall—and two John D. and Catherine T. MacArthur Fellows— Margaret Murnane and Ana Maria Rey. David J. Wineland and Carl Wieman, both previous affiliated with NIST and JILA respectively, were also awarded the Nobel Prize in Physics, while Deborah Jin was previously awarded a MacArthur Fellowship. Each year, JILA scientists publish more than 200 original research papers in national and international scientific journals and conference proceedings.
