= Prescott (surname) =

Presscot
- Pronunciation: //

Origin
- Origin: Old English
- Region of origin: England

Other names
- Variant form: Numerous

Prescott is a surname of English origin, a habitational name from any of the places so called, in southwestern Lancashire (now Merseyside), Gloucestershire, Oxfordshire, Shropshire and Devon, all of which are named from Old English preost 'priest' + cot 'cottage', 'dwelling'. The surname is most common in Lancashire, and so it seems likely that the first of these places is the most frequent source. It is also present in Ireland, being recorded there first in the 15th century.

== List ==
Notable people with the surname include:

- Abel Prescott, Jr. (1749–1775), American patriot
- Abraham Prescott (1789–1858), American luthier
- Alan Prescott (1927–1998), English rugby league footballer
- Albert Benjamin Prescott (1832–1905), American chemist
- Benjamin F. Prescott (1833–1895), American lawyer, newspaper editor, and politician
- Breidis Prescott (born 1983), Colombian boxer
- Carol Prescott, American psychologist and gerontologist
- Charles Prescott (disambiguation), multiple people, including:
  - Charles John Prescott (1857–1946), English born Australian army chaplain, Methodist minister and headmaster
  - Charles Ramage Prescott (1772–1859), merchant, noted horticulturalist and political figure in Nova Scotia
  - Charles Y. Prescott (born 1938), American particle physicist
- Dak Prescott (born 1993), American football quarterback
- Edward C. Prescott (1940-2022), American Nobel prize-winning economist
- George Prescott (1913–1988), American politician from Michigan
- H. F. M. Prescott (1896–1972), English author, academic and historian
- Henry Prescott (1783–1874), officer of the British Royal Navy
- Henry W. Prescott (1874–1943), American classicist
- James W. Prescott (born c. 1930), American developmental psychologist
- John Prescott (disambiguation), multiple people, including:
  - John Prescott (1938–2024) British politician, Deputy Prime Minister of the United Kingdom
  - John Prescott (died 1412), (c. 1327 – 1412), English MP for Exeter, Totnes and Devon
  - John B. Prescott (born 1940), Australian CEO of BHP
  - John Robert Victor Prescott, Australian geographer
- Katherine T. Hooper Prescott (1851–1926), American sculptor
- Kathryn Prescott (born 1991), English actress
- Mary Newmarch Prescott (1849-1888), American magazine writer and poet
- Megan Prescott (born 1991), English actress and bodybuilder
- Norm Prescott (1927–2005), American film producer
- Paul Prescott (born 1986), English rugby league footballer
- Peter Prescott (disambiguation), multiple people, including:
  - Peter Prescott (musician) (born 1957), American drummer from Boston
  - Peter Prescott (barrister) (born 1943), English barrister, Queen's Counsel and Deputy High Court Judge
  - Peter S. Prescott (died 2004), American author, book reviewer, and critic
- Philander Prescott (1801–1862), American pioneer of Wisconsin and Minnesota, namesake of Prescott, Wisconsin
- Rebecca Minot Prescott (1742–1813), second wife of Roger Sherman
- Richard Prescott (1725–1788), British officer during the American Revolutionary War
- Robert Prescott (c. 1726 – 1815), British soldier and colonial administrator
- Robert Prescott (actor), American actor
- Samuel Prescott (1751–1777), American who completed Paul Revere's midnight ride
- Samuel Cate Prescott, MIT dean and pioneer food technologist
- Stef Prescott, Filipina actress
- William Prescott (1726–1795), colonel in American Revolutionary War, Battle of Bunker Hill
- William H. Prescott, American historian
- W. W. Prescott (William Warren Prescott, 1855–1944), educator and administrator in the Seventh-day Adventist Church

=== Fictional characters ===
- Jessie Prescott, the titular character from the Disney Channel series Jessie
- Jim Prescott, from the TV series 24
- Nathan Prescott, from the video game Life Is Strange
- Sidney Prescott, the protagonist of the Scream movie series
