= Aspen Center for Physics =

Physics research institute

Coordinates: 39°11′53″N 106°49′44″W

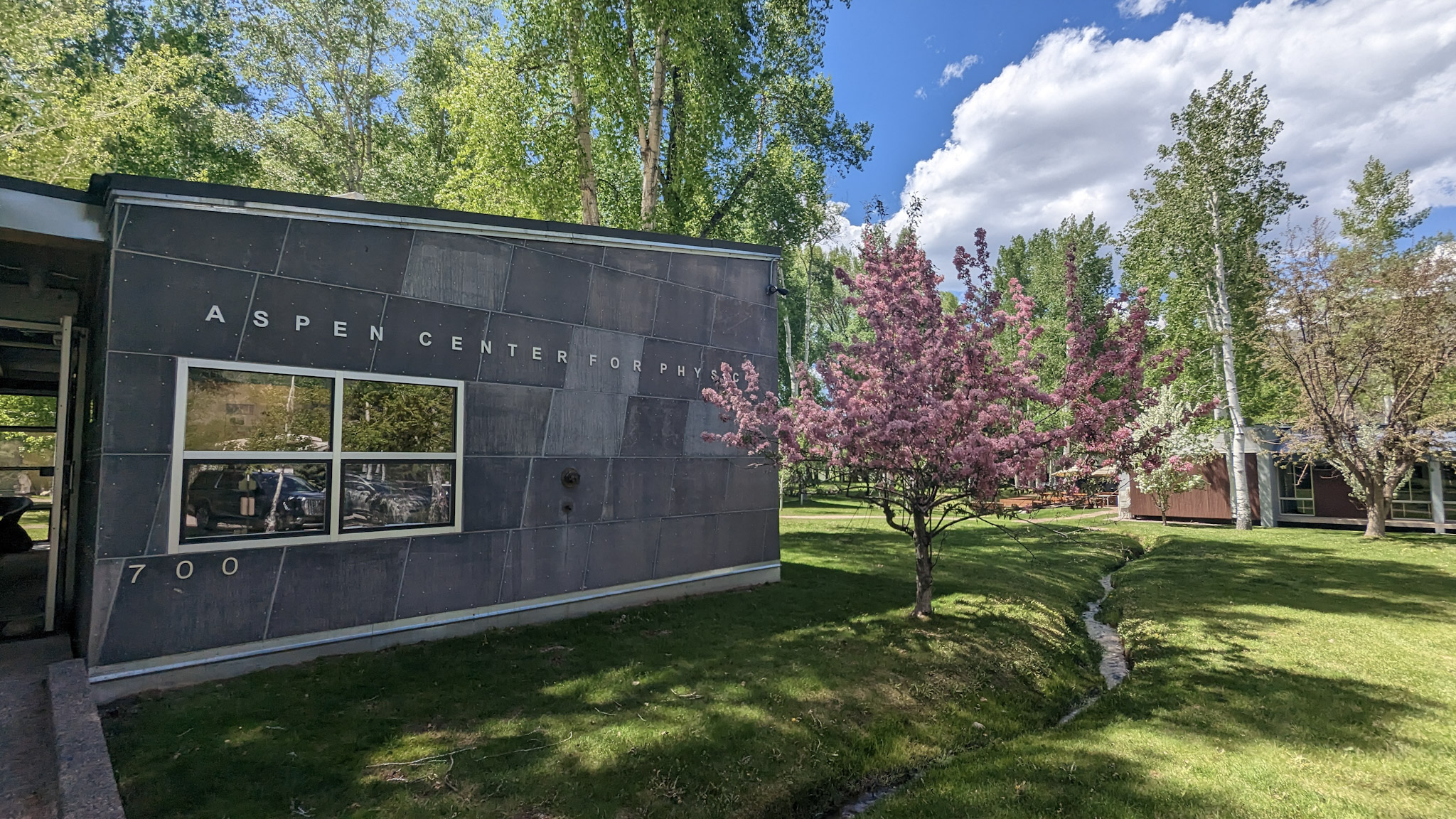
- Founders: George Stranahan; Michael Cohen; Robert Craig
- Established: 1962
- Focus: Physics
- President: Zoltan Ligeti
- Address: 700 Gillespie Ave, Aspen, CO 81611, USA
- Location: Aspen, Colorado, United States
- Website: aspenphys.org

The Aspen Center for Physics (ACP) is a non-profit institution for physics research located in Aspen, Colorado, in the Rocky Mountains region of the United States. Since its foundation in 1962, it has hosted distinguished physicists for short-term visits during seasonal winter and summer programs, to promote collaborative research in fields including astrophysics, cosmology, condensed matter physics, string theory, quantum physics, biophysics, and more.

To date, sixty-six of the center's affiliates have won Nobel Prizes in Physics and three have won Fields Medals in mathematics. Its affiliates have garnered a wide array of other national and international distinctions, among them the Abel Prize, the Dirac Medal, the Guggenheim Fellowship, the MacArthur Prize, and the Breakthrough Prize. Its visitors have included figures such as the cosmologist and gravitational theorist Stephen Hawking, the particle physicist Murray Gell-Mann, the condensed matter theorist Philip W. Anderson, and the former Prime Minister of the United Kingdom, Margaret Thatcher.

In addition to serving as a locus for physics research, the ACP's mission has entailed public outreach: offering programs to educate the general public about physics and to stimulate interest in the subject among youth.

== History & public outreach ==
The Aspen Center for Physics was founded in 1962 by three people: George Stranahan, Michael Cohen, and Robert W. Craig. George Stranahan, then a postdoctoral fellow at Purdue University, played a critical role in raising funds and early public support for the initiative. He later left physics to become a craft brewer, rancher, and entrepreneur, although he remained a lifelong supporter of the center. Stranahan's enterprises included the Flying Dog Brewery. Michael Cohen was a professor at the University of Pennsylvania and a condensed matter physicist whose work investigated the properties of real-world material systems such as ferroelectrics, liquid helium, and biological membranes. Robert W. Craig was the first director of the Aspen Institute, an international non-profit center which supports the exchange of ideas on matters relating to public policy.

From its establishment, the ACP has developed a close relationship with the city of Aspen and has contributed to the cultural life of the local community. It has collaborated with other institutions such as the Aspen Institute, the Aspen Music Festival, the Wheeler Opera House, the Aspen Science Center, and the Pitkin County Library.

The center has benefitted from the generosity of public support, notably from the National Science Foundation, the US Department of Energy, NASA, and from the gifts of private donors. These funds have helped to bring hundreds of scientists to the center every year, and have enabled the ACP to host a wide array of public lectures and activities.

In addition to sponsoring these public events at its campus in Aspen, the ACP has also broadcast programs on a local-access television station – the “Physics Preview” show on Grassrootstv.org – and on radio, via its ″Radio Physics″ program for high school students on the KDNK station.

== Supporters & donors ==
The Aspen Center for Physics has benefitted over the years from many acts of philanthropy. Gifts from Aspen donors as well as from George Stranahan, Martin Flug, the Smart Family Foundation, and affiliated physicists have been especially important to sustaining the center's development and operation.

George Stranahan was an early driving force behind the establishment and funding of the ACP. After convincing the Aspen Institute to open in 1961 an independent physics division, where scientists could convene to conduct research, he began raising funds to open the Aspen Center for Physics, by collecting donations from locals and Aspen Institute participants. Stranahan raised funds for the original ACP building at a cost of $85,000, while contributing $38,000 himself. To recognize the central role that Stranahan played in establishing the center, the first building constructed on the ACP campus is named in his honor as Stranahan Hall. It was designed by Herbert Bayer, who pioneered Aspen's post-World War Two architectural revitalization.

Martin Flug, an Aspen businessman who had been interested in physics since his undergraduate time at Harvard University, funded the construction of an auditorium and a lecture series to accompany it: the Flug Forum. The auditorium is named to honor Flug's father Samuel Flug, an investment banker who was born in Warsaw, Poland and who died in 1962.

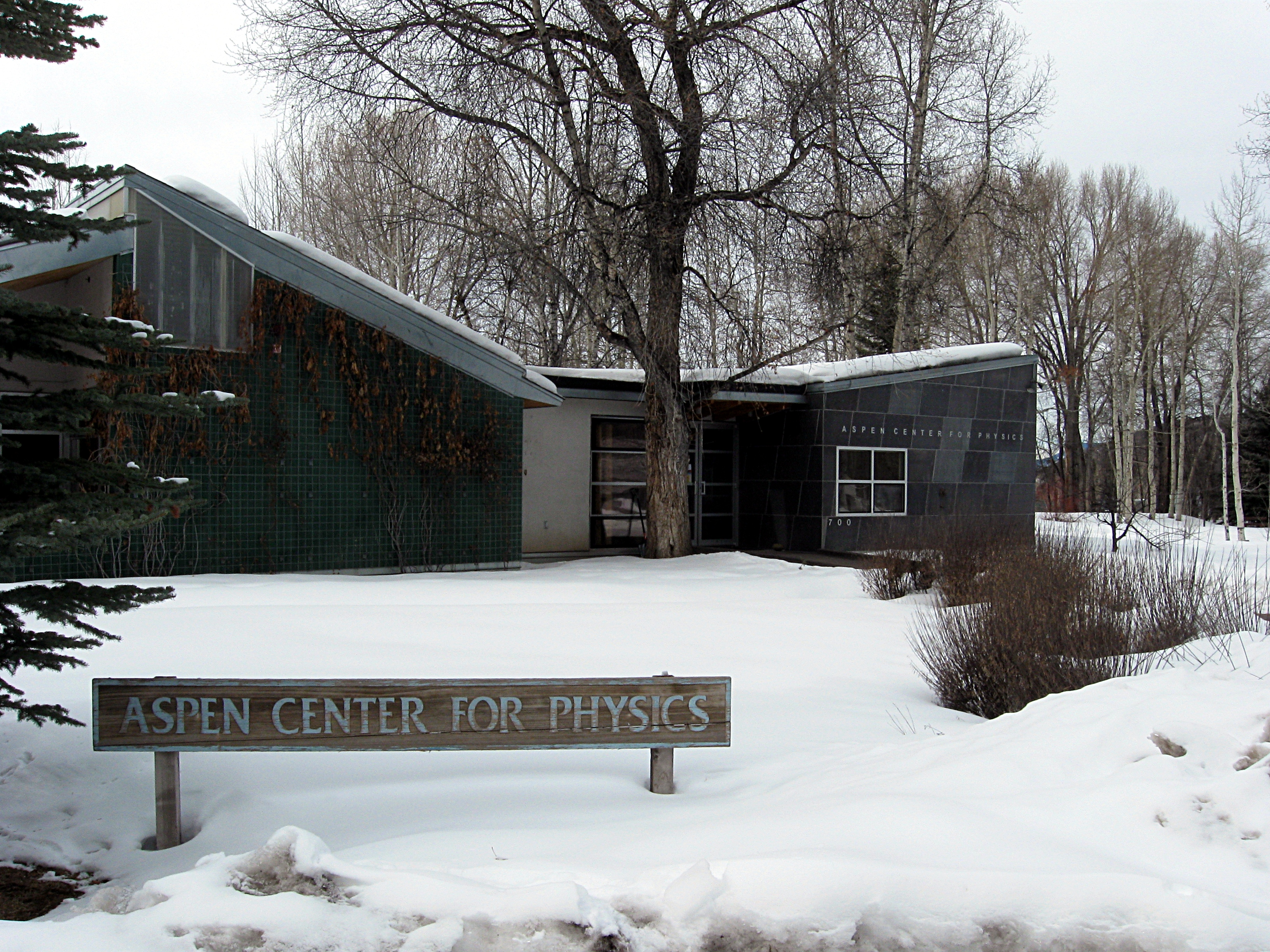
Smart Hall

The Smart Family Foundation of Connecticut funded the construction of Smart Hall, a building on the ACP campus erected in 1996. The gift was arranged by A. Douglas Stone, a member of the Smart family, a physicist at Yale University, and a past ACP Scientific Secretary, Trustee, General Member, and Honorary Member.

The third building on the ACP campus, Bethe Hall, is named after Hans Bethe, the German-American nuclear physicist, based at Cornell University. Bethe donated part of his prize money to the ACP after winning the Nobel Prize for Physics in 1967 for his work on stellar nucleosynthesis. Bethe was a long-standing participant at the center: he was vice president and Trustee in the 1970s, then an Honorary Trustee from the 1970s until his death in 2005.

Following Bethe's example, several other physicists whose achievements merited awards went on to donate part of their prize money to the ACP. Recognizing these scientist-donors, the ACP established the “Bethe Circle.”

Bethe Circle
Name of Physicist	Award	Year
Gordon Baym	APS Medal for Exceptional Achievement in Research	2021
Daniel Freedman	Special Breakthrough Prize	2019
Vassiliki Kalogera	Hans A. Bethe Prize	2016
Greg Moore	Dannie Heineman Prize for Mathematical Physics	2014
Hirosi Ooguri	Hamburg Prize for Theoretical Physics	2018
Pierre Ramond	Dannie Heineman Prize for Mathematical Physics	2015
John Schwarz	Physics Frontiers Prize	2013
Matthias Troyer	Aneesur Rahman Prize for Computational Physics	2016

== Luminaries ==
ACP participants have included hundreds of post–doctoral fellows, professors, researchers and experimentalists who have come for short-term visits. Some had already achieved distinction before coming to the center; others won prizes or gained international recognition after spending time at the ACP early in their careers. Dozens of ACP physicists have received prestigious awards for their work, including the Nobel Prize in Physics.

The following scientists have participated at the Aspen Center for Physics at least once. Several have attended for a number of years.

Nobel Prize Winners
Nobel Laureate	Year of Prize
Philip Warren Anderson	1977
Arthur Ashkin	2018
John Bardeen	1956, 1972
Barry C. Barish	2017
Hans Bethe	1967
Owen Chamberlain	1959
Steven Chu	1997
Leon N. Cooper	1972
Francis Harry C. Crick	1962
James Watson Cronin	1980
Richard Feynman	1965
Val Logsdon Fitch	1980
William Alfred Fowler	1983
Murray Gell-Mann	1969
Andrea Ghez	2020
Riccardo Giacconi	2002
Donald A. Glaser	1960
Sheldon L. Glashow	1979
David Gross	2004
Duncan M. Haldane	2016
John L. Hall	2005
Robert Hofstadter	1961
Russell Hulse	1993
Brian D. Josephson	1973
Takaaki Kajita	2015
Wolfgang Ketterle	2001
Walter Kohn	1998
Masatoshi Koshiba	2002
John M. Kosterlitz	2016
Robert B. Laughlin	1998
Leon Max Lederman	1988
David Morris Lee	1996
Tsung-Dao Lee	1957
Anthony James Leggett	2003
John C. Mather	2006
Michel Mayor	2019
W.E. Moerner	2014
Yoichiro Nambu	2008
Konstantin S. Novoselov	2010
Douglas D. Osheroff	1996
P. James E. Peebles	2019
Roger Penrose	2020
Martin L. Perl	1995
Saul Perlmutter	2011
Edward M. Purcell	1952
Didier Queloz	2019
Norman Foster Ramsey	1989
Frederick Reines	1995
Robert C. Richardson	1996
Adam Riess	2011
Carlo Rubbia	1984
Brian Schmidt	2011
J. Robert Schrieffer	1972
George Smoot	2006
Gerardus 't Hooft	1999
Joseph H. Taylor	1993
Kip S. Thorne	2017
David J. Thouless	2016
Samuel C. C. Ting	1976
Charles Hard Townes	1964
Daniel Tsui	1998
Martinus J.G. Veltman	1999
Rainer Weiss	2017
Carl E. Wieman	2001
Frank Wilczek	2004
Kenneth Geddes Wilson	1982

Fields Medalists
Fields Medalists	Year of Prize
Michael Freedman	1986
Stephen Smale	1966
Edward Witten	1990

Abel Prize Winners
Abel Laureates	Year of Prize
Karen Uhlenbeck	2019
Isador M. Singer	2004

Recent Prizewinners
Prizewinners	Name of Prize	Year of Prize	Institution
Elihu Abrahams	Oliver E. Buckley Condensed Matter Prize	2019	University of California, Los Angeles
Gordon Baym	APS Medal for Exceptional Achievement in Research	2021	University of Illinois Urbana Champaign
Paul M. Chaikin	Oliver E. Buckley Condensed Matter Prize	2018	New York University
Sally Dawson	J.J. Sakurai Prize for Theoretical Particle Physics	2017	Brookhaven National Laboratory
Alexei Efros	Oliver E. Buckley Condensed Matter Prize	2019	University of Utah
Daniel Freedman	Special Breakthrough Prize	2019	Stanford University
Michael Green	Physics Frontiers Prize	2014	Cambridge University
John F. Gunion	J.J. Sakurai Prize for Theoretical Particle Physics	2017	University of California Davis
Howard Haber	J.J. Sakurai Prize for Theoretical Particle Physics	2017	University of California Santa Cruz
C. R. Hagen	J.J. Sakurai Prize for Theoretical Particle Physics	2010	University of Rochester
David Hitlin	W.K.H. Panofsky Prize in Experimental Particle Physics	2016	California Institute of Technology
Randy Hulet	Davisson–Germer Prize	2016	Rice University
Clifford Johnson	Klopsteg Memorial Lecture Award	2018	University of Southern California
Clifford Johnson	Simons Fellow in Theoretical Physics	2016	University of Southern California
Vassiliki Kalogera	Hans E. Bethe Prize	2016	Northwestern University
Marc Kamionkowski	Dannie Heineman Prize for Astrophysics	2015	Johns Hopkins University
Gordon Kane	J.J. Sakurai Prize for Theoretical Particle Physics	2017	University of Michigan
Alexei Kitaev	Dirac Medal of the ICTP	2015	California Institute of Technology
Alexei Kitaev	Oliver E. Buckley Condensed Matter Prize	2017	California Institute of Technology
Andy Millis	Hamburg Prize for Theoretical Physics	2017	Columbia University
Greg Moore	Dannie Heineman Prize for Mathematical Physics	2014	Rutgers University
Greg Moore	Dirac Medal of the ICTP	2015	Rutgers University
Ann Nelson	J.J. Sakurai Prize for Theoretical Particle Physics	2018	University of Washington
Hirosi Ooguri	Hamburg Prize for Theoretical Physics	2018	California Institute of Technology and Kavli IPMU
Hirosi Ooguri	Medal of Honor with Purple Ribbon	2019	California Institute of Technology and Kavli IPMU
David Pines	Julius Edgar Lilienfeld Prize	2016	University of California Davis
Pierre Ramond	Dannie Heineman Prize for Mathematical Physics	2015	University of Florida
Pierre Ramond	Dirac Medal of the ICTP	2020	University of Florida
Nicholas Read	Dirac Medal of the ICTP	2015	Yale University
Subir Sachdev	Dirac Medal of the ICTP	2018	Harvard University
John Schwarz	Physics Frontiers Prize	2013	California Institute of Technology
Boris Shklovskii	Oliver E. Buckley Condensed Matter Prize	2019	University of Minnesota
David Spergel	Dannie Heineman Prize for Astrophysics	2015	Princeton University
Ian Spielman	Rabi Prize in Atomic, Molecular & Optical Physics	2015	National Institute of Standards and Technology
Dam Thanh Son	Dirac Medal of the ICTP	2018	University of Chicago
Matthias Troyer	Aneesur Rahman Prize for Computational Physics	2016	Microsoft
Matthias Troyer	Hamburg Prize for Theoretical Physics	2019	Microsoft
Karen Uhlenbeck	Abel Prize	2019	University of Texas at Austin
Migual Virasoro	Dirac Medal of the ICTP	2020	Universidad Nacional de General Sarmient
Xiao-Gang Wen	Dirac Medal of the ICTP	2018	Massachusetts Institute of Technology
Xiao-Gang Wen	Oliver E. Buckley Condensed Matter Prize	2017	Massachusetts Institute of Technology
