= Michael Cohen (physicist) =

Professor Emeritus at UPenn

- Born: May 9, 1930; New York City, United States
- Died: June 30, 2024 (aged 94); Wynnewood, Pennsylvania, United States
- Education: Cornell University (B.S.); Caltech (PhD)
- Honours: Fellow of the American Physical Society
- Scientific career
- Fields: Condensed matter physics
- Workplaces: University of Pennsylvania; Aspen Center for Physics (co-founder)
- Thesis: The Energy Spectrum of the Excitations in Liquid Helium (1956)
- Doctoral advisor: Richard Feynman

Michael Cohen (May 9, 1930 — June 30, 2024) was an American condensed matter physicist and professor emeritus at the University of Pennsylvania. He worked on understanding liquid helium, ferroelectrics, and biological membranes using quantum mechanics.

He was a fellow of the American Physical Society and co-founder and Honorary Trustee of the Aspen Center for Physics (ACP), described as a "utopia for physicists."

== Life ==
Michael Cohen was born in Manhattan, New York City in 1930.

Cohen earned his Bachelor of Science degree at Cornell University in 1951. While at Cornell, he was distinguished under the Phi Betta Kappa honors society. Under the supervision of Richard Feynman, with whom he published papers on the physics of liquid helium, Cohen earned his Ph.D. at the California Institute of Technology (Caltech) in 1956. Cohen held postdoctoral positions at Caltech and the Institute for Advanced Study at Princeton with J. Robert Oppenheimer before joining the faculty in the department of physics at the University of Pennsylvania. Among the Ph.D. candidates whom Cohen supervised is the physicist Mark G. Kuzyk. He also worked as a member of Penn’s faculty senate.

Cohen organized problem-solving seminars for graduate students preparing for the Ph.D. qualifying exam. For this work he referred to himself as “the department’s Stanley Kaplan.”

In 1960, the American Physical Society appointed him a fellow.

In 1962, Cohen worked with colleagues George Stranahan and Robert W. Craig to establish and raise funds for the Aspen Center for Physics to foster collaborative research among physicists from different sub-fields, independent of any one university or institution. Together they generated initial support from the U.S. Office of Naval Research and the Needmor Fund to finance the center's first building. A historical retrospective of the ACP, written upon its fiftieth anniversary, suggested that Cohen's role in the center's establishment was that he "found the talent" – that is, drew in the physicists – for its early scientific programs. In 1963 he recruited Hans Bethe into the institute.

He became emeritus professor in 1998.

He died in Wynnewood, Pennsylvania in 2024.

== Books ==
In 2011, Cohen completed a textbook entitled, Classical Mechanics: a Critical Introduction, in collaboration with fellow physicist Larry Gladney, who prepared the solutions manual.

== Mountain climbing ==
Cohen was also mountain climber. In 1963, with two other climbers, he completed the first ascent of the north face of Capitol Peak. Also two rock-climbing routes near Aspen, Colorado are named after him: Cohen's Crown and Cohen's Last Problem.
