= Alexei Efros =

Alexei Efros may refer to:

- Alexei L. Efros (born 1938), physicist
- Alexei A. Efros (born 1975), computer scientist, son of Alexei L. Efros

== See also ==
- Alexander Efros, physicist, brother of Alexei L. Efros
