= John Prescott (disambiguation) =

John Prescott (1938–2024) was a British politician who served as Deputy Prime Minister from 1997 to 2007.

John Prescott may also refer to:

- John Prescott (died 1412) (1327–1412), English MP for Exeter, Totnes and Devon
- John B. Prescott (born 1940), Australian CEO of BHP
- John Robert Victor Prescott (1931–2018), Australian geographer
- Jack Prescott (c.1880–1959), American silent film actor and director
- Jack Prescott (rugby league) (1890–1989), English rugby league footballer who played in the 1900s, 1910s and 1920s
- Johnny Prescott (1938–2012), English boxer of the 1960s and 1970s

== See also ==
- Jon Prescott (born 1981), American actor
