= Wesley Smith =

Wesley Smith may refer to:

- Wesley J. Smith (born 1949), American lawyer and author
- Wesley O. Smith (1878–1951), American newspaper publisher and businessman
- Wesley Smith (academic), physics professor at University of Wisconsin–Madison

== See also ==
- Wes Smith (disambiguation)
