= Harizanov =

Harizanov, female Harizanova (Bulgarian: Харизанов) is a surname. Notable people with the surname include:

- Nikolay Harizanov (born 1983), Bulgarian footballer
- Valentina Harizanov, Serbian-American mathematician
