= Wild Goose (beer) =

Wild Goose is a brand of beer brewed by the National Brewing Company of Easton, Maryland. The brand is available in traditional British-style ale including an IPA (India Pale Ale) and an Oatmeal Stout.

== History ==
The original Wild Goose Brewery was established by Washington area lawyers Ted Garrish and John Byington, businesswoman Nancy Davis and journalist (and former speechwriter) Rich Klein in 1989 (37 years ago). The site of the brewery was in a section of the old Phillips packing plant, an abandoned oyster cannery facility in Cambridge, on the Eastern Shore of Maryland. Originally conceived as a brewpub, the founders were forced to bottle Wild Goose due to Prohibition Era laws (that were still then in effect) that restricted brewing and sale of alcohol on the same premises. Wild Goose was only the second micro-brewery to operate in Maryland since Prohibition ended in 1933.

The original label of Wild Goose Amber featured both crabs and geese, and in 1990 Wild Goose launched a new brew named Thomas Point Light, named after the Thomas Point Shoal Lighthouse. The name was later changed to Wild Goose Golden to remove confusion as to whether this was a low calorie beer like Coors Light or Miller Light.

Wild Goose's first brew was in October 1989 and produced at full-capacity, approximately 4,500 cases per month.

Wild Goose was widely distributed in bottles and kegs in Annapolis and throughout the Eastern Shore, with selected distribution in Washington D.C and Baltimore. Wild Goose was served locally under the name Samuel Middleton's Pale Ale. Wild Goose also brewed a house brand for Baltimore's Wharf Rat.

In 1997, Kevin Brannon and Marjorie McGinnis of the Frederick Brewing Company acquired the Wild Goose brand and commenced brewing Wild Goose Ales in Frederick, Maryland sometime during 1998.

In December 2010, the Logan Shaw Brewing Company purchased the Wild Goose brand from Flying Dog Brewery, with plans to pair Wild Goose beers with their own craft brews. Logan Shaw sold the Wild Goose Brands to Tim Miller and the National Brewing Company in late 2015. Snow Goose was re released on draft in the Fall of 2017, now Snow Goose and Wild Goose IPA are available in cans and draft with more to follow.

== Beer Timeline ==
- 1989 - Wild Goose Amber.
  - 3.58 / 5, as reviewed by Beer Advocate.
  - ABV: 5.0%
  - Availability: year-round
- 1990 - Thomas Point Light Golden Ale (later renamed Wild Goose Golden)
- 1990 - Samuel Middleton's Pale Ale
- 1992 - Snow Goose
  - 3.67 / 5, as reviewed by Beer Advocate.
  - ABV: 6.3%
  - Availability: Winter seasonal.
  - Chocolate flavored.
- 1996 - Wild Goose India Pale Ale (IPA)
- 1998 - Wild Goose Hempen Ale
- 200? - Wild Goose Pumpkin Patch Ale
- 2006 - Wild Goose Oatmeal Stout

== Awards ==
The Wild Goose India Pale Ale was awarded the Gold Medal at the 2008 World Beer Cup.
