= Regina Rameika =

American neutrino physicist

Regina Abby Rameika is an American experimental neutrino physicist known for her work with the DONUT collaboration at Fermilab, which provided the first direct observations of the tau neutrino. She continues to work as a distinguished scientist at Fermilab, where she is co-spokesperson for the Deep Underground Neutrino Experiment (DUNE).

== Career and research ==
Rameika majored in physics at Rutgers University, graduating in 1976. She completed her Ph.D. at Rutgers in 1982, and joined Fermilab in the same year. She was named a distinguished scientist at Fermilab in 2008.

Although one of her freshman college papers involved solar neutrinos, Rameika's early work at Rutgers and Fermilab involved the polarization and magnetic moments of hyperons. Her interests shifted to neutrino physics in the 1990s, and involved the NuMI, MINOS, NOvA, and MicroBooNE projects as well as the DONUT project. She was project manager for MINOS, and from 2014 to 2016 served as head of the Fermilab Neutrino Division. She was production coordinator and resource coordinator for DUNE before becoming its co-spokesperson.

== Recognition ==
Rameika was named a Fellow of the American Physical Society (APS) in 2001, after a nomination from the APS Division of Particles and Fields, "for her crucial role in establishing the first direct evidence for the tau neutrino". She was one of four joint winners of the APS's 2022 W. K. H. Panofsky Prize in Experimental Particle Physics, "for the first direct observation of the tau neutrino through its charged-current interactions in an emulsion detector".
