= Peter Prescott =

Peter Prescott may refer to:

- Peter Prescott (musician) (born 1957), American drummer from Boston
- Peter Prescott (barrister) (born 1943), English barrister, Queen's Counsel and Deputy High Court Judge
- Peter S. Prescott (died 2004), American author, book reviewer, and critic
