= Vicky Kalogera =

Greek astrophysicist

- Vassiliki Kalogera
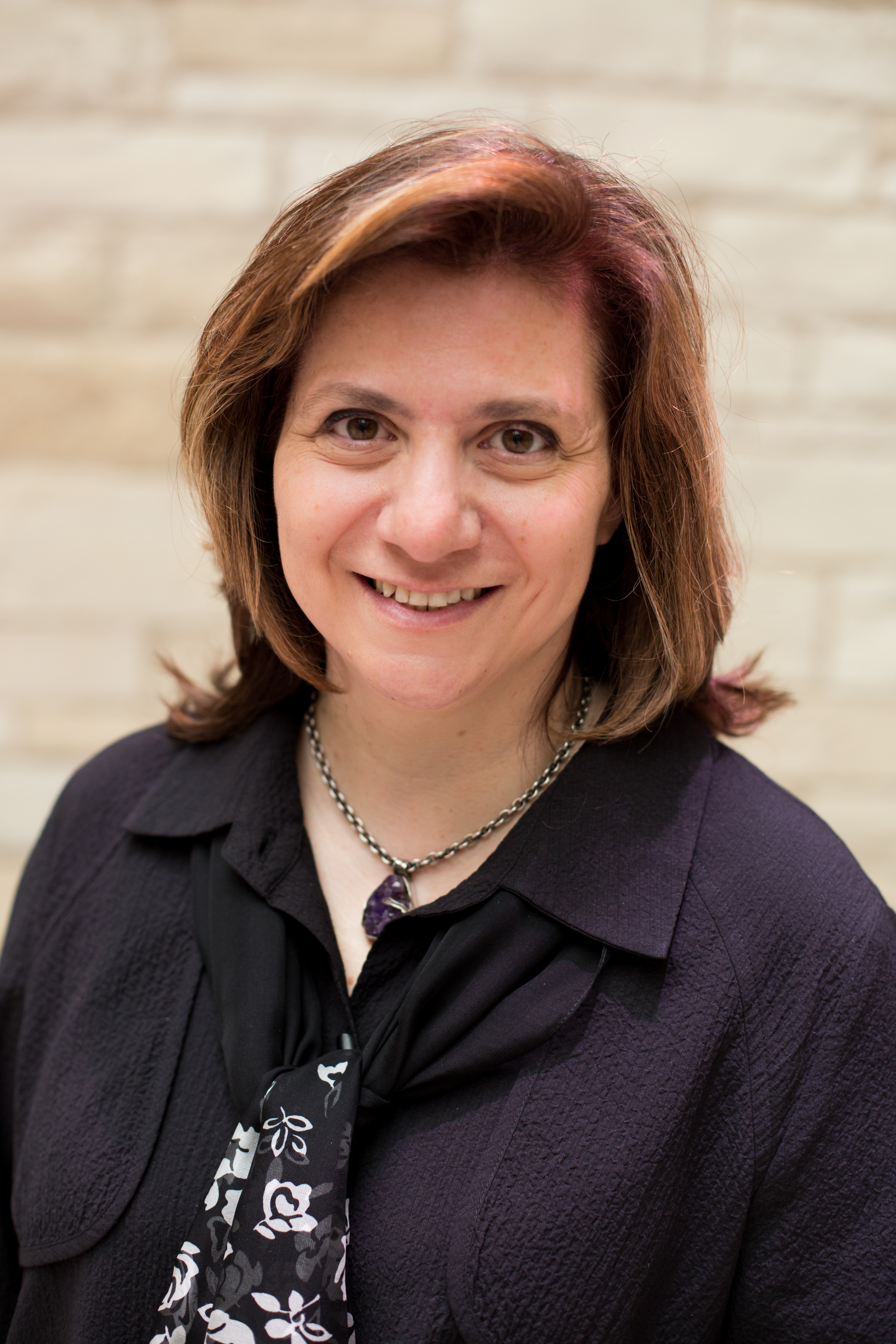
- Born: 15 February 1971 (age 55); Serres, Greece
- Education: University of Thessaloniki; University of Illinois Urbana-Champaign
- Spouse(s): Frederic A. Rasio, Astrophysicist
- Awards: National Academy of Sciences Fellow (2018); Dannie Heineman Prize for Astrophysics (2018); Hans A. Bethe Prize (2016)
- Scientific career
- Fields: Gravitational waves
- Workplaces: Northwestern University
- Thesis: Formation of low-mass x-ray binaries (1997)
- Doctoral advisor: Ronald F. Webbink
- Website: www.physics.northwestern.edu/people/faculty/core-faculty/vicky-kalogera.html

Notes
- Director of the Center for Interdisciplinary Exploration & Research in Astrophysics (CIERA) at Northwestern University

Vassiliki Kalogera is a Greek astrophysicist. She is the Daniel I. Linzer Distinguished University Professor at Northwestern University, the director of the Center for Interdisciplinary Exploration and Research in Astrophysics (CIERA), a member of the council of the University of Crete, and the founding director of the NSF-Simons AI Institute for the Sky (NSF-Simons SkAI). She is a leading member of the LIGO Collaboration that observed gravitational waves in 2015.

Kalogera is a leading theorist in the study of gravitational waves, the emission of X-rays from compact binary objects and the coalescence of neutron-star binaries.

== Early life and education ==
Kalogera was born in 1971 in Serres, Greece. She received her B.S. degree in physics in 1992 from the University of Thessaloniki. She attended the University of Illinois Urbana-Champaign for graduate school, where she completed her PhD in astronomy in 1997. She joined the Center for Astrophysics | Harvard & Smithsonian as a CfA postdoctoral fellow and was awarded the Clay Fellowship in 2000. She joined the faculty in the Department of Physics and Astronomy at Northwestern University in 2001.

== Career and research ==
Kalogera is the Daniel I. Linzer Distinguished University Professor at Northwestern University. She serves as the director of the Center for Interdisciplinary Exploration and Research in Astrophysics (CIERA). Her current research covers a range a topics in theoretical astrophysics, including the study of gravitational waves detected by LIGO, the development of models for X-ray binaries, LSST, and predicting the progenitors of supernovae.

In the 2022–25 cycle, Kalogera served as the vice president of the board of the Aspen Center for Physics. She was a trustee from 2014–2020.

In 2023, Kalogera was selected to chair Northwestern University's Data Science and Artificial Intelligence Steering Committee. In 2024, she became the founding director of the NSF-Simons AI Institute for the Sky (NSF-Simons SkAI), a multi-institution research institute dedicated to AI-empowered astronomy. Also in 2024, Kalogera played a key role in Northwestern University joining as a founding partner of the Giant Magellan Telescope (GMT) consortium, and she represents Northwestern on the consortium's Board of Directors.

== Awards and honors ==
- Legacy Fellow, American Astronomical Society, 2020
- Crain's Chicago Business Notable Women in STEM, 2020
- Guggenheim Fellowship, John Simon Guggenheim Memorial Foundation, 2021
- Elected Member, American Academy of Arts and Sciences, 2021
- Elected Fellow, American Association for the Advancement of Science, 2019
- Elected Member, US National Academy of Sciences, 2018
- Dannie Heineman Prize for Astrophysics, 2018. The award, administered by the American Institute of Physics and the American Astronomical Society, cites Kalogera's "fundamental contributions to advancing our understanding of the evolution and fate of compact objects in binary systems, with particular regard to their electromagnetic and gravitational wave signals."
- Senior Fellow (2017–2021), CIFAR, Gravity and the Extreme Universe Program, 2017
- Martin E. and Gertrude G. Walder Award for Research Excellence, Northwestern University, 2017
- Hans A. Bethe Prize, 2016. The award, administered by the American Physical Society, cites Kalogera's "key contributions to the study of the electromagnetic and gravitational wave radiation from binary compact objects, including the now-verified prediction that neutron star mergers produce short gamma-ray bursts that will be found in all galaxy types."
- Simons Foundation Fellow in Theoretical Astrophysics, 2012
- Kavli Fellow, Kavli Frontiers of Science German-American Symposium, National Academy of Sciences, 2009
- Fellow, American Physical Society, 2008. Nominated by the Division of Astrophysics for "fundamental contributions to understanding the structure, formation and evolution of compact objects in binary systems, using X-ray and radio observations to study their importance for gravitational wave detectors."
- Maria Goeppert-Mayer Award, American Physical Society, 2008
- Selected as one of Astronomy Magazine's "10 Rising Stars of Astronomy", 2008
- National Science Foundation Faculty Early Career Development Program (CAREER) Award in Astronomy, Theoretical Studies of Compact Objects in Binary Systems, 2005
- Cottrell Scholar Award, Research Corporation for Science Advancement, 2004
- Annie Jump Cannon Award, American Astronomical Society, for outstanding research and promise for future research by a postdoctoral woman researcher, 2002
- Packard Fellowship for Science and Engineering, David and Lucile Packard Foundation, 2002
