= Flying Bison Brewing Company =

Brewery in Buffalo, New York, USA

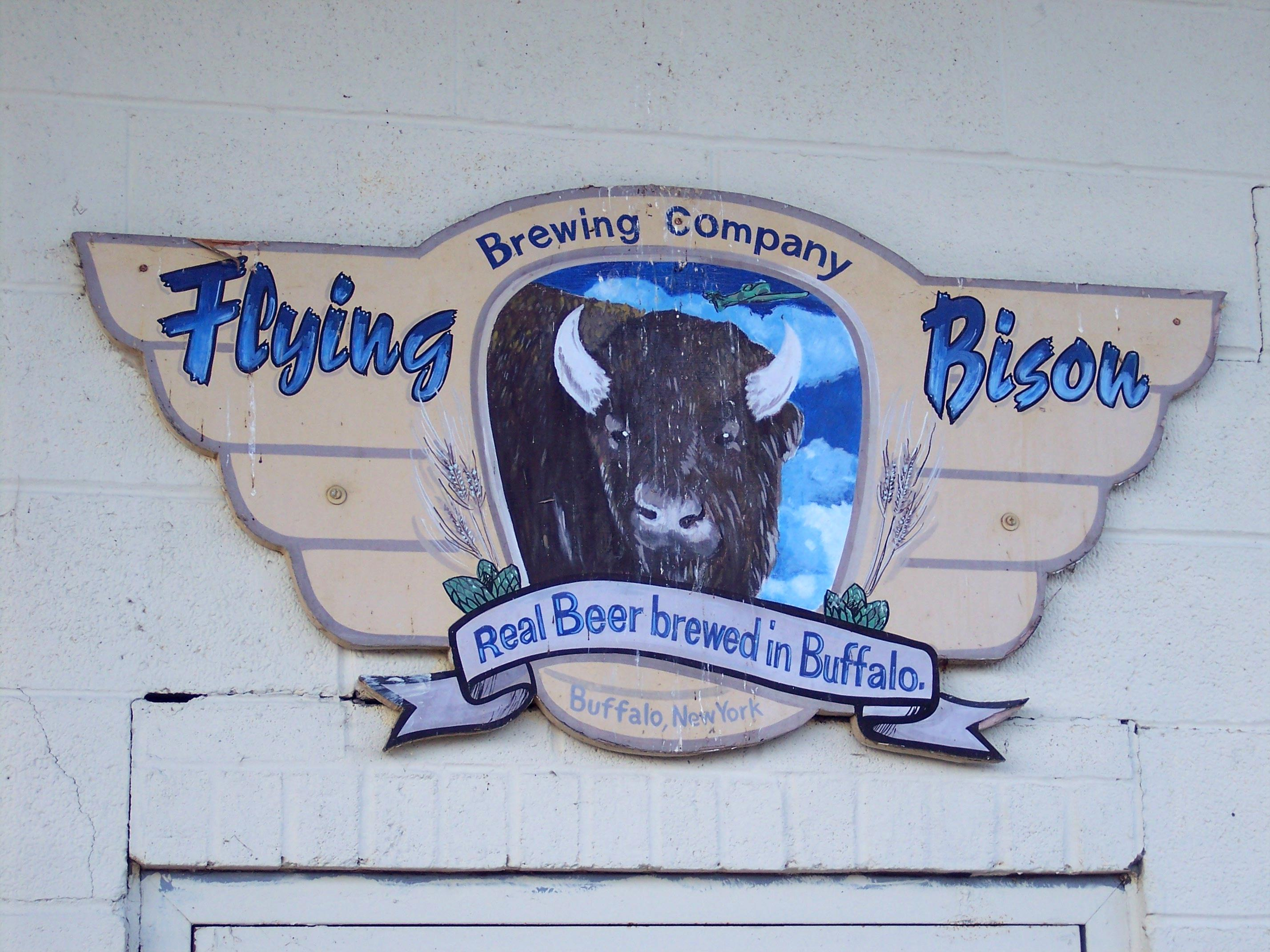
- Industry: Alcoholic beverage
- Founded: 2000
- Headquarters: Buffalo, New York; United States
- Products: Beer
- Owner: F. X. Matt Brewing Co.
- Website: www.flyingbisonbrewing.com

Flying Bison Brewing Company is a brewery in Buffalo, New York, United States. The brewery incorporated in 1995, opened for business in 2000, was started by two majority partners, Phil Internicola and Tim Herzog, along with 25 individual investors.

The brewery began operations as a 20-barrel facility. In early 2004, it installed a full bottling line and upgraded its production capacity by adding a 40 barrel fermenter. The brewery has since expanded by more than 200% adding 4 more 40 barrel fermenters. It presently distributes its products to bars, restaurants and retail outlets in Erie, Niagara, and Chautauqua counties. Flying Bison is the first stand-alone brewery to operate in Buffalo since the Iroquois Brewing Company closed in 1972.

Flying Bison draws its name in part from Buffalo's rich history of aviation manufacturing. The brewery's Dawn Patrol Gold Kölsch is named in honor of the Curtiss JN-4 "Jenny" biplane that was built in a factory on Niagara Street in Buffalo and flew dawn patrols off the east coast of England during World War I.

Flying Bison attributed a rise in the cost of ingredients to severe financial difficulty which caused a brief halt in production in 2010. A sale of the brewery to F. X. Matt Brewing Co., the Utica, New York-based makers of Saranac beer rescued the brewery. The terms of the sale stated that Matt was a parent company and that production would continue in Buffalo.

In 2014, the company announced their intention to build a new brewery in the Larkinville district of Buffalo, vacating their longtime home on Ontario Street. The new brewery is expected to open in the fall of 2014. It will increase their output to as much as 10,000 BBL annually, grow jobs from ten to 16 employees, and add a taproom and patio space for events and sales by the pint. The relocation has been done.

Flying Bison beers distributed in Western New York by Try-It Distributing can be found at Wegmans Food Markets, Consumer's Beverages, which is a local beer store chain in the Buffalo area, and many establishments throughout Western New York.

== See also ==
- Beer in the United States
