= Bernard Sadoulet =

French physicist

Bernard Sadoulet (born 23 April 1944 in Nice) is a French physicist.

Sadoulet studied from 1963 to 1965 at the École polytechnique and received his doctorate in 1971 at University of Paris-Sud in Orsay. From 1966 to 1973, he worked at CERN and from 1976 at Lawrence Berkeley National Laboratory. He was involved in the design of the UA1 detector at CERN.

In the 1990s and 2000s, he was engaged in the search for dark matter in the form of WIMPs. He developed cryogenic detectors to discover these WIMPs through the phonons they generated by collisions in crystals. Specifically, he initiated the Cryogenic Dark Matter Search (CDMS) experiments at the Soudan Underground Laboratory in Minnesota with Blas Cabrera Navarro.

In 2013 he received the Panofsky Prize with Blas Cabrera. Sadoulet is a Fellow of the American Physical Society, the American Academy of Arts and Sciences, and the American Association for the Advancement of Science. In 2012, he was elected a member of the National Academy of Sciences. Since 1985, he has been a professor at the University of California, Berkeley. From 1989 to 2001, he was director of the Center for Particle Astrophysics. He is currently the director of the LBNL Institute for Nuclear and Particle Astrophysics and Cosmology (INPA).

His doctoral students include Vuk Mandic.

== Selected publications ==
- with Joel Primack, D. Seckel: Detection of Cosmic Dark Matter, Ann. Rev. Nucl. Part Sci., Vol. 38, 1988, pp. 751–807 doi:10.1146/annurev.ns.38.120188.003535
