= Valentina Harizanov =

Serbian-American mathematician

- Education: University of Wisconsin, Madison, University of Belgrade
- Known for: Research in computability theory
- Awards: Oscar and Shoshana Trachtenberg Prize for Faculty Scholarship (2016)
- Scientific career
- Fields: Mathematics, Computability Theory
- Workplaces: The George Washington University
- Thesis: Degree Spectrum of a Recursive Relation on a Recursive Structure (1987)
- Doctoral advisor: Terry Millar

Valentina Harizanov is a Serbian-American mathematician and professor of mathematics at The George Washington University. Her main research contributions are in computable structure theory (roughly at the intersection of computability theory and model theory), where she introduced the notion of degree spectra of relations on computable structures and obtained the first significant results concerning uncountable, countable, and finite Turing degree spectra. Her recent interests include algorithmic learning theory and spaces of orders on groups.

== Education ==
She obtained her Bachelor of Science in mathematics in 1978 at the University of Belgrade and her Ph.D. in mathematics in 1987 at the University of Wisconsin–Madison under the direction of Terry Millar.

== Career ==
At The George Washington University, Harizanov was an assistant professor of mathematics from 1987 to 1993, an associate professor of mathematics from 1994 to 2002, and a professor of mathematics from 2003 to the present. She has held two visiting professor positions, one in 1994 at the University of Maryland, College Park and one in 2014 at the Kurt Gödel Research Center at the University of Vienna.

Harizanov has co-directed the Center for Quantum Computing, Information, Logic, and Topology at The George Washington University since 2011.

== Research ==
In 2009, Harizanov received a grant from the National Science Foundation to research how algebraic, topological, and algorithmic properties of mathematical structures relate.

== Awards and honors ==
Harizanov won the Oscar and Shoshana Trachtenberg Prize for Faculty Scholarship from The George Washington University (GWU) in 2016. This award is presented each year to a tenured GWU faculty member to recognize outstanding research accomplishments. She was named MSRI Eisenbud Professor for Fall 2020.

== Publications ==
Harizanov has over 40 publications in peer-reviewed journals, including

- V.S. Harizanov, "Some effects of Ash-Nerode and other decidability conditions on degree spectra " Annals of Pure and Applied Logic 55 (1), pp. 51–65 (1991), cited 21 times according to Web of Science

In addition, she has published the following book-length survey paper and co-edited, co-authored book:

- V.S. Harizanov, “Pure computable model theory,” in the volume: Handbook of Recursive Mathematics, vol. 1, Yu.L. Ershov, S.S. Goncharov, A. Nerode, and J.B. Remmel, editors (North-Holland, Amsterdam, 1998), pp. 3–114.
- M. Friend, N.B. Goethe, and V.S. Harizanov, Induction, Algorithmic Learning Theory, and Philosophy, Series: Logic, Epistemology, and the Unity of Science, vol. 9, Springer, Dordrecht, 304 pp., 2007.

Degree spectra of relations are introduced and first studied in Harizanov's dissertation: Degree Spectrum of a Recursive Relation on a Recursive Structure(1987).
