= Jonathan M. Dorfan =

South African-born American particle physicist and president-emeritus of the OIST

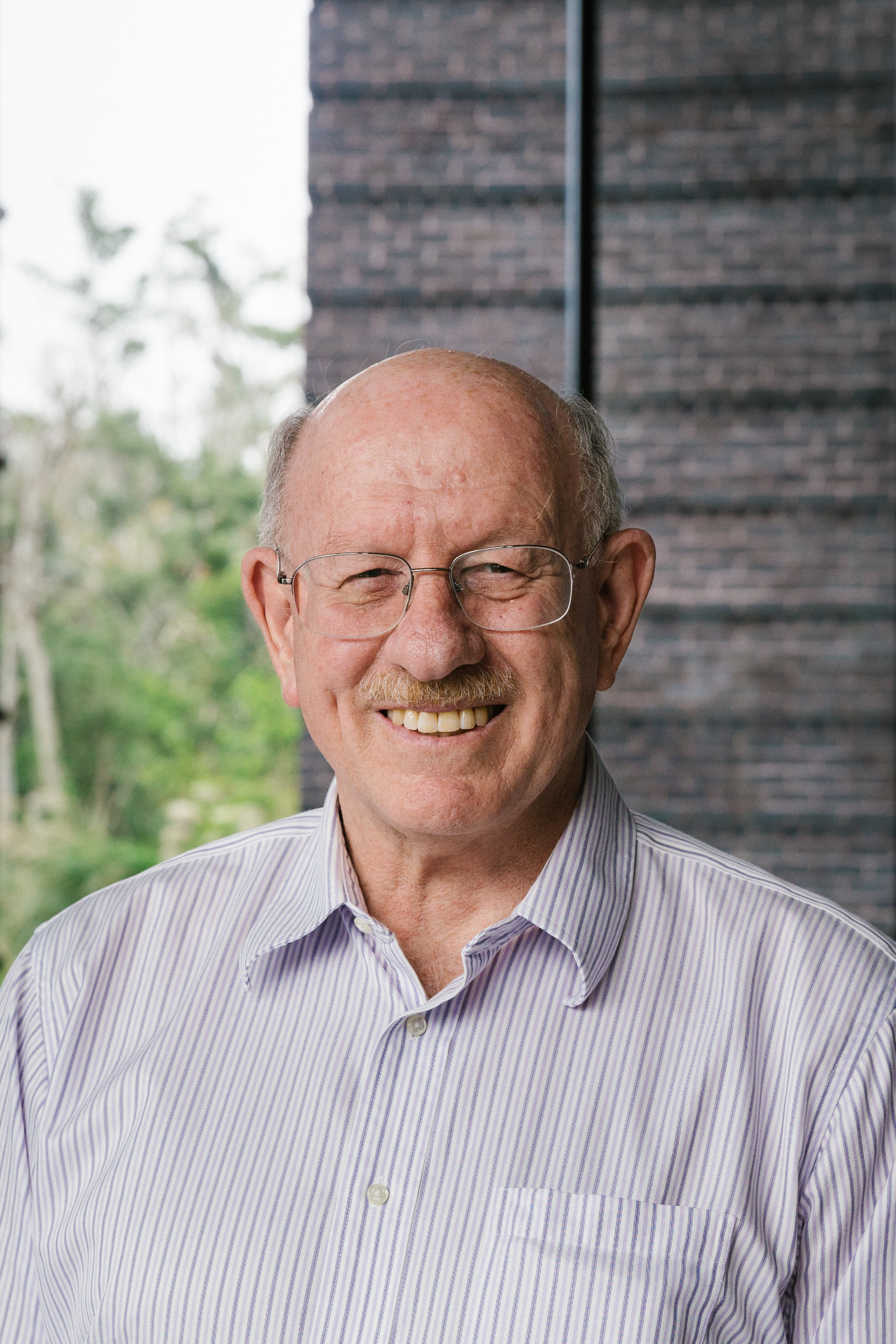
- Born: 10 October 1947 (age 78); Cape Town, South Africa
- Citizenship: United States
- Education: UC Irvine; University of Cape Town
- Known for: Former Director, SLAC; Former President, Okinawa Institute of Science and Technology
- Awards: Order of the Rising Sun (2017)
- Scientific career
- Fields: Particle physics
- Workplaces: SLAC

Jonathan Manne Dorfan (born October 10, 1947) is a particle physicist and the President-Emeritus of the Okinawa Institute of Science and Technology, Graduate University. He is a former director of the Stanford Linear Accelerator Center (1999–2007; SLAC). In 2010 he joined the Okinawa Institute of Science and Technology as President. In 2017 he was awarded Japan's Order of the Rising Sun.

== Education and career ==
He received his B.Sc. at the University of Cape Town in South Africa in 1969 and his Ph.D. from the University of California, Irvine in 1976. Thereafter he worked on various projects at the Stanford Linear Accelerator Center (SLAC) including the Mark II detector and BaBar experiment before becoming director in 1999.

Dorfan was named president-elect of the Okinawa Institute of Science and Technology (OIST) Graduate University in Okinawa, Japan in 2010, and he became president of the new university in November 2011. He has been credited with significantly expanding the faculty of the university, especially in the physical sciences.

== Advisory boards ==
He has served on numerous advisory boards, including:

- Graduate School of the Institute of Science and Technology Austria (2019)
- High Energy Physics Advisory Panel of the U.S. Department of Energy (1991-1994)
- Scientific Advisory Board of the Max Planck Institute for Physics (2000–present)
- International Committee for Future Accelerators, a working group of the International Union of Pure and Applied Physics (2003–2005)
- Board of Governors for the Weizmann Institute of Science (2005–present)
- Accelerator Advisory Panel of the International Linear Collider Global Design Effort (2007-2010)
- Machine Advisory Committee for Italy's SuperB Project (2008–present)
- Advisory Board of the John Adams Institute for Accelerator Science, Oxford University (2009-2010)
- Board of Governors and Board of Councillors of the Okinawa Institute of Science and Technology (2010–present)

== Awards ==
In 2008 he was awarded an honorary DSc from the University of Cape Town and in 2009 Technische Universität Dresden awarded him an honorary doctorate.

Dorfan was awarded the American Physical Society's 2016 W.K.H. Panofsky Prize in Experimental Particle Physics. The official citation states, "For leadership in the BABAR and Belle experiments, which established the violation of CP symmetry in B meson decay, and furthered our understanding of quark mixing and quantum chromodynamics". Drs. David Hitlin, Stephen Olsen and Fumihiko Takasaki were co-awardees.

On 7 November 2017, the Emperor of Japan, awarded Dr. Jonathan Dorfan, President Emeritus of the Okinawa Institute of Science and Technology Graduate University (OIST), the Order of the Rising Sun, Gold and Silver Star, one of Japan's most distinguished national decorations. The official citation states that the decoration is in recognition of "contributions to the development of our nation's research and education in science and technology".

== External references ==
- JM Dorfan on GoogleScholar
- Oral History Interview with Jonathan Dorfan by David Zierler on 2020 September 2, American Institute of Physics, Niels Bohr Library & Archives

| Preceded by Burton Richter | SLAC Director; 1999 – 2007 | Succeeded by Persis Drell |
