= Wes Smith =

Wes Smith may refer to:

- Wes Smith (American football), wide receiver in the National Football League
- Wes Smith (Australian footballer) (born 1945), Australian rules footballer
- Wes Smith (curler) (born 1940), American wheelchair curler

== See also ==
- Wesley Smith (disambiguation)
