= Eugene W. Beier =

American physicist

Eugene William Beier (born 30 January 1940 in Harvey, Illinois) is an American physicist.

Beier received in 1961 his bachelor's degree from Stanford University and in 1963 his M.S. and in 1966 his Ph.D., with advisor Louis J. Koester Jr., from the University of Illinois at Urbana–Champaign with thesis A search for heavy leptons using a differential Cherenkov counter. He became in 1967 an assistant professor and in 1979 a full professor at the University of Pennsylvania.

Beier has worked, since the end of the 1970s, on neutrino physics, first at Brookhaven National Laboratory (Experiment 734) and then, starting in 1984, on the science team of Kamiokande II.

In 1984 Professor Beier joined with other scientists from the University of Pennsylvania and from a group of Japanese institutions in the Kamiokande II experiment. The goal of this work was to use the sun as a source of neutrinos for studying their fundamental properties. This collaboration was quite successful, resulting in 1) observation of neutrinos from the supernova SN1987a, 2) the first direct measurement of neutrinos emitted by the sun, and 3) observation of an unexpected result in the ratio of electron neutrino to muon neutrino interactions from cosmic ray neutrinos produced in the earth's atmosphere. In 1998, the Super-Kamiokande collaboration determined that the atmospheric neutrino effect was due to neutrino oscillations.

In 1987 Beier joined the science team at the Sudbury Neutrino Observatory (SNO). He was co-spokesperson for the United States collaborators (along with R. G. H. Robertson of the University of Washington) working on the Sudbury Neutrino Observatory. The SNO science team provided strong evidence for solar neutrino flavor transformation. This flavor transformation implies that neutrinos have non-zero masses. The total flux of all neutrino flavors measured by SNO agrees well with the best theoretical models of the Sun.

His current research deals with the question of whether neutrinos are their own anti-particles; the investigation involves searching for the rare (and perhaps entirely hypothetical) neutrino-less double beta decay occurring within atomic nuclei.

In 2010 Beier received the Panofsky Prize. Also, he was chair of the Division of Particles and Fields of the American Physical Society in 2000. He was a member of the International Committee for Future Accelerators 1998–2000, a working group of the International Union of Pure and Applied Physics. For the academic year 1998–1999 he was a Guggenheim Fellow. He is a Fellow of the American Physical Society. In 1989 the Bruno Rossi Prize was awarded to the Kamiokande II team (and the Irvine-Michigan-Brookhaven team).

The Kamiokande II work and especially the observation from Supernova 1987a led to the award of the 2002 Nobel Prize in Physics to Masatoshi Koshiba. The Kamiokande II work (i.e. observation of an unexpected result in the ratio of electron neutrino to muon neutrino interactions from cosmic ray neutrinos produced in the Earth's atmosphere) extended by the 1998 work by SuperKamiokande, along with the work of the science team in the Sudbury Neutrino Observatory, led to the 2015 award of the Nobel Prize in Physics to Takaaki Kajita and Arthur B. McDonald.

== Selected publications ==
- New Limit on the Strength of Mixing between ν_{μ} and ν_{e}, L. A. Ahrens, et al., (Brookhaven E734 Collaboration), Phys. Rev. D 31, 2732-36 (1985). doi:10.1103/PhysRevD.31.2732
- Measurement of Neutrino-Proton and Antineutrino-Proton Elastic Scattering, L. A. Ahrens, et al., (Brookhaven E734 Collaboration), Phys. Rev. D 35, 785-809 (1987). doi:10.1103/PhysRevD.35.785
- Observation of a Neutrino Burst From the Supernova SN1987A, K. Hirata, et al., (Kamiokande II Collaboration), Phys. Rev. Lett. 58, 1490-93 (1987). doi:10.1103/PhysRevLett.58.1490
- Experimental Study of the Atmospheric Neutrino Flux, Kamiokande-II Collaboration (K.S. Hirata (Tokyo U., ICEPP) et al.). 1988. 17 pp. Published in Phys. Lett. B 205 (1988) 416 doi:10.1016/0370-2693(88)91690-5
- Determination of electroweak parameters from the elastic scattering of muon neutrinos and antineutrinos on electrons, L.A. Ahrens, et al., (Brookhaven E734 Collaboration), Phys. Rev. D 41 3297-3316, (1990). doi:10.1103/PhysRevD.41.3297
- Real-time, directional measurement of ^{8}B solar neutrinos in the Kamiokande II detector, K.S. Hirata, et al., (Kamiokande II Collaboration), Phys. Rev. D 44, 2241-60 (1991). doi:10.1103/PhysRevD.44.2241
- Observation of a small atmospheric muon-neutrino / electron-neutrino ratio in Kamiokande, Kamiokande-II Collaboration (K.S. Hirata (Tokyo U., ICRR) et al.). Jan 1992. 13 pp. Published in Phys. Lett. B 280 (1992) 146-152 doi:10.1016/0370-2693(92)90788-6
- Atmospheric ν_{μ}/ν_{e} Ratio in the multi-GeV Range, Y. Fukuda, et al., (Kamiokande II Collaboration), Phys. Lett. B 335, 237-245 (1994). doi:10.1016/0370-2693(94)91420-6
- The Sudbury neutrino observatory, SNO Collaboration (J. Boger (Brookhaven) et al.). Oct 1999. 58 pp. Published in Nucl. Instrum. Methods A 449 (2000) 172-207 doi:10.1016/S0168-9002(99)01469-2
- Measurement of the Rate of ν_{e} + d —> p + p + e^{–} Interactions Produced by ^{8}B Solar Neutrinos at the Sudbury Neutrino Observatory, Q.R. Ahmad et al. (the SNO Collaboration), Phys. Rev. Lett., 87071301/1-6 (2001). doi:10.1103/PhysRevLett.87.071301
- Direct evidence for neutrino flavor transformation from neutral-current interactions in the Sudbury Neutrino Observatory, Q.R. Ahmad, et al. (The SNO Collaboration), Phys. Rev. Lett. 89 011301/1-6 (2002). doi:10.1103/PhysRevLett.89.011301
- Measurement of day and night neutrino energy spectra at SNO and constraints on neutrino mixing parameters, Q.R. Ahmad, et al. (The SNO Collaboration), Phys. Rev. Lett. 89 011302/1-5 (2002). doi:10.1103/PhysRevLett.89.011302
- Measurement of the total active ^{8}B solar neutrino flux at the Sudbury Neutrino Observatory with enhanced neutral current sensitivity
- SNO Collaboration (S.N. Ahmed et al.). Sep 2003. 5 pp. Published in Phys. Rev. Lett. 92 (2004) 181301 doi:10.1103/PhysRevLett.92.181301
- Aharmim, B.; Ahmed, S. N.; Anthony, A. E.; Beier, E. W.; et al. (30 November 2005). "Electron energy spectra, fluxes, and day-night asymmetries of8B solar neutrinos from measurements with NaCl dissolved in the heavy-water detector at the Sudbury Neutrino Observatory". Physical Review C. 72 (5) 055502. American Physical Society (APS). arXiv:nucl-ex/0502021. Bibcode:2005PhRvC..72e5502A. doi:10.1103/physrevc.72.055502. ISSN 0556-2813. S2CID 119350768.
