= Joel Butler =

Experimental physicist

- Born: Joel N. Butler
- Education: Harvard University, MIT
- Known for: Particle Physics
- Scientific career
- Fields: Physics
- Workplaces: Fermilab, CERN
- Doctoral advisor: Lawrence Rosenson

Joel Butler is an experimental physicist known for his contributions to the field of particle physics, particularly for his leadership roles in fixed target quark flavor experiments at Fermilab and collider physics at CERN's Large Hadron Collider.

== Education ==
Butler received his undergraduate degree in physics from Harvard University and his PhD in experimental particle physics from the Massachusetts Institute of Technology in 1975. His thesis advisor was Lawrence Rosenson, and he performed his thesis research using Fermilab's Single Arm Spectrometer Facility. His thesis was titled "Elastic Scattering of Positive Pions, Kaons, and Protons from 50-GeV/c to 175-GeV/c."

== Career ==
Butler began working at Fermilab in 1979, where he led experiments, was one of the co-founders of the lab’s Computing Division, and served on the High Energy Physics Advisory Panel. In 1990, Butler became a fellow of the American Physical Society "for his leadership in the study of charm quark states."

In 2005, Butler joined CERN's Compact Muon Solenoid (CMS) experiment, one of the world’s largest physics experiments. During his time with CMS, he oversaw the construction of the US-funded forward pixel detector. He also managed the US CMS Operations Program from 2007 until 2013. In 2016, he became spokesperson for the CMS experiment. He served in this role until 2018.

The APS awarded Butler the 2026 W.K.H. Panofsky Prize in Experimental Particle Physics "for wide-ranging scientific, technical, and strategic contributions to particle physics, particularly exceptional leadership in fixed target quark flavor experiments at Fermilab and collider physics at the Large Hadron Collider."

== Honors and awards ==
- American Physical Society Fellowship in the Division of Particles and Fields (1990)
- American Physical Society W.K.H. Panofsky Prize in Experimental Particle Physics (2026)
