= Vuk Mandić =

Serbian-American astrophysicist

Vuk Mandić (born April 20, 1975, in Priboj, Serbia) is a Serbian-American astrophysicist and professor of physics and astronomy at the University of Minnesota. In 2017 he was elected a Fellow of the American Physical Society (APS).

== Biography ==
He grew up in Podgorica, where he received his elementary and secondary education. For his university education, he went to the United States. He graduated in 1998 with a B.S. in physics and mathematics from California Institute of Technology (Caltech) and in 2004 with a Ph.D. in physics from the University of California, Berkeley. His Ph.D. thesis advisor was Bernard Sadoulet.

From 2004 to 2007 Mandic was supported by a Millikan Postdoctoral Fellowship at Caltech to work on the LIGO project to search for gravitational waves. In 2007 he became a faculty member in the department of physics and astronomy at the University of Minnesota, where he now is a Distinguished McKnight University Professor.

In August 2017 he was part of the team that detected the GW170817 gravitational wave signal.

He has chaired or co-chaired several committees for LIGO and for the Super Cryogenic Dark Matter Search.

Mandic's research combines general relativity theory, astrophysics, and astronomy. His collaborations with various scientific teams have resulted in more than 350 publications with cumulative citations over 92,000. His 2017 APS Fellowship citation is for "significant contributions to searches for primordial gravitational waves using LIGO data and for pioneering studies of the ultimate limits to low frequency sensitivity of ground based gravitational wave detectors".
