= Lawrence Sulak =

- Born: August 29, 1944 (age 82)
- Education: Carnegie Mellon University (B.A.); Princeton University (M.A., Ph.D.)
- Awards: W.K.H. Panofsky Prize in Experimental Particle Physics (2018)
- Scientific career
- Fields: Particle physics
- Thesis: A precise measurement of the K°₁ - K°₂ mass difference (1970)

Lawrence Sulak (born August 29, 1944) is an American physicist, currently the David M. Myers Distinguished Professor at Boston University. Some of Sulak's research includes Higgs detection at the Compact Muon Solenoid in the Large Hadron Collider, neutrino physics, astrophysics, and contributing work for the Monopole, Astrophysics and Cosmic Ray Observatory.

== Early life and education ==
Sulak was born in 1944. He did a Bachelor of Arts at Carnegie Mellon University, and then his M.A. and Ph.D. from at Princeton University. His dissertation is titled A precise measurement of the K°₁ - K°₂ mass difference.

== Career ==
Following his PhD, Sulak's work in the early 1970s are described by Peter Galison in a history of neutral currents which appeared in Reviews of Modern Physics.

Sulak is mentioned in the 1986 book Second Creation on the history of modern particle physics by Robert Crease and Charles Mann. It opens with a description of being escorted by Sulak down to the experimental halls of the salt mine under Lake Erie in Ohio converted to a proton decay detector designed by Sulak and the rest of the Irvine Michigan Brookhaven collaboration.

== Awards ==
Some of Sulak's awards that he has received include:

- W.K.H. Panofsky Prize in Experimental Particle Physics (2018)
