= Charles Prescott =

Charles Prescott may refer to:

- Charles John Prescott (1857–1946), English born Australian army chaplain, Methodist minister and headmaster
- Charles Ramage Prescott (1772–1859), merchant, noted horticulturalist and political figure in Nova Scotia
- Charles Y. Prescott (born 1938), American particle physicist
