= Elihu Abrahams =

American theoretical physicist (1927–2018)

- Born: April 3, 1927; Port Henry, New York
- Died: October 18, 2018 (aged 91); Los Angeles, California
- Education: University of California, Berkeley (PhD)
- Known for: Theoretical condensed matter
- Spouse: Geulah Abrahams
- Children: David; Jonathan Abrahams
- Awards: 2019 Oliver E. Buckley Condensed Matter Physics Prize
- Scientific career
- Fields: Condensed matter physics
- Workplaces: University of Illinois, Urbana-Champaign; Rutgers University; UCLA
- Doctoral advisor: Charles Kittel

Elihu Abrahams (April 3, 1927 – October 18, 2018) was an American theoretical physicist, specializing in condensed matter physics.

Abrahams attended Brooklyn Technical High School, graduating in 1944. In 1947, Abrahams received his bachelor's degree and in 1952 his PhD, with Charles Kittel as thesis advisor, from the University of California, Berkeley with thesis Spin-lattice relaxation in ferromagnetics. From 1952 to 1953, he was a research associate in physics at UC Berkeley. He was in 1953–1955 a research associate and in 1955–1956 an assistant professor at the University of Illinois, Urbana-Champaign. In 1956, he became an assistant professor, then an associate professor, and in 1964 a full professor at Rutgers University.

From 1979 to 1983, he was the president of the Aspen Center for Physics.

In 1979, Abrahams, Philip W. Anderson, Donald Licciardello, and T.V. Ramakrishnan published the highly influential paper "Scaling Theory of Localization: Absence of Quantum Diffusion in Two Dimensions" in Physical Review Letters 42. Often referred to as the "gang of four paper" in physics circles, the authors proposed new, precise predictions about the behavior of electrons in disordered materials. In 2003, the American Physical Society named it among the top-ten most often cited papers published in the Physical Review.

Abrahams’ research is in theoretical condensed matter physics. His main interests concern the quantum-mechanical many-body problem in the presence of very strong particle-particle interactions. In this area, he has been using the techniques of quantum statistical mechanics and field theory to investigate the phase transitions and the transport and thermodynamic properties of a number of systems, including high-temperature cuprate superconductors, metals at the threshold of breakdown of Fermi-liquid behavior, iron pnictide superconductors, heavy-fermion metals, localized spins in metals, magnets with unusual spin correlations, and the disordered interacting electron fluid in two dimensions.

In 1964, Abrahams was elected a Fellow of the American Physical Society. He was a Guggenheim Fellow for the academic year 1986–1987. He was also elected to the National Academy of Sciences in 1987, and to the American Academy of Arts and Sciences in 1999. In 2018, he received the 2019 Oliver E. Buckley Condensed Matter Physics Prize for "pioneering research in the physics of disordered materials and hopping conductivity" together with Alexei L. Efros and Boris I. Shklovskii.

== Selected publications ==
- with C. Kittel: Dipolar broadening of magnetic resonance lines in magnetically diluted crystals. Physical Review, 1953 doi:10.1103/PhysRev.90.238
- with A. Miller: Impurity conduction at low concentrations. Physical Review, 1960 doi:10.1103/PhysRev.120.745
- with T. Tsuneto: Time variation of the Ginzburg-Landau order parameter. Physical Review, 1966 doi:10.1103/PhysRev.152.416
- with P.W. Anderson, D.C. Licciardello, T.V. Ramakrishnan: Scaling theory of localization: Absence of quantum diffusion in two dimensions. Physical Review Letters, 1979 doi:10.1103/PhysRevLett.42.673
- with P.W. Anderson, P.A. Lee, T.V. Ramakrishnan: Quasiparticle lifetime in disordered two-dimensional metals. Physical Review B, 1981 doi:10.1103/PhysRevB.24.6783
- with R.G. Palmer, D.L. Stein, P.W. Anderson: Models of hierarchically constrained dynamics for glassy relaxation. Physical Review Letters, 1984 doi:10.1103/PhysRevLett.53.958
- with C.M. Varma, S. Schmitt-Rink: Charge transfer excitations and superconductivity in “ionic” metals. Solid state communications, 1987 doi:10.1016/0038-1098(87)90407-8
- with S.V. Kravchenko, M.P. Sarachik: Metallic behavior and related phenomena in two dimensions. Reviews of Modern Physics, 2001 doi:10.1103/RevModPhys.73.251
- with S.Y. Savrasov, G. Kotliar: Correlated electrons in δ-plutonium within a dynamical mean-field picture. Nature, 2001 doi:10.1038/35071035
- with Q. Si: Strong correlations and magnetic frustration in the high T_{c} iron pnictides. Physical Review Letters, 2008 doi:10.1103/PhysRevLett.101.076401
