= Matt Brewing Company =

New York based brewing company

Coordinates: 43.1033926°N 75.2446173°W

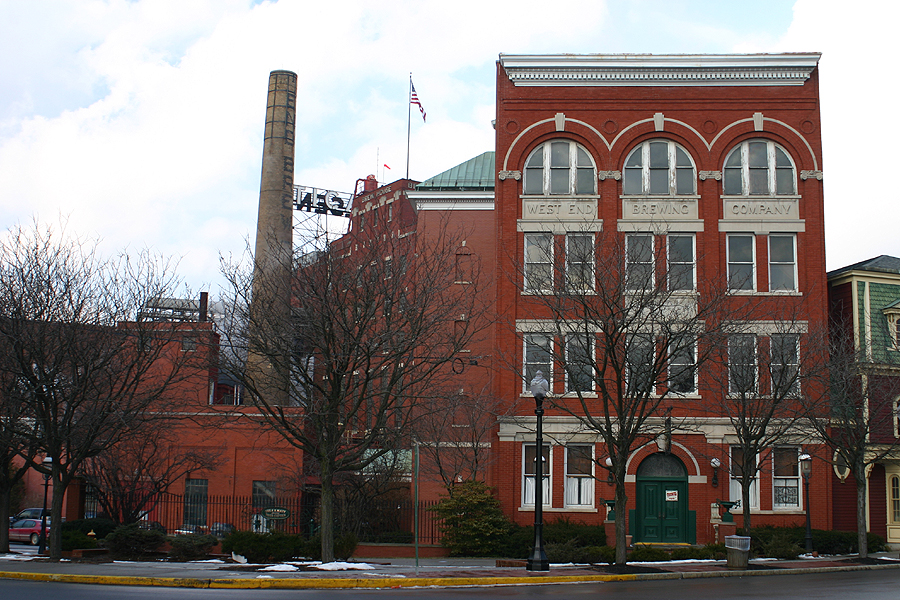
- Matt Brewery in west Utica
- Type: Private
- Industry: Brewing
- Predecessor: Charles Bierbauer Brewery
- Founded: 1888
- Founder: Francis Xavier Matt I
- Headquarters: 830 Varick Street, Utica, New York, United States
- Products: Beer, soft drinks
- Production output: 350,000 US beer barrels (410,000 hL) in 2014
- Subsidiaries: Flying Bison Brewing Company; Flying Dog Brewery
- Website: www.saranac.com

F.X. Matt Brewing Company is a family-owned brewery in Utica, New York. It is the fourth oldest family-owned brewery in the United States, having brewed beer since 1888. Its most popular product is the Saranac line of beers. It also sells soft drinks such as root beer and ginger beer.

== History ==
After working at the Rothaus Brewery in the Black Forest region of the Grand Duchy of Baden, Germany, Francis Xavier Matt I immigrated to the United States in 1880. In Utica, he worked at the Charles Bierbauer Brewery as lead salesman and brewmaster for several years, before reorganizing the business as The West End Brewing Company in 1888.

During Prohibition, the company remained in operation by producing soft drinks under the Utica Club label, and also made ginger ale and non-alcoholic malt tonics. It was also described as the first brewery in the United States to obtain a license to sell beer after the end of Prohibition.

The brewery, later renamed Matt Brewing Company, expanded its distribution in the Northeast around Utica Club and its current flagship beer, Saranac. The company is in its fourth generation of family ownership and is led by Nick Matt (chairman and CEO) and Fred Matt (president). The brewery is served by the New York, Susquehanna and Western Railway line running down the middle of Schuyler Street.

On May 29, 2008, a fire broke out in the packaging section of the F.X. Matt Brewery, reportedly caused by a spark from welding being done inside the building. The fire destroyed the second and third floor of the packing building and caused over $10 million in damage. Brewing and kegging of Utica Club resumed the following week. Canning operations temporarily moved to the High Falls Brewing Company (makers of Genesee beer) in Rochester, NY, until the damaged equipment could be replaced.

After the fire, brewery officials sought state grants to support a rebuilding effort and to restore operations. Nick Matt told the Utica Observer Dispatch in May 2009 that the reconstruction would allow equipment upgrades and additional warehousing space, alongside changes intended to streamline production.

Bottling returned to the F.X. Matt brewery after one month.

=== Marketing ===
After the end of Prohibition, Utica Club became the name of the brewery's flagship beer, promoted during the 1950s and 1960s. In 1959, two talking beer steins named "Schultz & Dooley", voiced by Jonathan Winters, were introduced to television audiences and were used as recurring advertising characters for the West End Brewing Company.

Another marketing element was the "Utica Club Natural Carbonation Band Beer Drinking Song". On March 21, 1968, members of the Utica Club sales team previewed a new campaign called "swings". Created by Wells, Rich, Greene, Inc., the campaign used television spots set in a fictional nightclub called the Utica Club, and introduced the song as part of the promotion; the piece has been attributed to composer Sasha Burland in later commentary.

== Family leadership ==
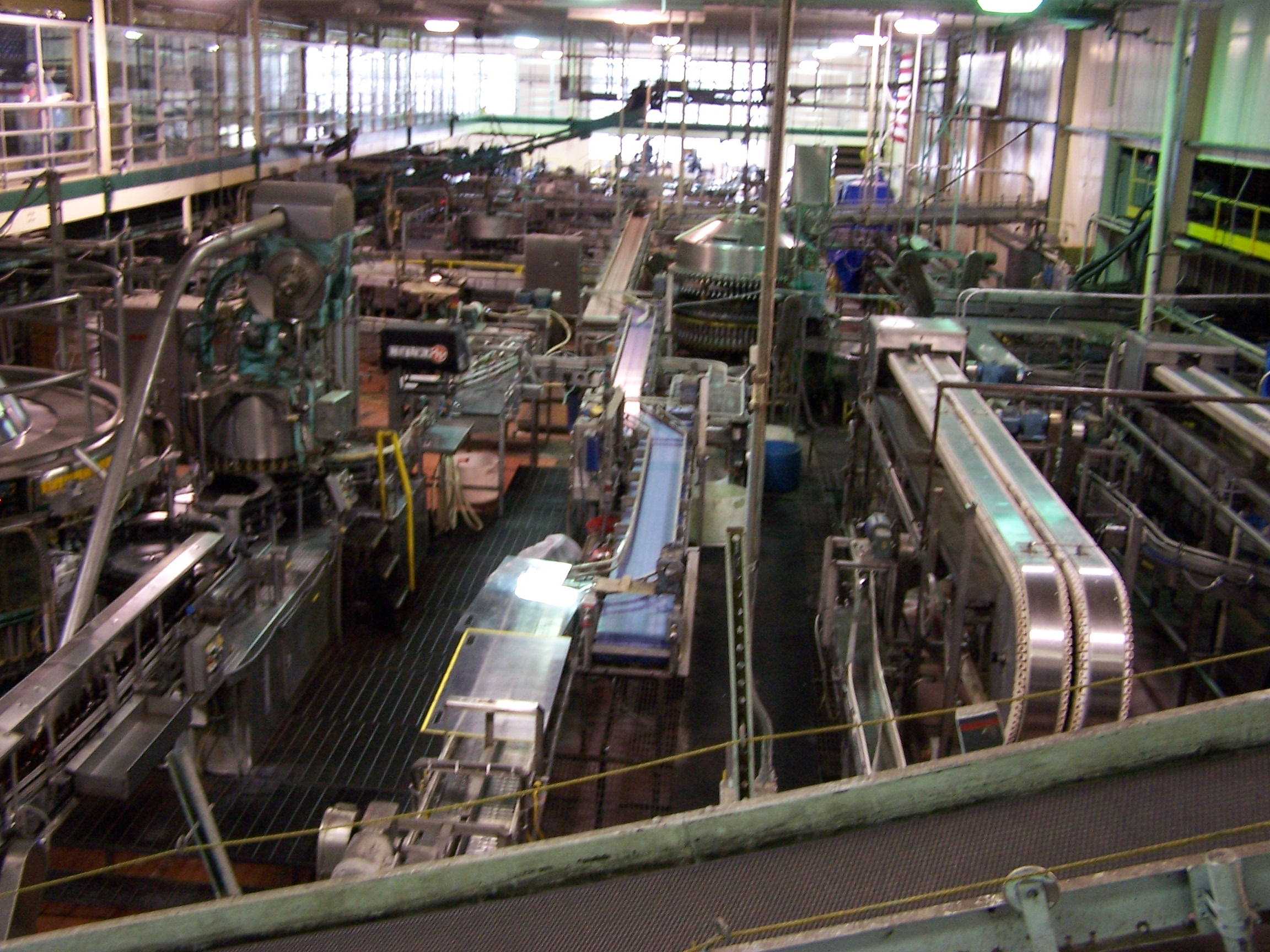
Floor of the Saranac Brewery

Francis Xavier Matt acquired his brewing expertise as a student of the Duke of Baden, and was considered a proficient brewer upon his arrival in the city of Utica in 1880. His grandson, F.X. Matt II, remarked that, under the duke's tutelage, F.X. Matt I gained brewing experience "as an art, not a science; as a way of life, not a way of making a living." Combining his talents with Charles Bierbauer, who was additionally skillful in old world brewing techniques, Matt nurtured a reputation in Utica's westside that resulted in his role as brewmaster, superintendent, and treasurer of a newly organized West End Brewing Company in 1888. F.X. Matt led the brewery until 1951.

Though F.X. Matt I stayed on to serve as brewery chairman until his death in 1958, his son Walter Matt began his tenure as president of the West End Brewery in 1951, serving in that role until 1980. Walter Matt modernized brewing operations. He also assisted in efforts to attract new businesses to the Utica area as the region entered its post-industrial period.

F.X. Matt II, upon becoming president of the family business in 1980, soon thereafter renamed the brewery the F.X. Matt Brewing Co. in recognition of his grandfather. Under his leadership, the brewery kept up with national trends, including the introduction of the Saranac brand in 1985. Upon the unveiling of Matt's Premium Light Beer in 1982, F.X. Matt II brought a poetic flair to the brewery's marketing:

Look out Bud! Look out Miller!
New Matt's Light is a giant killer
With taste that's great and body surprising
Look out you guys—a new sun is arising.

We're not very big compared to you
But we love our beer and know how to brew—
A great light beer—with malt and hops
Shove over guys—your monopoly stops

Competition with larger brewers, within the context of staying afloat in a Rust Belt city such as Utica, was a continual theme for the Matt Brewery throughout the 1980s. For example, in 1985, F.X. Matt II sponsored an open letter to then Utica Mayor Louis LaPolla which criticized the mayor for not featuring Matt products at a fundraiser hosted by LaPolla. Matt II admitted that not seeing local beverage products at the event "was a real blow to our pride", arguing that such oversights eliminated "the thought that it's in the community's self interest to be a booster of those products which it makes itself." Matt II had identified that the Matt Brewing Company was "in a war for [its] very survival", given that so many smaller breweries during that era were annexed or consolidated by larger brewing interests.

LaPolla and Matt II moved on to build a more positive relationship, and Matt Brewing Company continued to be a business anchor in the city, spurred particularly by the popularity of its Saranac line of beers among the growing market of microbrew or craft beer enthusiasts.

In order to maintain its market presence amidst the larger ongoing beer pricing war, F.X. Matt II developed a two-pronged strategy. First, Matt II initiated the new Saranac line of beers with the advice of notable brewmaster Joseph Owades (originator of the Light Beer formula). Second, teaming with families members, including his brother Nick, Matt II purchased the brewery from a family trust, subsequently reconfiguring the breweries corporate strategy with the ultimate goal of augmenting the Saranac brand. The Saranac brand eventually gained the brewery new esteem in the microbrew category of brewers, and a company that had seen sales of its beers plummet during the 1980s witnessed a doubling of sales during the early to mid-1990s.

F.X. Matt II served as brewery chairman until his death in 2001. Currently, the brewery is overseen by Nick Matt, chairman and CEO, with his nephew Fred Matt serving as president. The brewery continues to host, as it has for the past eleven years, Saranac Thursday Night, a weekly social event during the summer featuring beer, food, and live music, drawing thousands of people to Utica's Varick Street. As a result, the surrounding confines of the brewery has been marketed as the city's "Brewery District", which has witnessed a renaissance of local night spots and the addition of restaurants and live music venues.

The brewery also offers paid tours year round. Friday, Saturday, and Sunday from the gift shop. A tour lasts for about one hour and ends in the tasting room. Winter it is recommended to call ahead.

== Award winning beers ==
The Matt Brewery has produced thirty different beers in its Saranac line over the past two decades, which include Adirondack Lager (German amber lager), Black & Tan (stout/amber lager blend), Pale Ale (English pale ale), Black Forest (Bavarian Schwarzbier), India Pale Ale, Lager (traditional American lager), and a seasonal Belgian White (white beer). In addition to this the brewery has produced hundreds of test beers, earning the nickname "Beer of the Week".

The Saranac line of beers have been awarded several honors since its inception.

In addition to beers sold in traditional packaging, Saranac sells assorted beers in twelve packs as its Adirondack Trail Mix and seasonally as the Twelve Beers of Winter (called the Twelve Beers of Christmas until the 2006–2007 season). A number of family brands such as Kaltenberg, Black Cola, Two Dogs, and X.O. Premium Blend are all recognized products of the brewery.

In the late 1970s, Matt Brewery was one of the four breweries that produced Billy Beer. At the dawn of the craft-brewing movement in the mid-1980s, Matt began contract-brewing many of the East Coast's most successful brands: New Amsterdam Amber Beer, Pete's Wicked, Brooklyn Lager, Newman's Albany Amber, Dock Street Amber, Blue Moon, and Olde Heurich.

Matt Brewery brews beer for other brands on contract. While Matt's connection with Brooklyn Brewery and Pete's Brewing Company are well known, the company will not disclose any of its clients or how much beer it brews for competitors.

In addition to beer, Matt Brewery also distributes popular soft drinks, notably the Saranac 1888 Root Beer. Other drinks include diet Root Beer, Shirley Temple, Orange Cream, Ginger Beer, Black Cherry, and Sparkling Lemonade.

== Saranac Pale Ale ==
During the spring of 2007, the Washington Post provided a unique perspective on both the Saranac Pale Ale and on the Matt Brewery itself. Saranac Pale Ale was named a finalist in the newspaper's "Beer Madness" tasting, a competition that playfully mimics the NCAA Men's College Basketball Tournament. Though Saranac Pale Ale lost in the final round to Brooklyn Lager, Matt's Brewery inevitably walked away a victor, given that the brewery is a contract brewer for the Brooklyn beer company. Subsequently, authorities such as the Washington Post have dubbed the Pale Ale (first introduced in 1994) as the brewery's "flagship brand".

== Utica Club ==
Ultra Club logo

Utica Club is a 5.0% abv pale lager and has 137 calories per 12 US fl oz (355 mL) serving (1,620 kJ/L); introduced in 1933 at the West End Brewing Company (today the Matt Brewing Company). It was the first beer officially sold after Prohibition. It is a minor brand in comparison to the brewery's primary line of Saranac beers. Some affectionately refer to Utica Club as "Uncle Charlie", and to Utica Club Light as "Uncle Charlie Lewis".

"Schultz and Dooley"

Utica Club's most famous campaign icons were a pair of talking beer steins, "Schultz and Dooley", who appeared in several popular television commercials that ran from 1959 to 1964. DDB (Doyle Dane Bernbach) copywriter David Reider created the characters and comedian Jonathan Winters supplied the voices of Schultz, Dooley, and the other beer steins that appeared in the commercials. The original Schultz and Dooley steins in the commercials were actually made of wood by famous puppeteer Bil Baird. Many Utica Club commercials depicted two characters ending an argument abruptly on ordering a Utica Club beer, leading to the jingle "It's tough to argue over an Utica Club, 'cause they put too much love into it!" The original character steins were Shultz, a German with a mustache and a bright chrome pickelhaube, and Dooley, an Irishman, with red hair and a shamrock. The original steins have special markings below the handles and on the bottom to identify them from others. These original steins can go for as much as $1,200 in today's market. The F.X. Matt Brewery released over fifty different characters since the 1990s to 2012. Now they make different characters for a different range of people to enjoy.

Utica Club sales have seen a 9% sales increase from 2004 to 2005. USA Today reported in 2005 that sales increases of beers such as Utica Club and Pabst Blue Ribbon are part of a retro beer trend among younger drinkers.

== Subsidiaries ==
In 2010, Matt Brewing Company purchased Flying Bison Brewing Company of Buffalo, New York, rescuing the brewery from financial hardship. In May 2023, it purchased the Flying Dog Brewery of Frederick, Maryland.

== Brewhouse Expansion Project ==
In January 2019, Matt Brewing Company and Briggs of Burton completed the first mash in the new brewhouse.
