= Frederick Brewing Company =

Brewery in Frederick, Maryland

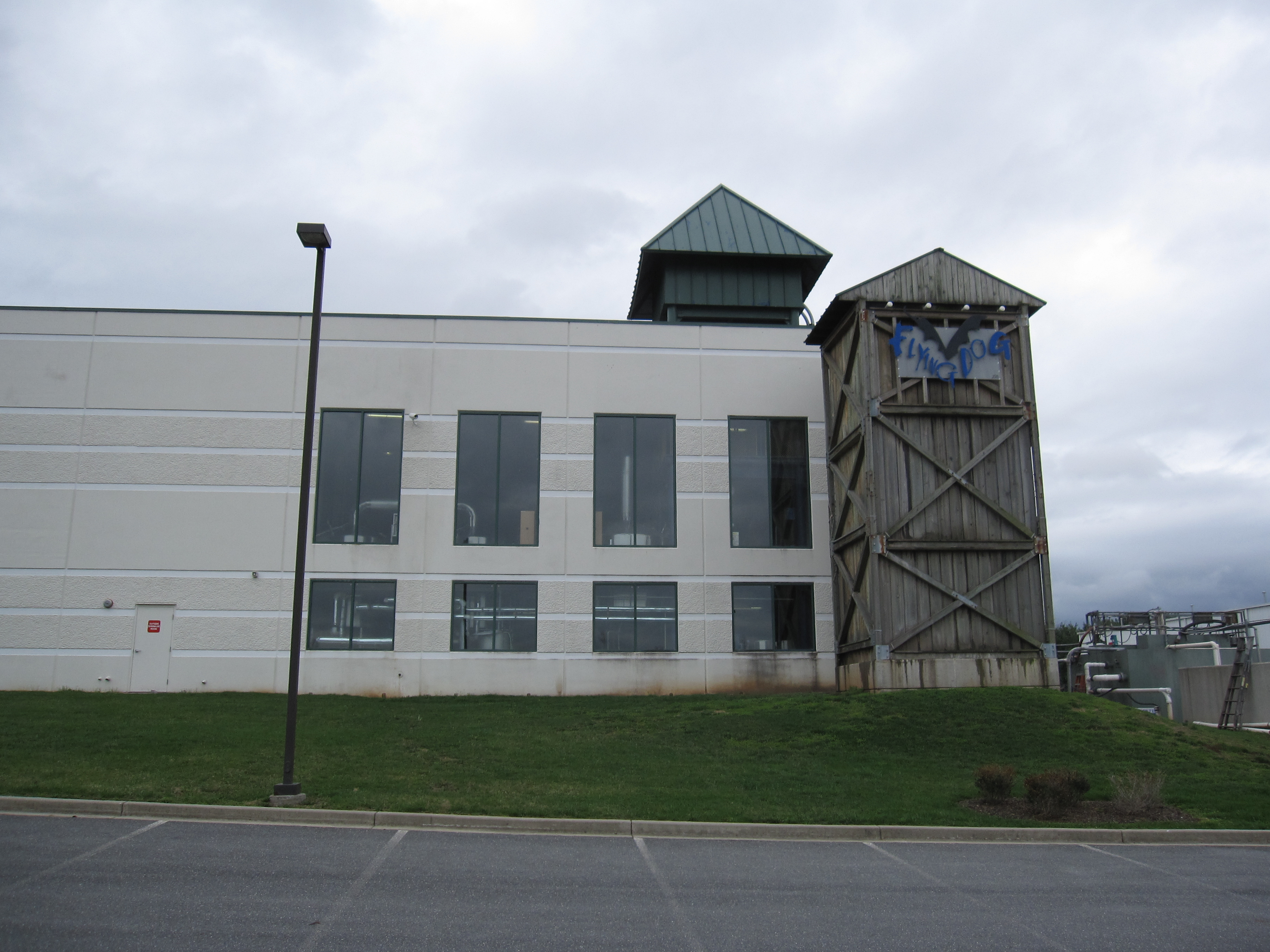
- Formerly: Wild Goose Brewery
- Type: Public
- Traded as: Formerly; OTC: BLUE; Nasdaq: FRBW
- Industry: Microbrewery
- Founder: Marjorie McGinnis, Kevin Brannon, Steve Nordahl and Steven Tluszcz
- Headquarters: Frederick, Maryland, United States
- Products: Beer

Frederick Brewing Company (at one point also known as Wild Goose Brewery) was a brewery at the Wedgewood Business Park in Frederick, Maryland, United States. It was founded sometime between 1992 and 1993 by Marjorie McGinnis, Kevin Brannon, Steve Nordahl, and Steven Tluszcz and had its grand opening on 12 February 1997. The company was taken over by Snyder International Brewing Group in 1999 and merged with Snyder International Brewing Group in 2001. In early 2002 or 2003 the company was placed into receivership and in 2006 was purchased by Flying Dog Brewery and renamed Wild Goose Brewery. At some point the brewery stopped being known as Wild Goose Brewery and just became Flying Dog Brewery.

The brewery was generally considered to be state of the art. The plant cost somewhere between $4.4 million and $8 million to build, with $4.5 million of the cost being paid for with economic development bonds, and in 2002 it had a capacity of 80,000 barrels annually. The company though was never able to sell more than 11,000 barrels of its brand Blue Ridge in any given year. When the company's stock was initially issued in 1995 it sold for over $6 a share and was traded on NASDAQ, but by 2002 it sold for less than 10 cents.

Frederick Brewing Company is considered to exemplify the 1990s microbeer bubble. Modern Brewery Age calls Frederick Brewing Company "the exemplar of heedless expansion of the micro segment". According to K. Timothy Swanson, there was a microbrew craze in the 1990s that ended with consumers being confused by the vast number of beers available. When the microbrewing industry declined, Frederick Brewing Company went with it.

== History ==
=== Early growth ===
Frederick Brewing Company was founded in either 1992 or 1993 by Marjorie McGinnis, Kevin Brannon, and Steve Nordahl.

In 1995 the founders raised money through an initial public offering for the company. They used the money to purchase land with enough space to build a 100,000 barrel brewery and expensive modern brewing equipment. The company created the Blue Ridge brand of beer which did well at first, but eventually began "gathering dust on store shelves throughout the Mid-Atlantic". To raise sales the company purchased Wild Goose Brewing Co. and Brimstone Brewing Co. and also created Hempen Ale. The Hempen Ale brand was popular for a short time. In 1995 it was ranked the fourth fastest growing brewery by Beverage World.

They moved into the new brewery in March 1997 and it had its grand opening on 12 February 1997. They gave tours of the facility throughout the entire lifetime of the company.

In either March 1997 they purchased Wild Goose Brewery Inc. and purchased Brimstone Brewing Co. These purchases made Frederick Brewing Company the largest craft brewery in the Mid-Atlantic Region. In January 1998 the production of Wild Goose products was moved from the Cambridge to the Frederick brewery.

=== Early financial issues ===
Yearly Losses
Year	Losses
1996	$2.6 million
1997	$8 million
1998	$4.3 million
1999	$4.6 million

Early on in its life Frederick Brewing Company faced financial difficulties. In January 1997 the brewery was in default on a $976,000 bank loan (though by June this was resolved). In 1996 the company had $1.9 million in sales, but lost $2.6 million overall. Of those losses $1.5 million was in the fourth quarter. Overall in 1997 they lost $8 million and had $3.3 million in sales.

In order to cut costs in 1998 Frederick Brewing Company eliminated 6 management positions and reduced the salaries of their executives.

In February 1998 the stock prices of Frederick Brewing Company went below NASDAQ's required minimum price for listed stocks. NASDAQ threatened to delist the stock unless it went above $1 for 10 days by December 14, 1998. At the close of December 16, 1998 the stock traded on NASDAQ for 37.5 cents a share. At the end of 1998 the company reported a $4.3 million loss.

In 1998 it had its stock pulled from NASDAQ because it no longer met stock price requirements. The shareholders of the company met on 25 February 1999 to discuss whether or not to keep the stock listed on NASDAQ. They decided to appeal the delisting notice, but also planned to do a reverse stock split to increase the share price. The CEO of Frederick Brewing Company said that he did not want the stock traded over the counter.

Sometime around April 1999 the shareholders transacted the 10-1 reverse stock split. In 1999 a three part plan was formed to save the company, which involved purchasing a brand of malt liquor. They also planned to refinance about $1.2 million in debt; in the meantime they took out a $500,000 bridge loan. In order to cut costs and prevent further losses, that year they also removed another layer of management. In mid-April 1999 the co-founder and brewmaster Steve Nordahl left the company. At the end of 1999 the company reported a $4.6 million loss with $1.2 million of that being lost in the fourth quarter. To this point the company had never turned a profit.

=== Ownership by Snyder International Brewing Group ===
Staff reductions and reductions of executive pay were not enough solve the company's financial problems.

On August 26, 1999 it was announced that Snyder International Brewing Group (SIBG) had taken over Frederick Brewing Company for a price of $2.4 million. SIBG paid $2 million to purchase 51% of Frederick Brewing Company's common stock and $422,000 to purchase Blue II, which owned the land Frederick Brewing Company was located on. The founders Kevin Brannon and Marjorie McGinnis gave up their positions of president and CEO and became vice presidents of the company until their departure, which was scheduled for the end of September. C. David Snyder became chairman and CEO of Frederick Brewing Company. The deal had been in talks since June of the previous year. SIBG had attempted to purchase the company once before, but the deal had fallen through. As part of the agreement, McGinnis would get two free cases of beer a month for the rest of her life.

No lay-offs were expected as a result of the company sale. At this time SIBG also hired a chief financial officer.

Frederick Brewing Company was the third purchase that SIBG made in the year prior. The company saw Frederick Brewing Company as a modern, but underutilised brewery and because of their "limited understanding of the reputations of this company" they had no problems with the brewery's history. Snyder got into the beer business when he purchased a brewery that was going out of business in order to save his favourite brand of beer. At the time of purchase Frederick Brewing Company had never turned a profit. The company cut jobs and removed several executives in an effort to save money.

In 2000 Frederick Brewing Company was still having financial problems, and in an interview its general manager, who had previously worked for SIBG, said that getting the company's finances together will take some time.

Frederick Brewing Company received a merger proposal from SIBG on January 8, 2001. The merge proposal, if accepted, would result in SIBG owning 95% of Frederick Brewing Company's stocks. Because David Snyder was chairman and CEO of both SIBG and Frederick Brewing Company, a special committee was created in order to evaluate the merger proposal. Sometime in 2001 SIBG took over the company.

In 2001 Frederick Brewing Company was unable to pay the increased water and sewage fees that Frederick County was charging. In January of either 2002 or 2003 it was placed in receivership (along with Blue II) in Ohio. The Ohio courts appointed a receiver to manage the company. At the time Frederick Brewing Company owed more than $1 million in back-taxes. That year Frederick County attempted to include Frederick Brewing Company in the county's annual tax sale, this did not go through with the county stating that "it fell through the cracks."

In May 2003 Snyder International moved all of its operations to Frederick and closed their Ohio plant. As of 2004 the plant employed about a dozen people and was producing between 5,000 and 7,000 barrels of beer a month.

In May 2004 Frederick Brewing Company owed Frederick County $610,392.63 in back-taxes for water and $86,217.28 in back-taxes for sewer fees and property taxes. That year there was also an attempt to include the company in Frederick County's annual tax sale, but this was stipulated the back-taxes not getting paid. On May 12, 2004 the investment company Ruppert Companies was scheduled to purchase the Frederick Brewing Company building so that Frederick Brewing Company could pay off its taxes. Meissner, the vice president of Ruppert, described the time period as a "very challenging financial period" and said that the company had "displayed questionable judgement in the past, especially while being overseen by its outside receiver", but that he was "confident in the company's ownership". He also stressed that Ruppert would not be operating the brewing company, just that they would own the building. The purchase agreement stipulated that Frederick Brewing Company pay back the $610,392.63 it owed in back-taxes.

In 2004 Frederick Brewing Company also owed $2.1 million to BB&T in addition to the approximately $1 million it owed Frederick County. The court-appointed receiver told SIBG they should sell the company to pay off a debt of $3.1 million. The sale was made to settle the $3.1 million in debts. Mark Dottore, the man appointed by the Court of Common Pleas in Cuyahoga County, Ohio, said that the sale was an attempt to keep the business alive. He also said that the brewery was "state-of-the-art". As of January 2004 there were plans to have it sold by the end of January or the beginning of February. The equipment would be sold to the buyer and the building would be leased to them. The buyer would continue to make beer.

=== Sale to Flying Dog ===
On July 27, 2006 Flying Dog, which was founded as a brew pub in Aspen, purchased Frederick Brewing Company for $1.6 million. Frederick Brewing Company was renamed Wild Goose Brewery and was made the "East Coast hub" for Flying Dog. Flying Dog planned to use the brewery to double their production to 35,000 barrels a year. As of 2006 the brewery employed 25 people and had a capacity to produce 120,000 barrels annually. In 2007 Flying Dog moved all of their operations to Frederick. In 2008 they moved all of their production to Frederick as the brewery in Frederick was able to produce beer twice as fast as their facilities in Denver were able to.

In November 2010, because of high demand for Flying Dog beer, Frederick Brewing Company no longer had the capacity to produce Wild Goose beer. By December 2010 Logan Shaw had agreed to purchase the Wild Goose brand of beer and the brand changed ownership in February 2011.

== Notable brands ==
Frederick Brewing Company produced a number of well known brands over the years. The first brand the company made was called Blue Ridge. In 1998 they made Blue Ridge, Hempen, Wild Goose and Brimstone. That same year they partnered with C&L Brewing Co. to make a beer marketed towards high income African Americans. In 2000 at the World Beer Cup the two beers under the Blue Ridge brand won gold medals. The same year a beer under the Blue Ridge brand, a beer under the Brimstone brand, and a beer under the Wild Goose brand were rated "exceptional" by the Beverage Testing Institute. In 2001, Frederick Brewing Company produced a total of 26 styles of beer, with 10 of them being styles contracted to them by other brewing companies and had beers sold in 21 states. In 2001 Blue Ridge represented about 10-15% of all sales the company made. In 2004, Frederick Brewing Company made Wild Goose, Blue Ridge, Crooked River, Little Kings and Hudepohl beer and ale.

=== Hempen Ale ===
In 1997 Frederick Brewing Company made beer flavoured with hemp seeds which they called Hempen Ale. The ale received international attention. The Baltimore Sun quotes the Hemp Association as saying that Frederick Brewing Company was the only brewery doing this at the time. The National also says that Frederick Brewing Company was the first brewery in the United States to make beer with hemp seeds. By June 1997 Frederick Brewing Company had back-orders of 10,000 cases for their Hempen Ale. The ale also caught the attention of the Bureau of Alcohol, Tobacco, Firearms and Explosives, the Food and Drug Administration, and the Drug Enforcement Administration who got involved because it is illegal to grow hemp in the United States. Hemp seeds, imported from China, were a key ingredient in Hempen Ale making up 10% to 30% of the beer by weight. Federal regulators were also concerned about the label on the bottles, which included Japanese maple leaves, which resemble cannabis leaves. Frederick Brewing Company was able to get approval of their label, but they spent nearly $20,000 in legal fees to do so.

In 1998 with the help of Imports Brands of Canada they were also able to get Hempen Ale sold in Canada. According to U.S. News & World Report, at some point in the late 90s the beer was served on Air Force One.

== See also ==
- Flying Dog Brewery
