= William J. Willis =

American experimental particle physicist (1932-2012)

William J. Willis (15 September 1932, Fort Smith, Arkansas – 1 November 2012, Dobbs Ferry, New York) was an American experimental particle physicist.

== Biography ==
William Willis studied physics at Yale University, where he received his bachelor's degree in 1954 and his PhD in 1958 with advisor Earle Fowler and dissertation related to the development of hydrogen bubble chambers in Ralph P. Shutt's research group. Willis was a postdoc at Brookhaven National Laboratory (BNL), where he observed weak decays of kaons and hyperons in bubble chambers. In 1961/62 he was at CERN, where he was involved in experiments on weak decays of hyperons, which confirmed the Cabibbo theory of weak interaction. In 1964 Willis joined the faculty of Yale University. From 1973 to 1991, he was at CERN, where he undertook experiments at the ISR, developing novel detector concepts. He was essential for the development of the ISR's Axial Field Spectrometer, which detected the first high-pt jet events in hadronic collisions. The approach used in the Axial Field Spectrometer became standard for hadron colliders.

Subsequently he turned his interest to nuclear matter under extreme conditions of temperature and density: he convinced the CERN management to adapt the SPS to the acceleration of heavy ions, including lead ions, thus opening a new field, which flourished at RHIC and now also at the LHC.

In 1991 Willis became the Eugene Higgins Professor of Physics at Columbia University. Following the failure to fund the Superconducting Super Collider, he sought ways to involve US physicists in CERN's LHC plans, and was a member of the first US delegation to CERN in 1993. In the 2000s he was (until 2005) Project Manager in the US Department of ATLAS Collaboration at CERN's LHC.

From 1994 to 2010 he was assistant director of the BNL. Among other things, he supported the construction of the RHIC, which went into operation in 2000, and led the technical committee for the RHIC in the 1980s. More recently, he contributed his expertise in liquid argon detectors to the planning of neutrino experiments at Fermilab's (MicroBooNE experiment).

He was a Fellow of the American Physical Society and in 2003 received the Panofsky Prize for "his leading role in the development and exploitation of innovative techniques now widely adopted in particle physics, including liquid argon calorimetry, electron identification by detection of transition radiation, and hyperon beams." In 1993 he was elected a member of the American Academy of Arts and Sciences.

Willis was married and had one daughter and four sons.
