= Capitol Peak =

Peak name

Capitol Peak may refer to:

Name	County, State	Coordinates	USGS 7.5' map
Capitol Peak	Pitkin, CO	39°09′01″N 107°04′59″W	Capitol Peak
U.S. Geological Survey Geographic Names Information System: Capitol Peak	Humboldt, NV	41°50′17″N 117°18′35″W	Capitol Peak
U.S. Geological Survey Geographic Names Information System: Capitol Peak	Socorro, NM	33°24′25″N 106°25′28″W	Capitol Peak
U.S. Geological Survey Geographic Names Information System: Capitol Peak	Randall, TX	34°57′12″N 101°40′35″W	Fortress Cliff
Capitol Peak	Thurston, WA	46°58′22″N 123°08′11″W	Capitol Peak
U.S. Geological Survey Geographic Names Information System: Capitol Peak	Mason, WA	47°29′32″N 123°29′36″W	Mount Tebo
