= David George Hitlin =

- Born: April 15, 1942 (age 84)
- Education: Columbia University (BA, PhD)
- Awards: Panofsky Prize (2016)
- Scientific career
- Fields: Particle physics
- Workplaces: California Institute of Technology

David George Hitlin (born 15 April 1942) is a professor at the California Institute of Technology, specializing in experimental particle physics.

He was educated at Columbia University, where he received his B.A. in 1963, and Ph.D. in 1968.

In 1986 he was elected a Fellow of the American Physical Society for contributions to the study of weak decays of K mesons, particularly measurements of CP violating parameters and form factors, and for measurements of hadronic states produced in the decay of the psi meson and detailed studies of the weak decays of charmed particles". In 2016 he was awarded their Panofsky Prize "for leadership in the BABAR and Belle experiments, which established the violation of CP symmetry in B meson decay, and furthered our understanding of quark mixing and quantum chromodynamics." His co-awardees were Drs. Jonathan Dorfan, Fumihiko Takasaki, and Stephen L. Olsen.
