= Flying Dog Brewery =

Craft brewery in Frederick, Maryland

Coordinates: 39°21′46″N 77°25′35″W

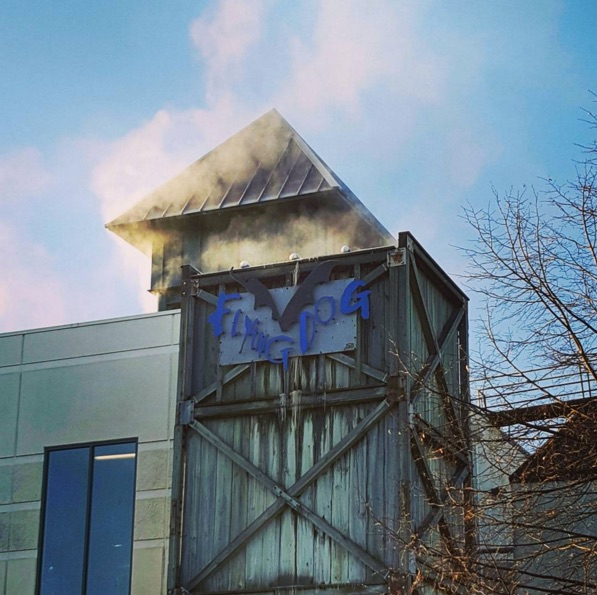
- Flying Dog Brewery in Frederick
- Industry: Alcoholic beverage
- Founded: 1990; 36 years ago
- Founders: George Stranahan
- Headquarters: Frederick, Maryland, U.S.
- Products: Beer, RTDs, hard cider, FMBs
- Production output: 100,000 US beer barrels (120,000 hl)
- Owner: F.X. Matt Brewing Company
- Website: flyingdog.com

Flying Dog Brewery was a craft brewery located in Frederick, Maryland, United States. It was founded in 1990 by George Stranahan and was the largest brewery in Maryland. In 2017, it was the 28th largest craft brewery in the United States.

In May 2023, the company announced that it would be acquired by the F.X. Matt Brewing Company and would begin relocating most of its production processes to New York.

== History ==
A physicist with degrees from the California Institute of Technology and the Carnegie Institute of Technology who had previously co-founded the Aspen Center for Physics in 1962, Stranahan left an associate professorship at Michigan State University in 1972 to assume ownership of the Flying Dog Ranch in Woody Creek, Colorado. Eight years later, he made his first foray into the restaurant business, opening the Woody Creek Tavern nearby. It became notable for its association with the journalist and Woody Creek resident, Hunter S. Thompson, who frequented the establishment on a near-nightly basis for late lunches when in town. Thompson and Stranahan, who had previously been Thompson's landlord, had enjoyed a close friendship since the late 1960s.

In 1990, Stranahan opened the Flying Dog Brewpub in Aspen. It was the first brewery to open there in over 100 years and was one of the first brewpubs in the Rocky Mountain region.

Demand for Flying Dog beers quickly grew beyond the brewpub's capacity. In 1994, the company opened a 30-barrel brewery (Broadway Brewing Company) in Denver, Colorado, which was a joint venture with the brewpub Wynkoop Brewing Company.

In 2000, Flying Dog purchased Wynkoop's interest in the brewery and opened a second location in Denver at 2401 Blake Street.

Wanting to expand again in 2006, Flying Dog purchased Frederick Brewing Company in Frederick, Maryland, in May and began producing beer in both Maryland and Colorado. Flying Dog also acquired the Wild Goose brand and produced those beers until December 2010, when the brand was sold to Logan Shaw Brewing Company.

In December 2007, Flying Dog announced that it was closing the Denver brewery and would produce beer solely in its Frederick facility. At that time, the Denver brewery was in need of at least $1 million in infrastructure improvements. Flying Dog was also experiencing its strongest growth to date and could surpass Denver production levels by concentrating operations in Maryland.

Flying Dog Brewery had the capacity to brew 100,000 barrels of beer per year in 2015 and it is currently upgrading the facility to produce 700,000 barrels per year.

In October 2017, the expansion project was put on hold with the owner citing legislative issues.

== Name ==
In 1983, Stranahan, Richard McIntyre and ten close friends decided to climb the K2 mountain in the Himalayas, the second highest peak in the world. The story goes that they had with them a suitcase of contraband, a donkey and a Sherpa. About halfway through the trip, the contraband was depleted and the Sherpa had suffered a broken leg. Eventually, the entire crew returned unharmed. After the trek, the group settled in the Flashman Hotel in Rawalpindi, Pakistan, to have a drink. Hanging on a wall of the hotel was a painting of a flying dog made by a local woman, Fatima Jinnah. The painting depicts a classical Chinese Fawn Pug with wings soaring across the verdant foothills of the Himalayas. Jinnah's mythical incarnation of the pug, a recognizable symbol of the Chinese aristocracy in the Song dynasty among the people of the Tibetan plateau, is thought to evoke nostalgia for the prosperity and trade that flourished in central Asia in the centuries before the Opium Wars and semi-colonialism of China in the mid-20th century. Stranahan and his crew were inspired by the picture and the idea of the flying dog, which eventually took root in his creation of the company.

== Hunter S. Thompson ==
The author Hunter S. Thompson lived a few blocks from Stranahan's Flying Dog Ranch in Colorado. They became good friends over common interests in drinking and firearms. In 1990, Thompson introduced Stranahan to Ralph Steadman, who went on to create original artwork for Flying Dog's beer labels in 1995. His first label artwork was for the Road Dog Porter, a beer inspired and blessed by Thompson who wrote a short essay about it titled "Ale According to Hunter". In 2005, the brewery created a new beer in Thompson's honor, Gonzo Imperial Porter. Initially in limited-release in 750mL bottles, it is now one of the regular offerings of the brewery.

== Labels and artwork ==
Label of Flying Dog's "Flying Dog Classic Pale Ale"

Flying Dog Brewery is noted for using the unusual art of Ralph Steadman, known as the illustrator of Thompson's works, on its labels. His Flying Dog artwork typically consists of strange, twisted imaginations of dogs with wings, with a vast array of bright and vibrant colors.

In October 2013, in honor of the relationship between Steadman and Thompson, Flying Dog Brewery created an exhibition titled "The Gonzo Collection", featuring reinterpretations and responses to Steadman's work by several notable international artists, including Bob Dob, Nathan Spoor, Justin Bua, Michael Owen, Nanami Cowdry and Tatiana Suarez. Regarding the month-long exhibit, Flying Dog's CEO said, "Ralph is one of the true artists in the world. He is also a principled, loving, generous human being. To pay tribute to him by furthering his impact in the art world is only appropriate."

== Music ==
Since moving to Frederick, Maryland, Flying Dog Brewery had supported Frederick's music and musicians. After hosting a yearly summer concert series, in 2015 the brewery released "Frederick - Volume One", a compilation album of new unreleased music from 15 Frederick-based artists and bands, including the indie-rock bands Big Hoax and Silent Old Mtns. The album was released at the first annual Frederick Fall Fest, a mid-sized music festival presented by Flying Dog.

Flying Dog regularly hosts musicians on Friday nights in its bar, which has a small stage for live music.

== Freedom of speech lawsuit ==
In 2009, the Michigan Liquor Control Commission denied Flying Dog Brewery the licensing right to sell its 20th anniversary beer, "Raging Bitch" in Michigan, with claims that the label is "detrimental to public health, safety and welfare". In 2011, with help from the Center for the Defense of Free Enterprise, Flying Dog filed suit against the 2009 decision, citing freedom of speech. Several months later, the MLCC reversed its original decision, allowing "Raging Bitch" to be sold in the state of Michigan.

Jim Caruso later spoke at events by Students for Liberty and Young Americans for Liberty about the legal battle, and was described as "an ardent believer in free expression".
