= Wesley Smith (academic) =

Particle physicist

Wesley H. Smith is the Bjorn Wiik Professor of Physics at the University of Wisconsin–Madison where he has taught since 1988. Before that he taught at Columbia University.

Along with fellow physics professor Sau Lan Wu and math professor Terry Millar, he was “central to Wisconsin’s contribution to development of the Large Hadron Collider.”

== Education ==
- Harvard University Physics A.B/A.M. 1976
- University of California, Berkeley Physics Ph.D. 1981
- Columbia University High Energy Physics Post Doc 1981-1982

== Awards and honors ==
- 2020 W.K.H. Panofsky Prize in Experimental Particle Physics Recipient
