= Charles Y. Prescott =

American physicist (born 1938)

Charles Young Prescott (born 14 December 1938 in Ponca City, Oklahoma) is an American particle physicist.

Prescott received in 1961 from Rice University his bachelor's degree and in 1966 from Caltech his Ph.D. under Robert Lee Walker (1919–2005) with thesis Eta meson photoproduction in the region of the third nucleon resonance. From 1966 to 1970 he was a research scientist at Caltech's Synchrotron Laboratory. In 1970/71 he was an assistant professor at the University of California, Santa Cruz. At the Stanford Linear Accelerator (SLAC), he was in 1971–1980 a staff member, in 1980–1984 an associate professor, and in 1984–2006 a full professor, retiring as professor emeritus in 2006. At SLAC he was also associate director of the research division in 1986–1991.

In the 1970s Prescott investigated deep inelastic scattering of polarized electrons and was part of the team that observed parity violation. These experiments confirmed the theory of the electroweak interactions in the Standard Model of particle physics. He also did research using polarized electron beams to examine the spin structure of nucleons.

In 1980 Prescott proposed adding polarized beams to the SLC (Stanford Linear Collider) project. This was the first time polarization was discussed as part of the program of Z physics at e^{+}e^{–} colliders. Polarized beams became an important part of the SLC program from 1992 to 1998. In 1982 he helped in starting the SLD project and participated in the project until it ended in 1998. From 1995 to 2000 he served as the chairperson of the International Spin Physics Symposia. He was head of a SLAC research group (Group A) from 1991 until his retirement in 2006.

In the 2000s he was part of the science team (including Martin Breidenbach) for SLAC's EXO (Enriched Xenon Observatory) experiment to search for neutrino-less double beta decay. Prescott also participated in studies for the design and implementation of future linear accelerators.

In 1988 he received the Panofsky Prize. In 1997 he was elected a Fellow of the American Physical Society. In 2001 he was elected a member of the National Academy of Sciences.

== Selected publications ==
- Prescott: Summary and outlook on the future, SLAC – PUB – 4435, September 1987, Invited talk presented at the Seventh International Conference on Physics in Collision, Tsukuba, Japan, August 25–27, 1987]
- Prescott: An Overview of Spin Physics, 1991
- Prescott: Weak electromagnetic interference in electron deuteron scattering. In: Lillian Hoddeson, Laurie Brown, Michael Riordan, Max Dresden (eds.): The rise of the standard model. Cambridge University Press, 1997.
