= Martin Breidenbach =

American physicist (born 1943)

- Education: Massachusetts Institute of Technology (B.Sc. 1965, Ph.D. 1970)
- Awards: Fellow of the American Physical Society, 1985
- Scientific career
- Fields: Particle physics
- Workplaces: Stanford University

Martin Breidenbach (born 1943) is an American professor of particle physics and astrophysics, emeritus, at Stanford University. His research interests have included e+e- colliding beam physics, detector optimization, and electromagnetic calorimeters.

== Early life and education ==
The son of Leo and Sylvia (née Rosen) Breidenbach, Martin Breidenbach was born in New York in 1943. After his birth, the family moved to Hillsdale, New Jersey.

He earned a bachelor's degree in 1965 and a doctorate in 1970, both at the Massachusetts Institute of Technology. His dissertation, Inelastic Electron-Proton Scattering at High Momentum Transfer, was advised by Jerome Friedman and Henry Kendall, based on the first deeply inelastic electron-proton scattering experiment at SLAC.

== Career ==
From 1971 to 1972, he worked at CERN in the Split Field Magnet Group at ISR. In 1972, he returned to SLAC, joining the SLAC-LBL Magnetic Detector effort at SPEAR that in 1974 discovered the J/ψ and ψ'. At SLAC he also became involved in Burton Richter's experiments on the SPEAR storage ring, and new charmonium states.

Starting in 1980 Breidenbach was involved in the construction of the Stanford Linear Collider (SLC) control system and design of the SLD detector. In 1984 he became co-spokesman for the SLD with Charles Baltay, making precise determinations of the parameters of the electroweak interaction.

In 1989 he became a professor at SLAC.

He was also involved in the Next Linear Collider project of SLAC, an effort replaced by participation in the International Linear Collider.

== Awards, honors ==
- 1985 APS Fellow, Citation: For his outstanding contributions to detector development which were crucial to the discoveries of the ψ and ψ´.
- 2000 Panofsky Prize, Citation: For his many contributions to e+e- physics, especially with the SLD detector at the Stanford Linear Collider. His deep involvement in all aspects of the project led to important advances both in the measurement of electroweak parameters and in accelerator technology.
