= Panofsky Prize =

Award recognizing outstanding achievements in experimental particle physics

The Panofsky Prize in Experimental Particle Physics is an annual prize of the American Physical Society. It is given to recognize and encourage outstanding achievements in experimental particle physics, and is open to scientists of any nation. It was established in 1985 by friends of Wolfgang K. H. Panofsky and by the Division of Particles and Fields of the American Physical Society. Panofsky was a physics professor at Stanford University and the first director of the Stanford Linear Accelerator Center (SLAC). Several of the prize winners have subsequently won the Nobel Prize in Physics. As of 2021, the prize included a $10,000 award.

== Recipients ==
The names, citations, and short biographies for Panofsky Prize winners are posted by the American Physical Society.

- 2026: Joel Butler
- 2025: Eckhard E. Elsen, Robert Klanner
- 2024: Leslie J. Rosenberg, David B. Tanner
- 2023: B. Lee Roberts, William M. Morse
- 2022: Byron G. Lundberg, Kimio Niwa, Regina Abby Rameika, Vittorio Paolone
- 2021: Edward Kearns, Henry W. Sobel
- 2020: Wesley Smith
- 2019: Sheldon Leslie Stone
- 2018: Lawrence Sulak
- 2017: Tejinder Virdee, Michel Della Negra, Peter Jenni
- 2016: David Hitlin, Fumihiko Takasaki, Jonathan Dorfan, Stephen L. Olsen
- 2015: Stanley Wojcicki
- 2014: Kam-Biu Luk, Wang Yifang
- 2013: Blas Cabrera Navarro, Bernard Sadoulet
- 2012: William B. Atwood
- 2011: Doug Bryman, Laurence Littenberg, A. J. Stewart Smith
- 2010: Eugene Beier
- 2009: Aldo Menzione, Luciano Ristori
- 2008: George Cassiday, Pierre Sokolsky
- 2007: Bruce Winstein, Heinrich Wahl, Italo Mannelli
- 2006: John Jaros, Nigel Lockyer, William T. Ford
- 2005: Piermaria J. Oddone
- 2004: Arie Bodek
- 2003: William J. Willis
- 2002: Masatoshi Koshiba, Takaaki Kajita, Yoji Totsuka
- 2001: Paul Grannis
- 2000: Martin Breidenbach
- 1999: Edward H. Thorndike
- 1998: David Robert Nygren
- 1997: Henning Schröder, Yury Mikhailovich Zaitsev
- 1996: Gail G. Hanson, Roy Frederick Schwitters
- 1995: Frank J. Sciulli
- 1994: Thomas J. Devlin, Lee G. Pondrom
- 1993: Robert B. Palmer, Nicholas P. Samios, Ralph P. Shutt
- 1992: Raymond Davis, Jr. and Frederick Reines
- 1991: Gerson Goldhaber and Francois Pierre
- 1990: Michael S. Witherell
- 1989: Henry W. Kendall, Richard E. Taylor, Jerome I. Friedman
- 1988: Charles Y. Prescott

== See also ==
- List of physics awards
