= George Stranahan =

American physicist and entrepreneur (1931–2021)

George Secor Stranahan (November 5, 1931, in Toledo – May 20, 2021, in Denver) was an American physicist and entrepreneur, best remembered for founding the Flying Dog Brewery, Stranahan's Colorado Whiskey, and the Aspen Center for Physics. His family owned the Champion Spark Plug Company, and his inheritance was used to found these ventures. He founded the Woody Creek Tavern, which was the favorite watering hole of Hunter S. Thompson, who was also Stranahan's best friend. He founded and was principal of the Aspen Community School.
