= Carol Prescott =

American psychologist

- Born: Carol Arlene Prescott
- Education: Johns Hopkins University; University of Virginia
- Known for: Behavior genetics Psychiatric genetics
- Awards: Theodore Reich Young Investigator Award from the International Society of Psychiatric Genetics (2004); Fulker Award from the Behavior Genetics Association (2006)
- Scientific career
- Fields: Gerontology; Psychology
- Institutions: Virginia Commonwealth University; University of Southern California
- Thesis: Clinical, psychometric, and biometric assessment of schizophrenia: A psychiatric twin study (1991)
- Doctoral advisor: Irving Gottesman

Carol Arlene Prescott is a professor in the Department of Psychology at the University of Southern California (USC), where she also holds a joint appointment in the Davis School of Gerontology. Before joining the faculty of USC in 2005, she was an assistant, and later associate, professor in the Department of Psychiatry at Virginia Commonwealth University. Her research focuses on the genetic and environmental contributions to variation in cognition, as well as on identifying causes of substance use disorders.
