= Terry Millar =

American mathematician (1948–2019)

Terrence Staples (Terry) Millar (September 18, 1948 – March 9, 2019) was professor emeritus of mathematics and former associate dean for physical sciences in the Graduate School and assistant to the provost at the University of Wisconsin–Madison. He joined the math faculty in 1976 after serving two years in the Marines and obtaining a Ph.D. from Cornell University. Millar retired in 2015 and was considered to be one of the world's foremost researchers in computable model theory.

== Biography ==
He earned a bachelor’s degree in mathematics from Cornell University in 1970 and his Ph.D. in Mathematics from Cornell University in 1975.

Millar died March 9, 2019, at the age of 70 due to pancreatic cancer.

== Career ==
Along with physics professors Sau Lan Wu and Wesley Smith (academic), he “was central to Wisconsin’s contribution to development of the Large Hadron Collider.” Working alongside Francis Halzen, he was “integral in launching the IceCube South Pole Neutrino Observatory.”
