= John Robert Victor Prescott =

Australian academic (1931–2018)

John Robert Victor Prescott FASSA (12 May 1931 – 17 August 2018), known as Victor Prescott, was a British and Australian academic, writer, and professor emeritus at the University of Melbourne. A political geographer, most of Prescott's work focused on international boundary issues, particularly maritime boundaries. He was also noted for commenting on Australian elections until 1987.

== Education ==
Prescott earned his BSc (1952). Dip. Ed. and MA degrees at the University of Durham in the United Kingdom. After Prescott was awarded the Marshall Scholarship, University of London awarded his doctorate degree.

== Career ==
Prescott started his career as a schoolteacher in Durham after undergraduate study, and was then appointed lecturer in the Department of Geography, University of Ibadan, Nigeria in 1956. He gained a Masters and his PhD (on Nigerian border issues) while in post.

He was appointed lecturer in geography at the University of Melbourne in 1961. He was made Professor in 1986 at the age of 55, and retired in 1996.

He was a commentator on political matters and geography for Australian ABC radio, also commenting on and predicting Australian election outcomes, until 1987.

== Scholarly contributions ==
Prescott's interests remained in political geography, always with a focus on borders and frontiers, and their material and political characteristics. Studies included Australian Aboriginal conceptions of territory and frontiers, border disputes in South East Asia and the South China Sea, and the effects of the colonial period on African borders. van Houtum summarized Prescott and Julian Minghi's two major contributions to border geography as showing "Where is the border located, how did it came about, evolve, change over time, become the topic of (military) disputes and what are the political consequences of its (changes in) location." Prescott's last book explored the legal and geographical problems of borders, which he co-authored with the renowned human rights lawyer and academic Gillian Triggs.

Prescott was particularly active in examining the problems generated by maritime boundaries and borders, and resolution of disputes through negotiation and the United Nations Convention on the Law of the Sea. He wrote in his 1985 book with Schofield: "The marked increase in maritime space coming under the jurisdiction of coastal states in the post-war period, coupled with similarly significant changes in the diversity and intensity of offshore activities, radically transformed the nature of maritime boundary negotiations, enhancing both their complexity and importance. Clearly, the extension of coastal states' sovereignty seawards has generated the potential for many new maritime boundaries and a host of overlapping jurisdictional claims and offshore boundary disputes."

== Selected works ==
Prescott published widely on boundary issues and political geography. A full list of his works was compiled by his wife Dorothy, available here. Much of it is in/with conventional academic journals and publishers, and is therefore inaccessible online. In addition, his early work incorporated quotes in French and German, inaccessible to many. These books have, however, been re-released in the mid-2010s. Major works were:

- Prescott, J.R.V. 1965. The Geography of Frontiers and Boundaries. London: Hutchinson. Reprinted by Routledge, 2015.
- Prescott, J.R.V. 1968. The geography of state policies. London: Hutchinson University Library. Reprinted 1986 and Routledge, 2015.
- Prescott, J.R.V. 1971. The evolution of Nigeria's international and regional boundaries: 1861-1971. Vancouver: Tantalus Research.
- Prescott, J.R.V. 1972. Political Geography. London: Methuen Young Books. ISBN 0416070000
- Prescott, J.R.V. and W.G. East. 1975 .Our Fragmented World: an Introduction to Political Geography. London: Macmillan student editions.
- Prescott, J.R.V. 1975. Einführung in die politische Geographie. Munchen: Beck.
- Prescott, J.R.V. 1975. The political geography of the oceans. Newton Abbot: David & Charles.
- Prescott, J.R.V. 1975. Map of mainland Asia by treaty. Melbourne: Melbourne University Press.
- Prescott J.R.V., H.J. Collier and D.F. Prescott. 1977. The frontiers of Asia and Southeast Asia. Melbourne: Melbourne University Press.
- Prescott, J.R.V. 1978. Frontiers and Boundaries. London: Croom Helm.
- Prescott J.R.V. (ed.). 1979. Australia’s continental shelf. Melbourne: Nelson.
- Lovering, J.F. and J.R.V. Prescott. 1979. Last of Lands... Antarctica. Melbourne: Melbourne University Press.
- Prescott J.R.V. and C. Schofield. 1985 The Maritime Political Boundaries of the World. Boston: Martinus Nijhoff. 2nd ed. 2005, in Chinese 2014.
- Prescott, J.R.V. 1985. Australia’s maritime boundaries. Canberra: Australian National University, Dept. of International Relations.
- Davis, S.L. and J.R.V. Prescott. 1992. Aboriginal Frontiers and Boundaries in Australia. Melbourne: Melbourne University Press.
- Prescott, J.R.V. 1998. The Gulf of Thailand: Maritime limits to conflict and cooperation. Kuala Lumpur: Maritime Institute of Malaysia.
- Prescott, J.R.V. 1999. Limits of National Claims in the South China Sea. London: ASEAN Academic Press.
- Prescott J.R.V. and G. Triggs. 2008. International Frontiers and Boundaries: Law, Politics and Geography. Boston: Martinus Nijhoff.

== Honors ==
- Academy of the Social Sciences in Australia, Fellow, 1979.
