= Boris Shklovskii =

Russian physicist (born 1944)

Boris Ionovich Shklovskii (born 1944) is a Russian theoretical physicist, at the William I Fine Theoretical Physics Institute, University of Minnesota, specializing in condensed matter. Shklovskii earned his A.B. degree in Physics, in 1966 and a Ph.D. in condensed matter theory, in 1968 from Leningrad University.

Shklovskii is known for the Efros–Shklovskii variable-range hopping conductivity, a model for the temperature dependence of the electrical conductivity in the variable-range hopping regime. He has also made important contributions to the theory of the Quantum Hall effect (explaining the structure of conducting edge channels and predicting the formation of Quantum Hall stripe and bubble phases) and to the theory of macromolecules (developing the theory of electrostatic charge inversion).

== Honors and awards ==
Shklovskii was awarded the Landau Prize of Academy of Sciences of USSR in 1986, the A.S. Fine Chair in Theoretical Physics in 1990, and was elected a fellow of the American Physical Society in 1997.

In 2018, he received the 2019 Oliver E. Buckley Condensed Matter Physics Prize for "pioneering research in the physics of disordered materials and hopping conductivity" together with Alexei L. Efros and Elihu Abrahams.

In 2023 he was elected to the National Academy of Sciences.
