= Peter S. Prescott =

American author and literary critic

Peter Sherwin Prescott (July 15, 1935 - April 23, 2004) was an American author and book critic. He was the senior book reviewer at Newsweek for more than two decades.

In January 1970, Prescott published A World of Our Own: Notes on Life and Learning in a Boys' Preparatory School, which described his alma mater, The Choate School, now Choate Rosemary Hall. He graduated magna cum laude from Harvard University and completed graduate work at the Sorbonne.

In the April 10, 1978 issue of Newsweek, he accused John Gardner of plagiarism, citing a previously published article by Sumner J. Ferris.

In 1981 he published The Child Savers, which won the Robert F. Kennedy Center for Justice and Human Rights 1982 Book award given annually to a novelist who "most faithfully and forcefully reflects Robert Kennedy's purposes - his concern for the poor and the powerless, his struggle for honest and even-handed justice, his conviction that a decent society must assure all young people a fair chance, and his faith that a free democracy can act to remedy disparities of power and opportunity."

Prescott served on the 1981, 1983, 1987 and 1989 juries for the Pulitzer Prize for Fiction at the behest of administrator Robert Christopher, a former Newsweek colleague.

Prescott is referred to in Stephen King's 1987 novel Misery as someone who would probably blast the protagonist, Paul Sheldon's, next novel "in his finest genteel disparaging manner."

In the mid-1990s, Prescott was collecting interviews for a book about Alfred and Blanche Knopf.

He died in 2004.
