= John B. Prescott =

Australian retired businessman and corporate (born 1940)

John Prescott AC, FTSE
- Born: John Barry Prescott; 22 October 1940 (age 86); Sydney, Australia
- Education: Bachelor of Commerce (Industrial Relations)
- Alma mater: University of New South Wales

John Barry Prescott (born 22 October 1940) is an Australian retired businessman and corporate bureaucrat who was managing director and CEO of BHP from 1991 to 1998. Over his career, he has held numerous positions including chairman of Queensland Rail and ASC Pty Ltd, and director of Newmont Mining Corporation.

== Education ==
Prescott was educated at North Sydney Boys High School where in 1957 as a pupil he was appointed Deputy Librarian. He received a Bachelor of Commerce (Industrial Relations) from the University of New South Wales in 1961.

== Career ==
=== ~1958–1998: BHP ===
Prescott was an executive of BHP, having been with that company for over 40 years including as an executive director for 10 years and as managing director and chief executive officer from 1991 to 1998. Prescott's time as CEO of BHP coincided with a number of failed investments which lost the company almost $10 billion.'

=== 2000–2009: Australian Submarine Corporation ===
Chairman (2000 – 30 June 2009). Prescott served as chairman of Australian Submarine Corporation, later rebranded ASC Pty Ltd.

=== 2006–2015: Queensland Rail / Aurizon ===
From 2006 to 2010 Prescott was Chairman of the Government of Queensland owned Queensland Rail, that managed the state's passenger and freight railway network. During this time he oversaw the separation of the company into two separate entities: Queensland Rail that operated passenger services and QR National that operated freight services, becoming chairman of the latter. Under Prescott's chairmanship the latter was listed on the Australian Securities Exchange as Aurizon raising $4.6bn in what was the largest initial public offering (IPO) in Australia that year. He was chairman of Aurizon from 2010 to 2015. Under Prescott's Chairmanship the company grew significantly. The company's operating ratio improved from 91% in 2010 to 74% in 2015 and a turn around in safety saw the LTIFR reduced by 97% in this time. Aurizon's share price increased by 95% to $4.96, and under Prescott's stewardship, total shareholder returns increased by 117% from IPO to 30 June 2015.

== Other corporate ==
=== 1998–?: Horizon Private Equity ===
From 1998 Prescott was the executive chairman of Horizon Private Equity.

=== 1999–2013: Normandy Mining / Newmont Mining ===
Prescott served as a non-executive director of Normandy Mining from April 1999 to 2002. He served as an Independent Director of Newmont Mining Corporation from 2002 to 2013 after it purchased Normandy Mining.

=== Other ===
Prescott has been a Global Counsellor of The Conference Board since 2001, a member of the Global Advisory Council since 2013, and a member of the Commonwealth Remuneration Tribunal since 2010. Other Directorships and consulting/advisory positions have included Conference Board USA, World Economic Forum, Booz Allen Hamilton, J.P. Morgan Chase & Co, Proudfoot Consulting and Asia Pacific Advisory Committee of New York Stock Exchange.

== Honours and awards ==
Prescott was appointed a Companion of the Order of Australia in 1996 and received the Centenary Medal in 2003.

Fellow of the Australian Institute of Company Directors, the Australian Academy of Technological Sciences and Engineering, and the Australian Institute of Management.

He was awarded an Honorary Doctor of Laws from Monash University in 1994 and an Honorary Doctor of Science from the University of New South Wales awarded in 1995.

In 2016 Monash University inaugurated a series of public lectures in his name which focus on human resources, industrial relations and related areas. The University of NSW awards two scholarships named after Prescott – the John Prescott Scholarship in Human Resource Management and the John Prescott Outstanding Teaching Innovation Award.

He has also held the positions of director of the Walter and Eliza Hall Institute of Medical Research, and member then director of the Business Council of Australia.
