= Alexei L. Efros =

American theoretical physicist (born 1938)

Alexei Efros
- Born: 1938 (age 87–88); Leningrad, USSR
- Education: Leningrad Polytechnic Institute; Ioffe Physico-Technical Institute
- Known for: Efros–Shklovskii variable-range hopping
- Children: Alexei A. Efros
- Relatives: Alexander Efros (brother)
- Awards: Landau Prize (1986); Fellow of the American Physical Society (1992); Humboldt Prize (1997); Oliver E. Buckley Condensed Matter Prize (2018)
- Scientific career
- Workplaces: Ioffe Physico-Technical Institute; UC Riverside; University of Utah
- Theses: Quantum Theory of Conductivity in Strong Magnetic Fields (1962); Theory of Heavily doped semiconductors (1972)

Alexei Lvovich Efros (Russian: Алексей Львович Эфрос, born 1938) is an American theoretical physicist who specializes in condensed matter physics. He is currently a distinguished professor at University of Utah.

== Biography ==
Efros was born in 1938 in Leningrad, Soviet Union. He received his Master of Science from Leningrad Polytechnic Institute in 1961, and his PhD from the Ioffe Physico-Technical Institute in 1962. Following graduation, he continued working at the Ioffe Institute and in the process received a second PhD in 1972 in semiconductor physics. In 1986, he received the Landau Prize in theoretical physics from the Soviet Academy of Sciences. In 1987 he was promoted to principal scientist at the Ioffe Institute and served as a professor in the Leningrad Electro-Technical Institute. During the dissolution of the Soviet Union in 1989 he emigrated to the United States and was a visiting distinguished scholar at University of California, Riverside. In 1991, he moved to the University of Utah and was promoted to distinguished professor in 1994. In 1992, he was elected a fellow of the American Physical Society "for his work on the theory of transport in disordered systems". In 1997, he received the Humboldt Prize.

In 2018, he received the 2019 Oliver E. Buckley Condensed Matter Physics Prize for "pioneering research in the physics of disordered materials and hopping conductivity" together with Elihu Abrahams and Boris I. Shklovskii.

== Personal life ==
Efros's son, Alexei A. Efros is an associate professor of computer science at UC Berkeley.
