= List of members of the National Academy of Sciences (physics) =

This list is a subsection of the List of members of the National Academy of Sciences, which includes members and international members of the United States National Academy of Sciences, living and deceased, each affiliated with one of the academy's disciplinary sections. Members are listed under their primary section, and each entry gives the person's name, primary institution, and election year. For deceased members, the year of death is noted.

Name	Institution	Year
G. 't Hooft	Utrecht University	1984
Anatole Abragam (died 2011)	Collège de France	1977
Elihu Abrahams (died 2018)	Rutgers, The State University of New Jersey, New Brunswick	1987
Robert K. Adair (died 2020)	Yale University	1976
Eric G. Adelberger	University of Washington	1994
Stephen L. Adler	Institute for Advanced Study	1975
Harold M. Agnew (died 2013)	General Atomics	1979
Yakir Aharonov	Chapman University	1993
Guenter Ahlers	University of California, Santa Barbara	1982
Samuel Allison (died 1965)	The University of Chicago	1946
Luis W. Alvarez (died 1988)	University of California, Berkeley	1947
Edoardo Amaldi (died 1989)	University of Rome	1962
Herbert L. Anderson (died 1988)	Los Alamos National Laboratory	1960
Carl D. Anderson (died 1991)	California Institute of Technology	1938
Philip W. Anderson (died 2020)	Princeton University	1967
Eva Y. Andrei	Rutgers, The State University of New Jersey, New Brunswick	2013
Elena Aprile	Columbia University	2021
Nima Arkani-Hamed	Institute for Advanced Study	2017
N. W. Ashcroft (died 2021)	Cornell University	1997
Arthur Ashkin (died 2020)	Bell Laboratories, Lucent Technologies	1996
Abhay V. Ashtekar	The Pennsylvania State University	2016
Alain Aspect	Institut d'Optique	2008
Robert H. Austin	Princeton University	1999
Robert F. Bacher (died 2004)	California Institute of Technology	1947
Vanderlei Salvador Bagnato	University of Sao Paulo	2013
Kenneth T. Bainbridge (died 1996)	Harvard University	1946
Leon Balents	University of California, Santa Barbara	2019
Thomas Banks	Rutgers, The State University of New Jersey, New Brunswick	2023
James M. Bardeen (died 2022)	University of Washington	2012
John Bardeen (died 1991)	University of Illinois Urbana-Champaign	1954
William A. Bardeen (died 2025)	Fermi National Accelerator Laboratory	1999
Valentine Bargmann (died 1989)	Princeton University	1979
Barry C. Barish	California Institute of Technology	2002
Henry H. Barschall (died 1997)	University of Wisconsin-Madison	1972
Laura Baudis	University of Zurich	2025
Gordon A. Baym	University of Illinois Urbana-Champaign	1982
George B. Benedek	Massachusetts Institute of Technology	1981
Charles L. Bennett	Johns Hopkins University	2005
James C. Bergquist	National Institute of Standards and Technology	2009
Stephan Berko (died 1991)	Brandeis University	1988
Zvi Bern	University of California, Los Angeles	2024
Nora Berrah	University of Connecticut	2024
Michael Berry	University of Bristol	1995
Hans A. Bethe (died 2005)	Cornell University	1944
William Bialek	Princeton University	2012
Ludwig Biermann (died 1986)	Max Planck Institute for Extraterrestrial Physics	1976
James Daniel Bjorken (died 2024)	Stanford University	1973
Rainer Blatt	University of Innsbruck	2019
Walker Bleakney (died 1992)	Princeton University	1959
Nicolaas Bloembergen (died 2017)	University of Arizona	1960
Felix Boehm (died 2021)	California Institute of Technology	1983
Nikolai N. Bogolubov (died 1992)	Joint Institute for Nuclear Research	1969
Aage Bohr (died 2009)	University of Copenhagen	2009
N. E. Bradbury (died 1997)	Los Alamos National Laboratory	1951
Vladimir B. Braginsky (died 2016)	Moscow State University	2006
Gilles Brassard	University of Montreal	2021
Walter H. Brattain (died 1987)	Whitman College	1959
Gregory Breit (died 1981)	University of Wisconsin-Madison	1939
Richard G. Brewer (died 2012)	International Business Machines Corporation	1980
Édouard Brézin	Ecole Normale Superieure	2003
Robert B. Brode (died 1986)	University of California, Berkeley	1949
D. Allan Bromley (died 2005)	Yale University	1990
Gerald E. Brown (died 2013)	Stony Brook University	1978
Keith A. Brueckner (died 2014)	University of California, San Diego	1969
Philip H. Bucksbaum	Stanford University	2004
Claudio W. Bunster	Instituto de Ciencia y Exploración (ICE)	2005
Alessandra Buonanno	Max Planck Institute for Gravitational Physics (Albert Einstein Institute)	2021
Nicola Cabibbo (died 2010)	Sapienza University of Rome	1982
Blas Cabrera	Stanford University	2020
Curtis G. Callan Jr.	Princeton University	1989
Carlton M. Caves	The University of New Mexico	2020
David M. Ceperley	University of Illinois Urbana-Champaign	2006
Owen Chamberlain (died 2006)	University of California, Berkeley	1960
Moses H. W. Chan	The Pennsylvania State University	2000
Georges Charpak (died 2010)	European Organization for Nuclear Research	1986
Pavel Cherenkov (died 1990)	Russian Academy of Sciences	1985
Geoffrey F. Chew (died 2019)	University of California, Berkeley	1962
Robert F. Christy (died 2012)	California Institute of Technology	1965
Steven Chu	Stanford University	1993
John Clarke	University of California, Berkeley	2012
Marvin L. Cohen	University of California, Berkeley	1980
Claude Cohen-Tannoudji	Collège de France	1994
Sidney R. Coleman (died 2007)	Harvard University	1980
Eugene D. Commins (died 2015)	University of California, Berkeley	1987
Rodney L. Cool (died 1988)	The Rockefeller University	1972
France Anne-Dominic Córdova	Science Philanthropy Alliance	2022
Eric A. Cornell	National Institute of Standards and Technology	2000
Alan Cottrell (died 2012)	University of Cambridge	1972
Ernest D. Courant (died 2020)	Brookhaven National Laboratory	1976
Ramanath Cowsik	Washington University in St. Louis	2004
H. Richard Crane (died 2007)	University of Michigan	1966
Edward C. Creutz (died 2009)	Bishop Museum	1975
Albert V. Crewe (died 2009)	University of Chicago	1972
James W. Cronin (died 2016)	University of Chicago	1970
Leticia Cugliandolo	Sorbonne University	2024
Jean Dalibard	Collège de France	2020
Richard H. Dalitz (died 2006)	University of Oxford	1991
Roger Dashen (died 1995)	University of California, San Diego	1984
J. C. Séamus Davis	University of Oxford	2010
Louis de Broglie (died 1987)	University of Paris	1948
Pierre-Gilles de Gennes (died 2007)	Collège de France	1987
Hans G. Dehmelt (died 2017)	University of Washington	1978
David DeMille	Johns Hopkins University	2024
Stanley Deser (died 2023)	Brandeis University	1994
Martin Deutsch (died 2002)	Massachusetts Institute of Technology	1958
Mark J. Devlin	University of Pennsylvania	2025
Michel H. Devoret	Yale University	2023
Bryce DeWitt (died 2004)	The University of Texas at Austin	1990
Robert H. Dicke (died 1997)	Princeton University	1967
Savas Dimopoulos	Stanford University	2021
Michael Dine	University of California, Santa Cruz	2019
Brenda L. Dingus	Los Alamos National Laboratory	2025
Lance Dixon	SLAC National Accelerator Laboratory	2022
John M. Doyle	Harvard University	2025
Persis S. Drell	Stanford University	2010
Sidney D. Drell (died 2016)	Stanford University	1969
Lee Alvin DuBridge (died 1994)	California Institute of Technology	1943
Freeman J. Dyson (died 2020)	Institute for Advanced Study	1964
William M. Fairbank (died 1989)	Stanford University	1963
Roger W. Falcone	University of California, Berkeley	2019
Ugo Fano (died 2001)	The University of Chicago	1976
Glennys R. Farrar	New York University	2023
Eugene Feenberg (died 1977)	Washington University in St. Louis	1975
Herman Feshbach (died 2000)	Massachusetts Institute of Technology	1969
Daniel S. Fisher	Stanford University	2015
Val L. Fitch (died 2015)	Princeton University	1966
Bonnie T. Fleming	Fermi National Accelerator Laboratory	2024
Vladimir E. Fortov (died 2020)	Russian Academy of Sciences	2014
E. Norval Fortson	University of Washington	1998
William A. Fowler (died 1995)	California Institute of Technology	1956
Eduardo Fradkin	University of Illinois Urbana-Champaign	2013
James Franck (died 1964)	The University of Chicago	1944
Hans Frauenfelder (died 2022)	Los Alamos National Laboratory	1975
Daniel Z. Freedman	Massachusetts Institute of Technology	2021
Stuart J. Freedman (died 2012)	University of California, Berkeley	2001
Katherine Freese	The University of Texas at Austin	2020
Jerome I. Friedman	Massachusetts Institute of Technology	1992
Joshua A. Frieman	SLAC National Accelerator Laboratory	2022
Gerald Gabrielse	Northwestern University	2007
Mary K. Gaillard (died 2025)	University of California, Berkeley	1991
George Gamow (died 1968)	University of Colorado Boulder	1953
Margaret Gardel	The University of Chicago	2025
Richard L. Garwin (died 2025)	International Business Machines Corporation	1966
S. James Gates Jr.	University of Maryland, College Park	2013
Murray Gell-Mann (died 2019)	Santa Fe Institute	1960
Margaret J. Geller	Smithsonian Astrophysical Observatory	1992
Antoine Georges	Collège de France	2023
Howard Georgi	Harvard University	1995
Fabiola Gianotti	European Organization for Nuclear Research	2015
Vitaly L. Ginzburg (died 2009)	Russian Academy of Sciences	1981
Sheldon L. Glashow	Boston University	1977
Roy J. Glauber (died 2018)	Harvard University	1988
Marvin L. Goldberger (died 2014)	University of California, San Diego	1963
Gerson Goldhaber (died 2010)	University of California, Berkeley	1977
Gertrude S. Goldhaber (died 1998)	Brookhaven National Laboratory	1972
Maurice Goldhaber (died 2011)	Brookhaven National Laboratory	1958
Gabriela González	Louisiana State University	2017
Lev P. Gor’kov (died 2016)	Florida State University	2005
Walter Gordy (died 1985)	Duke University	1964
Samuel Goudsmit (died 1978)	Brookhaven National Laboratory	1947
Chris H. Greene	Purdue University	2019
Kenneth I. Greisen (died 2007)	Cornell University	1974
David J. Gross	University of California, Santa Barbara	1986
Alan H. Guth	Massachusetts Institute of Technology	1989
Martin C. Gutzwiller (died 2014)	International Business Machines Corporation	1992
Willy Haeberli (died 2021)	University of Wisconsin-Madison	2002
Erwin Hahn (died 2016)	University of California, Berkeley	1972
F. Duncan M. Haldane	Princeton University	2017
John L. Hall	University of Colorado Boulder	1984
Bertrand I. Halperin	Harvard University	1982
Francis Halzen	University of Wisconsin-Madison	2024
Theodor W. Hänsch	Max Planck Institute for Quantum Optics	2001
William Happer	Princeton University	1996
Serge Haroche	Collège de France	2010
James B. Hartle (died 2023)	University of California, Santa Barbara	1991
Jeffrey A. Harvey	The University of Chicago	2014
Wick C. Haxton	University of California, Berkeley	1999
Moty Heiblum	Weizmann Institute of Science	2025
Ernest M. Henley (died 2017)	University of Washington	1979
Raymond G. Herb (died 1996)	National Electrostatics Corporation	1955
W. Conyers Herring (died 2009)	Stanford University	1968
David W. Hertzog	University of Washington	2025
Gerhard Herzberg (died 1999)	National Research Council of Canada	1968
Karl Herzfeld (died 1978)	Catholic University of America	1960
Harald Hess	Howard Hughes Medical Institute	2018
Robert Hofstadter (died 1990)	Stanford University	1958
Pierre C. Hohenberg (died 2017)	New York University	1989
John J. Hopfield	Princeton University	1973
Gary T. Horowitz	University of California, Santa Barbara	2010
Wayne Hu	The University of Chicago	2016
Vernon W. Hughes (died 2003)	Yale University	1967
Terence T. Hwa	University of California, San Diego	2020
Joseph Incandela	University of California, Santa Barbara	2015
Barbara V. Jacak	Lawrence Berkeley National Laboratory	2009
Roman Jackiw (died 2023)	Massachusetts Institute of Technology	1998
J. D. Jackson (died 2016)	University of California, Berkeley	1990
A. Javan (died 2016)	Massachusetts Institute of Technology	1974
Carson D. Jeffries (died 1995)	University of California, Berkeley	1983
Deborah S. Jin (died 2016)	National Institute of Standards and Technology	2005
Paul S. Julienne	University of Maryland, College Park	2023
Leo P. Kadanoff (died 2015)	The University of Chicago	1978
Takaaki Kajita	The University of Tokyo	2022
Vassiliki (Vicky) Kalogera	Northwestern University	2018
Marc P. Kamionkowski	Johns Hopkins University	2019
Aharon Kapitulnik	Stanford University	2015
David B. Kaplan	University of Washington	2013
Henry Kapteyn	University of Colorado Boulder	2013
Mark A. Kasevich	Stanford University	2022
Edwin C. Kemble (died 1984)	Harvard University	1931
Henry W. Kendall (died 1999)	Massachusetts Institute of Technology	1992
Donald W. Kerst (died 1993)	University of Wisconsin-Madison	1951
Wolfgang Ketterle	Massachusetts Institute of Technology	2002
Young-Kee Kim	The University of Chicago	2022
H. Jeffrey Kimble (died 2024)	California Institute of Technology	2002
Toichiro Kinoshita (died 2023)	Cornell University	1991
Alexei Y. Kitaev	California Institute of Technology	2021
Charles Kittel (died 2019)	University of California, Berkeley	1957
Steven A. Kivelson	Stanford University	2010
Igor R. Klebanov	Princeton University	2016
Martin J. Klein (died 2009)	Yale University	1977
Daniel Kleppner (died 2025)	Massachusetts Institute of Technology	1986
Walter D. Knight (died 2000)	University of California, Berkeley	1985
Walter Kohn (died 2016)	University of California, Santa Barbara	1969
Jun Kondo (died 2022)	National Institute of Advanced Industrial Science and Technology	2009
Steven E. Koonin	Hoover Institution	2010
Masatoshi Koshiba (died 2020)	The University of Tokyo	2005
J. Michael Kosterlitz	Brown University	2017
William L. Kraushaar (died 2008)	University of Wisconsin–Madison	1973
Norman M. Kroll (died 2004)	University of California, San Diego	1974
Ryogo Kubo (died 1995)	Keio University	1974
P. Kusch (died 1993)	University of Texas at Dallas	1956
Anne L’Huillier	Lund University	2018
Willis E. Lamb Jr. (died 2008)	University of Arizona	1954
Edwin H. Land (died 1991)	Rowland Institute for Science	1953
Andrew E. Lange (died 2010)	California Institute of Technology	2004
Robert B. Laughlin	Stanford University	1994
Benjamin Lax (died 2015)	Massachusetts Institute of Technology	1969
Leon M. Lederman (died 2018)	Fermi National Accelerator Laboratory	1965
David M. Lee	Texas A&M University-College Station	1991
Tsung-Dao Lee (died 2024)	Columbia University	1964
Anthony Leggett (died 2026)	University of Illinois Urbana-Champaign	1997
Stanislas Leibler	The Rockefeller University	2016
G. Peter Lepage	Cornell University	2022
Herbert Levine	Northeastern University	2011
Albert Libchaber	The Rockefeller University	2007
Andrei Linde	Stanford University	2008
Michal Lipson	Columbia University	2019
Chen-Yu Liu	University of Illinois Urbana-Champaign	2024
M. Stanley Livingston (died 1986)	Massachusetts Institute of Technology	1970
Francis E. Low (died 2007)	Massachusetts Institute of Technology	1967
Joaquin M. Luttinger (died 1997)	Columbia University	1976
Juan Maldacena	Institute for Advanced Study	2013
Leonard Mandel (died 2001)	University of Rochester	2001
Peter Mansfield (died 2017)	University of Nottingham	2009
Charles M. Marcus	University of Washington	2018
Robert E. Marshak (died 1992)	Virginia Polytechnic Institute	1958
Paul C. Martin (died 2016)	Harvard University	1979
Nadya Mason	The University of Chicago	2021
John C. Mather	NASA Goddard Space Flight Center	1997
Nergis Mavalvala	Massachusetts Institute of Technology	2017
Boyce D. McDaniel (died 2002)	Cornell University	1981
Arthur B. McDonald	Queen's University	2016
Edwin M. McMillan (died 1991)	University of California, Berkeley	1947
N. David Mermin	Cornell University	1991
Christopher Monroe	Duke University	2016
Gregory W. Moore	Rutgers, The State University of New Jersey, New Brunswick	2020
Philip Morrison (died 2005)	Massachusetts Institute of Technology	1971
Philip M. Morse (died 1985)	Massachusetts Institute of Technology	1955
Rudolf L. Mössbauer (died 2011)	Technical University of Munich	1978
Nevill Mott (died 1996)	University of Cambridge	1957
Ben R. Mottelson (died 2022)	Nordic Institute for Theoretical Physics	1973
Margaret M. Murnane	University of Colorado at Boulder	2004
Yoichiro Nambu (died 2015)	The University of Chicago	1973
Yuval Ne’eman (died 2006)	Tel Aviv University	1972
Ann E. Nelson (died 2019)	University of Washington	2012
David R. Nygren	The University of Texas at Arlington	2000
Brian O’Brien (died 1992)	No Affiliation	1954
Giuseppe Occhialini (died 1993)	University of Milan	1978
Piermaria J. Oddone	Fermi National Accelerator Laboratory	2011
Angela Villela Olinto	Columbia University	2021
Nai Phuan Ong	Princeton University	2012
José N. Onuchic	Rice University	2006
Douglas D. Osheroff	Stanford University	1987
Albert W. Overhauser (died 2011)	Purdue University	1976
Lyman A. Page Jr.	Princeton University	2006
Abraham Pais (died 2000)	The Rockefeller University	1962
George E. Pake (died 2004)	Xerox Palo Alto Research Center	1976
Robert B. Palmer	Brookhaven National Laboratory	2008
W. K. H. Panofsky (died 2007)	Stanford University	1954
Rudolf Peierls (died 1995)	University of Oxford	1970
Claudio Pellegrini	University of California, Los Angeles	2017
Roger Penrose	University of Oxford	1998
Martin L. Perl (died 2014)	SLAC National Accelerator Laboratory	1981
Saul Perlmutter	Lawrence Berkeley National Laboratory	2002
William D. Phillips	National Institute of Standards and Technology	1997
David Pines (died 2018)	Los Alamos National Laboratory	1973
Joseph G. Polchinski (died 2018)	University of California, Santa Barbara	2005
Alexander Polyakov	Princeton University	2005
Robert V. Pound (died 2010)	Harvard University	1961
Charles Y. Prescott	SLAC National Accelerator Laboratory	2001
John Preskill	California Institute of Technology	2014
David E. Pritchard	Massachusetts Institute of Technology	1999
E. M. Purcell (died 1997)	Harvard University	1951
Helen R. Quinn	SLAC National Accelerator Laboratory	2003
I. I. Rabi (died 1988)	Columbia University	1940
L. James Rainwater (died 1986)	Columbia University	1968
Norman F. Ramsey (died 2011)	Harvard University	1952
Lisa Randall	Harvard University	2008
Nicholas Read	Yale University	2017
Frederick Reines (died 1998)	University of California, Irvine	1980
John D. Reppy	Cornell University	1988
Paul L. Richards (died 2024)	University of California, Berkeley	1985
Robert C. Richardson (died 2013)	Cornell University	1986
Burton Richter (died 2018)	Stanford University	1977
R. G. Hamish Robertson	University of Washington	2004
Heinrich Rohrer (died 2013)	International Business Machines Corporation	1988
Bruno B. Rossi (died 1993)	Massachusetts Institute of Technology	1950
Carlo Rubbia	European Organization for Nuclear Research	1987
Malvin A. Ruderman (died 2024)	Columbia University	1972
David P. Ruelle	Institut des Hautes Études Scientifiques	2002
Subir Sachdev	Harvard University	2014
Robert G. Sachs (died 1999)	The University of Chicago	1971
Bernard Sadoulet	University of California, Berkeley	2012
Andrei Sakharov (died 1989)	No Affiliation	1973
Abdus Salam (died 1996)	International Centre for Theoretical Physics	1979
Nicholas P. Samios	Brookhaven National Laboratory	1982
Jack Sandweiss (died 2020)	Yale University	1987
Douglas J. Scalapino	University of California, Santa Barbara	1991
Arthur L. Schawlow (died 1999)	Stanford University	1970
Heidi M. Schellman	Oregon State University	2025
John P. Schiffer (died 2022)	Argonne National Laboratory	1987
Kate Scholberg	Duke University	2022
David N. Schramm (died 1997)	The University of Chicago	1986
J. Robert Schrieffer (died 2019)	Florida State University	1971
Bernard F. Schutz	Cardiff University	2019
Melvin Schwartz (died 2006)	Columbia University	1975
John H. Schwarz	California Institute of Technology	1997
Julian Schwinger (died 1994)	University of California, Los Angeles	1949
Frank J. Sciulli	Columbia University	2009
Emilio Segrè (died 1989)	University of California, Berkeley	1952
Nathan Seiberg	Institute for Advanced Study	2008
Frederick Seitz (died 2008)	Rockefeller University	1951
Robert Serber (died 1997)	Columbia University	1952
Andrew M. Sessler (died 2014)	University of California, Berkeley	1990
Stephen H. Shenker	Stanford University	2015
Mikhail Shifman	University of Minnesota	2018
Melvyn J. Shochet	The University of Chicago	2006
Boris Shraiman	University of California, Santa Barbara	2011
Clifford G. Shull (died 2001)	Massachusetts Institute of Technology	1975
Kai Siegbahn (died 2007)	University of Uppsala	1983
Eric D. Siggia	The Rockefeller University	2009
Joseph Silk	Universite Pierre et Marie Curie	2014
Charles P. Slichter (died 2018)	University of Illinois at Urbana–Champaign	1967
George Smoot (died 2025)	Donostia International Physics Center	2008
Dam Thanh Son	University of Chicago	2014
Peter P. Sorokin (died 2015)	International Business Machines Corporation	1976
Suzanne Staggs	Princeton University	2020
Alexei Alexandrovich Starobinsky (died 2023)	Landau Institute of Theoretical Physics	2017
Paul J. Steinhardt	Princeton University	1998
J. Curry Street (died 1989)	Harvard University	1953
Andrew Strominger	Harvard University	2011
Harry Suhl (died 2020)	University of California, San Diego	1976
Leonard Susskind	Stanford University	2000
David W. Tank	Princeton University	2001
Richard E. Taylor (died 2018)	Stanford University	1993
Valentine L. Telegdi (died 2006)	European Organization for Nuclear Research	1968
Edward Teller (died 2003)	Lawrence Livermore National Laboratory	1948
Saul A. Teukolsky	Cornell University	2003
Walter E. Thirring (died 2014)	University of Vienna	1988
Kip S. Thorne	California Institute of Technology	1973
Maury Tigner	Cornell University	1993
Samuel C. C. Ting	Massachusetts Institute of Technology	1977
Michael Tinkham (died 2010)	Harvard University	1970
Senthil Todadri	Massachusetts Institute of Technology	2024
Alvin V. Tollestrup (died 2020)	Fermi National Accelerator Laboratory	1996
Akira Tonomura (died 2012)	Hitachi, Ltd.	2000
Charles Hard Townes (died 2015)	University of California, Berkeley	1956
John M. Tranquada	Brookhaven National Laboratory	2023
Sam Treiman (died 1999)	Princeton University	1972
George H. Trilling (died 2020)	University of California, Berkeley	1983
Michael S. Turner	University of Chicago	1997
George E. Uhlenbeck (died 1988)	The Rockefeller University	1955
Cumrun Vafa	Harvard University	2009
Dale J. Van Harlingen (died 2024)	University of Illinois at Urbana–Champaign	2003
Leon Van Hove (died 1990)	European Organization for Nuclear Research	1980
Martinus Veltman (died 2021)	University of Michigan	2000
Alexander Vilenkin	Tufts University	2020
Aleksandra M. Walczak	Centre National de la Recherche Scientifique	2025
Robert M. Wald	University of Chicago	2001
Michelle D. Wang	Cornell University	2023
Yifang Wang	Institute of High Energy Physics	2024
Kenneth M. Watson (died 2023)	University of California, San Diego	1974
Steven Weinberg (died 2021)	University of Texas at Austin	1972
Rainer Weiss (died 2025)	Massachusetts Institute of Technology	2000
Victor F. Weisskopf (died 2002)	Massachusetts Institute of Technology	1952
Xiao-Gang Wen	Massachusetts Institute of Technology	2018
Gregor Wentzel (died 1978)	University of Chicago	1959
John C. Wheatley (died 1986)	Los Alamos National Laboratory	1975
John Archibald Wheeler (died 2008)	Princeton University	1952
Gian-Carlo Wick (died 1992)	Scuola Normale Superiore di Pisa	1963
Carl E. Wieman	Stanford University	1995
Arthur S. Wightman (died 2013)	Princeton University	1970
Eugene P. Wigner (died 1995)	Princeton University	1945
Frank A. Wilczek	Massachusetts Institute of Technology	1990
David T. Wilkinson (died 2002)	Princeton University	1983
Clifford G. Will	University of Florida	2007
Kenneth G. Wilson (died 2013)	The Ohio State University	1975
Robert R. Wilson (died 2000)	Cornell University	1957
David J. Wineland	University of Oregon	1992
Bruce D. Winstein (died 2011)	The University of Chicago	1995
Mark B. Wise	California Institute of Technology	2007
Michael S. Witherell	Lawrence Berkeley National Laboratory	1998
Edward Witten	Institute for Advanced Study	1988
Lincoln Wolfenstein (died 2015)	Carnegie Mellon University	1978
Stanford E. Woosley	University of California, Santa Cruz	2006
C. S. Wu (died 1997)	Columbia University	1958
Amir Yacoby	Harvard University	2019
Chen N. Yang (died 2025)	State University of New York at Stony Brook	1965
Jun Ye	National Institute of Standards and Technology	2011
Jerrold R. Zacharias (died 1986)	Massachusetts Institute of Technology	1957
Matias Zaldarriaga	Institute for Advanced Study	2018
Alexander B. Zamolodchikov	Stony Brook University	2016
Shoucheng Zhang (died 2018)	Stanford University	2015
Guangzhao Zhou	China Association for Science and Technology	1987
Peter Zoller	University of Innsbruck	2008
Bruno Zumino (died 2014)	University of California, Berkeley	1985
Wojciech H. Zurek	Los Alamos National Laboratory	2024
Ellen G. Zweibel	University of Wisconsin-Madison	2021
George Zweig	Massachusetts Institute of Technology	1996
