= Walter Benenson =

American physicist

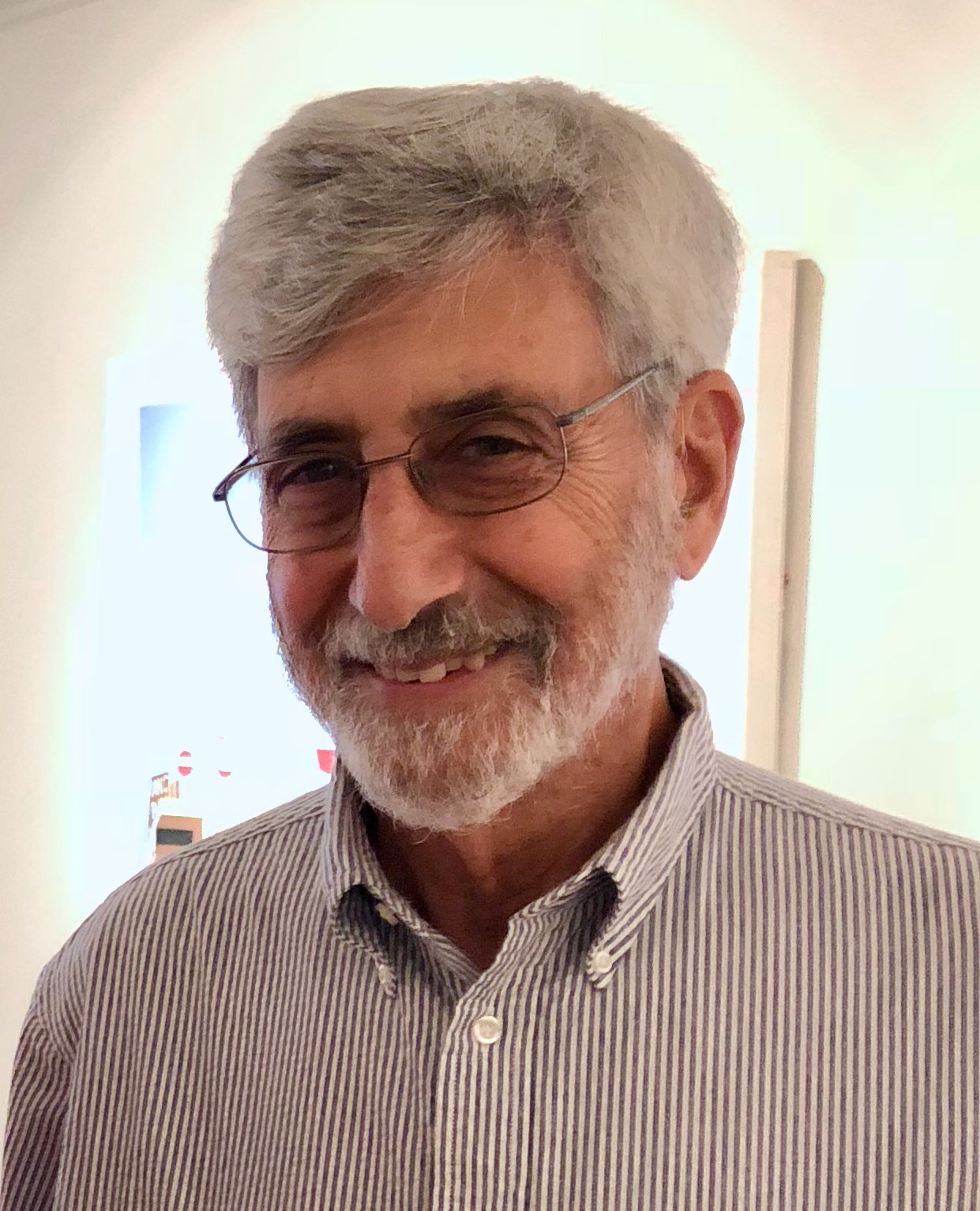
- Born: April 27, 1936 (age 90)
- Citizenship: United States
- Education: Yale
- Known for: Low energy heavy ion physics
- Awards: Humboldt Prize; Fellow of the American Physical Society
- Scientific career
- Fields: Physics
- Workplaces: University of Strasbourg; Michigan State University
- Doctoral advisor: Henry H. Barschall

Walter Benenson (born April 27, 1936) is a university distinguished professor emeritus in the department of physics and astronomy at Michigan State University. He retired in 2008, but continued to teach for another 10 years.

== Research ==
Walter Benenson obtained his Ph.D. in experimental nuclear physics from the University of Wisconsin in 1962 under the supervision of H.H. Barschall. After a post-doctoral fellowship at the University of Strasbourg, he joined the faculty at Michigan State University in 1963. He was one of the core group of faculty who built the K-50 Cyclotron at Michigan State University. This project later became the National Superconducting Laboratory and eventually FRIB, the Facility for Rare Isotope Beams.

=== Nuclear physics ===
Prof. Benenson has a dual appointment at the National Superconducting Cyclotron Laboratory, where he works on nuclear physics topics. He is best known for his work on nuclei far-from-stability in which he observed and did precise measurements of the mass of 45 nuclei for the first time. Several of these nuclei were important for astrophysical studies. He is also known for his work on sub-threshold particle production in heavy ion collisions, isobaric quartets in nuclei, and measurement of temperatures in nuclear reactions

=== Textbook ===
Prof. Benenson taught physics and astronomy classes on the undergraduate and graduate level since 1963. He is particularly interested in the introductory physics curriculum for life science majors. For decades he has collaborated closely with his MSU colleagues Wolfgang Bauer and Gary Westfall. They obtained NSF funding to develop novel teaching and laboratory techniques, and authored multimedia physics CDs for their students at MSU's Lyman Briggs School. Based on this work they co-authored cliXX Physik, a complete physics textbook on CD-rom. In 1992, they became early adopters of the Internet for teaching and learning by developing the first version of their online homework system. In subsequent years, they were instrumental in creating the LearningOnline Network with CAPA (LON-CAPA), which is now used at more than 70 universities and colleges in the United States and around the world.

== Administrative positions ==
- Member, IUPAP Commission on Symbols, Units, Nomenclature, Atomic Masses and Fundamental Constants (1976–1982)
- Associate director, Michigan State Cyclotron (1980–1982)
- Associate director, National Superconducting Cyclotron Laboratory (1990–1995)
- Member, Nuclear Science Advisory Committee (1993–1996)
- Associate editor, Physical Review C (1997–2000)

== Honors ==
Benenson was elected Fellow of the American Physical Society in 1978. He was awarded the Alexander-von-Humboldt Foundation Distinguished Senior U.S. Scientist Award (Humboldt-Forschungspreis für Naturwissenschafler aus den USA, Humboldt Prize) in 1989. He received the MSU Distinguished Faculty Award and the MSU Golden Key Research Award in 1993. In 1996 he received the Eminent Scientist Award from the Institute for Chemical and Physical Research, Japan. In 1997 he was designated as university distinguished professor at Michigan State University. He was one of the only 130 MSU professors cited for major contributions to the university over its entire history.

== Publications ==
=== Scientific publications ===
- Walter Benenson publications indexed by Google Scholar

=== Textbooks ===
- Bauer, W.; Benenson, W.; Westfall, G.D. (2012). cliXX Physik (Version 2.5). Harri Deutsch.
- Benenson, W.; Harris, J.W.; Stoecker, H.; Lutz, H. (2006). Handbook of Physics. Springer.
