= Joel M. Moss =

American physicist

Joel Marshall Moss (born November 29, 1942) is an American experimental nuclear physicist.

== Education and career ==
Moss received his bachelor's degree from Fort Hays State University in 1964 and his doctorate in physics from the University of California, Berkeley in 1969. As a postdoc he was from 1969 to 1971 a research associate at the Saclay Nuclear Research Centre and from 1971 to 1973 an instructor in physics at the University of Minnesota. He was from 1973 to 1978 an assistant professor and from 1978 to 1980 associate professor at Texas A&M University. There he studied giant resonances of atomic nuclei with Texas A&M's cyclotron and introduced a new technique of focal plane polarimetry using a high-efficiency, high-resolution polarimeter in conjunction with an Enge split-pole spectrograph.

In 1979 he became a researcher in the physics division of Los Alamos National Laboratory (LANL), where he developed and applied his technique of focal plane polarimetry at Los Alamos Meson Physics Facility (LAMPF) and also at the cyclotron of Indiana University. For example, he used his polarimetry technique to search (unsuccessfully) for collective pion excitations in nuclei in spin-sensitive experiments. At LANL he was steadily promoted: Leader of the Nuclear Physics Group from 1982 to 1984, Leader from of the Medium Energy Physics Group from 1984 to 1987, Deputy Division Leader of the Medium Energy Physics Group from 1987 to 1993, and Program Director of Nuclear and Particle Physics from 1988 to 1990.

In 1986 Moss became the spokesperson for the E772 experiment at Fermilab, which involved dimuon production (i.e. of muon pairs via a Drell–Yan process and from charmonium decays) in high-energy proton-nucleus collisions with 800 GeV protons at the Tevatron. In particular, they obtained information about the antiquark distribution of sea quarks in the nucleons in the nuclei of hydrogen and deuterium targets and were able to study their dependence on the mass number of the nucleus. There was no mass-number-dependent modification (i.e. a different behavior of nucleons in nuclei than in free nucleons), as was observed in 1983 in the EMC effect found in the European Muon Collaboration experiments on deep inelastic lepton scattering on nuclear targets. This was contrary to what was expected from the explanation of the EMC effect from pion effects (increased occurrence of antiquarks) in nuclei. E772 could not detect any such antiquark enhancement. In addition, the E772 science team gained evidence of charmonium and charm formation in nuclei from dimuon generation.

He was also involved in experiments on deep inelastic scattering from nuclei and nucleons at Fermilab. He participated in experiments at the PHENIX detector of the RHIC heavy ion accelerator to study high-energy nuclear collisions and the spin structure of the nucleon.

In 1983 Moss was elected a Fellow of the American Physical Society. In 1998 he received the Tom W. Bonner Prize in Nuclear Physics with citation:

"For his pioneering experiments using dimuon production in proton-nucleus interactions which demonstrate that there is no antiquark enhancement in nuclei, and which delineate the characteristics of charmonium and open charm production in nuclear systems.
