= Wolfgang Bauer (physicist) =

German physicist

Wolfgang W. Bauer
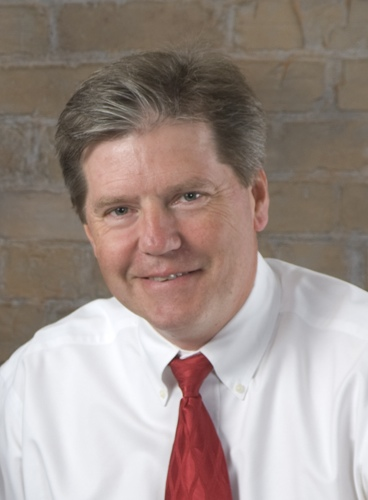
- Born: April 5, 1959 (age 67); Nidderau, West Germany
- Education: University of Giessen
- Known for: Phase transitions in nuclear matter Heavy ion reaction theory
- Awards: German National Merit Scholarship (Studienstiftung); NSF Presidential Faculty Fellow Award; Humboldt Prize; Fellow of the American Physical Society
- Scientific career
- Fields: Physics
- Workplaces: California Institute of Technology; Michigan State University
- Doctoral advisor: Ulrich Mosel
- Other academic advisors: George F. Bertsch, Steven E. Koonin

Wolfgang W. Bauer (born April 5, 1959) is a university distinguished professor in the department of physics and astronomy at Michigan State University. He is also an author, with co-author Gary Westfall, of the introductory calculus-based physics textbook "University Physics", published by McGraw-Hill in 2023 (3rd edition).

== Research ==
Wolfgang Bauer obtained his Ph.D. in theoretical nuclear physics from the University of Giessen in 1987. After a post-doctoral fellowship at the California Institute of Technology, he joined the faculty at Michigan State University in 1988. He has worked on a large variety of topics in computational physics, from high-temperature superconductivity to supernova explosions, but has been especially interested in relativistic nuclear collisions. Since 2010 he has concentrated on renewable energy resources (solar arrays, anaerobic digester) and energy conservation measures.

=== Nuclear physics ===
Prof. Bauer is best known for his work on phase transitions of nuclear matter in heavy ion collisions, and transport theory of heavy ion collisions, in particular as applied to interferometry, particle production, collective flow, and isospin degrees of freedom.

=== Teaching, LON-CAPA, and Textbooks ===
Prof. Bauer has taught physics and astronomy classes on the undergraduate and graduate level since 1988. He is particularly interested in the introductory physics curriculum for engineering and science majors. For decades he has collaborated closely with his MSU colleagues Walter Benenson and Gary Westfall. They obtained NSF funding to develop novel teaching and laboratory techniques, and authored multimedia physics CDs for their students at MSU's Lyman Briggs School. Based on this work they co-authored cliXX Physik, a complete physics textbook on CD-rom. In 1992, they became early adopters of the Internet for teaching and learning by developing the first version of their online homework system. In subsequent years, they were instrumental in creating the LearningOnline Network with CAPA (LON-CAPA), which is now used at more than 70 universities and colleges in the United States and around the world. Since 2008, Bauer and Westfall have been part of a team of instructors, engineers, and physicists, who investigate the use of peer-assisted learning in the introductory physics curriculum. This project has received funding from the NSF STEM Talent Expansion Program, and its best practices have been incorporated into their textbook "University Physics", which was published in 2010 by McGraw-Hill, and which has also been translated into Chinese, Korean, Portuguese, and Spanish languages. The second edition was published in 2013, and e-book in 2015. The third edition and e-book were published in 2023. In 2024 his Physics Virtual Laboratories were also published online by McGraw-Hill.

=== Other research topics ===
Prof. Bauer has worked on nonlinear dynamics and chaos, where he is best known for he work on billiards systems and their decays and for his work on buckyball fragmentation. He also worked in bio-medical physics and holds a US patent on cell-by-cell cancer detection. In recent years, he has focused much of his research and teaching on issues concerning energy, including fossil fuel resources, ways to use energy more efficiently, and, in particular, alternative and carbon-neutral energy resources. He has been a member of the group designing the energy transition plan for Michigan State University. Since 2022 Prof. Bauer has worked on new designs for electrical vehicles, in particular new battery designs.

== Administrative positions ==
- Head of Nuclear Theory Group, National Superconducting Cyclotron Laboratory (1997-1998)
- Associate chair and undergraduate program director, department of physics and astronomy, MSU (1998-2001)
- Chairperson, department of physics and astronomy, MSU (2001-2013)
- Founding director of the Institute for Cyber-Enabled Research (2009-2013)
- Senior consultant, Office of the Executive Vice President, MSU (2013-2018)
- Associate vice president for administration, MSU (2018-2020)
- President, MSU Foundation (2019)

== Honors ==
Bauer was awarded the National Science Foundation Presidential Faculty Fellow Award in 1992 and the Alexander-von-Humboldt Foundation Distinguished Senior U.S. Scientist Award (Humboldt-Forschungspreis für Naturwissenschafler aus den USA, Humboldt Prize) in 1999. He was elected Fellow of the American Physical Society in 2003. Also in 2003, Professor Bauer received the ComputerWorld 21st Century Achievement Award for Education and Academia for his work on LON-CAPA, "Judged best IT application in the world in Education and Academia". In 2007 he was named university distinguished professor at Michigan State University. In 2012 he was named Outstanding Referee by the American Physical Society.

== Publications ==
=== Scientific publications ===
- https://scholar.google.com/citations?hl=en&user=oQQOzjUAAAAJ&view_op=list_works

=== Textbooks ===
- Bauer, W.; Westfall, G.D. (2023). University Physics (with Modern Physics) 3rd. ed. McGraw Hill.
  - Korean translation: Bauer, W.; Westfall, G.D. (2011). University Physics (with Modern Physics). McGraw Hill.
  - Spanish translation: Bauer, W.; Westfall, G.D. (2011). Física para ingenieros y científicos. McGraw Hill.
  - Chinese translation: Bauer, W.; Westfall, G.D. (2011). University Physics (with Modern Physics). McGraw Hill.
- Bauer, W.; Benenson, W.; Westfall, G.D. (2012). cliXX Physik (Version 2.5). Harri Deutsch.
- Bauer, W.; Westfall, G.D.; Dias, H. (2012). Física para Universitários, Mecânica. McGraw Hill.
- Bauer, W.; Westfall, G.D.; Dias, H. (2012). Física para Universitários, Eletricidade e Magnetismo. McGraw Hill.
- Bauer, W.; Westfall, G.D.; Dias, H. (2013). Física para Universitários, Relatividade, Oscilações, Ondas e Calor. McGraw Hill.
- Bauer, W.; Westfall, G.D.; Dias, H. (2013). Física para Universitários, Óptica e Física Moderna. McGraw Hill.
- Bauer, W.; Westfall, G.D.; Beer, F.P.; Johnston Jr., E.R.; Mazurek, D.F.; DeWolf, J.T.; Ibarra Escutia, J. (2014). Fundamentos de física. McGraw Hill.
