= Tom W. Bonner Prize =

American award for experimental research in nuclear physics

The Tom W. Bonner Prize in Nuclear Physics is an annual prize awarded by the American Physical Society's Division of Nuclear Physics. Established in 1964, and currently consisting of $10,000 and a certificate, the Bonner Prize was founded in memory of physicist Tom W. Bonner. The aim of the prize, as stated by the American Physical Society is:

To recognize and encourage outstanding experimental research in nuclear physics, including the development of a method, technique, or device that significantly contributes in a general way to nuclear physics research.

The Bonner Prize is generally awarded for individual achievement in experimental research, but can be awarded for exceptional theoretical work and to groups who have contributed to a single accomplishment.

== Recipients ==
- 2026 Christopher L. Morris
- 2025 Volker Burkert
- 2024 Wit Busza
- 2023 Jen-Chieh Peng
- 2022 David W. Hertzog
- 2021 Geoffrey L. Greene
- 2020 Richard Milner
- 2019 Barbara Jacak
- 2018 Bradley Marc Sherrill
- 2017 Charles F. Perdrisat
- 2016 I-yang Lee
- 2015 Howard Wieman and Miklos Gyulassy
- 2014 William A. Zajc
- 2013 Michael K. Moe
- 2012 Witold Nazarewicz
- 2011 Richard F. Casten
- 2010 Steven C. Pieper and Robert B. Wiringa
- 2009 Robert D. McKeown
- 2008 Arthur M. Poskanzer
- 2007 Stuart J. Freedman
- 2006 Ian Towner and John Hardy
- 2005 Roy Holt
- 2004 George F. Bertsch
- 2003 Arthur Bruce McDonald
- 2002 J. David Bowman
- 2001 Richard Geller and Claude Lyneis
- 2000 Raymond G. Arnold
- 1999 Vijay Raghunath Pandharipande
- 1998 Joel M. Moss
- 1997 Hamish Robertson
- 1996 John Dirk Walecka
- 1995 Felix Boehm
- 1994 Ernest K. Warburton
- 1993 Akito Arima and Francesco Iachello
- 1992 Henry G. Blosser and Robert E. Pollock
- 1991 Peter J. Twin
- 1990 Vernon Hughes
- 1989 Ernest M. Henley
- 1988 Raymond Davis Jr.
- 1987 Bernard Frois and Ingo Sick
- 1986 Lowell M. Bollinger
- 1985 Eric G. Adelberger
- 1984 Harald A. Enge
- 1983 Charles D. Goodman
- 1982 Gerald E. Brown
- 1981 Bernard L. Cohen
- 1980 Frank S. Stephens and Richard M. Diamond
- 1979 Roy Middleton and Willy Haeberli
- 1978 Sergei Polikanov and V. M. Strutinsky
- 1977 Stuart T. Butler and G. Raymond Satchler
- 1976 John P. Schiffer
- 1975 Chien-Shiung Wu
- 1974 Denys Wilkinson
- 1973 Herman Feshbach
- 1972 John D. Anderson and Donald Robson
- 1971 Maurice Goldhaber
- 1970 William A. Fowler
- 1969 Gregory Breit
- 1968 Raymond G. Herb
- 1967 Charles Christian Lauritsen
- 1966 Robert J. Van de Graaff
- 1965 Henry H. Barschall

== See also ==
- List of physics awards
