= Bernard Frois =

French physicist (born 1943)

Bernard Frois (born January 21, 1943, in Toulouse, France) is a French nuclear physicist, energy policy advisor, and science manager.

== Education and career ==
Frois received his doctorate in physics from the University of Paris. From 1968 to 2005 he was employed at the Saclay Nuclear Research Centre as a Directeur de recherche (senior scientist) at the Centre national de la recherche scientifique (CNRS). From 2001 to 2005 he was also a Directeur du Département Energie, Transport, Environnement et Ressources naturelles (Director of the Energy, Transport, Environment and Natural Resources Department) in France's Ministère en charge de l'enseignement supérieur et de la recherche (Ministry in charge of higher education and research). From 2006 to 2010 Frois was a Directeur de Nouvelles Technologies de l'Energie (Director of New Technologies of Energy) of the Agence nationale de la recherche (ANR). From 2011 to the present he has been a scientific advisor for CEA-Liten.

He did considerable research on electron scattering on few-nucleon systems. From nuclear physics he later turned to energy policy and research on energy issues.

Frois was vice-president of the OECD Global Science Forum, chaired the Europe Union's Hydrogen Platform Mirror Group, and served on many international committees. He was a research associate at CERN from 1994 to 1995 and a visiting professor at the University of Utrecht from 1989 to 1990. He held an adjunct professorship at the University of Illinois at Urbana-Champaign from 1987 to 1997. He has served on the Science and Ethics Committee of the Sahara Wind Project.

He is on the governing boards of the Carbon Sequestration Leadership Forum (CSLF) and the International Partnership for Hydrogen Economy (IPHE), as well as the board of directors of the European Union's Fuel Cells and Hydrogen Joint Undertaking and its successor the Clean Hydrogen Joint Undertaking.

In 1981 Frois was elected a Fellow of the American Physical Society. In 1987 he was awarded, jointly with Ingo Sick, the Tom W. Bonner Prize in Nuclear Physics from the American Physical Society:

"For their elegant studies of nuclei using high-energy electron scattering. In particular, their precision measurements of nuclear charge and current densities have offered novel perspectives on ground states and valence orbitals. Their studies of few-nucleon systems have demonstrated the need for sub-nucleon degrees of freedom in a complete description of the nucleus. This body of work has provided firm benchmarks against which to test our understanding of the nuclear many-body problems."

In 1994 he received the médaille d'argent (silver medal) of the CNRS. In 2002 he was appointed Chevalier de l'Ordre du Mérite by the Ministère de la Recherche.

== Selected publications ==
- as editor with Ingo Sick: Modern topics in Electron Scattering, World Scientific 1991 ISBN 978-9971509750
- as editor with Vernon Hughes, N. de Groot; Spin structure of the Nucleon: International School of Nucleon Structure, Erice Lectures 1995, World Scientific 1997 ISBN 981-02-3323-X
- as editor with J.-F. Mathiot: Hadronic Physics with Electrons Beyond 10 GeV: Proceedings of the Second European Workshop on Hadronic Physics with Electrons Beyond 10 GeV, Dourdan, France, October 7–12, 1990, North Holland 1991
- as editor with Marie-Anne Bouchiat: Parity Violation in Atoms and in Polarized Electron Scattering: Ens, Paris, France 21-31 October 1997, World Scientific 1999 ISBN 9810237316
