= Howard Wieman =

American experimental physicist (born 1942)

Howard Henry Wieman
- Born: 1942 (age 83–84); Oregon, USA
- Education: Oregon State University; University of Washington
- Known for: STAR detector, Time Projection Chamber, Active-pixel sensor
- Family: Carl Wieman + 3 more siblings; Henry Nelson Wieman
- Awards: Tom W. Bonner Prize in Nuclear Physics (2015); Fellow of the American Physical Society (2001); LBNL J.M. Nitschke Technical Excellence Award (1999)
- Scientific career
- Fields: Physics, Nuclear Physics
- Workplaces: Lawrence Berkeley National Laboratory (LBNL); Helmholtz Centre for Heavy Ion Research (GSI); University of Colorado
- Doctoral advisor: Isaac Halpern

Howard Henry Wieman is an experimental nuclear physicist specializing in instrumentation and detectors for high-energy nuclear physics.

In 2015, Wieman (LBNL) and Miklos Gyulassy (Columbia) were awarded the APS Tom W. Bonner Prize in Nuclear Physics.

Wieman is best known for leading the team that designed the STAR Time Projection Chamber (TPC) which was used to discover a new state of matter, the strongly interacting Quark-gluon plasma. The discovery was made at the Relativistic Heavy Ion Collider (RHIC) at Brookhaven National Laboratory. The STAR TPC was built in Berkeley, installed at RHIC, and tested throughout 1998 and 1999. The first Gold-Gold collisions at RHIC were recorded by STAR with the TPC starting on June 12, 2000 and the data were published in January 2001. The Run 0 data showed significant elliptic flow in heavy ion collisions and indicated that the collision zone at RHIC energies is behaving hydrodynamically and with significant thermalization. This was a key step in making the discovery of a strongly interacting Quark Gluon Plasma and a perfect liquid which was announced simultaneously in 2005 by STAR, BRAHMS, PHOBOS,, and PHENIX.

The STAR experiment took its last event on February 6, 2026 making it one of the longest duration collider accelerator experiments ever undertaken.

== Education and career ==
Wieman received his bachelor's degree from Oregon State University in 1966 and his doctorate in 1975 from the University of Washington. His doctoral advisor was Isaac Halpern. He was a post-doctoral fellow at the University of Colorado and then spent the bulk of his career as a Senior Scientist at the Lawrence Berkeley National Laboratory. At times, he also worked for and in collaboration with the Gesellschaft für Schwerionenforschung (GSI, Darmstadt). He retired from LBNL in 2011 but continued to consult on STAR projects until the TPC took its last event in 2026.

At LBNL he was responsible for the design and installation of the Low Energy Beam Line at the Bevalac heavy ion accelerator and for the development of two generations of large Time Projection Chambers (TPCs). His first TPC was the EOS Time Projection Chamber at the Bevalac, which he co-led with Hans-Georg Ritter. Wieman then led the design and construction of a larger TPC for the STAR detector at the Relativistic Heavy Ion Collider (RHIC) at Brookhaven National Laboratory. He finished his career working with thin, high resolution, active pixel sensors. In particular, the Heavy Flavor Tracker (HFT) pixel detector for the STAR experiment was a ground-breaking device It became operational in 2014 and was used to observe D mesons produced in heavy ion collisions.

Wieman is a Fellow of the American Physical Society, was awarded the LBNL J.M. Nitschke Technical Excellence Award in 1999, and received the APS Tom W. Bonner Prize for Nuclear Physics in 2015.
