= Bradley Marc Sherrill =

Professor of Physics at Michigan State University

Bradley Marc Sherrill (born June 15, 1958) is a Distinguished Professor of Physics at Michigan State University.

== Education and career ==
Sherrill obtained his B.A. from Coe College in 1980 and following it earned his M.S. and Ph.D. from Michigan State University in 1982 and 1985, respectively. After graduation, he joined the National Superconducting Cyclotron Laboratory and in 1991 became assistant professor of physics at MSU. He is a director of the NSCL and scientific director at the Facility for Rare Isotope Beams.

== Awards and recognitions ==
Since 2011, Sherrill is a Fellow of the American Association for the Advancement of Science. In 2018, he was awarded the status of Fellow in the American Physical Society, after he was nominated by their Division of Nuclear Physics in 1998, for his contributions to the field of radioactive beams, especially for development of innovative ion-optical techniques, and for their use in the measurement of breakup momentum distributions and obtaining their relation to the momentum wavefunctions of weakly bound nuclei. The same year, he also was awarded with the Tom W. Bonner Prize in Nuclear Physics.
