= Richard Geller (physicist) =

Experimental nuclear and plasma physicist

- Born: 25 April 1927
- Died: 1 July 2007 (aged 80)
- Occupation(s): Experimental nuclear and plasma physicist

Richard Geller (25 April 1927 – 1 July 2007) was an experimental nuclear and plasma physicist. He was born on 25 April 1927 in Vienna and died on 1 July 2007 at the age of 80, in Grenoble.

Geller received his undergraduate degree from the Conservatoire National des Arts et Métiers, Paris and his Doctorat en Sciences, under Prof. F. Perrin from the Sorbonne (1954). He was hired in 1948 by F. Joliot Curie to work at Commissariat à l'énergie atomique (CEA; Atomic Energy Commission) and remained there until leaving in 1992, with the exception of a sabbatical at Stanford University (1961–1962), where, as a research associate, he developed the first bumpy torus plasma.

In the 1960s he developed electron cyclotron resonance heating of plasma physics as part of controlled fusion. In the 1970s and 1980s his group developed the Electron Cyclotron Resonance Ion Source, ECRIS, for use in accelerators on for particle physics, nuclear physics, and medical applications.

In 1992 he went to the Institut des Sciences Nucléaires de Grenoble, where he developed a new electron cyclotron resonance (ECR) method that was used to generate radioactive ion beams in nuclear physics.

In 1983 he received the "Prix Gegner of the Académie des Sciences, Paris," in 1987 the "Prix du CEA," and in 2001 the American Physical Society's Tom W. Bonner Prize in Nuclear Physics, shared with Claude Lyneis.

A prize awarded by Pantechnik (a manufacturer of ECR sources) is named after him and is delivered every 2 year at the ECRIS international conference.

He authored a book Electron Cyclotron Resonance Ion Sources and ECR Plasmas.
