= Jen-Chieh Peng =

Experimental nuclear physicist

- 彭仁傑
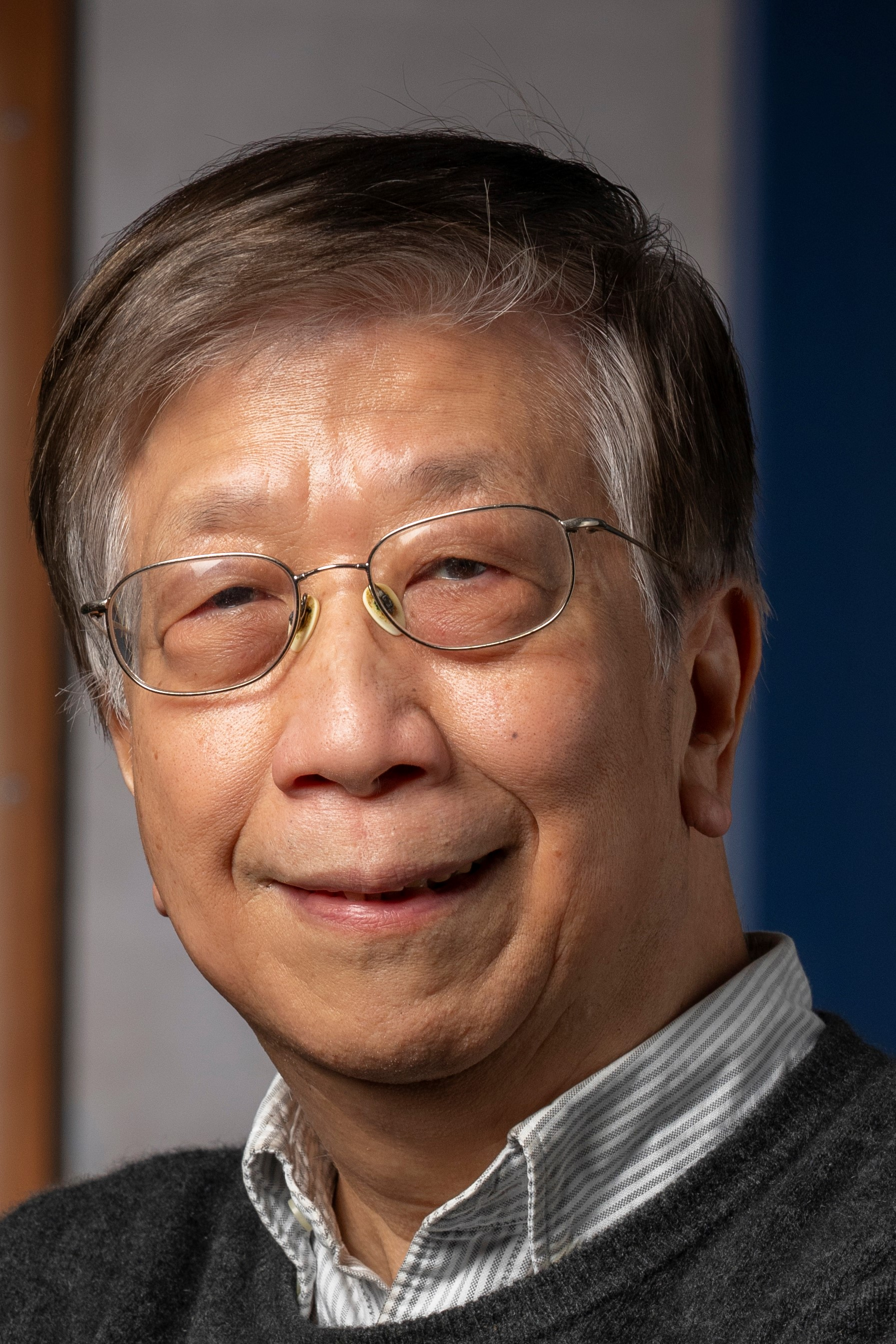
- Born: 1949 (age 76–77)
- Education: Tunghai University (BS); University of Pittsburgh (PhD)
- Awards: APS Fellow (1993); LANL Fellow (1997); Breakthrough Prize (2016); Tom W. Bonner Prize (2023)
- Scientific career
- Fields: Nuclear physics
- Workplaces: University of Illinois Urbana–Champaign; Academia Sinica
- Thesis: (16O, 12C) Reaction and 24Mg and 28Si (1975)
- Doctoral advisor: James V. Maher
- Website: https://physics.illinois.edu/people/directory/profile/jcpeng

Jen-Chieh Peng (Chinese: 彭仁傑; born 1949) is a Taiwanese-American experimental nuclear physicist at the University of Illinois Urbana–Champaign.

== Education and career ==
Peng earned his bachelor's degree in physics from Tunghai University in Taiwan in 1970 and his Ph.D. in nuclear physics from the University of Pittsburgh in 1975. He worked as a researcher at the Centre d'Études Nucléaires de Saclay in France before joining the Physics Division of Los Alamos National Laboratory in 1978. Peng joined the faculty at Illinois Physics in 2002 as a full professor.

Peng's areas of research include partonic structures of hadrons, fundamental symmetries, and neutrino physics. He is a spokesperson or co-spokesperson of some 10 nuclear and particle physics experiments and a coauthor of over 430 journal articles, cited more than 50,000 times.

Peng was elected a Fellow of the American Physical Society in 1993 and a Laboratory Fellow at the Los Alamos National Laboratory in 1997. In 2022 he was elected an Academician of the Academia Sinica. In 2022 he received the Tom W. Bonner Prize in Nuclear Physics with the citation "for pioneering work on studying antiquark distributions in the nucleons and nuclei using the Drell-Yan process as an experimental tool, and for seminal work on elucidating the origins of the flavor asymmetries of light-quark sea in the nucleons".

== Awards and honors ==
- Fellow of the American Physical Society. 1993
- Fellow of Los Alamos National Laboratory. 1997
- Breakthrough Prize in Fundamental Physics. 2016
- Distinguished Alumni of Tunghai University. 2020
- Yu-Shan Scholar. 2022
- Academician of Academia Sinica, Taiwan. 2022
- Tom W. Bonner Prize. 2022
