= G. Raymond Satchler =

British physicist

George Raymond "Ray" Satchler (14 June 1926, London, UK – 28 March 2010, Shelton, Washington, U.S.) was a British-American nuclear physicist.

== Biography ==
After serving from 1944 to 1948 the Royal Air Force, Satchler studied at the University of Oxford, where he graduated in 1951 with a B.A. and an M.A. and in 1955 with a doctorate in physics. His thesis advisor was John Ashley Spiers. As a postdoc Satchler was from 1956 to 1957 a research associate at the University of Michigan and from 1956 to 1959 a research fellow at Imperial Chemical Industries. He was a physicist at Oak Ridge National Laboratory, from 1959 to 1996, when he retired. From 1994 to 2005 he was a professor at the University of Tennessee. He was the author or co-author of over 275 papers.

Satchler was elected a Fellow of the American Physical Society (APS) in 1961. In 1976 he was named a Corporate Fellow of Oak Ridge National Laboratory, which at that time was operated by the Union Carbide Corporation under a contract with the U.S. federal government. In 1977 he received, jointly with Stuart Thomas Butler, the Tom W. Bonner Prize in Nuclear Physics for "their discovery that direct nuclear reactions can be used to determine angular momenta of discreet nuclear states and for their systematic exploitation of this discovery permitting the determination of spins, parities and quantitative properties of nuclear wave functions."

In Yorkshire in 1948 Satchler married Margaret Patricia "Pat" Enid Gibson. Upon his death he was survived by two daughters and a grandson.

== Selected publications ==
=== Articles ===
- Satchler, G.R. (1958). "Time reversal and polarized nuclear reactions". Nuclear Physics. 8: 65–68. Bibcode:1958NucPh...8...65S. doi:10.1016/0029-5582(58)90131-7.
- Satchler, G.R. (1964). "The distorted-waves theory of direct nuclear reactions with spin-orbit effects". Nuclear Physics. 55: 1–33. Bibcode:1964NucPh..55....1S. doi:10.1016/0029-5582(64)90124-5.
- McFadden, Lynne; Satchler, G.R. (1966). "Optical-model analysis of the scattering of 24.7 MeV alpha particles". Nuclear Physics. 84 (1): 177–200. Bibcode:1966NucPh..84..177M. doi:10.1016/0029-5582(66)90441-X.
- Satchler, G. Ray (1978). "Outline of the development of the theory of direct nuclear reactions". Reviews of Modern Physics. 50: 1–10. doi:10.1103/RevModPhys.50.1.
- Satchler, G.R.; Love, W.G. (1979). "Folding model potentials from realistic interactions for heavy-ion scattering". Physics Reports. 55 (3): 183–254. Bibcode:1979PhR....55..183S. doi:10.1016/0370-1573(79)90081-4.
- Vaz, Louis C.; Alexander, John M.; Satchler, G.R. (1981). "Fusion barriers, empirical and theoretical: Evidence for dynamic deformation in subbarrier fusion". Physics Reports. 69 (5): 373–399. Bibcode:1981PhR....69..373V. doi:10.1016/0370-1573(81)90094-6.
- Mahaux, C.; Ngô, H.; Satchler, G.R. (1986). "Causality and the threshold anomaly of the nucleus-nucleus potential". Nuclear Physics A. 449 (2): 354–394. Bibcode:1986NuPhA.449..354M. doi:10.1016/0375-9474(86)90009-6.
- Rowley, N.; Satchler, G.R.; Stelson, P.H. (1991). "On the "distribution of barriers" interpretation of heavy-ion fusion". Physics Letters B. 254 (1–2): 25–29. Bibcode:1991PhLB..254...25R. doi:10.1016/0370-2693(91)90389-8.
- Brandan, M.E.; Satchler, G.R. (1997). "The interaction between light heavy-ions and what it tells us". Physics Reports. 285 (4–5): 143–243. Bibcode:1997PhR...285..143B. doi:10.1016/S0370-1573(96)00048-8.

=== Books ===
- with David M. Brink: Angular momentum 1962. 2nd edition 1971. 3rd edition. Clarendon Press, Oxford 1993, ISBN 0-19-851759-9
- Introduction to nuclear reactions 1980. 2nd edition Oxford University Press, Oxford 1990, ISBN 0-333-51484-X.
- Direct nuclear reactions. Oxford University Press, Oxford 1983, ISBN 0-19-851269-4.
