= David M. Brink =

Australian-British nuclear physicist (1930–2021)

David Maurice Brink FRS (20 July 1930, Hobart, Tasmania, Australia – 8 March 2021, Oxford, UK) was an Australian-British nuclear physicist. He is known for the Axel-Brink hypothesis.

== Education and career ==
Brink matriculated in 1947 at the University of Tasmania, where he graduated with a B.Sc. in physics in 1951. As a Rhodes Scholar, he became a graduate student in physics at Magdalen College, Oxford, where he received his PhD in 1955. His doctoral dissertation Some aspects of the interactions of light with matter was supervised by Maurice Pryce. From 1954 to 1958, Brink was a Rutherford Scholar of the Royal Society. For the academic year 1957–1958 he was an instructor at the Massachusetts Institute of Technology (MIT). From 1958 to 1993, he was a Fellow of Balliol College, Oxford. At the University of Oxford, he was from 1958 to 1988, a university lecturer and from 1988 to 1993 a Moseley Reader. In 1993 he moved to Trento, Italy. There from 1993 to 1998, he was the vice-director of the European Centre for Theoretical Studies in Nuclear Physics (under the auspices of the European Centre of Technology), as well as, at the University of Trento a professor of the history of physics.

Brink was a visiting scientist at Copenhagen's Niels Bohr Institute in 1964. He has been a visiting professor at the Institut de physique nucléaire d'Orsay (1969 and 1981–1982), the University of British Columbia (1975), the Technical University of Munich (1982), the University of Trento (1988), the University of Catania (1988), and Michigan State University (1988–1989).

As a theoretical physicist he did important research on "the study of nuclear structure via the shell model and effective interactions, and nuclear reactions via statistical methods."

He was interested in the physics of giant resonances and developed semi classical methods for heavy ion reactions which he used to explain the selectivity in the population of high angular momentum states in heavy ion transfer reactions and neutron transfer to bound states. His book Angular momentum (with G.R. Satchler) is a classic introduction to the topic.
For several years David had a very productive collaboration with Dominique Vautherin, Marcel Vénéroni and their colleagues at Orsay on the use of Skyrme's effective interaction for Hartree-Fock calculations and, later, on the semi classical theory of collective motion in nuclei.

He was elected in 1981 a Fellow of the Royal Society. He received in 1982 the Rutherford Medal of the Institute of Physics. He was made in 1992 a Foreign Member of the Royal Society of Sciences in Uppsala. In 2006 he received the Lise Meitner Prize "for his many contributions to the theory of nuclear structure and nuclear reactions over several decades, including his seminal work on the theory of nuclear masses using Skyrme effective interactions, nuclear giant resonances, clustering in nuclei and quantum and semi-classical theories of heavy-ion scattering and reactions."

== Selected publications ==
=== Articles ===
- Bloch, Claude, ed. (1966). "The alpha-particle model of light nuclei by D. M. Brink". Many-body description of nuclear structure and reactions: proceedings of the International School of Physics "Enrico Fermi": course XXXVI: Varenna on Lake Como, Villa Monastero, 26th July–14th August, 1965. Academic Press. pp. 247–276.
- Brink, D. M.; Boeker, E. (1967). "Effective interactions for Hartree-Fock calculations". Nuclear Physics A. 91 (1): 1–26. Bibcode:1967NuPhA..91....1B. doi:10.1016/0375-9474(67)90446-0. (over 650 citations)
  - Jones, H. J.; Brink, D. M. (1967). "Angular distribution of gamma rays in terms of phase-defined reduced matrix elements". Reviews of Modern Physics. 39 (2): 306–347. Bibcode:1967RvMP...39..306R. doi:10.1103/RevModPhys.39.306. (over 950 citations)
- Brink, D. M.; Weiguny, A. (1968). "The generator coordinate theory of collective motion". Nuclear Physics A. 120 (1): 59–93. Bibcode:1968NuPhA.120...59B. doi:10.1016/0375-9474(68)90059-6.
- Vautherin, D.; Vénéroni, M.; Brink, D.M. (1970). "A Hartree-Fock calculation for the stability of super-heavy nuclei". Physics Letters B. 33 (6): 381–384. Bibcode:1970PhLB...33..381V. doi:10.1016/0370-2693(70)90609-X.
- Vautherin, D.; Brink, D. M. (1972). "Hartree-Fock Calculations with Skyrme's Interaction. I. Spherical Nuclei". Physical Review C. 5 (3): 626–647. Bibcode:1972PhRvC...5..626V. doi:10.1103/PhysRevC.5.626. (over 3050 citations)
- Engel, Y.M.; Brink, D.M.; Goeke, K.; Krieger, S.J.; Vautherin, D. (1975). "Time-dependent hartree-fock theory with Skyrme's interaction". Nuclear Physics A. 249 (2): 215–238. Bibcode:1975NuPhA.249..215E. doi:10.1016/0375-9474(75)90184-0.
- Brink, D. M. (1994). "Collective motion in excited nuclei". Nuclear Physics A. 574 (1–2): 207–215. Bibcode:1994NuPhA.574..207B. doi:10.1016/0375-9474(94)90046-9.
- Brown, Laurie M.; Pais, Abraham; Pippard, Brian, eds. (1995). "Chapter 15. Nuclear Dynamics by David M. Brink". Twentieth Century Physics. Vol. 2. CRC Press. ISBN 9781420050776.

=== Books ===
- with George Raymond Satchler: Angular Momentum 1962. 2nd edition 1971. 3rd edition. Clarendon Press, Oxford 1993, ISBN 0-19-851759-9
- Nuclear Forces, Pergamon Press 1965 ISBN 978-0080110349
  - German translation: Kernkräfte, WTB Texte, 1971
- Semi-classical methods in nucleus-nucleus scattering, Cambridge University Press 1985; 2009 edition ISBN 978-0521114387
- as editor with Feodor Karpechine, F. Bary Malik, João Da Providência: Fission Dynamics Of Atomic Clusters And Nuclei - Proceedings Of The International Workshop. World Scientific. 2001. ISBN 978-9814490573.
- with Ricardo A. Broglia: Nuclear superfluidity: pairing in finite systems, Cambridge University Press 2005; e-book ISBN 978-0-511-11196-9; hbk ISBN 978-0-521-39540-3
