= Volker Burkert =

German-American physicist

Volker D. Burkert
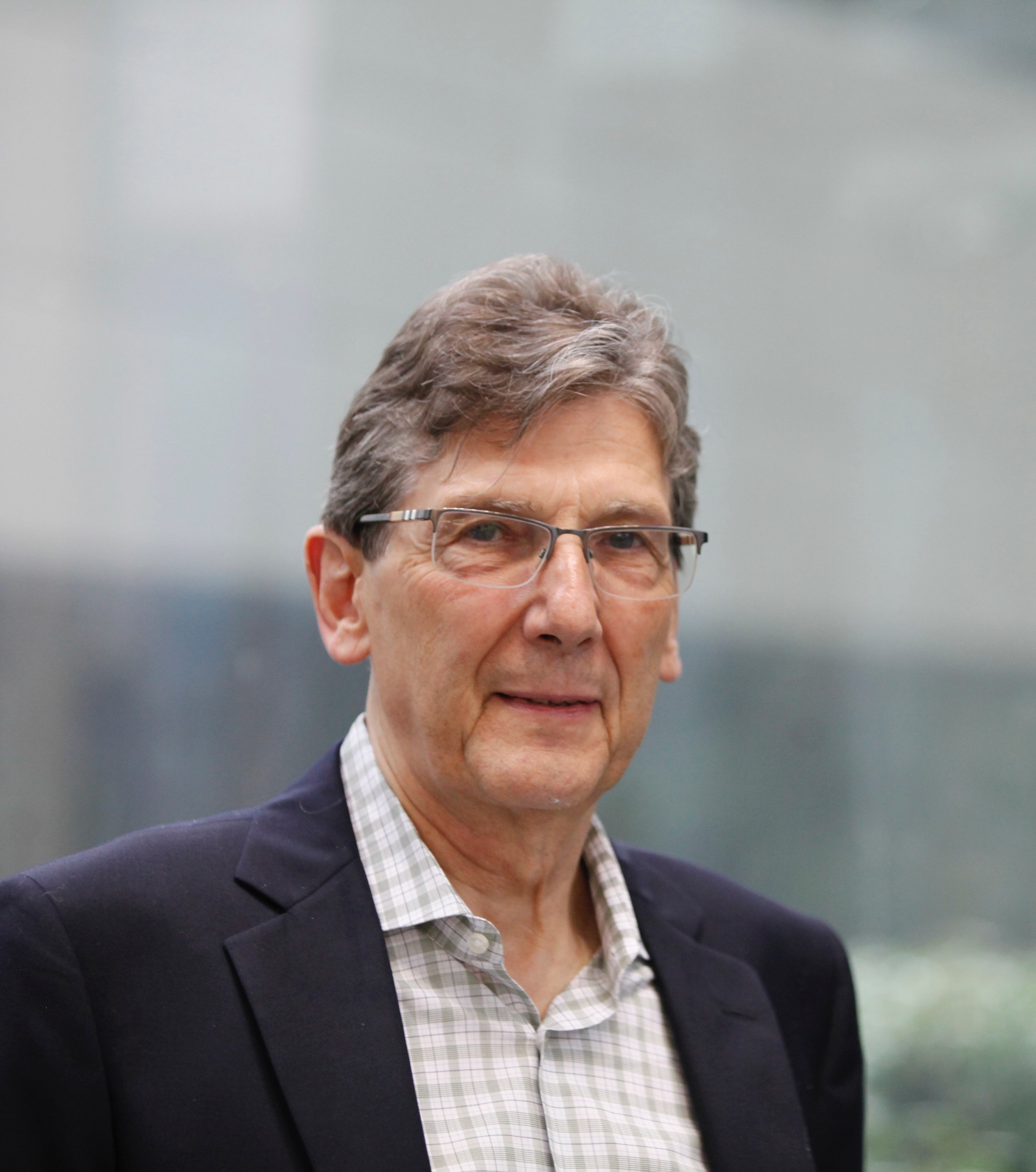
- Occupations: Physicist, academic and researcher
- Awards: Bonner Prize, American Physical Society, Outstanding Scientist Award, Governor of Virginia, USA; Fellow, American Physical Society

Academic background
- Education: B.A. M.S. Physics; PhD Philosophy
- Alma mater: Bonn University

Academic work
- Institutions: Thomas Jefferson National Accelerator Facility (Jefferson Lab/JLab)

Volker D. Burkert is a German physicist, academic and researcher. He is a Principal Staff Scientist at the Thomas Jefferson National Accelerator Facility, also known as Jefferson Lab in Newport News, Virginia, United States.

His work has focused on studies of nucleon structure and on the development of CLAS and CLAS12, large-acceptance spectrometers used in electron-scattering experiments. In 2018, Burkert co-authored "The pressure distribution inside the proton", a study published in Nature, which described the first measurement of a mechanical property of a subatomic particle.

Burkert is a Fellow of the American Physical Society and the recipient of the 2019 Virginia Governor's Outstanding Scientist Award. In 2025, he received the Tom W. Bonner Prize in Nuclear Physics from the American Physical Society.

== Education ==
Burkert was educated at the University of Bonn in Germany, earning a BA in 1967, a master's degree in physics in 1969 and a PhD in 1975.

== Career ==
Burkert began his career as a research associate at Bonn University in 1975. In 1978, he was promoted to the German equivalent of an assistant professorship, a position that he held until 1984. During this time he was also on leave as a Scientific Associate at the European Council for Nuclear Research (CERN) in Switzerland, where he joined the Axial Field Spectrometer (AFS) team at the proton-proton Intersecting Storage Rings (ISR). Following a sabbatical in the US in 1984, he joined the Continuous Electron Beam Accelerator Facility (CEBAF) in 1985 as a staff scientist.

At CEBAF, which later became known as Jefferson Lab, he was involved with the development, construction and operation of the CEBAF Large Acceptance Spectrometer (CLAS). In 1992, Burkert was promoted to senior staff scientist and developed a research program on the internal structure of nucleons, including studies of their excited states.

In 2003, he was appointed group leader of Jefferson Lab's Experimental Hall B, where he led a team of scientists working with the CLAS detector system to study the internal quark and gluon structure of protons, neutrons and atomic nuclei. During his time at Hall B, he developed the conceptual design for CLAS12, a large-acceptance spectrometer system built for experiments following the 12 GeV CEBAF upgrade. CLAS12 began operation in 2018.

In 2019, Burkert stepped down as Hall B leader and became a principal staff scientist in Jefferson Lab’s Experimental Nuclear Physics division. Since 2020, Burkert has been part of Jefferson Lab's team for the Electron-Ion Collider science program.

== Research ==
Burkert has authored or co-authored over 460 scientific articles and has over 51,000 citations. His research has focused on the internal structure of protons, neutrons and nuclei, including nucleon excitations, electron-scattering measurements, and the development and use of large-acceptance detector systems.

=== Early research ===
His early research focused on nucleon excitations using high-energy polarized electron beams and spin-polarized hydrogen and deuterium targets. At the Bonn University electron accelerator, Burkert developed an electron-spin polarimeter to measure the energy and strength of depolarizing resonances induced in the electron beam during synchrotron acceleration. The results enabled compensating measures that maintained high polarization during acceleration, as required for polarized-beam experiments.

Burkert's research at CERN focused on hard scattering processes using two colliding proton beams, each with beam energies up to 31 GeV. This led to the first direct determination of the gluon structure function of the proton.

=== CLAS and CLAS12 ===
At Jefferson Lab, Burkert led a research program on the structure of protons, neutrons and nuclei using high-energy electron and photon beams and polarized hydrogen and deuterium targets. He contributed to the design, construction and performance of the CEBAF Large Acceptance Spectrometer (CLAS). CLAS had been instrumented for high-rate operation with intense electron beams and was used to detect and identify particles produced in these interactions. This enabled exclusive electron-scattering measurements in which particles generated in the interaction were detected and identified. Detector modifications to CLAS enabled the observation of the theoretically predicted Deeply Virtual Compton scattering (DVCS) process. DVCS measurements provided an experimental basis for studies of generalized parton distributions, which are used to investigate the three-dimensional quark structure and mechanical properties of the proton. These detector modifications were also used in measurements of excited proton states as part of the NSTAR program.

Burkert oversaw the design, construction and commissioning of the CLAS12 spectrometer system and ancillary equipment. Built for experiments following the 12 GeV CEBAF upgrade, CLAS12 was designed for an order-of-magnitude increase in operating luminosity and higher event-rate capability compared with the original CLAS detector.

=== Mechanical properties of the proton ===
In 2018, Burkert, Latifa Elouadrhiri and François-Xavier Girod published a Nature paper on the pressure distribution inside the proton. The study was the first measurement of a mechanical property of a subatomic particle. It found strong repulsive pressure near the center of the proton and binding pressure at greater distances. The paper also contributed to research on the gravitational and mechanical properties of protons, neutrons and nuclei, including pressure distributions, shear forces and physical radii. Using extracted Compton form factors, the research produced tomographic information about the nucleon. These results were based on measurements of differential cross sections and beam-spin asymmetries in hard exclusive photon electroproduction on the proton over a wide kinematic range and with high statistical precision.

In 2023, Burkert co-authored a Reviews of Modern Physics colloquium on gravitational form factors of the proton, reviewing theoretical and experimental progress in interpreting these form factors in terms of the proton's mechanical properties.

=== Nucleon resonances and exotic baryons ===
Burkert reviewed experimental claims from 2003 and 2004 concerning possible pentaquark states, including the proposed exotic baryon Θ+(1540). A pentaquark state would consist of four quarks and one antiquark, unlike ordinary baryons, which are composed of three quarks. In his review, Burkert discussed evidence from photoproduction experiments, including measurements on deuterium targets, as well as searches for heavier pentaquark candidates. He concluded that later precision data had significantly weakened the evidence for the Θ+ state, leaving only the possibility of a very narrow hypothetical baryon state in the K+n system.

Burkert has also worked on the electroexcitation of nucleon resonances, including studies of transition amplitudes in excited nucleon states. In a 2012 review with Inna Aznauryan, he discussed experimental and theoretical progress on the electroexcitation amplitudes of the four lowest excited states. The review found that a simple three-valence-quark model could not fully explain the resonance transition amplitudes at low photon virtuality, requiring additional contributions such as meson-baryon components. This work contributed to later discussions of the Roper resonance, the lowest-mass radial excitation of the nucleon. Burkert later co-authored a review of the Roper resonance in Reviews of Modern Physics. Similar, though smaller, effects were also reported for other excited states, including Δ(1232)3/2+, N(1520)3/2−, and N(1535)1/2−.

== Awards and honors ==
- 2004 - Fellow, American Physical Society – Division Nuclear Physics
- 2013 - Member, Particle Data Group (PDG), Section Unstable Baryons
- 2019 - Outstanding Scientist Award, Governor of Virginia
- 2021 - Outstanding Achievements in Nuclear and Particle Physics, MARQUIS Who's Who,
- 2025 - Tom W. Bonner Prize in Nuclear Physics, American Physical Society Division of Nuclear Physics, for work on large-acceptance spectrometers.

== Selected publications ==
- N* Physics and Nonperturbative Quantum Chromodynamics, S. Simula, B. Saghai, V. D. Burkert and N. C. Mukhopadhyay, eds. Springer, 1999. ISBN 978-3-211-83299-8.
- Excited Nucleons and Hadronic Structure, Proceedings of the NSTAR 2000 Conference, 16–19 February 2000, Newport News, Virginia, V. D. Burkert, L. Elouadrhiri, J. J. Kelly and R. C. Minehart, eds. World Scientific, 2000.
- "Observation of Exclusive Deeply Virtual Compton Scattering in Polarized Electron Beam Asymmetry Measurements". Physical Review Letters, 87(18), 182002 (2001).
- "The CEBAF large acceptance spectrometer (CLAS)". Nuclear Instruments and Methods in Physics Research Section A: Accelerators, Spectrometers, Detectors and Associated Equipment, 503(3), 513–553 (2003).
- "Have Pentaquark States Been Seen?" International Journal of Modern Physics A, 21(8n09), 1764–1777 (2006).
- Electromagnetic Interactions and Hadronic Structure, F. Close, S. Donnachie and G. Shaw, eds. Cambridge University Press, 2007. ISBN 978-0-521-84420-8. doi:10.1017/CBO9780511534928.
- The 8th International Workshop on the Physics of Excited Nucleons, Newport News, Virginia, 17–20 May 2011, V. D. Burkert, M. Jones, M. Pennington and D. Richards, eds. AIP Conference Proceedings, 2012.
- 12th International Conference on Meson-Nucleon Physics and the Structure of the Nucleon, D. Armstrong, V. Burkert, W. Detmold, J. Dudek, J. P. Chen, W. Melnitchouk and D. Richards, eds. AIP Conference Proceedings, 2011. ISBN 9780735409347.
- "Electroexcitation of nucleon resonances". Progress in Particle and Nuclear Physics, 67(1), 1–54 (2012).
- "Review of Particle Physics". Physical Review D, 98(3), 030001 (2018).
- "The pressure distribution inside the proton". Nature, 557(7705), 396–399 (2018).
- "Roper resonance: Toward a solution to the fifty year puzzle". Reviews of Modern Physics, 91(1), 011003 (2019).
- "Review of Particle Physics". Progress of Theoretical and Experimental Physics, 2020(8), 083C01 (2020).
- "The CLAS12 spectrometer at Jefferson Laboratory". Nuclear Instruments and Methods in Physics Research Section A: Accelerators, Spectrometers, Detectors and Associated Equipment, 959, 163419 (2020).
- "Colloquium: Gravitational form factors of the proton". Reviews of Modern Physics, 95(4), 041002 (2023).
