= Ernest K. Warburton (physicist) =

Ernest K. Warburton (26 April 1928 in Worcester, Massachusetts – 9 May 1994 in Port Jefferson, New York) was an American experimental nuclear physicist.

Warburton received a Bachelor of Arts degree from Miami University in 1949, and a Bachelor of Science degree from the Massachusetts Institute of Technology in 1951. In 1957 he earned a Ph.D. in physics at the University of Pittsburgh. After being an instructor and assistance professor at Princeton University starting in 1958, he joined Brookhaven National Laboratory in 1961 and became Senior Physicist in 1968. As a Fellow of the National Science Foundation, he spent 1963-64 and 1968-69 at Oxford University.

Ernest Warburton was awarded the 1994 Tom W. Bonner Prize in Nuclear Physics by the American Physical Society for his achievements quoted in the award citation:

For pioneering contributions to our understanding of the structure of light nuclei via the development and exploitation of experimental techniques in nuclear spectroscopy combined with theoretical analyses. In particular, his development of the gamma-gamma directional correlations measurements for extracting multipolarity information for inbeam gamma-ray spectroscopy, his pioneering measurements of nuclear lifetimes with Doppler shift methods, his development of methods of deducing multipolarities from the correlation of pairs in internal conversion, and his experimental and theoretical studies of first forbidden beta decay which show strong evidence for mesonic contributions to the weak axial current.

== See also ==
- Gamma spectroscopy
- Doppler effect
- Beta decay
