= Bjørn Trumpy =

Norwegian physicist

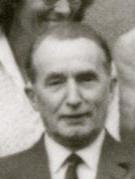
Trumpy 1963 in Copenhagen

Bjørn Trumpy (6 July 1900 – 8 June 1974) was a Norwegian physicist. He was born in Bergen. His research areas covered spectral physics, earth magnetism, cosmic radiation and nuclear physics. Trumpy was the first rector at the University of Bergen, from its establishment in 1948. He was decorated Commander of the Order of St. Olav in 1951.

He received his doctorate in 1927 from the Norwegian Institute of Technology. As a postdoc he studied in 1928 at the University of Göttingen under the supervision of Max Born and in 1929 at the University of Copenhagen under the supervision of Niels Bohr. Trumpy's doctoral students include Harald A. Enge.

Academic offices
Preceded by	Rector of the University of Bergen; 1948–1954	Succeeded by Erik Waaler
