= Gary Westfall =

American experimental nuclear and high-energy physicist

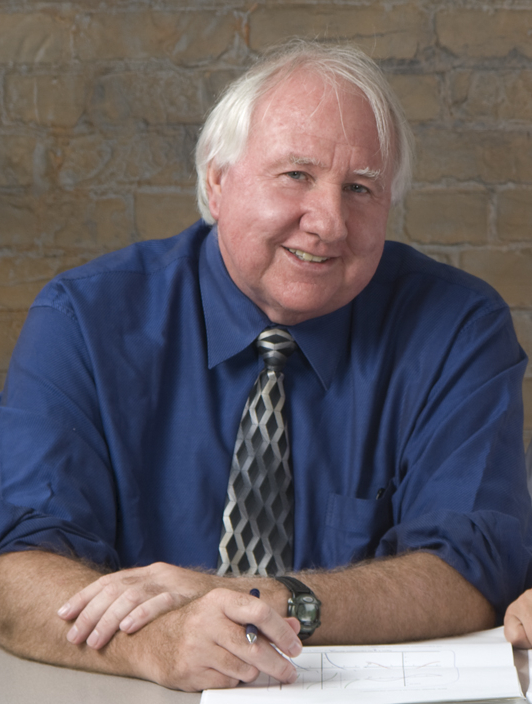
- Born: June 10, 1950 (age 76); Arlington, Texas
- Education: University of Texas at Austin
- Known for: Relativistic heavy ion collisions, disappearance of flow, balance energy, fireball model
- Awards: Humboldt Prize; Fellow of the American Physical Society
- Scientific career
- Fields: Physics, Nuclear Physics
- Workplaces: Lawrence Berkeley National Laboratory; National Superconducting Cyclotron Laboratory; Michigan State University
- Doctoral advisor: Amir Zaidi
- Notable students: Barbara Jacak

Gary D. Westfall (born June 10, 1950) is an American experimental nuclear and high energy physicist and University Distinguished Professor at Michigan State University. He is also a co-author, with Wolfgang Bauer, of the introductory calculus-based physics textbook University Physics, published by McGraw-Hill in 2010.

== Nuclear Physics Career ==
Gary D. Westfall started his career at the Center for Nuclear Studies at the University of Texas at Austin, where he completed his Ph.D. in experimental nuclear physics in 1975.

=== Lawrence Berkeley National Laboratory ===
After his Ph.D. Westfall went to Lawrence Berkeley National Laboratory (LBNL) in Berkeley, California, to conduct his post-doctoral work in high-energy nuclear physics and in 1977 stayed on as a staff scientist. While he was at LBNL, Westfall became internationally known for his work on the nuclear fireball model and the use of fragmentation to produce nuclei far from stability.

=== National Superconducting Cyclotron Laboratory ===
In 1981, Westfall joined the National Superconducting Cyclotron Laboratory (NSCL) at Michigan State University (MSU) as a research professor; there he conceived, constructed, and ran the MSU 4π Detector. His research using the 4π Detector produced information concerning the response of nuclear matter as it is compressed in a supernova collapse. In 1987, Westfall joined the Department of Physics and Astronomy at MSU as an associate professor, while continuing to carry out his research at NSCL. Since 1991 he has been serving as co-principal investigator on the NSCL cover grant from the U.S. National Science Foundation, which supports the operation of the NSCL. He was promoted to full professor in 1991, and in 2003 he was named university distinguished professor.

=== STAR Collaboration ===
In 1994, Westfall joined the STAR collaboration, which is carrying out experiments at the Relativistic Heavy Ion Collider (RHIC) at Brookhaven National Laboratory on Long Island, New York. He is Michigan State University's STAR Council representative, and since 2009 he has been serving as chair of the STAR Council. He was chair of the RHIC User Executive Committee from 2003 to 2005. At American Physical Society meeting in Tampa, Florida, in April 2005 he represented the entire RHIC community in announcing the discovery of the strongly coupled quark-gluon plasma (termed "perfect liquid" because of its vanishingly small viscosity).

== LON-CAPA and Textbook ==
Westfall has taught university physics and astronomy classes on the undergraduate and graduate level since 1987. He is particularly interested in the introductory physics curriculum for engineering and science majors. For decades he has collaborated closely with his MSU colleagues Wolfgang Bauer and Walter Benenson. They obtained NSF funding to develop novel teaching and laboratory techniques, authored multimedia physics CDs for their students at MSU's Lyman Briggs College, and co-authored a textbook on CD-ROM, called cliXX Physik. In 1992, they became early adopters of the Internet for teaching and learning by developing the first version of their online homework system. In subsequent years, they were instrumental in creating the LearningOnline Network with CAPA (LON-CAPA), which is now used at more than 70 universities and colleges in the United States and around the world. Since 2008, Bauer and Westfall have been part of a team of instructors, engineers, and physicists, who investigate the use of peer-assisted learning in the introductory physics curriculum. This project has received funding from the NSF STEM Talent Expansion Program, and its best practices have been incorporated into their textbook University Physics, which was published in 2010 by McGraw-Hill.

== Honors ==
Westfall was awarded the Alexander-von-Humboldt Foundation Distinguished Senior U.S. Scientist Award (Humboldt Prize, Humboldt-Forschungspreis für Naturwissenschafler aus den USA) in 2007. In 2002 he received the Distinguished Faculty Award from Michigan State University. He was elected fellow of the American Physical Society in 1999.

== Scientific Publications ==
- Westfall's list of publications at Google Scholar

== Textbooks ==
- Bauer, W.; Westfall, G. D. (2010). University Physics (with Modern Physics). McGraw Hill. ISBN 978-0-07-285736-8
  - Korean translation: Bauer, W.; Westfall, G. D. (2011). University Physics (with Modern Physics). McGraw Hill. ISBN 978-89-94464-56-5
  - Spanish translation: Bauer, W.; Westfall, G. D. (2011). Física para ingenieros y científicos. McGraw Hill. ISBN 978-607-15-0545-3
- Bauer, W.; Benenson, W.; Westfall, G. D. (2012). cliXX Physik (Version 2.5). Harri Deutsch. Archived from the original on 2021-10-29.
