= Andrew Sessler =

American physicist and humanitarian

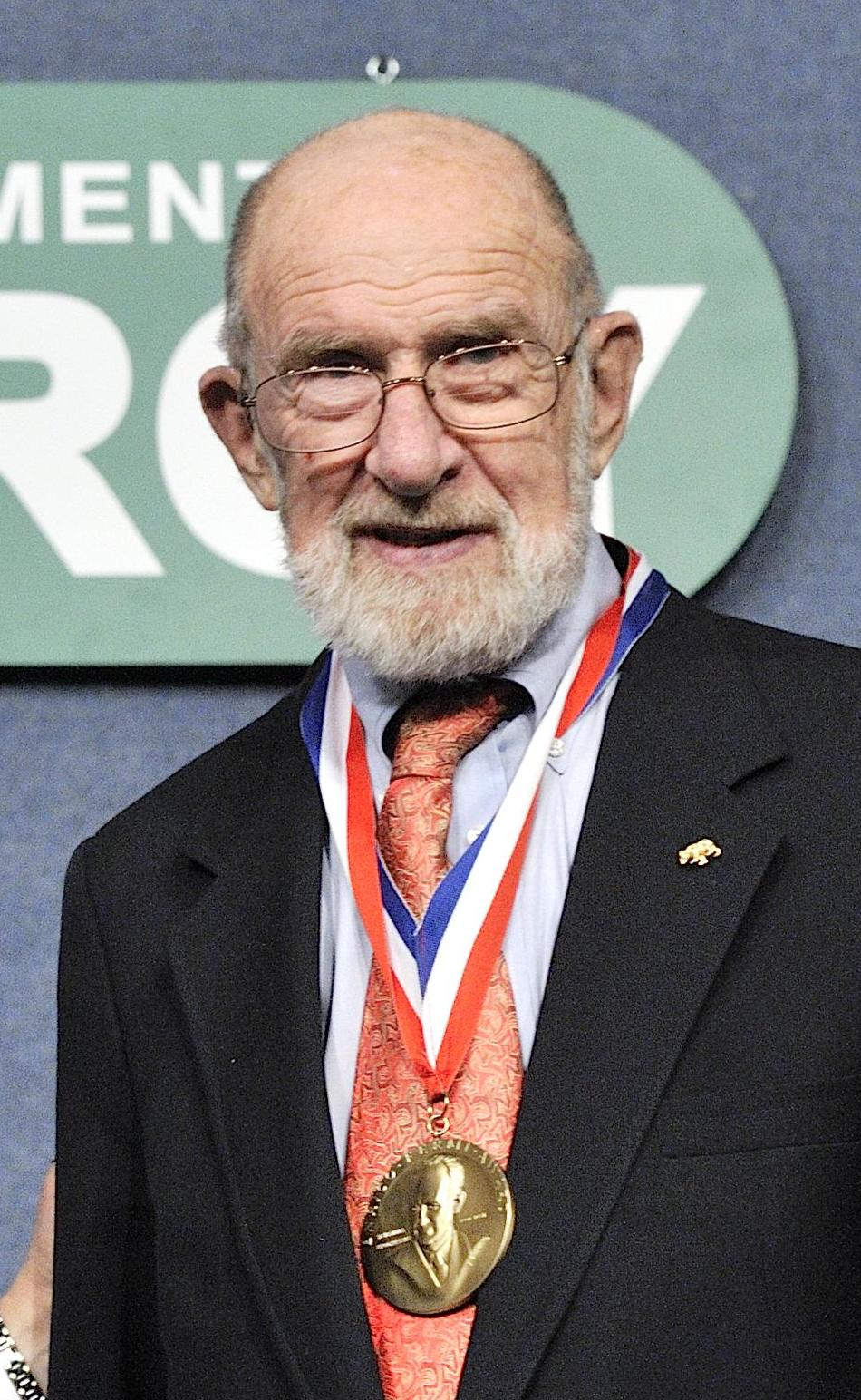
- Sessler in 2014 with his Enrico Fermi Award
- Born: Andrew Marienhoff Sessler; December 11, 1948; New York City, U.S.
- Died: April 17, 2014 (aged 65); Oakland, California, U.S.
- Education: Harvard University; Columbia University
- Scientific career
- Fields: Physics
- Workplaces: University of California, Berkeley; Lawrence Berkeley National Laboratory; Ohio State University
- Thesis: Hyperfine structure of ^{3}He (1953)
- Doctoral advisor: Henry M. Foley

Andrew Marienhoff Sessler (December 11, 1928 – April 17, 2014) was an American physicist, academic at University of California, Berkeley, former director of the Lawrence Berkeley National Laboratory (1973–1980), humanitarian and former president (1998) of the American Physical Society.

== Biography ==
Sessler was born in New York City in 1928. He was educated at Harvard University (B.A. in mathematics) and Columbia University (Ph.D. in physics) with dissertation Hyperfine structure of ^{3}He. From 1954 to 1959, he was a member of the faculty at Ohio State University before moving to the Lawrence Berkeley National Laboratory where he served as Lab Director in 1973-80.

His areas of expertise were the physics of particle accelerators, particle physics and plasma physics. In addition to accelerator physics, he also published theoretical work on quantum-theoretical statistical mechanics, atomic physics and superfluidity. Sessler was also active in the study group of the National Academy of Sciences of the long-term effects of the atomic bombing of Hiroshima and Nagasaki, and in an initiative group of APS against landmines. Sessler was a member of the American Committee for Peace in Chechnya.

In 1970, he became an Ernest Orlando Lawrence Award laureate. On January 13, 2014, Sessler and Allen J. Bard were awarded the Enrico Fermi Award.

Sessler lived in Oakland, California. He died in 2014 after a long illness.

== Books ==
- Sessler, Andrew M., ed. (1990). Beam Dynamics Issues of High-Luminosity Asymmetric Collider Rings. American Institute of Physics. ISBN 9780883187678..
- Pellegrini, Claudio; Sessler, Andrew M., eds. (31 January 1995). The Development of Colliders. Springer. ISBN 9781563963490.
- Sessler, Andrew; Wilson, Edmund (2007). Engines of Discovery: A Century of Particle Accelerators. World Scientific. ISBN 9789812700704. Sessler, Andrew (2014). 2nd edition. ISBN 978-981-4417-19-8; pbk

== See also ==
- List of members of the National Academy of Sciences (Physics)
