= Ingo Sick =

Swiss experimental nuclear physicist (1939–2021)

Ingo Sick (28 May 1939 — 30 May 2021) was a Swiss experimental nuclear physicist.

Sick earned his PhD in 1968 at the University of Basel. In 1983, he became an ausserordentlicher Professor (professor without chair) for Experimental Physics at Basel. In 1993, he succeeded Eugene Baumgartner and became an ordentlicher Professor. In 2004 he retired as an emeritus professor. He worked primarily on electron scattering from atomic nuclei and nucleons.

In 1987 he received with Bernard Frois the Tom W. Bonner Prize in Nuclear Physics.

Sick died on 30 May 2021 from stomach cancer, two days after his 82nd birthday.

== Selected works ==
- with Donnelly Elastic magnetic electron scattering from nuclei, Reviews of Modern Physics, Vol.56, 1984, pp. 461–566 doi:10.1103/RevModPhys.56.461
- with Vijay Pandharipande, De Witt Huberts Independent particle motion and correlations in Fermi systems, Reviews of Modern Physics 1997, pp. 981–991 doi:10.1103/RevModPhys.69.981
- Radial wave functions for valence nucleons, Comments on nuclear and particle physics, 1980, pp. 55–66 abstract
- Sick Elastic electron scattering from light nuclei, 2002
