= William Allen Zajc =

American nuclear physicist

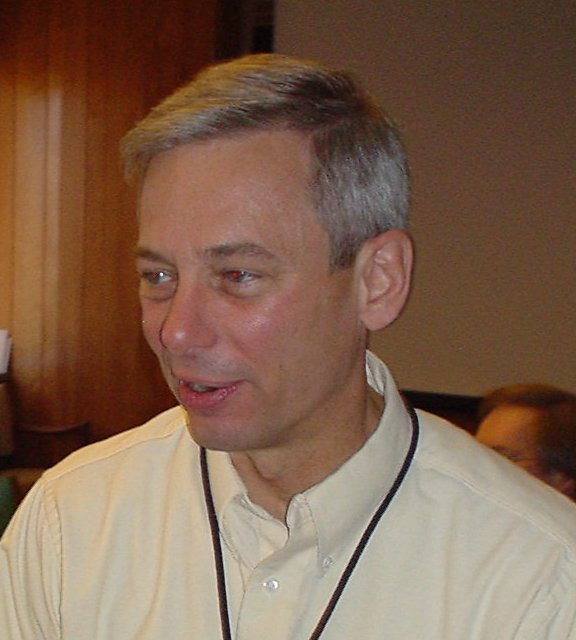
- William A. Zajc
- Born: November 14, 1953 (age 72); Barstow, California, U.S.
- Education: California Institute of Technology (B.S.), University of California, Berkeley (Ph.D.)
- Scientific career
- Fields: Physics, Nuclear physics, Heavy ion physics

William Allen Zajc /ˈzaɪts/ is a U.S. physicist and the I.I. Rabi Professor of Physics at Columbia University in New York, USA, where he has worked since 1987.

== Early life ==
Born in Barstow, California, on November 14, 1953, and raised in Brookfield, Wisconsin, he received his bachelor's degree from the California Institute of Technology in 1975. He went on to the doctoral program in physics at the University of California, Berkeley, where, as his thesis topic, he became the first person to use Hanbury-Brown Twiss correlations to measure the size of the interacting region between two colliding heavy ions.

== Career ==
From 1982 to 1986 he was first a post-doctoral fellow and then a professor at the University of Pennsylvania. In 1987 he accepted a professorship at Columbia University, where he has remained as a professor ever since. He has been a scientific leader in the field of heavy ion physics since early in his career, and he has performed extensive service for the broader nuclear physics community in the U.S. William A. Zajc was named a Fellow of the American Physical Society in 1997 and a Fellow of the AAAS in 2012.

Since the 1980s, his research has focused on experiments performed at Brookhaven National Laboratory (BNL) on Long Island, New York, first at the Alternating Gradient Synchrotron (AGS) and now at the Relativistic Heavy Ion Collider (RHIC). He was co-spokesperson of the AGS E859 experiment, which investigated strangeness production in heavy ion collisions, and later spokesperson of the PHENIX experiment at RHIC from 1997 to 2006. PHENIX is a multinational collaboration with over 500 scientists from more than a dozen countries and is one of the two large experiments at RHIC. PHENIX, along with three other RHIC experiments, determined that the relativistic heavy ion collisions at RHIC were successful in creating the quark–gluon plasma (QGP), a state of matter believed to have existed approximately 10 microseconds after the Big Bang. The RHIC experiments also discovered that this matter is in fact strongly interacting and nearly a perfect fluid. Since stepping down after nine years of dedicated service as spokesperson of PHENIX, he continues his research with the experiment, further characterizing the hot, dense matter formed in the collisions.

== Important contributions to physics ==
- As a graduate student, pioneered the use of Hanbury Brown Twiss techniques to measure the spatial extent of heavy ion collisions.
- Developed Monte Carlo methods for the generation of events with Bose–Einstein correlations.
- As co-spokesperson of E859, made seminal contributions to the measurement of strangeness production in low energy heavy ion collisions.
- Under his leadership as spokesperson, PHENIX published 31 Physical Review Letters covering all the major topics at RHIC, 16 papers in other peer-reviewed journals, and graduated 42 Ph.D.'s from institutions around the world.

== Teaching ==
Zajc teaches quantum mechanics at the graduate level and introductory physics courses for science and engineering majors, including a new course entitled "String Theory for Undergraduates". He served as chair of the Columbia University Physics Department from 2009 through 2013.

== Selected publications ==
- Riordan, Michael; Zajc, William A. (23 April 2006). "The First Few Microseconds: Overview/Mini Bangs". Scientific American.
- Zajc, W. A.; et al. (1984). "Two-pion correlations in heavy ion collisions". Physical Review C. 29 (6): 2173–2187. Bibcode:1984PhRvC..29.2173Z. doi:10.1103/PhysRevC.29.2173.
- Åkesson, T.; et al. (1985). "Search for Quark Deconfinement: Strangeness Production in pp, dd, pα, and αα Collisions at √^{s}NN = 31.5 and 44GeV". Physical Review Letters. 55 (23): 2535–2538. doi:10.1103/PhysRevLett.55.2535. PMID 10032172.
- Zajc, William A. (1986). "KNO scaling isn't what it used to be". Physics Letters B. 175 (2): 219–222. Bibcode:1986PhLB..175..219Z. doi:10.1016/0370-2693(86)90720-3.
- Zajc, William A. (1987). "Monte Carlo calculational methods for the generation of events with Bose-Einstein correlations". Physical Review D. 35 (11): 3396–3408. Bibcode:1987PhRvD..35.3396Z. doi:10.1103/PhysRevD.35.3396. PMID 9957593.
- Akiba, Y.; et al. (1993). "Bose-Einstein correlation of kaons in Si+Au collisions at 14.6A GeV/c". Physical Review Letters. 70 (8): 1057–1060. Bibcode:1993PhRvL..70.1057A. doi:10.1103/PhysRevLett.70.1057. PMID 10054275.
- Akiba, Y.; et al. (1996). "Production of φ Mesons in Central ^{28}Si+^{196}Au Collisions at 14.6A GeV/c". Physical Review Letters. 76 (12): 2021–2024. Bibcode:1996PhRvL..76.2021A. doi:10.1103/PhysRevLett.76.2021. PMID 10060586.
- Back, B.; et al. (2002). "Centrality dependence of the charged particle multiplicity near midrapidity in Au+Au collisions at √^{s}NN = 130 and 200 GeV". Physical Review C. 65 (6) 061901. arXiv:nucl-ex/0201005. doi:10.1103/PhysRevC.65.061901. hdl:1959.3/55877. S2CID 119479388.
- Adcox, K.; et al. (2002). "Measurement of Single Electrons and Implications for Charm Production in Au+Au Collisions at √^{s}NN = 130GeV". Physical Review Letters. 88 (19) 192303. arXiv:nucl-ex/0202002. doi:10.1103/PhysRevLett.88.192303. PMID 12005627. S2CID 27383325.
- Adcox, K.; et al. (2002). "Transverse-Mass Dependence of Two-Pion Correlations in Au+Au Collisions at √^{s}NN = 130 GeV". Physical Review Letters. 88 (19) 192302. arXiv:nucl-ex/0201008. doi:10.1103/PhysRevLett.88.192302. PMID 12005626. S2CID 118503841.
- Adcox, K.; et al. (2002). "Suppression of Hadrons with Large Transverse Momentum in Central Au+Au Collisions at √^{s}NN = 130 GeV". Physical Review Letters. 88 (2) 022301. arXiv:nucl-ex/0109003. doi:10.1103/PhysRevLett.88.022301. PMID 11801005. S2CID 119347728.

== Honors and awards ==
- 2014 Tom W. Bonner Prize in Nuclear Physics

== See also ==
- Relativistic Heavy Ion Collider
- Quark gluon plasma
