= Willy Haeberli =

Swiss-American physicist (1925–2021)

- Born: June 17, 1925; Zürich, Switzerland
- Died: October 4, 2021 (aged 96); Madison, Wisconsin, U.S.
- Occupation: Professor of Physics

Academic background
- Education: University of Basel, Switzerland
- Academic advisor: Huber

Academic work
- Main interests: His research focused on polarization, polarized targets and the study of parity of spin in addition to developing polarized ion sources used around the world in research

Willy Haeberli (June 17, 1925 – October 4, 2021) was a Swiss-American physicist and professor emeritus of Physics at the University of Wisconsin, Madison. He was known for his works in nuclear physics. He was a winner of the Tom W. Bonner Prize in Nuclear Physics and of the Humboldt Prize.
