= Felix Boehm =

Swiss–American physicist (1924–2021)

Felix Hans Boehm (June 9, 1924, Basel – May 25, 2021, Altadena, California) was a Swiss-American experimental physicist, known for his research on weak interactions, parity violation, and neutrino physics.

== Biography ==
He had four brothers and both his father and his paternal grandfather were in the publishing business. Felix Boehm completed his Matura in 1943 and was drafted into Swiss army, which allowed him to study physics part-time at the University of Geneva. In the autumn of 1943 he matriculated at ETH Zurich. There he took several classes from Wolfgang Pauli and graduated in physics with his Diplom in 1948 and his doctorate in 1951 with doctoral advisor Paul Scherrer. Boehm worked as an assistant to Scherrer from 1951 to March 1952 and then went as a Boese Fellow to Columbia University, where he studied with C. S. Wu for a year and a half. As a postdoctoral research fellow he went in July 1953 to Caltech, where he studied with Jesse DuMond and Charles Lauritsen. In 1957, Boehm married Ruth Sommerhalder, whom he met in 1956 at a social occasion at the Swiss consulate in Los Angeles. At Caltech he became in 1958 an assistant professor, in 1961 a full professor at Caltech, in 1985 William L. Valentine Professor of Physics, and in 1995 professor emeritus in retirement. In 1960, he played an essential role in bringing Rudolf Mössbauer to the California Institute of Technology. In 1961, Boehm was awarded a 2-year Sloan Research Fellowship.

He held visiting positions in 1957/58 at Heidelberg University (at the invitation of Jensen), 1965/66 at the University of Copenhagen, in 1971/72 at CERN, and in 1979/80 at the Institut Laue-Langevin in Grenoble, where he also worked with scientists from the Paul Scherrer Institute. He was a visiting professor in 1980 at LMU Munich and 1981 at ETH Zurich. (Years earlier he had turned down an offer of a professorship at ETH in favor of Caltech.)

In the 1950s, Boehm worked on experiments on parity violation and experimentally confirmed the violation first reported by C. S. Wu. In 1956, Boehm and Aaldert Wapstra made the confirmation by measuring the circular polarization of gamma rays in beta decay. At Caltech Boehm came into contact with the theorists Richard Feynman and Murray Gell-Mann. Boehm did research on X-ray spectroscopy in nuclear physics, specifically, isotope shift of K-shell electrons and then experiments involving muons at CERN and at the Los Alamos Meson Physics Facility (LAMPF). He collaborated with French and Swiss scientists on neutrino detection with an experiment set up in the Gotthard Tunnel. For a number of years, he and his group also searched in vain for violations of time reversal invariance in nuclear physics (but found upper bounds for such violations). At Caltech, he did research on double beta decay. In 1969 and 1970 he and J. C. Vanderleeden found parity non-conservation in nuclear forces by measuring the circular polarization of gamma rays from unpolarized atomic nuclei. Beginning in 1970 he collaborated extensively with the theorist Petr Vogel.

In 1980, Boehm received the Humboldt Research Award. In 1983 he was elected a member of the National Academy of Sciences.

In 1995, he received the Tom W. Bonner Prize in Nuclear Physics with citation:

"For his pivotal contributions to our understanding of the weak interaction and fundamental symmetries in the nucleus. We especially note (1) his measurements of positron polarization in beta decay and their impact on the development of the V-A theory of weak interactions, (2) his pioneering studies providing convincing evidence for parity violation in nuclear transitions, and (3) his frontier defining searches for violations of time-reversal invariance in nuclei and for neutrino oscillations."

In 2006, he was elected a Fellow of the American Association for the Advancement of Science.

Upon his death in 2021, he was survived by his widow and their two sons.

== Selected publications ==
=== Articles ===
- Murray, J. J.; Boehm, F.; Marmier, P.; Dumond, J. W. M. (1955). "Decays of ^{182}Ta and ^{183}Ta". Physical Review. 97 (4): 1007–1016. Bibcode:1955PhRv...97.1007M. doi:10.1103/PhysRev.97.1007. Archived from the original on 2022-05-16.
- Boehm, F.; Wapstra, A. H. (1958). "Beta-Gamma Circular Polarization Correlation Experiments". Physical Review. 109 (2): 456–461. Bibcode:1958PhRv..109..456B. doi:10.1103/PhysRev.109.456.
- Boehm, F.; Goldring, G.; Hagemann, G.B.; Symons, G.D.; Tveter, A. (1966). "A determination of the gyromagnetic ratios of some odd-A deformed nuclei from branching ratio measurements". Physics Letters. 22 (5): 627–629. Bibcode:1966PhL....22..627B. doi:10.1016/0031-9163(66)90683-4.
- Lee, P. L.; Boehm, F. (1973). "X-Ray Isotope Shifts and Variations of Nuclear Charge Radii in Isotopes of Nd, Sm, Dy, Yb, and Pb". Physical Review C. 8 (2): 819–828. Bibcode:1973PhRvC...8..819L. doi:10.1103/PhysRevC.8.819.
- Boehm, F.; Vogel, P. (1984). "Low-Energy Neutrino Physics and Neutrino Mass". Annual Review of Nuclear and Particle Science. 34 (1): 125–153. Bibcode:1984ARNPS..34..125B. doi:10.1146/annurev.ns.34.120184.001013.
- Reusser, D.; Treichel, M.; Boehm, F.; Broggini, C.; Fisher, P.; Fluri, L.; Gabathuler, K.; Henrikson, H.; Jörgens, V.; Mitchell, L.W.; Nussbaum, C.; Vuilleumier, J.-L. (1991). "Limits on cold dark matter from the Gotthard Ge experiment". Physics Letters B. 255 (1): 143–145. Bibcode:1991PhLB..255..143R. doi:10.1016/0370-2693(91)91155-O.
- Luescher, R.; Farine, J.; Boehm, F.; Busto, J.; Gabathuler, K.; Gervasio, G.; Henrikson, H.E.; Jörgens, V.; Lou, K.; Paić, A.; Schenker, D.; Tadsen, A.; Treichel, M.; Vuilleumier, J.-L.; Vuilleumier, J.-M.; Wong, H. (1998). "Search for ββ decay in ^{136}Xe: New results from the Gotthard experiment". Physics Letters B. 434 (3–4): 407–414. Bibcode:1998PhLB..434..407L. doi:10.1016/S0370-2693(98)00906-X.
- Boehm, F.; Busenitz, J.; Cook, B.; Gratta, G.; Henrikson, H.; Kornis, J.; Lawrence, D.; Lee, K.B; McKinny, K.; Miller, L.; Novikov, V.; Piepke, A.; Ritchie, B.; Tracy, D.; Vogel, P.; Wang, Y.-F; Wolf, J. (2001). "Search for neutrino oscillations at the Palo Verde nuclear reactors". Nuclear Physics B - Proceedings Supplements. 91 (1–3): 91–98. arXiv:hep-ex/9912050. Bibcode:2001NuPhS..91...91B. doi:10.1016/S0920-5632(00)00927-0. Archived from the original on 2022-04-28.
- Boehm, F.; Busenitz, J.; Cook, B.; Gratta, G.; Henrikson, H.; Kornis, J.; Lawrence, D.; Lee, K. B.; McKinny, K.; Miller, L.; Novikov, V.; Piepke, A.; Ritchie, B.; Tracy, D.; Vogel, P.; Wang, Y-F.; Wolf, J. (2001). "Final results from the Palo Verde neutrino oscillation experiment". Physical Review D. 64 (11) 112001. arXiv:hep-ex/0107009. Bibcode:2001PhRvD..64k2001B. doi:10.1103/PhysRevD.64.112001. S2CID 118820182.

=== Books ===
- Boehm, Felix; Vogel, Petr; Vogel, Paul (26 June 1992). Physics of Massive Neutrinos (2nd ed.). Cambridge University Press. ISBN 978-0-521-42849-1. 1st edition 1988
