= Hamish Robertson =

Canadian–American experimental physicist

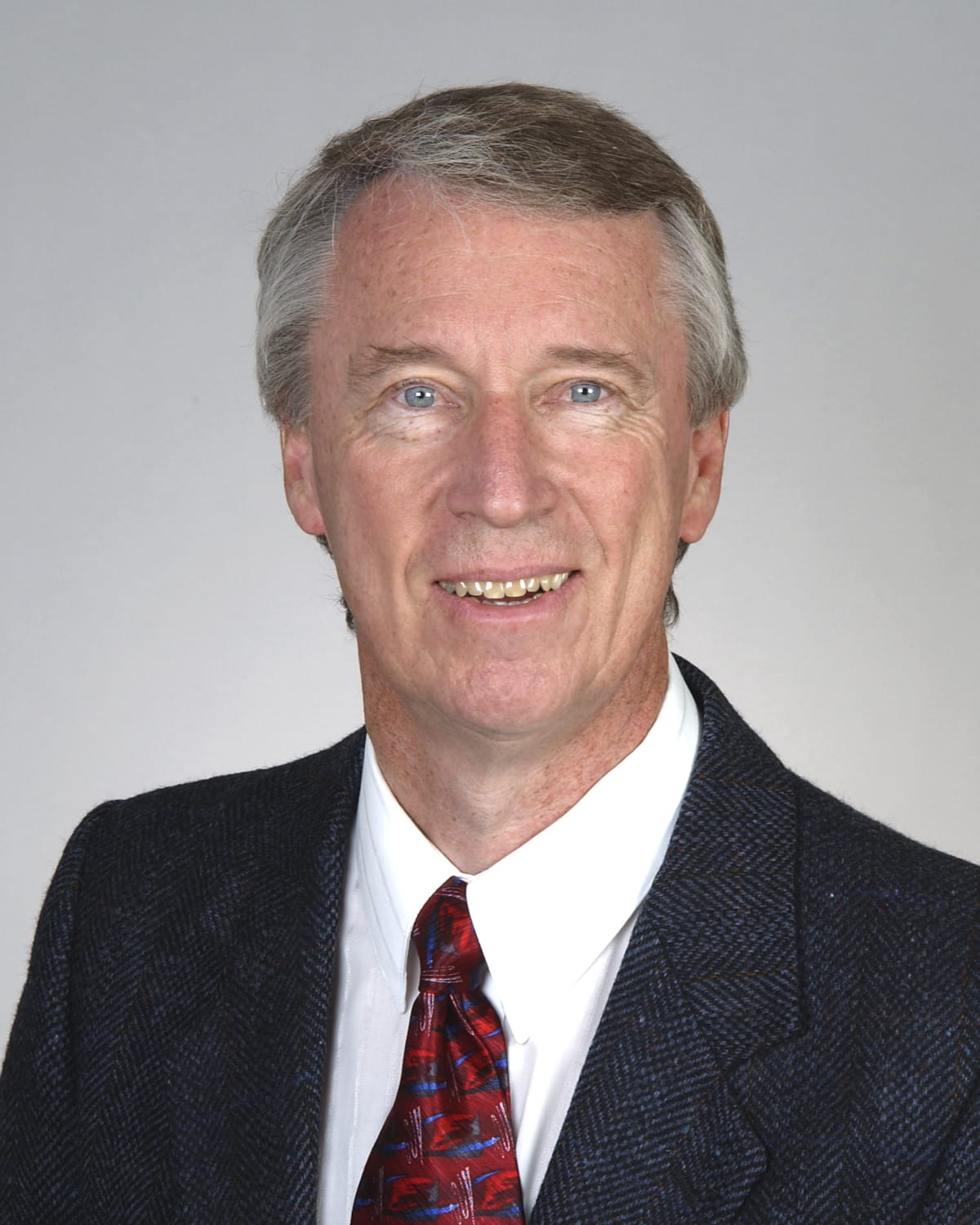
- Born: 3 October 1943 (age 82); Ottawa, Canada
- Citizenship: United States
- Education: Oxford University (B.A.); McMaster University (Ph.D.)
- Awards: Tom W. Bonner Prize (1997)
- Scientific career
- Fields: Physics (neutrino physics)
- Workplaces: Michigan State University (1972 – 1981); Los Alamos National Laboratory (1981 – 1984); University of Washington (1984 – )
- Thesis: Properties of the Odd-Odd Cobalt Nuclei (1971)
- Doctoral advisor: R. G. Summers-Gill

Robert Graham Hamish Robertson (born 3 October 1943) is a Canadian–American experimental physicist, specializing in neutrino physics. He is a Professor Emeritus at the University of Washington, where he was formerly the director of the University of Washington's Center for Experimental Nuclear Physics and Astrophysics.

== Biography ==
Robertson was born in Ottawa, Canada, in 1943 and attended elementary and secondary school in Canada and England. He received a Bachelor of Arts from University of Oxford in 1965. In 1971, he received a Doctor of Philosophy from McMaster University, working under R. G. Summers-Gill with a dissertation titled Properties of the odd-odd cobalt nuclei.

== Career ==
=== Michigan State University ===
After completing his Ph.D., Robertson joined Michigan State University as a postdoctoral fellow and later became a faculty member, earning the rank of Professor of Physics in 1981. During his tenure, he conducted pioneering experiments in nuclear astrophysics, including resolving the origins of lithium-6 through sensitive deuterium-helium-4 capture measurements. He also contributed to parity violation and nuclear reaction studies, and his research identified the first isobaric quintet of states in nuclei.

In 1976, Robertson was awarded an Alfred P. Sloan Foundation Fellowship.

=== Los Alamos National Laboratory ===
In 1981, Robertson joined the Los Alamos National Laboratory (LANL), where his research shifted toward neutrino physics. His work on tritium beta decay provided constraints on the electron neutrino mass, showing it was insufficient to close the universe gravitationally. Robertson also spearheaded LANL's collaboration in the Sudbury Neutrino Observatory (SNO), an experiment that confirmed neutrino flavor oscillations, challenging the Standard Model of particle physics.

In recognition of his contributions, he was appointed as a Fellow of Los Alamos National Laboratory in 1988.

=== University of Washington ===
In 1994, he became a professor at the University of Washington. He continued his research on neutrino physics, including work with the KATRIN Experiment and Project 8, which aimed to measure the neutrino mass with unprecedented sensitivity. He was named to the Boeing Distinguished Professorship in 2008 and retired as Professor Emeritus in 2017.

Robertson has been a visiting scientist at several institutions, including at Princeton University (1975–1976), Chalk River Laboratories (1979), Argonne National Laboratory (1980), and the Sudbury Neutrino Observatory (2003–2004).

He was on the editorial staff of Physical Review D and the Annual Review of Nuclear and Particle Science.

== Awards and honours ==
- 1976: Awarded a Sloan Foundation Fellowship
- 1982: Elected a Fellow of the American Physical Society
- 1997: Tom W. Bonner Prize in Nuclear Physics, American Physical Society
- 1998: Elected a Fellow of the Institute of Physics (London)
- 2003: Elected a Fellow of the American Academy of Arts and Sciences
- 2004: Elected a Member of the National Academy of Sciences

== See also ==
- Helium and Lead Observatory
