= Barbara Jacak =

Nuclear physicist

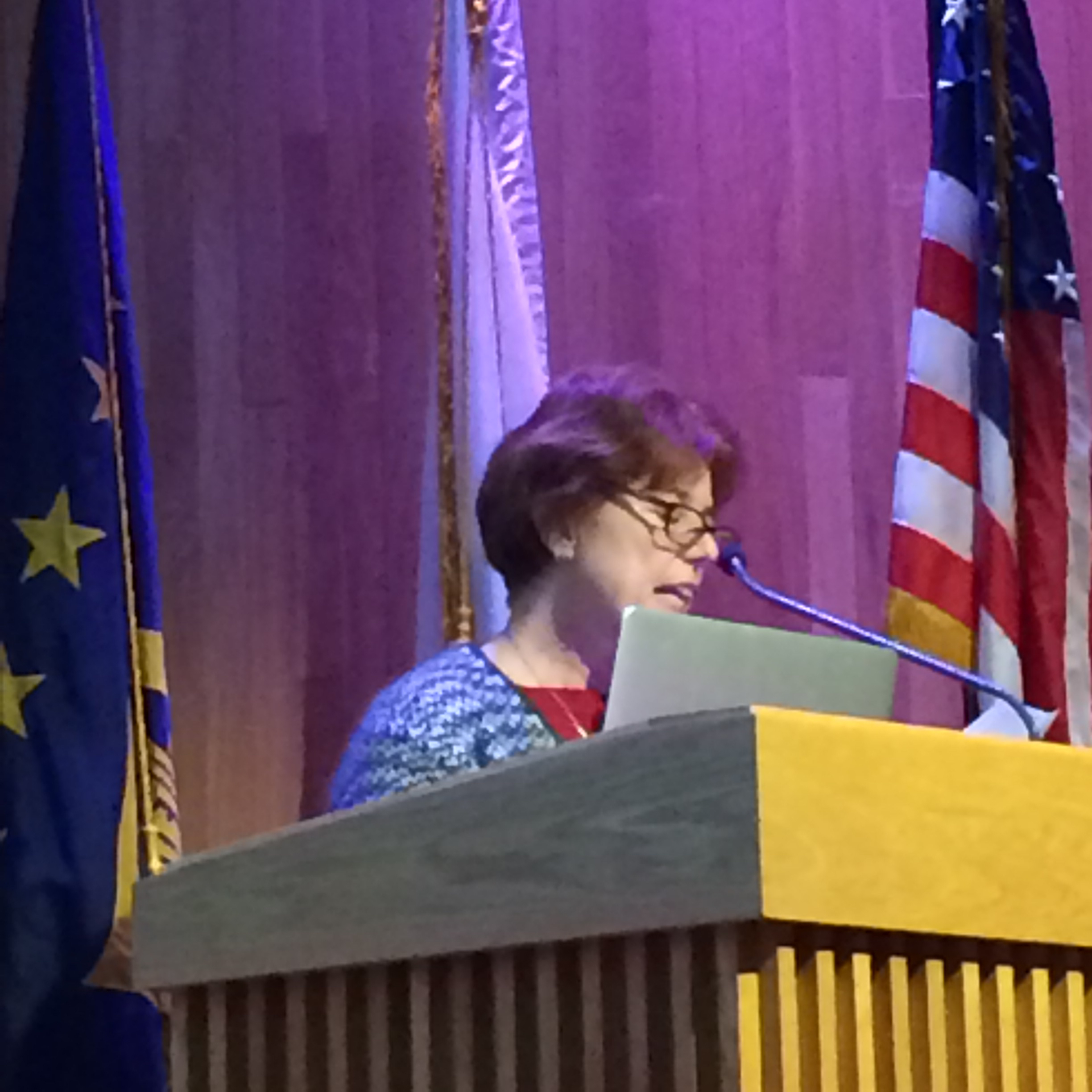
- Barbara Jacak introducing a speaker at Berkeley, January 7, 2016
- Born: California
- Education: Michigan State University; National Superconducting Cyclotron Laboratory
- Known for: Relativistic heavy ion collisions, PHENIX spokesperson
- Awards: J.R. Oppenheimer Fellow; Fellow of the American Physical Society; National Academy of Sciences; Tom W. Bonner Prize in Nuclear Physics (2019)
- Scientific career
- Fields: Physics, Nuclear Physics
- Workplaces: Los Alamos National Laboratory; Stony Brook University
- Doctoral advisor: Gary Westfall

Barbara Jacak (Polish pronunciation: [ˈjat͡sak]) is a nuclear physicist who uses heavy ion collisions for fundamental studies of hot, dense nuclear matter. She is director of the Nuclear Science Division, Lawrence Berkeley National Laboratory, and a professor of physics at UC Berkeley. Before going to Berkeley, she was a member of the Department of Physics and Astronomy at Stony Brook University, where she held the rank of distinguished professor. She is a leading member of the collaboration that built and operates the PHENIX detector, one of the large detectors that operated at the Relativistic Heavy Ion Collider at Brookhaven National Laboratory, and was involved in the discovery of the quark gluon plasma and its strongly coupled, liquid-like behavior. Throughout her career she has served on many advisory committees and boards, including the National Research Council Committee on Nuclear Physics, and the Physical Review C editorial board.

== Physics career ==
Jacak started her career at Michigan State University, where she completed her Ph.D. in chemical physics in 1984 working at the National Superconducting Cyclotron Laboratory (NSCL). She began working at Los Alamos National Laboratory in 1984 as a J.R. Oppenheimer Fellow. She became a laboratory staff member in 1987, continuing until 1996. During her time at Los Alamos, she also taught as an adjunct associate professor at the University of New Mexico, from 1994 to 1996. In 1997 she joined Stony Brook University to lead the Relativistic Heavy Ion Group, affiliated with the PHENIX experiment. In 2008, she was appointed to the rank of distinguished professor.

Since January, 2015, Jacak has been the director of the Nuclear Science Division at Lawrence Berkeley Laboratories. She also holds joint appointments as faculty senior scientist at Berkeley Lab and as professor of physics at UC Berkeley.

=== PHENIX Collaboration ===
Jacak has been a member of the PHENIX Collaboration since the detector was first proposed. She served on the Detector Council from 1992 to 1994 and the Executive Council from 1994 to 2006. In December 2006 she was elected as spokesperson of PHENIX. She served as spokesperson for two consecutive terms, stepping down at the end of 2012. Under her leadership as spokesperson, PHENIX published over 60 papers in peer-reviewed journals and graduated over 90 Ph.D.'s from institutions around the world. She oversaw the successful installation of three major detector upgrades, as well as several smaller upgrades.

=== ALICE Collaboration ===
Prof. Jacak has been a member of the ALICE Collaboration since March 2015. She is the team leader of the UC Berkeley group.

== Honors ==
- J. R. Oppenheimer Fellow at Los Alamos National Laboratory from 1984 to 1987
- 1997 – Fellow of the American Physical Society
- 2008 – Stony Brook University Distinguished Professor in 2008
- 2009 – Elected to be a member of the National Academy of Sciences
- 2019 – Tom W. Bonner Prize in Nuclear Physics
