= Wit Busza =

American physicist

Wit Busza is an American physicist, born in Romania and of Polish descent. He is a professor in physics at the Massachusetts Institute of Technology (MIT). He obtained a B.Sc. (1960) and Ph.D. (1964) from University College London. He began teaching at MIT in 1969 and was appointed as full professor in 1979. He was named a Margaret MacVicar Faculty Fellow in 1995. He is a member of the Polish Academy of Arts and Sciences and a fellow of the American Physical Society.

== Research interests ==
Busza's studies are primarily in the field of quark–gluon plasma. He has been the spokesperson of the PHOBOS experiment at the Relativistic Heavy Ion Collider. PHOBOS has the largest pseudorapidity coverage of all detectors and is tailored for bulk particle multiplicity measurement.

== Awards ==
- Buechner Prize for Outstanding Contributions to the MIT Physics Education Program (1990)
- MIT School of Science Prize for Excellence in Undergraduate Teaching (1993)
- American Physical Society’s Tom W. Bonner Prize in Nuclear Physics "for pioneering work on multi-particle production in proton-nucleus and nucleus-nucleus collisions, including the discovery of participant scaling, and for the conception and leadership of the PHOBOS experiment." (2023)
