= David W. Hertzog =

American particle physicist

David William Hertzog (born July 21, 1955) is an American particle physicist, known for his research in precision muon physics. He was elected a Member of the National Academy of Sciences in 2025.

== Biography ==
Hertzog graduated in 1977 with a bachelor's degree in physics from Wittenberg University in Springfield, Ohio. He received his doctorate in 1983 from the College of William & Mary. As a postdoc, from 1983 to 1986 he was a research associate at Carnegie Mellon University. At the University of Illinois Urbana-Champaign he was from 1986 to 1992 an assistant professor, from 1992 to 1997 an associate professor, and from 1997 to 2010 a full professor. In 2010 he became a professor at the University of Washington, where he is Arthur B. McDonald Distinguished Professor of Physics and director of the Center for Experimental Nuclear Physics and Astrophysics (CENPA).

Hertzog has gained an international reputation for precision measurements of the muon. At Brookhaven National Laboratory in the early 2000s he played an important role in measurements of the muon magnetic anomaly. At the Paul Scherrer Institute, he was a co-leader of the science team for the MuLan experiment that measured the muon lifetime to 1-ppm and determined the Fermi constant to 0.5-ppm. In 2021 he collaborated in the Fermilab Muon g-2 experiment that found a statistical discrepancy for the positive muon magnetic anomaly between the experimental value and the Standard Model prediction.

Hertzog developed Pb/SciFi (lead / scintillating fiber) calorimeters and other novel instrumentation including the suite of PbF_{2} calorimeters now used in high-precision measurements of the muon g-factor.

He was elected in 2000 a Fellow der American Physical Society and was awarded in 2004 a Guggenheim Fellowship. In 2022 he received the Tom W. Bonner Prize in Nuclear Physics for "advancing the frontiers of understanding nature's fundamental symmetries via unprecedented precision studies of the muon, including its lifetime, its anomalous magnetic moment, and its measurement by the pseudoscalar coupling constant."

In 1980 he married Nancy Beitman. At the University of Washington she is a Professor of Learning Sciences and Human Development.
