= George F. Bertsch =

American nuclear physicist

George F. Bertsch (born 5 November 1942 in Oswego, New York) is an American nuclear physicist.

Bertsch received in 1962 his bachelor's degree from Swarthmore College and in 1965 his Ph.D. from Princeton University. In 1965–1966 he was a postdoc at the Niels Bohr Institute in Copenhagen. He was in 1966–1968 an instructor and in 1968–1971 an assistant professor at Princeton (with leave of absence in 1969–1970 when he was an assistant professor at Massachusetts Institute of Technology). He was in 1971–1974 an assistant professor and in 1974–1985 a full professor at Michigan State University. In 1985 he became a professor at the University of Washington in Seattle. From 1996 to 2005 he was editor-in-chief of Reviews of Modern Physics.

His research in nuclear theory began with spectroscopy and particularly giant resonances and went on to the properties of high density matter and their experimental implications. Most recently he has been pursuing the connections between theoretical techniques used in different disciplines, seeking applications of nuclear techniques in such areas as condensed matter and vice versa.

In Professor Bertsch's own words:

My main research interest is the application of quantum many-particle theory to physical systems. The particular areas of current research are nuclear structure and reactions and electronic excitations of molecules and condensed matter. Together with Kazuhiro Yabana, I introduced the real-time method to calculate the dynamic response in those systems. My work has been recognized by the American Physical Society, which awarded me the Bonner Prize in 2004 for my "many varied contributions to nuclear structure and reaction theory, which have guided and illuminated experiments for four decades." I have more than 350 scientific publications with over 25,000 citations with a rank of over 80 on the Hirsch index.

In 1978 he was elected a Fellow of the American Physical Society. For the academic year 2002–2003 he was a Guggenheim Fellow. In 2004 he was awarded the Tom W. Bonner Prize in Nuclear Physics.

== Selected publications ==
- as editor: Nuclear Theory 1981 (Proceedings of the Nuclear Theory Summer Workshop, Santa Barbara 1981), World Scientific 1982
- as editor with D. Kurath: Nuclear Spectroscopy, Springer 1980 (Workshop Gull Lake Michigan 1979)
- The practitioner's shell model, Elsevier 1972 ISBN 0-444-10348-1
- Nuclear Vibrations, Lecture Notes in Physics vol. 119, 1979, pp. 69
- with P. F. Bortignon, Ricardo A. Broglia: Damping of nuclear vibrations, Reviews of Modern Physics, vol. 55, 1983, pp. 287–314
- as editor with R. Broglia: Response of nuclei under extreme conditions, Plenum Press 1988 (Erice School 1986)
- Bertsch, George F. (1989). "How Broadly to Take Temperature?". Physics Today. 42 (1): 13. Bibcode:1989PhT....42a..13B. doi:10.1063/1.2810871.
- with R. Broglia: Oscillations of finite quantum systems, Cambridge University Press 1994 ISBN 0-521-41148-3; 2005
- Vibrations of the atomic nucleus, Scientific American, May 1983
- with B. Mueller, J. Negele, J. Friar, V. Pandharipande: Nuclear theory white paper 1995

https://books.google.com
