= Harald A. Enge =

Norwegian-American nuclear physicist

Harald Anton Enge
- Born: September 28, 1920; Fauske Municipality, Nordland, Norway
- Died: April 14, 2008 (aged 87); Middlesex County, Massachusetts
- Occupations: experimental nuclear physicist, inventor of instrumentation used in nuclear physics
- Known for: Enge split-pole spectrograph

Harald Anton Enge (September 28, 1920, Fauske Municipality, Nordland, Norway – April 14, 2008, Middlesex County, Massachusetts) was a Norwegian-American experimental nuclear physicist and inventor of instrumentation used in nuclear physics. He is known for the Enge split-pole spectrograph, which became a standard instrument of nuclear physics research.

== Biography ==
Enge completed his secondary education in 1940 in Bodø. He studied electrical engineering and received in 1947 his engineering degree from the Norwegian Institute of Technology (now part of the Norwegian University of Science and Technology). He married his first wife in 1947. From 1948 to 1955 he was a research associate and lecturer in physics at the University of Bergen. For a year and a half in 1950 and 1951, he worked at Massachusetts Institute of Technology (MIT). For four months he was supported by MIT's Foreign Students Summer Program and then was given a salaried job by William Weber Buechner (1914–1985). At MIT Enge did research in nuclear physics using a magnetic spectrograph while working with the team led by Robert J. Van de Graaff. During this time at MIT, Enge also designed his first broad-range spectrograph, which he built when he returned to the University of Bergen. In 1954 he received his doctorate from the University of Bergen. His dissertation was supervised by Bjørn Trumpy.

In the MIT physics department, Enge was an instructor from 1955 to 1956, an assistant professor from 1956 to 1959, an associate professor from 1959 to 1963, and a full professor from 1963 to 1986, when he retired as professor emeritus. He became a U.S. citizen.

He was, for many years, the director of the MIT research group started by Robert J. Van de Graaff and was an internationally recognized expert on the design of magnetic spectrometers. Enge held multiple patents in various fields including magnetic and electric optics, accelerators, power supplies and mass separators.

In 1967 he was co-founder and chair of Deuteron Inc. He was also associated with the Deltaray Corporation (1969 to 1973) and the Gammaray Corporation (1981).

He received in 1984 the Tom W. Bonner Prize in Nuclear Physics for his work in the field of nuclear physics.

In 1985 he received an honorary doctorate from the University of Bergen.

His first wife died in 1988. Upon his death in 2008, he was survived by his second wife, three sons from his first marriage, seven grandchildren, and five great-grandchildren.

== Selected publications ==
=== Articles ===
- Enge, Harald A. (1958). "Combined Magnetic Spectrograph and Spectrometer". Review of Scientific Instruments. 29 (10): 885–888. Bibcode:1958RScI...29..885E. doi:10.1063/1.1716028.
- Enge, Harald A. (1963). "Achromatic Magnetic Mirror for Ion Beams". Review of Scientific Instruments. 34 (4): 385–389. Bibcode:1963RScI...34..385E. doi:10.1063/1.1718372.
- Enge, H. A.; Buechner, W. W. (1963). "Multiple-Gap Magnetic Spectrograph for Charged-Particle Studies". Review of Scientific Instruments. 34 (2): 155–162. Bibcode:1963RScI...34..155E. doi:10.1063/1.1718292.
- Enge, Harald A. (1964). "Effect of Extended Fringing Fields on Ion-Focusing Properties of Deflecting Magnets". Review of Scientific Instruments. 35 (3): 278–287. Bibcode:1964RScI...35..278E. doi:10.1063/1.1718806.
- Enge, H.A. (1964). "Magnetic spectrographs and beam analyzers". Nuclear Instruments and Methods. 28 (1): 119–130. Bibcode:1964NucIM..28..119E. doi:10.1016/0029-554X(64)90358-1.
- Spencer, J.E.; Enge, H.A. (1967). "Split-pole magnetic spectrograph for precision nuclear spectroscopy". Nuclear Instruments and Methods. 49 (2): 181–193. Bibcode:1967NucIM..49..181S. doi:10.1016/0029-554X(67)90684-2.
- Septier, Albert, ed. (1967). "Chapter 4.2 Deflecting magnets by Harald A. Enge". Focusing of charged particles, Volume II. Academic Press. pp. 203–264. &pg=203 chapter from 2012 reprint
- Drentje, A.G.; Enge, H.A.; Kowalski, S.B. (1974). "The QMG/2, a magnetic spectrograph for nuclear research". Nuclear Instruments and Methods. 122: 485–490. Bibcode:1974NucIM.122..485D. doi:10.1016/0029-554X(74)90517-5.
- Salomaa, M.; Enge, H.A. (1977). "Velocity selector for heavy-ion separation". Nuclear Instruments and Methods. 145 (2): 279–282. Bibcode:1977NucIM.145..279S. doi:10.1016/0029-554X(77)90422-0.
- Enge, Harald A. (1979). "Magnetic spectrographs for nuclear reaction studies". Nuclear Instruments and Methods. 162 (1–3): 161–180. Bibcode:1979NucIM.162..161E. doi:10.1016/0029-554X(79)90711-0.
- Wouters, J.M.; Vieira, D.J.; Wollnik, H.; Enge, H.A.; Kowalski, S.; Brown, K.L. (1985). "Optical design of the tofi (Time-of-flight isochronous) spectrometer for mass measurements of exotic nuclei". Nuclear Instruments and Methods in Physics Research Section A: Accelerators, Spectrometers, Detectors and Associated Equipment. 240 (1): 77–90. Bibcode:1985NIMPA.240...77W. doi:10.1016/0168-9002(85)90390-0.

=== Books ===
- Enge, Harald A. (1966). Introduction to nuclear physics. Addison-Wesley. ISBN 978-0201018707.
- Enge, Harald A.; Wehr, M. Russell; Richards, James A. (1972). Introduction to atomic physics. Addison-Wesley. ISBN 978-1114663503. 2nd edition. 1974.
