= PHENIX detector =

Coordinates: 40.8831°N 72.8817°W

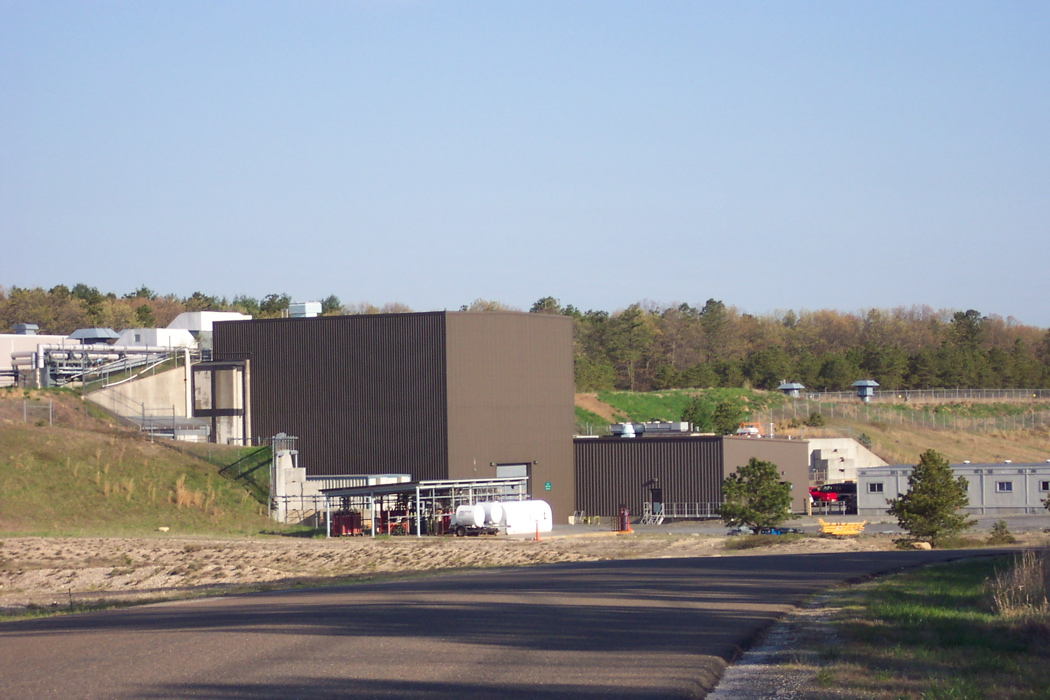
PHENIX experimental hall outside view

The PHENIX detector (for Pioneering High Energy Nuclear Interaction eXperiment) is the largest of the four experiments that have taken data at the Relativistic Heavy Ion Collider (RHIC) in Brookhaven National Laboratory, United States.

== Overview ==
PHENIX is an exploratory experiment for the investigation of high energy collisions of heavy ions and protons, and is designed specifically to measure direct probes of the collisions such as electrons, muons, and photons. The primary goal of PHENIX is to discover and study a new state of matter called quark–gluon plasma (QGP). Detecting and understanding the QGP allows us to understand better the universe in the moments after the Big Bang.

The PHENIX Experiment consists of a collection of detectors, each of which perform a specific role in the measurement of the results of a heavy ion collision. The detectors are grouped into two central arms, which are capable of measuring a variety of particles including pions, protons, kaons, deuterons, photons, and electrons, and two muon arms which focus on the measurement of muon particles. There are also additional event characterization detectors that provide additional information about a collision, and a set of three huge magnets that bend the trajectories of the charged particles. These detectors work together in an advanced high-speed data acquisition system to collect information about the event and subsequently investigate properties of the QGP.

The experiment consists of a collaboration of more than 400 scientists and engineers from around the world. The collaboration is led by a spokesperson, elected by members every three years, along with a team of deputies and other appointed members who oversee various aspects of operating the detector and managing the large group of scientist and institutions affiliated with it. Past and present spokespeople include Shoji Nagamiya (1992–1998), William Allen Zajc (1998–2006), and Barbara Jacak (2007–2012).

== The physics of PHENIX ==
The PHENIX collaboration performs basic research with high energy collisions of heavy ions and protons. The primary mission of PHENIX is the following:

- Search for a new state of matter called the quark–gluon plasma, which is believed to be the state of matter existing in the universe shortly after the Big Bang. PHENIX data suggest that a new form of matter has indeed been discovered, and that it behaves like a perfect fluid. PHENIX scientists are now working to study its properties.
- Study matter under extreme conditions of temperature and pressure.
- Learn where the proton gets its spin.
- Study the most basic building blocks of nature and the forces that govern them.
- Create a map of the quantum chromodynamics phase diagram.

== See also ==
- Relativistic Heavy Ion Collider
