= Vernon W. Hughes =

American physicist

Vernon Willard Hughes (May 28, 1921 – March 25, 2003) was an American physicist specializing in research of subatomic particles. Hughes was born in Kankakee, Illinois. During World War II, he worked at the M.I.T. Radiation Lab. He earned his PhD under I. I. Rabi at Columbia University in 1950. Hughes was notable for his research of muons which showed the existence of previously undetected matter. He was also noted for research that showed that protons have gluons and quarks. Hughes was a member of the National Academy of Sciences, Sterling Professor at Yale University, and a recipient of Rumford Prize, and a recipient of Davisson-Germer Prize in Atomic Physics and the Tom W. Bonner Prize in Nuclear Physics, both from the American Physical Society.

== See also ==
- Hughes–Drever experiment
