= LON-CAPA =

E-learning platform

- Developer: Michigan State University
- Written in: Perl
- Operating system: Cross-platform
- Type: Course Management System
- License: GPL
- Website: lon-capa.org

LON-CAPA (Learning Online Network with Computer-Assisted Personalized Approach) is an e-learning platform, also known as a Course Management System (CMS) or Learning Management System (LMS). It possesses the standard features of many learning platforms (user roles, calendar, e-mail, chat rooms, blogs, resource construction, test grading, etc.), but it differs from traditional e-learning platforms in that its many web servers (in various parts of the world) can communicate with each other. Consequently, the term LON-CAPA can also refer to the LON-CAPA network, i.e. the entire set of LON-CAPA web servers and the specific implementation of an internet protocol that connects these web servers. LON-CAPA can also refer to the LON-CAPA project, i.e. the core team of scientists and programmers that develop and maintain the LON-CAPA software.

There are, as of 2010, more than 160 LON-CAPA domains, where a domain is a unified set of LON-CAPA web servers. LON-CAPA domains are operated, generally speaking, by individual universities and high schools in the United States and Canada, but include private organizations and a significant number of universities in Europe, Asia, South America and Africa. The LON-CAPA network allows participating universities and schools to create learning resources (test problems, web pages, etc.) and to share them across the network. This collaborative aspect is LON-CAPA's most distinctive feature.

Another special feature of LON-CAPA is the ability to design test resources (called problems) that make use of random numbers (stored in Perl variables). This allows a single "problem resource" to generate a variety of similar (but different) test exercises, thus significantly reducing the risk of cheating amongst students.

Currently, the great majority of LON-CAPA's learning resources are written in English and focus on the mathematical and natural sciences, mostly significantly physics and chemistry. The learning platform works extensively with LaTeX, a language used to represent formulas and mathematical expressions. The project is funded by the National Science Foundation (NSF).

LON-CAPA is open source and free of licensing fees. Significant technologies include Linux, Apache, mod_perl, MySQL, LaTeX and CPAN. The core LON-CAPA development team is based at Michigan State University in East Lansing, Michigan. There are also major LON-CAPA network nodes at Simon Fraser University, the University of Illinois at Urbana-Champaign, and Purdue University.

The name LON-CAPA is an acronym, derived from Learning Online Network with Computer-Assisted Personalized Approach. In 1999, two distinct e-learning projects, CAPA and LectureOnline, joined efforts in the creation of LON-CAPA, which provides a superset of the CAPA and LectureOnline functionalities.
