= Helen Caines =

Physicist

Helen Caines FInstP
- Born: Helen Louise Caines
- Education: University of Birmingham (BSc, PhD)
- Known for: Quark–gluon plasma STAR experiment
- Scientific career
- Fields: Nuclear physics Heavy-ion physics
- Workplaces: Yale University; Ohio State University
- Thesis: A study of strangeness production in Pb-Pb collisions at 158 GeV/nucleon (1996)
- Website: physics.yale.edu/people/helen-caines

Helen Louise Caines FInstP is the Horace D. Taft Professor of Physics at Yale University and a member of the Yale Wright Laboratory. She is a nuclear physicist who studies the quark–gluon plasma (QGP) using heavy-ion collisions. She was the elected co-spokesperson of the STAR experiment at the Relativistic Heavy Ion Collider (RHIC) from 2017 to 2023 and is also a collaborator on the ALICE experiment at the Large Hadron Collider and the ePIC experiment at the future Electron-Ion Collider.

== Education ==
Caines studied physics at the University of Birmingham, graduating in 1992. She earned her PhD at Birmingham in 1996, with doctoral research conducted on the NA49 experiment at the CERN SPS, where she studied strangeness production in lead–lead collisions as a probe of quark–gluon plasma formation.

== Career ==
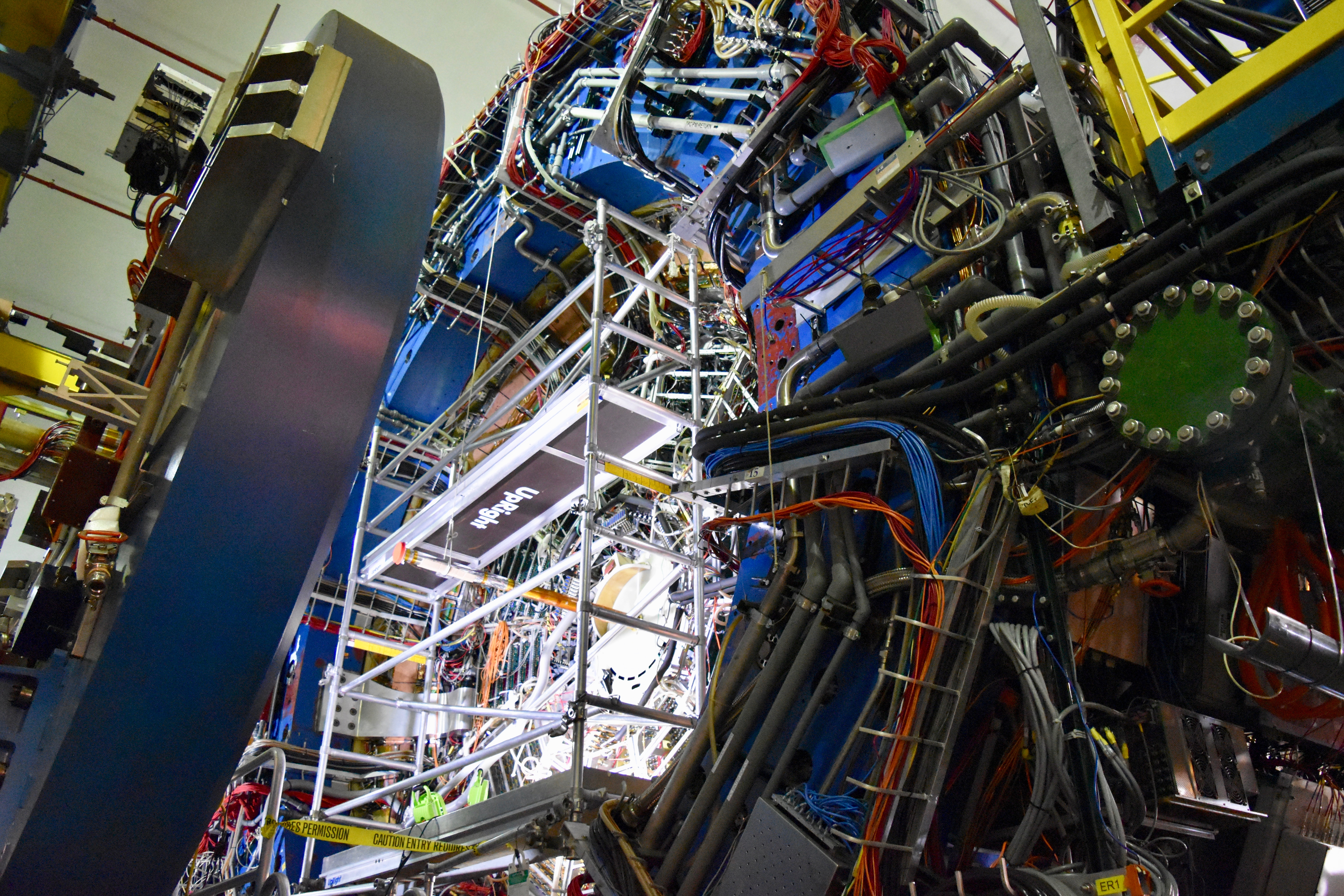
The STAR Detector at the Relativistic Heavy Ion Collider

After completing her doctorate, Caines joined Ohio State University as a postdoctoral researcher in 1996, working on the STAR experiment at Brookhaven National Laboratory. She was elected a junior representative of the STAR collaboration in 1998.

Caines was appointed assistant professor of physics at Yale University in 2004 and promoted to associate professor in 2010. Along with Zhangbu Xu, she served as elected co-spokesperson of the STAR experiment from 2017 to 2023, overseeing a collaboration of more than 60 institutions in 13 countries. In 2024, she was appointed the Horace D. Taft Professor of Physics. She serves as Director of Graduate Studies for the Yale Department of Physics.

In addition to STAR, Caines is a collaborator on the ALICE experiment at the Large Hadron Collider at CERN and has joined the ePIC collaboration, the experiment selected for the future Electron-Ion Collider. She served on the Nuclear Science Advisory Committee (NSAC) of the United States Department of Energy and contributed to the United States Long Range Plan for Nuclear Physics.

== Research ==
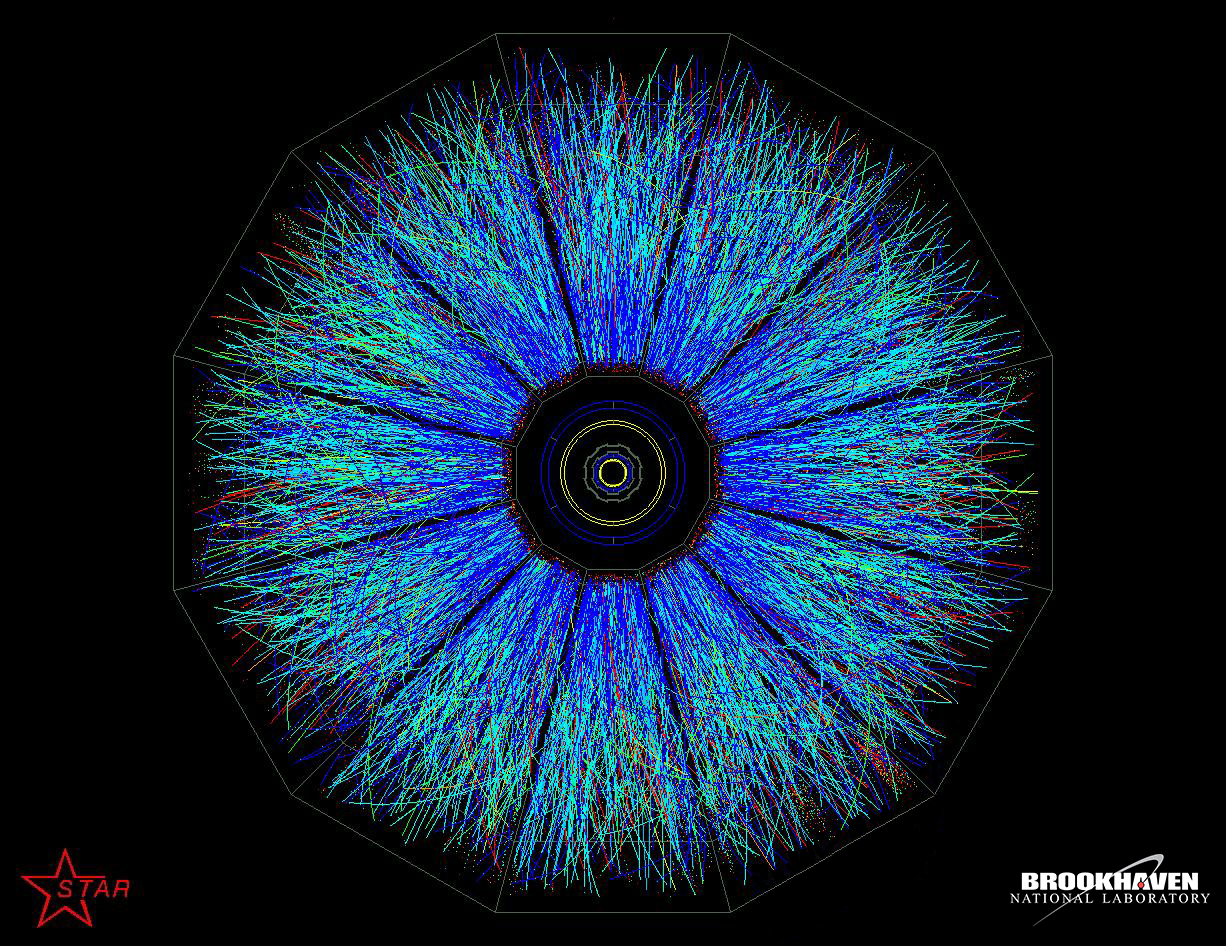
The collision of two gold ions at the Brookhaven National Laboratory.

Caines' research focuses on understanding the behaviour of nuclear matter under extreme conditions of temperature and density, using heavy-ion collisions to create and study the quark–gluon plasma (QGP), the state of matter believed to have existed microseconds after the Big Bang.

Her early work at RHIC contributed to establishing the properties of the QGP through measurements of hadronic particle production in the STAR detector. She has played a central role in the RHIC beam energy scan programme, studying Au+Au collisions at centre-of-mass energies from √s_{NN} = 7.7 to 200 GeV to map the QCD phase diagram and search for the predicted critical point of the transition between hadronic matter and the QGP.

A widely noted result from Caines' group was the measurement of global hyperon polarization in heavy-ion collisions, which demonstrated that the QGP is the most vortical fluid ever observed. She has also been involved in the isobar collision programme, comparing ruthenium–ruthenium and zirconium–zirconium collisions to test for the chiral magnetic effect in QCD matter.

More recently, Caines has applied machine learning techniques to heavy-ion physics, including the use of artificial neural networks to identify quark and gluon jets in the dense environment of heavy-ion collisions.

== Teaching and service ==
Caines developed the course Being Human in STEM at Yale, which examines how socioeconomic background, gender, race, religion, and sexuality shape the experience of working in STEM. The course was modelled on a similar programme at Amherst College.

She has served on the American Physical Society's Committee on the Status of Women in Physics and the Committee on Minorities in Physics. She has organized major conferences in her field, including the Critical Point and Onset of Deconfinement (CPOD) International Conference and the Strangeness in Quark Matter International Conference.

== Awards and honours ==
- 2003 – Engineering and Physical Sciences Research Council Advanced Research Fellowship
- 2005 – Enseignant Invité fellowship, University of Strasbourg
- 2008 – Elected Fellow of the Institute of Physics (FInstP)
- 2012 – APS Woman Physicist of the Month
- 2019 – Elected Fellow of the American Physical Society
- 2024 – Appointed Horace D. Taft Professor of Physics
