= Euler–Heisenberg Lagrangian =

Effective quantum electrodynamics action

In physics, the Euler–Heisenberg Lagrangian describes the non-linear dynamics of electromagnetic fields in vacuum and is consequently an example of nonlinear electrodynamics. It was first obtained by Werner Heisenberg and Hans Heinrich Euler in 1936. By treating the vacuum as a medium, it predicts rates of quantum electrodynamics (QED) light interaction processes.

== Physics ==
It takes into account vacuum polarization to one loop, and is valid for electromagnetic fields that change slowly compared to the inverse electron mass,

$$\mathcal{L} =-\mathcal{F} -\frac{1}{8\pi^{2}}\int_{0}^{\infty}\exp\left(-m^{2}s\right)\left[(es)^{2}\frac{\operatorname{Re}\cosh\left(es\sqrt{2\left(\mathcal{F} + i\mathcal{G}\right)}\right)}{\operatorname{Im}\cosh\left(es\sqrt{2\left(\mathcal{F} + i\mathcal{G}\right)}\right)}\mathcal{G}-\frac{2}{3}(es)^{2}\mathcal{F} - 1\right]\frac{ds}{s^{3}}.$$

Here m is the electron mass, e the electron charge, $\mathcal{F}=\frac{1}{2}\left(\mathbf{B}^2 - \mathbf{E}^2\right)$, and $\mathcal{G}=\mathbf{E}\cdot\mathbf{B}$.

In the weak field limit, this becomes

$$\mathcal{L} = \frac{1}{2}\left(\mathbf{E}^{2}-\mathbf{B}^{2}\right)+\frac{2\alpha^{2}}{45 m^{4}}\left[\left(\mathbf{E}^2 - \mathbf{B}^2\right)^{2} + 7 \left(\mathbf{E}\cdot\mathbf{B}\right)^{2}\right].$$

It describes photon–photon scattering in QED; Robert Karplus and Maurice Neuman calculated the full amplitude, which is very small.

== Experiments ==
Delbrück scattering of gamma rays was observed in 1953 by Robert Wilson. Photon splitting in strong magnetic fields was measured in 2002. Light-by-light scattering can be studied using the strong electromagnetic fields of the hadrons collided at the LHC, and its observation was reported by the ATLAS Collaboration in 2019.

PVLAS is searching for vacuum polarization of laser beams crossing magnetic fields to detect effects from axion dark matter. No signal has been found and searches continue. OSQAR at CERN is also studying vacuum birefringence.

In 2016 a team of astronomers from Italy, Poland, and the U.K. reported observations of the light emitted by a neutron star (pulsar RX J1856.5−3754). The star is surrounded by a very strong magnetic field (10^{9} T), and birefringence is expected from the vacuum polarization described by the Euler–Heisenberg Lagrangian. A degree of polarization of about 16% was measured and was claimed to be "large enough to support the presence of vacuum birefringence, as predicted by QED". Fan et al. pointed that their results are uncertain due to low accuracy of star model and the direction of the neutron magnetization axis.

In July 2021, the first known observation of vacuum birefringence was reported by the STAR experiment at the Relativistic Heavy Ion Collider, the Breit–Wheeler process was also studied although only evidence was reported.

In May 2022, the first study of IXPE has hinted the possibility of vacuum birefringence on 4U 0142+61.

== See also ==
- Birefringence
- Circular dichroism
- Chiral magnetic effect
- Schwinger limit
- Schwinger effect
- Uehling potential
- Electric polarization
- Kerr effect
