= John Harris (physicist) =

American experimental physicist

John W. Harris
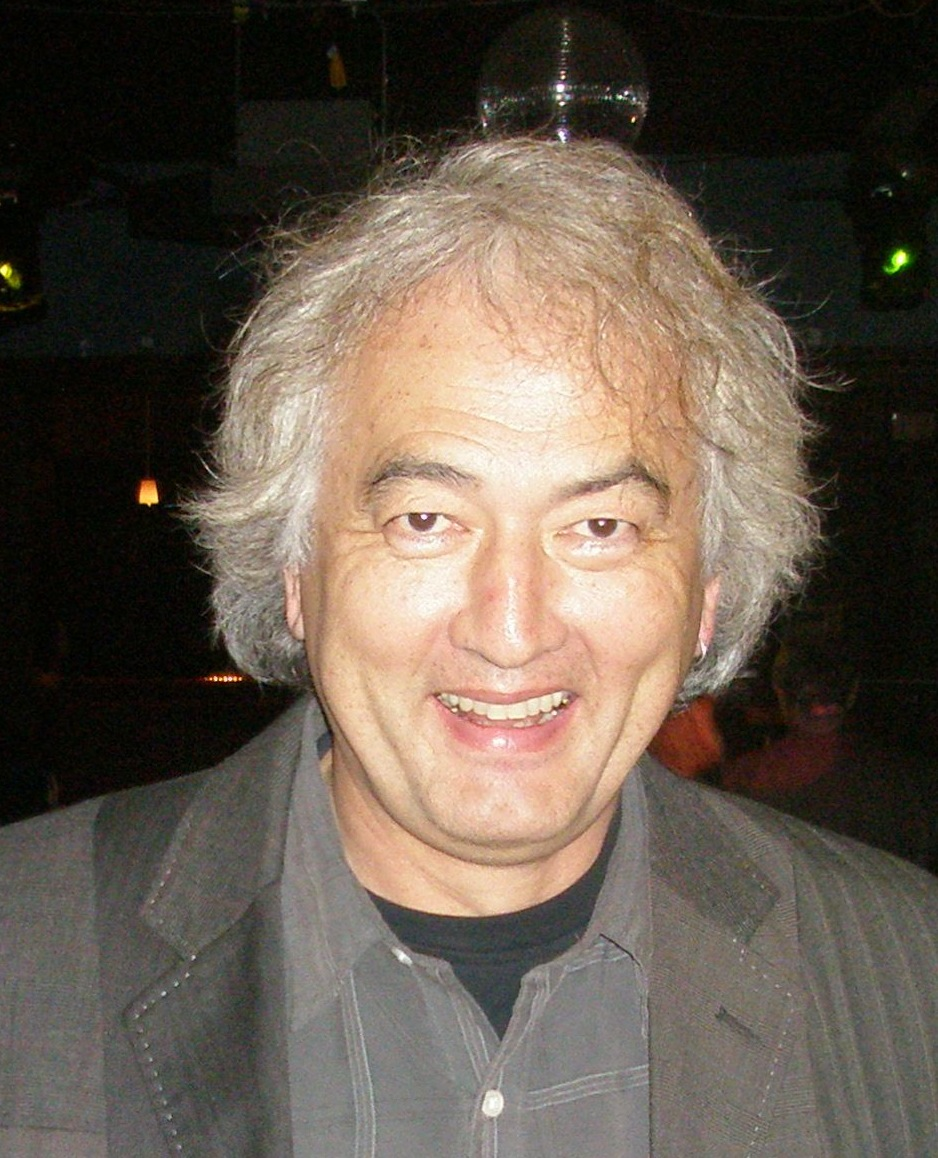
- Born: March 14, 1950 (age 76)
- Education: Stony Brook University
- Known for: Relativistic heavy ion physics
- Awards: Humboldt Prize; Fellow of the American Physical Society; Top 40 Distinguished Alumni, on the occasion of the 40th Anniversary of Stony Brook University
- Scientific career
- Fields: Physics, Nuclear Physics
- Workplaces: Lawrence Berkeley National Laboratory; Yale University
- Doctoral advisor: Robert L. McGrath
- Other academic advisors: Peter Paul, Peter Wurm, Linwood Lee, Peter Braun-Munzinger, Lee Schroeder, Reinhard Stock

John William Harris (born March 14, 1950) is an American experimental high energy nuclear physicist and D. Allan Bromley Emeritus Professor in the Physics Department at Yale University. His research interests are focused on understanding high energy density QCD and the quark–gluon plasma created in relativistic collisions of heavy ions. Dr. Harris collaborated on the original proposal to initiate a high energy heavy-ion program at CERN in Geneva, Switzerland, has been actively involved in the ALICE experiment in the heavy-ion program at the CERN LHC, and was the founding spokesperson for the STAR collaboration at RHIC at Brookhaven National Laboratory in the U.S.

== Nuclear Physics Career ==
After obtaining a Bachelor of Science, with Distinction, from the University of Washington, John Harris started his career at the Stony Brook University (then known as State University of New York at Stony Brook), where he completed his Ph.D. in experimental nuclear physics in 1978.

=== Lawrence Berkeley National Laboratory ===
After his Ph.D. Dr. Harris went to Lawrence Berkeley National Laboratory (LBNL) in Berkeley, California, to conduct his post-doctoral work in high-energy nuclear physics from 1978 to 1979. After working as a senior guest scientist at the Gesellschaft für Schwerionenforschung in Darmstadt, Germany, from 1980 to 1984, he returned to LBNL in 1984 and was appointed divisional fellow in the Nuclear Science Division. He became staff senior scientist in 1989 and served in this role until 1995. During his time at LBNL he was a collaborator in the NA35 experiment at CERN (1985–1991), spokesperson of the BEVALAC CCD-Streamer Chamber Experiments at LBL (1986–1990), CERN NA35 Project Leader in Nuclear Science Division at LBL (1990–1991), RHIC project leader in Nuclear Science Division at LBL and deputy program head of the Relativistic Nuclear Collisions Program (1990–1996). His most significant work from this period focused on compression effects in nucleus-nucleus collisions, the nuclear matter equation of state and pion production in high energy nucleus-nucleus collisions, and on directed and elliptic flow in Pb+Pb collisions at the CERN SPS.

=== Yale University ===
In 1996, Harris joined the faculty of Yale University in New Haven, Connecticut, as a tenured professor of physics. At Yale he served as director of the Wright Nuclear Structure Laboratory (2008–2010), in the Yale Science Council (2005–2015, as chair 2008–2015), and in the inaugural Yale Faculty Senate (2015–2017). Harris has served in the physics department as director of graduate studies (1998–1999), director of undergraduate studies (2013-2016), associate physics department chair (2016–2019) and director of postdoctoral affairs in physics (2007–2020).

=== STAR Collaboration ===
The STAR collaboration, which is carrying out experiments at the Relativistic Heavy Ion Collider (RHIC) at Brookhaven National Laboratory on Long Island, New York, was founded in 1991, and Harris served as its founding spokesperson from 1991 to 2002. He also served as the acting project manager from 1991 to 1992. At present, he is still a member of this collaboration. Among the most important discoveries by the STAR collaboration is the "perfect liquid" formed in relativistic heavy-ion collisions at RHIC.

=== ALICE Collaboration ===
Dr. Harris joined the ALICE (A Large Ion Collider Experiment) collaboration at the CERN Large Hadron Collider in 2006 and became the national coordinator for the ALICE-USA Collaboration (2006-2012). In ALICE he served on the Physics Board (2009–2016), Management Board (2011-2019), Collaboration Board (2007-2025, and as its deputy chair 2011-2016 and chair 2016-2019). He serves as an elected board member of the ALICE Management Board (2024-2026).

=== Service to the Nuclear Physics Community ===
- Associate Editor of Nuclear Physics (Intermediate Energy), 1991–1995
- Member of the U.S. Nuclear Science Advisory Committee (NSAC), 1993–1996
- Member of the US LHC Users Association Executive Committee, 2014-2015
- Chair of New RHIC Detector (sPHENIX) Inaugural Institutional Board, 2015
- Nuclear and Particle Physics Program Advisory Committee, Brookhaven National Laboratory, member 2014-2020, Chair 2016-2023
- Member of the organizing committees of the annual Winter Workshop on Nuclear Dynamics, since 1992.
- Public science outreach activities

== Honors ==
Dr. Harris received the Nuclear Science Divisional Fellowship, Lawrence Berkeley Laboratory, U.C. Berkeley, in 1984, the Alexander von Humboldt Fellowship of the Federal Republic of Germany in 1986, and the Lawrence Berkeley Laboratory Performance Achievement Award in 1993. Harris was awarded the Alexander-von-Humboldt Foundation Distinguished Senior U.S. Scientist Award (Humboldt Prize, Humboldt-Forschungspreis für Naturwissenschafler aus den USA) in 1994. He was elected Fellow of the American Physical Society in 1996. In 2002, on the occasion of the 40th Anniversary of Stony Brook University, he was designated a Top 40 Distinguished Alumni. In 2007 Dr. Harris presented the Robert Hofstadter Endowed Lectures at Stanford University. He received the 2024 Mentoring Award from the Division of Nuclear Physics of the American Physical Society.

== Scientific Publications ==
- Dr. Harris' list of publications at Google Scholar

== Textbooks ==
- Harris, J.W.; Stöcker, H. (1998). Handbook of Mathematics and Computational Science. Springer - New York.
- Benenson, W.; Harris, J.W.; Stöcker, H. (2002). Handbook of Physics. Springer - New York.
