= Breit–Wheeler process =

Electron-positron production from two photons

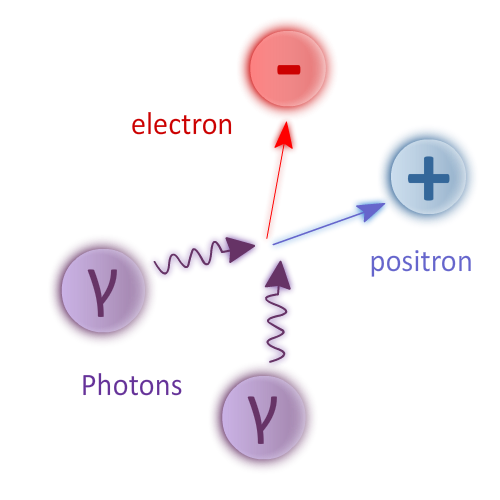
The Breit–Wheeler process is the creation of an electron–positron pair following the collision of two high-energy photons (gamma photons).

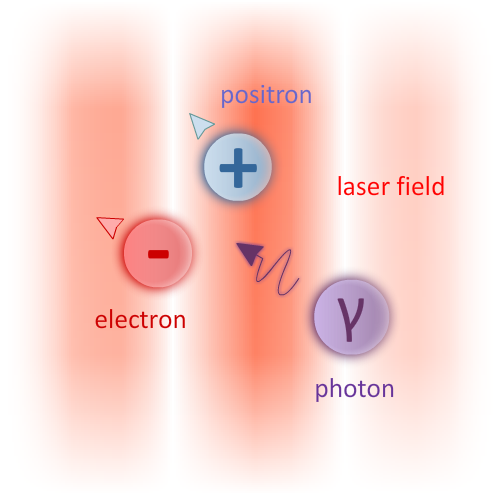
The nonlinear Breit–Wheeler process or multiphoton Breit–Wheeler is the creation of an electron-positron pair from the decay of a high-energy photon (gamma photon) interacting with a strong electromagnetic field such as a laser.

The Breit–Wheeler process or Breit–Wheeler pair production is a proposed physical process in which a positron–electron pair is created from the collision of two photons. It is the simplest mechanism by which pure light can be potentially transformed into matter. The process can take the form γ γ′ → e^{+} e^{−} where γ and γ′ are two light quanta (for example, gamma photons).

The multiphoton Breit–Wheeler process, also referred to as nonlinear Breit–Wheeler or strong field Breit–Wheeler in the literature, occurs when a high-energy probe photon decays into pairs propagating through a strong electromagnetic field (for example, a laser pulse). In contrast with the linear process, this can take the form of γ + n ω → e^{+} e^{−}, where n represents the number of photons, and ω represents the coherent laser field.

The inverse process, e^{+} e^{−} → γ γ′, in which an electron and a positron collide and annihilate to generate a pair of gamma photons, is known as electron–positron annihilation or the Dirac process for the name of the physicist who first described it theoretically and anticipated the Breit–Wheeler process.

This mechanism is theoretically characterized by a very weak probability, so producing a significant number of pairs requires two extremely bright, collimated sources of photons having photon energy close to or above the electron and positron rest mass energy. Manufacturing such a source, for instance, a gamma-ray laser, is still a technological challenge. In many experimental configurations, pure Breit–Wheeler is dominated by other more efficient pair creation processes that screen pairs produced via this mechanism. The Dirac process (pair annihilation) has, on the other hand, been extensively verified. This is also the case for the multi-photon Breit–Wheeler, which was observed at the Stanford Linear Accelerator Center in 1997 by colliding gamma rays produced by high-energy electrons with a counter-propagating terawatt laser pulse.

Although this mechanism is still one of the most difficult to be observed experimentally on Earth, it is of considerable importance for the absorption of high-energy photons travelling cosmic distances.

The photon–photon and the multiphoton Breit–Wheeler processes are described theoretically by the theory of quantum electrodynamics.

== History ==
The photon–photon Breit–Wheeler process was described theoretically by Gregory Breit and John A. Wheeler in 1934 in Physical Review. It followed previous theoretical work of Paul Dirac on antimatter and pair annihilation. In 1928, Paul Dirac's work proposed that electrons could have positive and negative energy states following the framework of relativistic quantum theory but did not explicitly predict the existence of a new particle.

== Experimental observations ==
=== Photon–photon Breit–Wheeler possible experimental configurations ===
Although the process is one of the manifestations of the mass–energy equivalence, as of 2017, the pure Breit–Wheeler has never been observed in practice because of the difficulty in preparing colliding gamma ray beams and the very weak probability of this mechanism. Recently, different teams have proposed novel theoretical studies on possible experimental configurations to finally observe it on Earth.

In 2014, physicists at Imperial College London proposed a relatively simple way to physically demonstrate the Breit–Wheeler process. The collider experiment that the physicists proposed involves two key steps. First, they would use an extremely powerful high-intensity laser to accelerate electrons to nearly the speed of light. They would then fire these electrons into a slab of gold to create a beam of photons a billion times more energetic than those of visible light. The next stage of the experiment involves a tiny gold can called a hohlraum (German for 'empty room' or 'cavity'). Scientists would fire a high-energy laser at the inner surface of this hohlraum to create a thermal radiation field. They would then direct the photon beam from the first stage of the experiment through the centre of the hohlraum, causing the photons from the two sources to collide and form electrons and positrons. It would then be possible to detect the formation of the electrons and positrons when they exited the can. Monte Carlo simulations suggest that this technique is capable of producing of the order of 10^{5} Breit–Wheeler pairs in a single shot.

In 2016, a second novel experimental setup was proposed theoretically to demonstrate and study the Breit–Wheeler process by colliding two high-energy photon sources (composed of non-coherent hard x-ray and gamma-ray photons) generated from the interaction of two extremely intense lasers on solid thin foils or gas jets. The forthcoming short-pulse extremely intense lasers, laser interaction with solid target will be the place of strong radiative effects driven by the nonlinear inverse quantum scattering. This effect, negligible so far, will become a dominant cooling mechanism for the extremely relativistic electrons accelerated above the 100 MeV level at the laser-solid interface via different mechanisms.

=== Multiphoton Breit–Wheeler experiments ===
The multiphoton Breit–Wheeler process has already been observed and studied experimentally. One of the most efficient configurations to maximize the multiphoton Breit–Wheeler pair production consists of colliding head-on gamma photons with a counter-propagating (or with a slight collision angle, the co-propagating configuration being the less efficient configuration) ultra-high intensity laser pulse. To first create the photons and then have the pair production in an all-in-one setup, a similar configuration can be used by colliding GeV electrons. Depending on the laser intensity, these electrons will first radiate gamma photons via so-called non-linear inverse Compton scattering when interacting with the laser pulse. Still interacting with the laser, these photons then turn into multiphoton Breit–Wheeler electron–positron pairs.

This method was used in 1997 at the Stanford Linear Accelerator Center. Researchers were able to conduct the multi-photon Breit–Wheeler process using electrons to first create high-energy photons, which then underwent multiple collisions to produce electrons and positrons, all within the same chamber. Electrons were accelerated in the linear accelerator to an energy of 46.6 GeV before being sent head-on into a Neodymium (Nd:glass) linear polarized laser of intensity 10^{18} W/cm^{2} (maximal electric field amplitude of around 6×10^{9} V/m), of wavelength 527 nanometers and duration 1.6 picoseconds. In this configuration, it has been estimated that photons of energy up to 29 GeV were generated. This led to the yield of 106 ±14 positrons with a broad energy spectrum in the GeV level (peak around 13 GeV).

The aforementioned experiment may be reproduced in the future at SLAC with more powerful laser technologies. The use of higher laser intensities (10^{20} W/cm^{2}) is now easily achievable with short-pulse titanium-sapphire laser solutions that would significantly enhance process efficiencies (inverse nonlinear Compton and nonlinear Breit–Wheeler pair creation) leading to several orders of magnitude higher antimatter production, enabling higher-resolution measurements, additional mass-shift, as well as nonlinear and spin effects.

The extreme intensities expected to be available in future multi-petawatt laser systems will allow all-optical, laser–electron collision experiments where the electron beam is generated from direct laser interaction with a gas jet in a so-called laser wakefield acceleration regime. The resulting electron bunch is then made to interact with a second high-power laser in order to study QED processes. The feasibility of an all-optical multi-photon Breit–Wheeler pair production scheme has first been proposed theoretically in Implementation of this scheme is restricted to multi-beam short-pulse extreme-intensity laser facilities such as the CILEX-Apollon and ELI systems (CPA titanium sapphire technology at 0.8 micrometer, duration of 15–30 femtoseconds). The generation of electron beams of few GeV and few nanocoulomb is possible with a first laser of 1 petawatt combined with the use of tuned and optimized gas-jet density profiles such as two-step profiles. Strong pair generation can be achieved by colliding head-on this electron beam with a second laser of intensity above 10^{22} W/cm^{2}. In this configuration at this level of intensity, theoretical studies predict that several hundreds of pico-Coulombs of antimatter could be produced. This experimental setup could even be one of the most prolific positron yield factory. This all-optical scenario may be preliminary tested with lower laser intensities of the order of 10^{21} W/cm^{2}.

In July 2021 evidence consistent with the process was reported by the STAR detector one of the four experiments at the Relativistic Heavy Ion Collider although it was unclear if it was due to massless photons or massive virtual photons, vacuum birefringence was also studied obtaining evidence enough to claim the first known observation of the process.

== See also ==
- Two-photon physics
