= Olga Evdokimov =

Russian physicist

- Education: Ivanovo State University
- Scientific career
- Fields: Nuclear Physics
- Thesis: Alignment and Fast Algorithms of Data Treatment for 4π-geometry Detectors (1999)
- Website: https://phys.uic.edu/profiles/evdokimov-olga/

Olga Evdokimov is a Russian born professor of physics at the University of Illinois, Chicago (UIC). She is a High Energy Nuclear Physicist, who currently collaborates on two international experiments; the Solenoidal Tracker At RHIC (STAR) experiment at the Relativistic Heavy Ion Collider (RHIC), Brookhaven National Laboratory, Upton, New York and the Compact Muon Solenoid (CMS) experiment at the LHC (Large Hadron Collider), CERN, Geneva, Switzerland.

== Education ==
Evdokimov obtained both her MS in theoretical physics in 1996 and her Ph.D. in Physical & Mathematical Sciences in 1999 from the Ivanovo State University, Ivanovo, Russia. She performed her Ph.D. research at Laboratory for High Energy Physics at Joint Institute for Nuclear Research, Dubna, Russia. Her thesis was titled "Alignment and Fast Algorithms of Data Treatment for 4π-geometry Detectors."

== Career ==
Evdokimov worked first as a postdoctoral researcher at Purdue University. In 2005 she joined UIC as an adjunct assistant professor, in 2006 she became an assistant professor. She was promoted to associate professor in 2010 before becoming full professor in 2015. In 2013 she received a Teaching Recognition Award from UIC's Council for Excellence in Teaching and Learning (CETL).

Evdokimov has served on a number of key management positions of the STAR collaboration. She was STAR's Spectra Physics Working Group convener for four years. From 2008 to 2011 she served as one of the deputy spokespeople. In August 2016 she was elected as the chair of the Institutional Council of the STAR collaboration; she was reelected in 2018 for a second two-year term. In CMS she has been on the Heavy-Ion Publication Committee.

Evdokimov is an active member of the physics community. She has served as an elected member of the RHIC/AGS Users' executive committee (2013-2016), on the Executive Committee for the NERSC (National Energy Research Scientific Computing Center) Users Group, and in 2018 she was appointed to the U.S. DOE/NSF Nuclear Science Advisory Committee (NSAC). NSAC provides advice on the nations program for basic nuclear science research. DoE and NSF share the responsibility for selecting NSAC's members.

In 2017 she co-chaired the international conference on ultra-relativistic heavy-ion collisions (Quark Matter 2017) conference which took place from February 5–11 in Chicago and was co-editor of Volume 967 of Nuclear Physics A which reported on the results presented at this conference.

== Research interests ==
Evdokimov's research focuses on understanding the properties and evolution of QCD matter under the extreme temperatures and energy densities achieved in ultra-relativistic heavy ion collisions. The form of matter created in such collisions is termed the quark gluon plasma (QGP). She is an experimental nuclear physicist and a member of two large international collaborations: the STAR experiment at the Relativistic Heavy Ion Collider (RHIC) and the CMS experiment at the Large Hadron Collider (LHC).

Evdokimov is co-author of over 1000 journal publications and has an h-index of 157. Her specific research has contributed to the understanding of bulk identified particle production in the QGP, and their subsequent collective motion, the baryon enhancement puzzle, and studies of jet production and jet-medium interactions, and techniques for probing jet quenching via multi-particle correlations.

She is a co-convener of one of the four physics working groups leading the effort to organize the physics studies and detector design concepts in preparation for the realization of the Electron Ion Collider (EIC).
