= 4U 0142+61 =

Pulsar in the constellation Cassiopeia

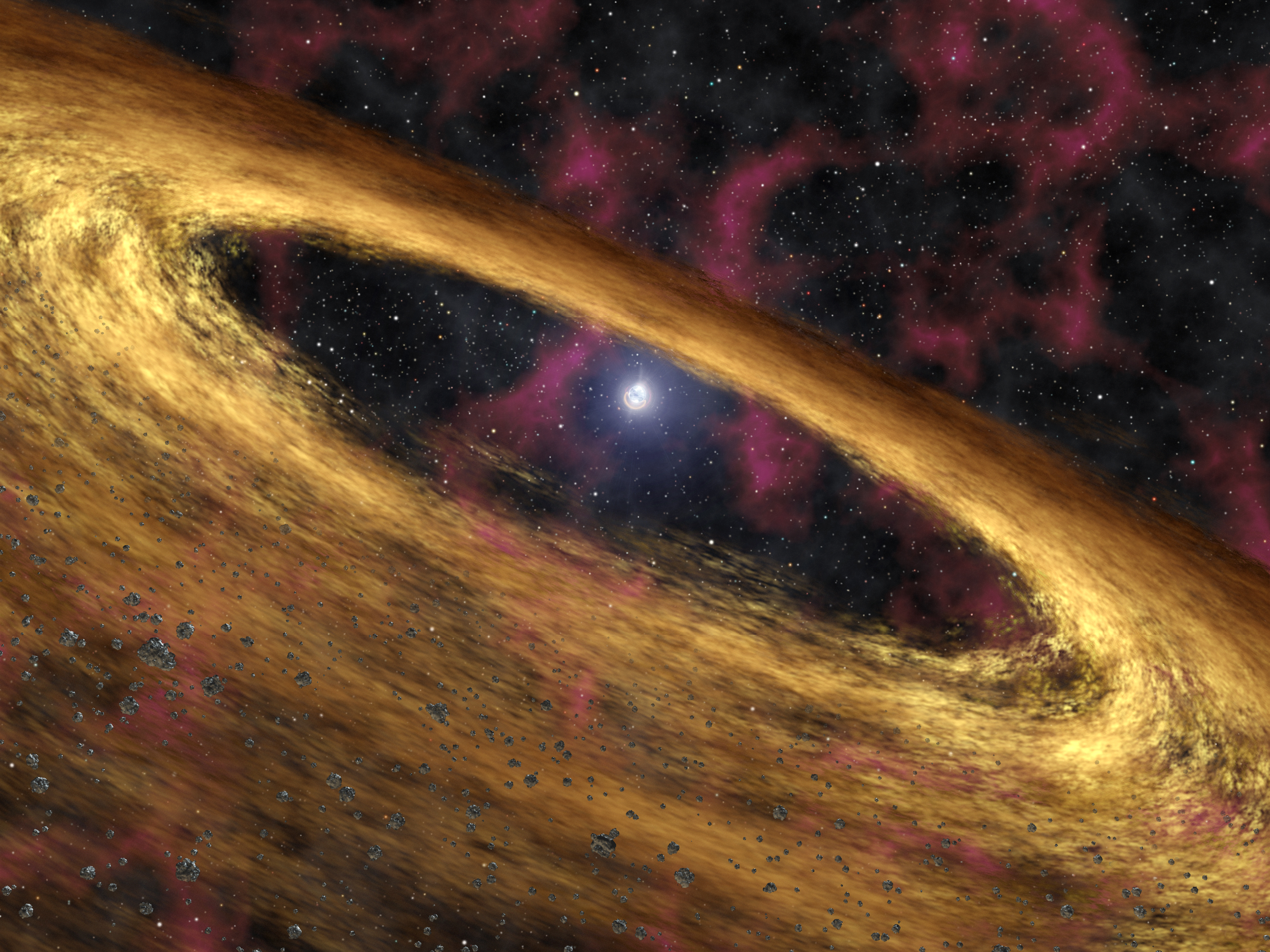
- Artist's conception of 4U 0142+61

Observation data Epoch J2000 Equinox J2000
- Constellation: Cassiopeia
- Right ascension: 01^{h} 46^{m} 22.41^{s}
- Declination: +61° 45′ 03.2″
- Apparent magnitude (V): 25.62

Characteristics
- B−V color index: 0.63
- Variable type: Suspected

Astrometry
Proper motion (μ)	RA: 26.58958 mas/yr Dec.: +61.75264 mas/yr

Details
Radius	16.1 km R_{☉}
Luminosity	0.63 L_{☉}
Rotation	8.68832905 s

Other designations
- PSR J0146+61, 1RXS J014621.5+614509

Database references
SIMBAD	data

4U 0142+61 is a magnetar at an approximate distance of 13000 light-years from Earth, located in the constellation Cassiopeia.

In an article published in Nature on April 6, 2006, Deepto Chakrabarty et al. of MIT revealed that a circumstellar disk was discovered around the pulsar. This may prove that pulsar planets are common around neutron stars. The debris disk is likely to be composed of mainly heavier metals. The star had undergone a supernova event approximately 100,000 years ago. The disk orbits about 1.6 million kilometers away from the pulsar and probably contains about 10 Earth-masses of material. This also marks the first time that a pulsar has been discovered with a debris disk orbiting it.

In May 2022, the first study of this source by the IXPE space observatory hinted at the possibility of vacuum birefringence on 4U 0142+61. This same study using IXPE also reported that the star may have a solid surface, with no atmosphere.
