= Dmitri Kharzeev =

American theoretical physicist

Dmitri Eduardovich Kharzeev (Russian: Дмитрий Эдуардович Харзе́ев; born September 6, 1963) is an American theoretical physicist most notable for his work on the chiral magnetic effect.

== Personal life ==
Dmitri Kharzeev received his PhD in quantum field theory from Moscow State University in Russia. He works in nuclear physics, condensed matter physics, quantum information, and cosmology, with the idea that each of these fields overlaps and intertwine. In this way, he is able to summarize all of his research as working toward finding connections between seemingly drastically different phenomena.

Dmitri Kharzeev spent 7 years doing research and teaching in Europe, including 3 years at the National Institute of Nuclear Physics in Italy, 3 years at CERN in Geneva, and 1 year University of Bielefeld in Germany.

Dmitri Kharzeev moved to the United States in 1997 when Nobel Laureate T.D. Lee, along with Akito Arima offered him a position as a fellow at their newly founded research institute at Brookhaven National Laboratory. Kharzeev became the first employee of the institute when he told Lee and Arima that his wife was due with their daughter at the same time the position opened, so they either had to hire him early, or wait until after the baby was born and ready to travel. At this, Arima and Lee offered for Kharzeev to come before the research institute was functioning, making him the first employee of the institute and his daughter the first US citizen of the family.

== Career ==
He is currently a Distinguished Professor and Director of Center for Nuclear Theory at Stony Brook University.

Kharzeev held a position of scientist at Brookhaven National Laboratory until he was appointed head of the Nuclear Theory group and named senior scientist at Brookhaven National Laboratory in 2004.

In 2010 he was offered a professor position at Stony Brook University, and in 2018 earned the title of Distinguished professor. Throughout that time, he was named the director of the Center for Quantum Materials at Stony Brook in 2013, and the director for the Center for Nuclear Theory at Stony Brook University in 2020.

He also spent 5 years as an adjunct professor at Yale University (2007-2012).

In 2026, Kharzeev joined the University of Connecticut's College of Liberal Arts and Sciences as a professor of physics and to lead UConn's Quantum Alliance, an interdisciplinary effort to push forward with Quantum computing research and development in the state.

His visiting or guest positions are listed below:

- 2018: Guest Scientist, Program Organizer, NORDITA and University of Stockholm, Sweden
- 2018, 2019: Le Studium professor, Loire Valley Institute for Advanced Studies, France
- 2017: Visiting professor, Universita degli Studi di Firenze, Italy
- 2015, 2019: Severo Ochoa Distinguished Visiting Professor, Universidad Autonoma de Madrid, Spain
- 2014: Senior Humboldt Fellow, Goethe University, Frankfurt am Main, Germany
- 2008: Guest Scientist, Program organizer, Institute for Nuclear Theory, Seattle, WA
- 2002: Guest Scientist, Program organizer, Kavli Institute for Theoretical Physics, Santa Barbara, CA
- 2001: CNRS Fellow, Universite de Pierre et Marie Curie (Paris VI), France

== Noteworthy achievements ==
Dmitri Kharzeev discovered that if you put a system of chirally imbalanced, charged particles in a magnetic field, it will generate a magnetic current, a phenomenon unseen before which he called the Chiral magnetic effect.

He found that this phenomenon exists only at the quantum level, because it exceeds Maxwell's equations, which express that there is not current that can run parallel with the magnetic field. While a microscopic phenomenon, it can cause macroscopic effects, including superconductors measuring current and superfluidity. Kharzeev predicted this phenomenon theoretically and wrote a paper about it in 2004 before beginning experimentation.

Kharzeev has received patents for two equipment designs: Graphene-magnet multilayers as a base for nano-scale spintronic devices (2013) and Chiral Qubit: system and method (2020). Both of these relate to his most prevalent work with chirality and magnetism, which is also the work that earned him the Humboldt prize in 2013. He is also well-written and cited, with the following publications:

- Papers in referred journals: >250
- Citations (Google Scholar): >26,000
- H-Index (Google Scholar): 72
- Citations (Inspire): >22,000
- H-Index (Inspire): 70
- Citations (Web of Science): >15,000
- H-Index (Web of Science): 61

== Awards ==
- 2021: Elected Foreign member of Academia Europaea
- 2018: Distinguished Professor, State University of New York
- 2018: Member, State University of New York Academy
- 2018–present: Le Studium Professor, Le Studium Foundation, France
- 2017: Chancellor's Award for Excellence in Scholarship, State University of New York
- 2014: Severo Ochoa Distinguished Visiting Professor, Universidad Autonoma de Madrid
- 2013: Humboldt Prize, Alexander von Humboldt Foundation
- 2012: Distinguished Founding Faculty Fellow, Skoltech/MIT
- 2010: Fellow, American Association for the Advancement of Science
- 2006: Fellow, American Physical Society
- 2005: Sackler Fellow
- 2005: Distinguished Scholar, Emilio Segre
- 2001: Fellow, CNRS
- 1997: Fellow, RIKEN-BNL
- 1986: Winner, USSR Competition in Physics for students
