= Non-linear inverse Compton scattering =

Electron-many photon scattering

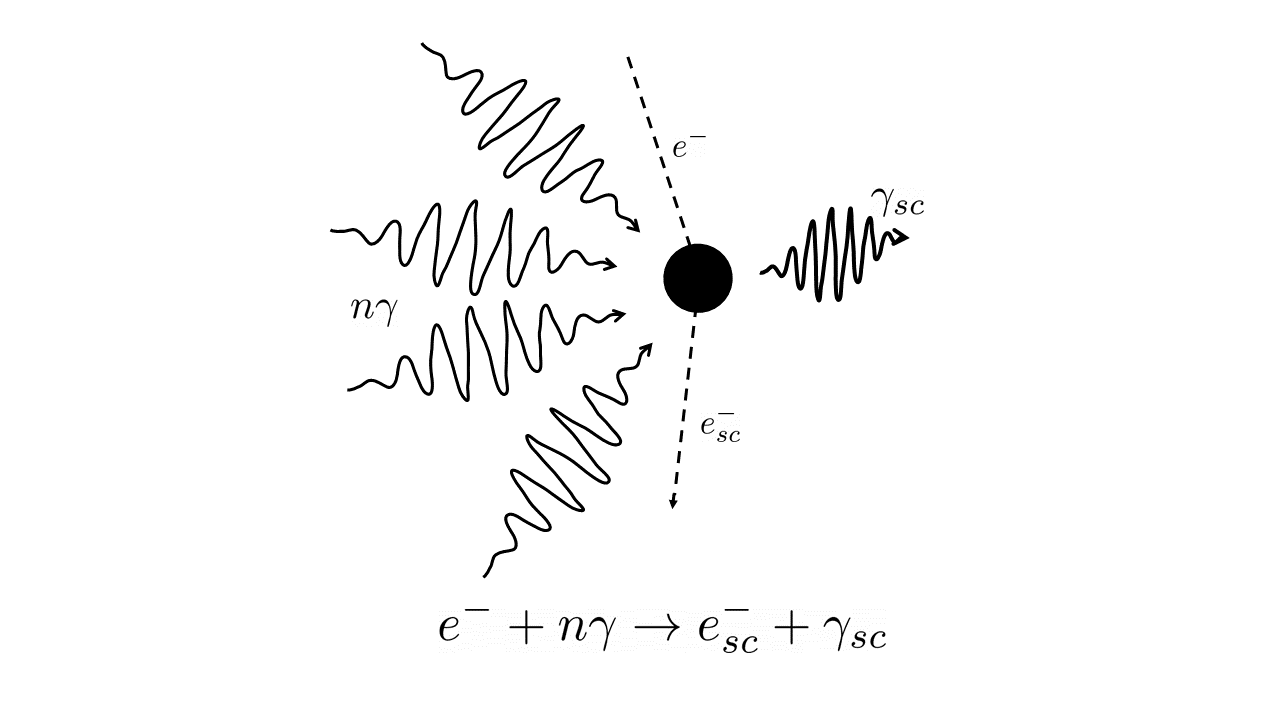
Picture of non-linear inverse Compton scattering.

Non-linear inverse Compton scattering (NICS), also known as non-linear Compton scattering and multiphoton Compton scattering, is the scattering of multiple low-energy photons, given by an intense electromagnetic field, in a high-energy photon (X-ray or gamma ray) during the interaction with a charged particle, in many cases an electron. This process is an inverted variant of Compton scattering since, contrary to it, the charged particle transfers its energy to the outgoing high-energy photon instead of receiving energy from an incoming high-energy photon. Furthermore, differently from Compton scattering, this process is explicitly non-linear because the conditions for multiphoton absorption by the charged particle are reached in the presence of a very intense electromagnetic field, for example, the one produced by high-intensity lasers.

Non-linear inverse Compton scattering is a scattering process belonging to the category of light–matter interaction phenomena. The absorption of multiple photons of the electromagnetic field by the charged particle causes the consequent emission of an X-ray or a gamma ray with energy comparable or higher with respect to the charged particle rest energy.

The normalized vector potential ${a_0=eA/(m c^2)}$ helps to isolate the regime in which non-linear inverse Compton scattering occurs ($e$ is the electron charge, $m$ is the electron mass, $c$ the speed of light and $A$ the vector potential). If $a_0\ll1$, the emission phenomenon can be reduced to the scattering of a single photon by an electron, which is the case of inverse Compton scattering. While, if $a_0\gg1$, NICS occurs and the probability amplitudes of emission have non-linear dependencies on the field. For this reason, in the description of non-linear inverse Compton scattering, $a_0$ is called classical non-linearity parameter.

== History ==
The physical process of non-linear inverse Compton scattering has been first introduced theoretically in different scientific articles starting from 1964. Before this date, some seminal works had emerged dealing with the description of the classical limit of NICS, called non-linear Thomson scattering or multiphoton Thomson scattering. In 1964, different papers were published on the topic of electron scattering in intense electromagnetic fields by L. S. Brown and T. W. B. Kibble, and by A. I. Nikishov and V. I. Ritus, among the others. The development of the high-intensity laser systems required to study the phenomenon has motivated the continuous advancements in the theoretical and experimental studies of NICS. At the time of the first theoretical studies, the terms non-linear (inverse) Compton scattering and multiphoton Compton scattering were not in use yet and they progressively emerged in later works. The case of an electron scattering off high-energy photons in the field of a monochromatic background plane wave with either circular or linear polarization was one of the most studied topics at the beginning. Then, some groups have studied more complicated non-linear inverse Compton scattering scenario, considering complex electromagnetic fields of finite spatial and temporal extension, typical of laser pulses.

The advent of laser amplification techniques and in particular of chirped pulse amplification (CPA) has allowed to reach sufficiently high-laser intensities to study new regimes of light–matter interaction and to significantly observe non-linear inverse Compton scattering and its peculiar effects. Non-linear Thomson scattering was first observed in 1983 with $1$ keV electron beam colliding with a Q-switched Nd:YAG laser delivering an intensity of $1.7\cdot 10^{14}$ W/cm^{2} ($a_0=0.01$), photons of frequency two times that of the laser were produced, then in 1995 with a CPA laser of peak intensity around $10^{18}$ W/cm^{2} interacting with neon gas, and in 1998 in the interaction of a mode-locked Nd:YAG laser ($4.4\cdot 10^{18}$ W/cm^{2}, $a_0=1.88$) with plasma electrons from a helium gas jet, producing multiple harmonics of the laser frequency. NICS was detected for the first time in a pioneering experiment at the SLAC National Accelerator Laboratory at Stanford University, USA. In this experiment, the collision of an ultra-relativistic electron beam, with energy of about $46.6$ GeV, with a terawatt Nd:glass laser, with an intensity of $10^{18}$ W/cm^{2} ($a_0=0.8$, $\chi=0.3$), produced NICS photons which were observed indirectly via a nonlinear energy shift in the spectrum of electrons in output; consequent positron generation was also observed in this experiment.

Multiple experiments have been then performed by crossing a high-energy laser pulse with a relativistic electron beam from a conventional linear electron accelerator, but a further achievement in the study of non-linear inverse Compton scattering has been achieved with the realization of all-optical setups. In these cases, a laser pulse is both responsible for the electron acceleration, through the mechanisms of plasma acceleration, and for the non-linear inverse Compton scattering occurring in the interaction of accelerated electrons with a laser pulse (possibly counter-propagating with respect to electrons). One of the first experiment of this type was made in 2006 producing photons of energy from $0.4$ to $2$ keV with a Ti:Sa laser beam ($2\cdot 10^{19}$W/cm^{2}). Research is still ongoing and active in this field as attested by the numerous theoretical and experimental publications.

== Classical limit ==
The classical limit of non-linear inverse Compton scattering, also called non-linear Thomson scattering and multiphoton Thomson scattering, is a special case of classical synchrotron emission driven by the force exerted on a charged particle by intense electric and magnetic fields. Practically, a moving charge emits electromagnetic radiation while experiencing the Lorentz force induced by the presence of these electromagnetic fields. The calculation of the emitted spectrum in this classical case is based on the solution of the Lorentz equation for the particle and the substitution of the corresponding particle trajectory in the Liénard-Wiechert fields. In the following, the considered charged particles will be electrons, and gaussian units will be used.

The component of the Lorentz force perpendicular to the particle velocity is the component responsible for the local radial acceleration and thus of the relevant part of the radiation emission by a relativistic electron of charge $e$, mass $m$ and velocity $\mathbf{v}$. In a simplified picture, one can suppose a local circular trajectory for a relativistic particle and can assume a relativistic centripetal force equal to the magnitude of the perpendicular Lorentz force acting on the particle:
$$\gamma \dfrac{m v^2}{\rho}=e\sqrt{\left(\mathbf{E}+\dfrac{\mathbf{v}}{c}\times\mathbf{B}\right)^2-\left(\dfrac{\mathbf{E}\cdot\mathbf{v}}{v}\right)^2}$$
$\mathbf{E}$ and $\mathbf{B}$ are the electric and magnetic fields respectively, $v$ is the magnitude of the electron velocity and $\gamma$ is the Lorentz factor $\left(1 - v^2/c^2\right)^{-1/2}$. This equation defines a simple dependence of the local radius of curvature on the particle velocity and on the electromagnetic fields felt by the particle. Since the motion of the particle is relativistic, the magnitude $v$ can be substituted with the speed of light to simplify the expression for $\rho$. Given an expression for $\rho$, the model given in Example 1: bending magnet can be used to approximately describe the classical limit of non-linear inverse Compton scattering. Thus, the power distribution in frequency of non-linear Thomson scattering by a relativistic charged particle can be seen as equivalent to the general case of synchrotron emission with the main parameters made explicitly dependent on the particle velocity and on the electromagnetic fields.

== Electron quantum parameter ==
Increasing the intensity of the electromagnetic field and the particle velocity, the emission of photons with energy comparable to the electron one becomes more probable and non-linear inverse Compton scattering starts to progressively differ from the classical limit because of quantum effects such as photon recoil. A dimensionless parameter, called electron quantum parameter, can be introduced to describe how far the physical condition are from the classical limit and how much non-linear and quantum effects matter. This parameter is given by the following expression:

$$\chi=\dfrac{\gamma}{E_s}\sqrt{\left(\mathbf{E}+\dfrac{\mathbf{v}}{c}\times\mathbf{B}\right)^2-\left(\dfrac{\mathbf{E}\cdot\mathbf{v}}{c}\right)^2}$$	1

where $E_s=m^2c^3/(\hbar e)\simeq 1.3 \cdot 10^{18}$ V/m is the Schwinger field. In scientific literature, $\chi$ is also called $\eta$. The Schwinger field $E_s$, appearing in this definition, is a critical field capable of performing on electrons a work of $mc^2$ over a reduced Compton length $\hbar/(m c)$, where $\hbar$ is the reduced Planck constant. The presence of such a strong field implies the instability of vacuum and it is necessary to explore non-linear QED effects, such as the production of pairs from vacuum. The Schwinger field corresponds to an intensity of nearly $10^{29}$ W/cm^{2}. Consequently, $\chi$ represents the work, in units of $mc^2$, performed by the field over the Compton length $\hbar/(m c)$ and in this way it also measures the importance of quantum non-linear effects since it compares the field strength in the rest frame of the electron with that of the critical field. Non-linear quantum effects, like the production of an electron-positron pair in vacuum, occur above the critical field $E_s$, however, they can be observed also well below this limit since ultra-relativistic particles with Lorentz factor equal to $E_s/|\mathbf{E}|$ see fields of the order of $E_s$ in their rest frame. $\chi$ is called also non-linear quantum parameter whereas it is a measure of the magnitude of non-linear quantum effects. The electron quantum parameter is linked to the magnitude of the Lorentz four-force acting on the particle due to the electromagnetic field and it is a Lorentz-invariant:
$$\chi=\dfrac{e \hbar}{m^3 c^4}|F_{\alpha\beta}p^\alpha|$$
The four-force acting on the particle is equal to the derivative of the four-momentum with respect to proper time. Using this fact in the classical limit, the radiated power according to the relativistic generalization of the Larmor formula becomes:
$$P=\dfrac{2}{3}\dfrac{e^2m^2c^3}{\hbar^2}\chi^2$$
As a result, emission is improved by higher values of $\chi$ and, therefore, some considerations can be done on which are the conditions for prolific emission, further evaluating the definition (1). The electron quantum parameter increases with the energy of the electron (direct proportionality to $\gamma$) and it is larger when the force exerted by the field perpendicularly to the particle velocity increases.

=== Plane wave case ===
Considering a plane wave the electron quantum parameter can be rewritten using this relation between electric and magnetic fields:
$$\mathbf{B}=\dfrac{\mathbf{k}\times\mathbf{E}}{k}$$
where $\mathbf{k}$ is the wavevector of the plane wave and $k$ the wavevector magnitude. Inserting this expression in the formula of $\chi$:
$$\chi=\dfrac{\gamma}{E_s}\sqrt{\left(\mathbf{E}+\dfrac{(\mathbf{E}\cdot\mathbf{v})}{c} \dfrac{\mathbf{k}}{k}-\dfrac{(\mathbf{v}\cdot \mathbf{k})}{k c}\mathbf{E}\right)^2-\left(\dfrac{\mathbf{E}\cdot\mathbf{v}}{c}\right)^2}$$
where the vectorial identity $\mathbf{A}\times(\mathbf{B}\times\mathbf{C})=(\mathbf{A}\cdot\mathbf{C})\mathbf{B}-(\mathbf{A}\cdot\mathbf{B})\mathbf{C}$ was used. Elaborating the expression:
$$\chi=\dfrac{\gamma}{E_s}\sqrt{\left[\mathbf{E}\left(1-\dfrac{\mathbf{v}\cdot \mathbf{k}}{k c}\right)\right]^2-2\left(1-\dfrac{\mathbf{v}\cdot \mathbf{k}}{k c}\right)\left(\dfrac{\mathbf{E}\cdot\mathbf{v}}{k c}\right)\mathbf{k}\cdot\mathbf{E}+\left(\dfrac{(\mathbf{E}\cdot\mathbf{v})}{c} \dfrac{\mathbf{k}}{k}\right)^2-\left(\dfrac{\mathbf{E}\cdot\mathbf{v}}{c}\right)^2}$$
Since $\mathbf{k}\cdot\mathbf{E}=0$ for a plane wave and the last two terms under the square root compensate each other, $\chi$ reduces to:
$$\chi=\dfrac{\gamma |\mathbf{E}|}{E_s}\sqrt{\left(1-\dfrac{\mathbf{v}\cdot \mathbf{k}}{k c}\right)^2}$$

In the simplified configuration of a plane wave impinging on the electron, higher values of the electron quantum parameter are obtained when the plane wave is counter-propagating with respect to the electron velocity.

== Quantum effects ==
A full description of non-linear inverse Compton scattering must include some effects related to the quantization of light and matter. The principal ones are listed below.

- Inclusion of the discretization of the emitted radiation, i.e. the introduction of photons with respect to the continuous description of the classical limit. This effect does not change quantitatively the emission features but changes how the emitted radiation is interpreted. A parameter equivalent to $\chi$ can be introduced for the photon of frequency $\omega$ and it is called photon quantum parameter:
  $$\eta=\dfrac{e \hbar^2}{m^3 c^4}|F_{\alpha\beta}k^\alpha|$$
  where $k^\alpha=(\omega/c,\mathbf{k})$ is the photon four-wavevector and $\mathbf{k}$ is the three-dimensional wavevector. In the limit in which the particle approaches the speed of light, the ratio between $\eta$ and $\chi$ is equal to:
  $$\zeta=\dfrac{\eta}{\chi}\simeq\dfrac{\hbar\omega}{\gamma m c^2}$$
  From the Frequency distribution of radiated energy one can get a rate of high-energy photon emission distributed in $\eta$ as a function of $\chi$ and $\eta$ but still valid in the classical limit:

$$\dfrac{d^2N}{d\eta dt}=\dfrac{1}{\zeta \hbar \chi}\dfrac{dP}{d\omega}=\dfrac{\sqrt{3}}{2\pi}\dfrac{e^2 m c}{\hbar^2 }\dfrac{\chi}{\gamma\eta} F(y) \quad \text{where}\quad F(y)=y\int_y^{\infty}K_{\frac{5}{3}}(x)dx\quad\text{and}\quad y=\dfrac{2\eta}{3\chi^2}$$	2

where $K_\alpha$ stands for the McDonald functions. The mean energy of the emitted photon is given by $\langle\hbar\omega\rangle=4\chi \gamma m c^2/(5\sqrt{3})$. Consequently, a large Lorentz factor and intense fields increase the chance of producing high-energy photons. $\zeta$ goes as $\chi$ because of this formula.

- The effect of radiation reaction, due to photon recoil. The electron energy after the interaction process reduces because part of it is delivered to the emitted photon and the maximum energy achievable by the emitted photon cannot be higher than the electron kinetic energy. This effect is not taken into account in non-linear Thomson scattering in which the electron energy is supposed to remain almost unaltered in energy such as in elastic scattering. Quantum radiation reaction effects become important when the emitted photon energy approaches the electron energy. Since $\chi\sim\zeta\sim\hbar \omega/(\gamma m c^2)$ , if $\chi,\zeta\ll1$ the classical limit of NICS is a valid description, while for $\chi,\zeta\sim1$ the energy of the emitted photon is of the order of the electron energy and photon recoil is very relevant.
- The quantization of the motion of the electron and spin effects. An accurate description of non-linear inverse Compton scattering is made considering the electron dynamics described with the Dirac equation in presence of an electromagnetic field.

=== Emission description when $a_0\gg1$ and $\gamma\gg 1$ ===
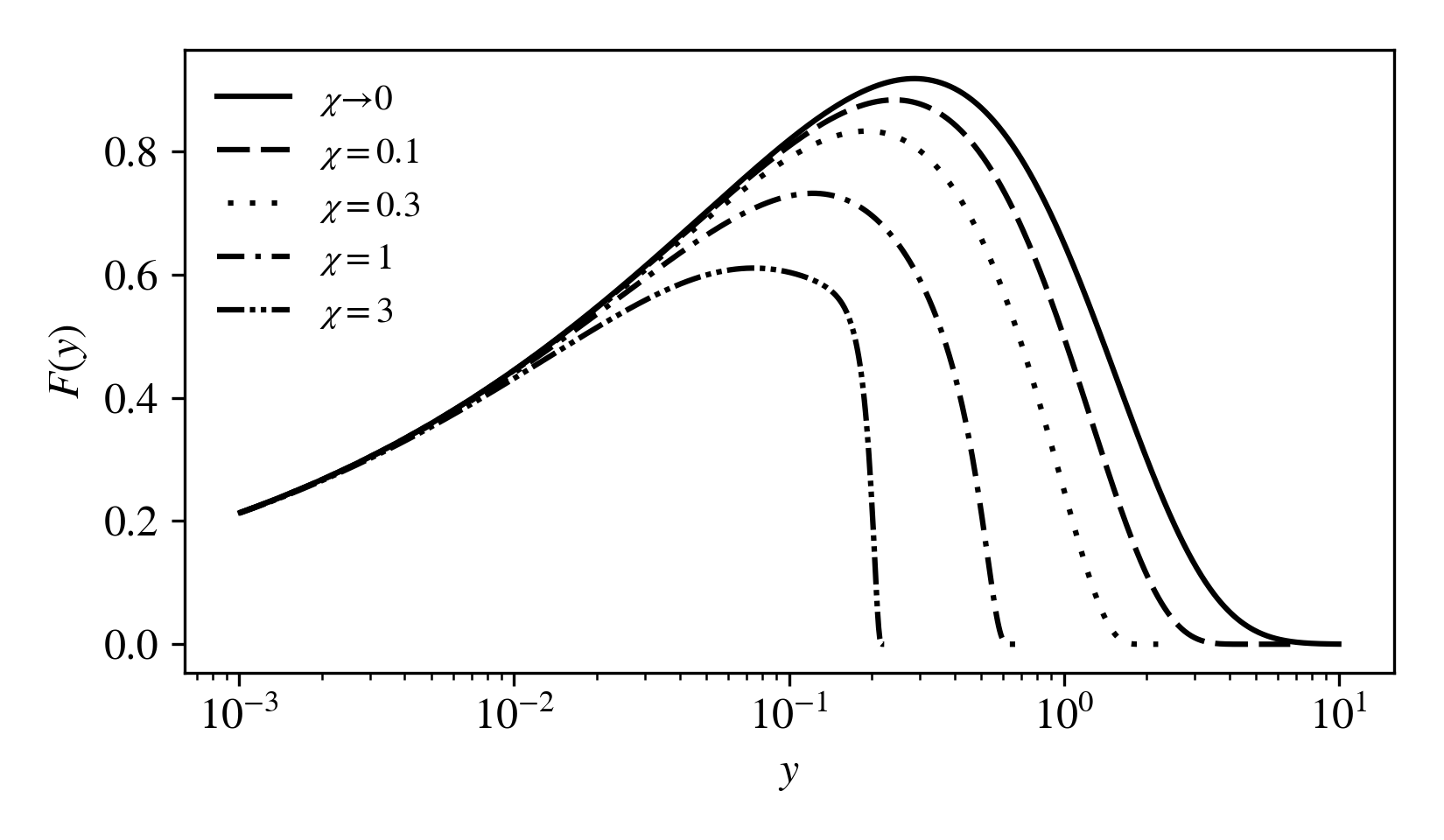
Plots of F(y) for different values of electron quantum parameter $\chi$.

When the incoming field is very intense $a_0\gg1$, the interaction of the electron with the electromagnetic field is completely equivalent to the interaction of the electron with multiple photons, with no need of explicitly quantize the electromagnetic field of the incoming low-energy radiation. While the interaction with the radiation field, i.e. the emitted photon, is treated with perturbation theory: the probability of photon emission is evaluated considering the transition between the states of the electron in presence of the electromagnetic field. This problem has been solved primarily in the case in which electric and magnetic fields are orthogonal and equal in magnitude (crossed field); in particular, the case of a plane electromagnetic wave has been considered. Crossed fields represent in good approximation many existing fields so the found solution can be considered quite general. The spectrum of non-linear inverse Compton scattering, obtained with this approach and valid for $a_0\gg1$ and $\gamma\gg 1$, is:

$$\dfrac{d^2N}{d\eta dt}=\dfrac{\sqrt{3}}{2\pi}\dfrac{q^2 m c}{\hbar^2 }\dfrac{\chi}{\gamma\eta} F(\chi,\eta) \quad \text{where} \quad F(\chi,\eta)=\dfrac{\eta^2}{\chi^2} y K_{\frac{2}{3}}(y)+\left(1-\dfrac{\eta}{\chi}\right)y\int_y^{\infty}K_{\frac{5}{3}}(x)dx$$	3

where the parameter $y$, is now defined as:
$$y=\dfrac{2\eta}{3\chi(\chi-\eta)}=\dfrac{2\zeta}{3\chi(1-\zeta)}$$
The result is similar to the classical one except for the different expression of $F$. For $\chi,\zeta\to0$ it reduces to the classical spectrum (2). Note that if $\zeta\geq1$ ($\eta \geq \chi$ or $y<0$) the spectrum must be zero because the energy of the emitted photon cannot be higher than the electron energy, in particular could not be higher than the electron kinetic energy $(\gamma-1)mc^2$.

The total power emitted in radiation is given by the integration in $\eta$ of the spectrum (3):
$$P=\dfrac{2}{3}\dfrac{e^2m^2c^3}{\hbar^2}\chi^2 g(\chi)$$
where the result of the integration of $F(\chi,\eta)$ is contained in the last term:

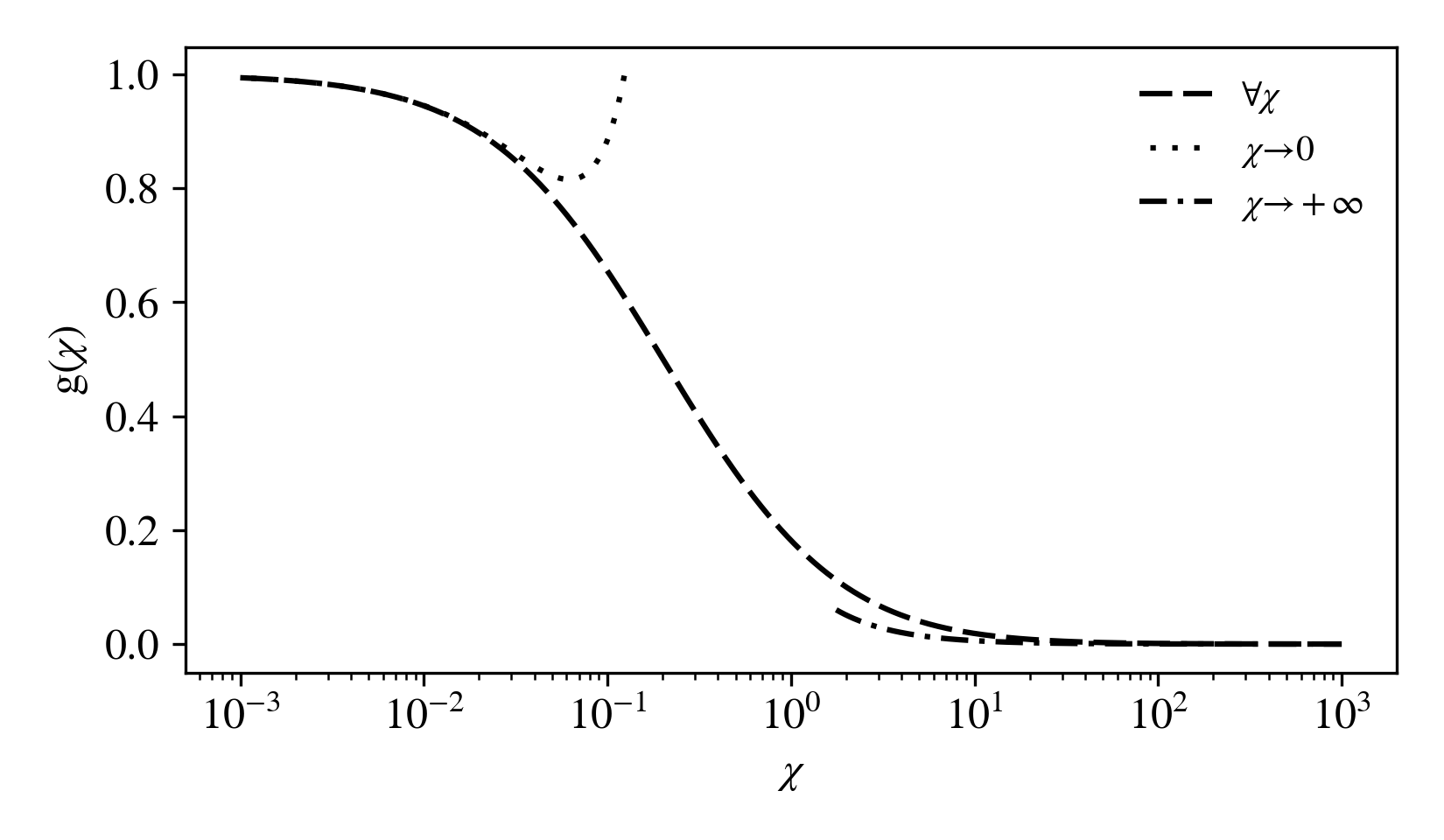
Plot of $g(\chi)$ with the full expression ($\forall \chi$), with the approximated version when $\chi\to 0$, and in the approximation for large values when $\chi\to +\infty$.

$$g(\chi)=\dfrac{3\sqrt{3}}{2\pi \chi^2}\int_0^{+\infty}F(\chi,\eta)d\eta=\dfrac{9\sqrt{3}}{8\pi}\int_0^{+\infty}\left[\dfrac{2y^2K_{\frac{5}{3}}(y)}{(2+3\chi y)^2}+\dfrac{36\chi^2 y^3 K_{\frac{2}{3}}(y)}{2+3\chi y)^4}\right]dy$$
This expression is equal to the classical one if $g(\chi)$ is equal to one and it can be expanded in two limiting cases, near the classical limit and when quantum effects are of major importance:
$$\begin{cases} P\approx \dfrac{2}{3}\dfrac{e^2 m^2 c^3}{\hbar^2}\left(1-\dfrac{55\sqrt{3}}{16}\chi+48\chi^2\right), & \text{for }\chi\ll1 \\ P\approx0.37\dfrac{e^2 m^2 c^3}{\hbar^2}(3\chi)^{\frac{2}{3}}, & \text{for }\chi\gg1  \end{cases}$$
A related quantity is the rate of photon emission:
$$\dfrac{dN}{dt}=\dfrac{\sqrt{3}}{2\pi}\dfrac{q^2 m c}{\hbar^2 }\dfrac{\chi}{\gamma} \int_0^{\chi}\dfrac{F(\chi,\eta)}{\eta}d\eta$$
where it is made explicit that the integration is limited by the condition that if $\eta \geq \chi$ no photons can be produced. This rate of photon emission depends explicitly on electron quantum parameter and on the Lorentz factor for the electron.

== Applications ==
Non-linear inverse Compton scattering is an interesting phenomenon for all applications requiring high-energy photons since NICS is capable of producing photons with energy comparable to $mc^2$ and higher. In the case of electrons, this means that it is possible to produce photons with MeV energy that can consequently trigger other phenomena such as pair production, Breit–Wheeler pair production, Compton scattering, nuclear reactions.

In the context of laser-plasma acceleration, both relativistic electrons and laser pulses of ultra-high intensity can be present, setting favourable conditions for the observation and the exploitation of non-linear inverse Compton scattering for high-energy photon production, for diagnostic of electron motion, and for probing non-linear quantum effects and non-linear QED. Because of this reason, several numerical tools have been introduced to study non-linear inverse Compton scattering. For example, particle-in-cell codes for the study of laser-plasma acceleration have been developed with the capabilities of simulating non-linear inverse Compton scattering with Monte Carlo methods. These tools are used to explore the different regimes of NICS in the context of laser-plasma interaction.

== See also ==
- Compton scattering
- Synchrotron radiation
- Breit–Wheeler process
- Quantum electrodynamics
- Laser
