= STAR detector =

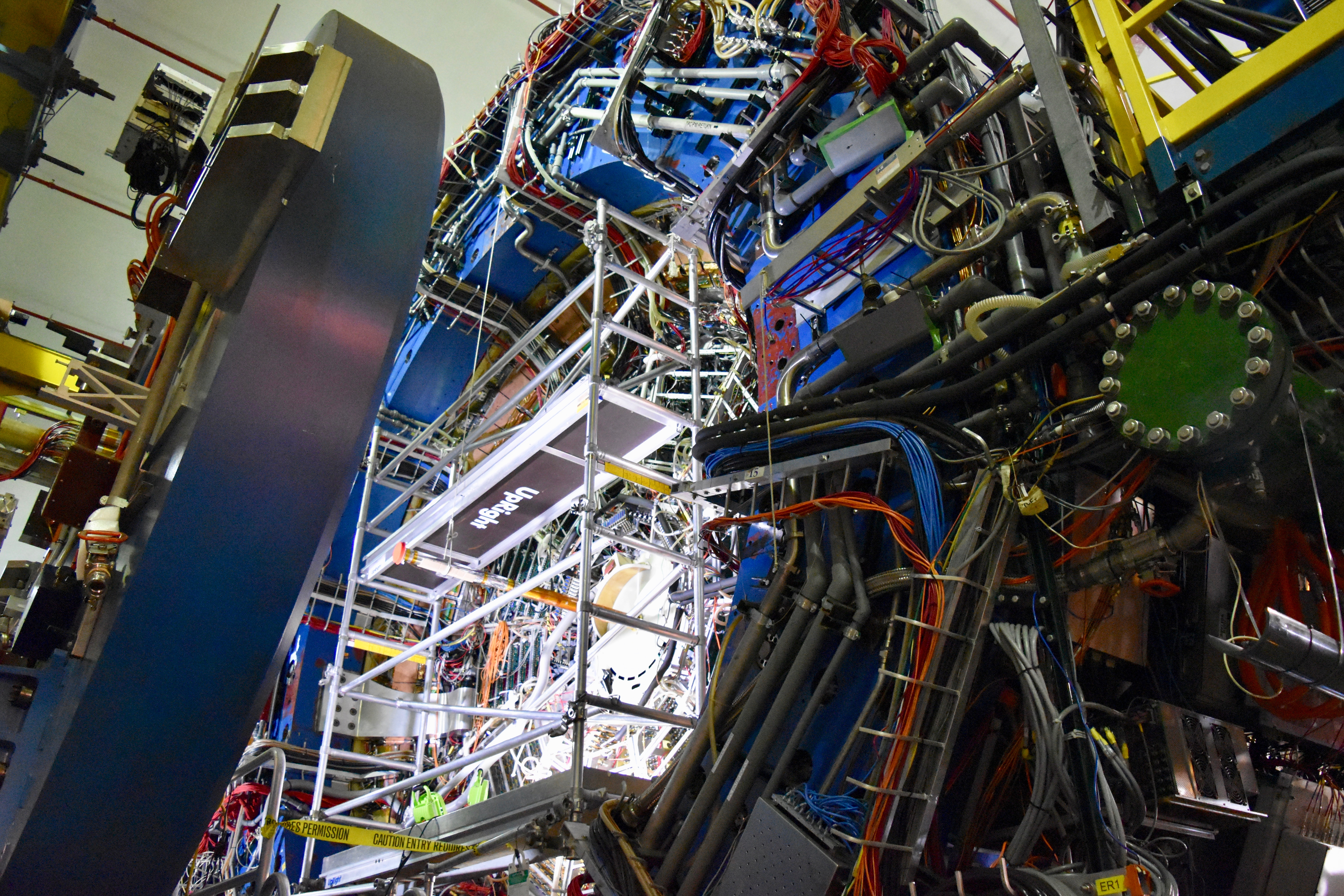
STAR detector

The STAR detector (for Solenoidal Tracker at RHIC) is one of the four experiments at the Relativistic Heavy Ion Collider (RHIC) in Brookhaven National Laboratory, United States.

The primary scientific objective of STAR is to study the formation and characteristics of the quark–gluon plasma (QGP), a state of matter believed to exist at sufficiently high energy densities. Detecting and understanding the QGP allows physicists to understand better the Universe in the seconds after the Big Bang, when the presently-observed symmetries (and asymmetries) of the Universe were established.

Unlike other physics experiments where a theoretical prediction can be tested directly by a single measurement, STAR must make use of a variety of simultaneous studies in order to draw strong conclusions about the QGP. This is due both to the complexity of the system formed in the high-energy nuclear collision and the unexplored landscape of the physics studied. STAR therefore consists of several types of detectors, each specializing in detecting certain types of particles or characterizing their motion. These detectors work together in an advanced data acquisition and subsequent physics analysis that allows definitive statements to be made about the collision.

== The physics of STAR ==
In the immediate aftermath of the Big Bang, the expanding matter was so hot and dense that protons and neutrons could not exist. Instead, the early universe comprised a plasma of quarks and gluons. In today's cool universe, quarks and gluons are confined and exist only within composite particles (bound states) – the hadrons, such as protons and neutrons. Collisions of heavy nuclei at sufficiently high energies allow physicists to study whether quarks and gluons become deconfined at high densities, and if so, what the properties of this matter (i.e. quark–gluon plasma) are.

In particular, STAR studies the collective expansion of the hot quark-gluon matter, such as the elliptic flow. This allows to extract the transport coefficients that characterize the quark-gluon matter, including the shear and bulk viscosity, and to investigate macroscopic quantum phenomena, such as the chiral magnetic effect.

== Collaboration governance ==
The governance of STAR is via two branches: the institutional Council which is run by a Chairperson elected from the Council ranks, and elected Spokesperson(s) and their management team. The Spokesperson(s) represent the Collaboration in scientific, technical, and managerial concerns. The Council deals with general issues that concern the collaboration. Examples include the organization and governance of the Collaboration, adoption of bylaws and amendments thereto, the policy on admission of new members institutions to the Collaboration, and Policies for the Publication and Presentation of STAR Results.

The term of the office of the Council Chair is nominally two years. The Council elects, a Spokesperson or a team of two Spokespersons who then serve at the discretion of the Council. The normal term of office for the Spokesperson(s) is 3 years, and an individual is eligible to serve at most two consecutive terms as Spokesperson(s).

The elected Spokesperson(s) and their team of Deputies, and the Council Chairs of STAR are listed below. The Institute listed indicates the institute the person was at when they held the position.

=== Spokespersons ===
- 2026-present Frank Geurts (Rice)
  - Deputies: Xiaoxuan Chu (BNL), Zebo Tang (USTC), Barbara Trzeciak (CTU)
- 2023-2026 Spokespeople : Frank Geurts (Rice), Lijuan Ruan (BNL)
  - Deputies: ShinIchi Esumi (Tsukuba), Qinghua Xu (Shandong)
- 2020–2023 Spokespeople : Helen Caines (Yale), Lijuan Ruan (BNL)
  - Deputies: Kenneth Barish (UC Riverside), Xin Dong (LBNL)
- 2017–2020 Spokespeople : Helen Caines (Yale), Zhangbu Xu (BNL)
  - Deputies: Jim Drachenberg (ACU), Frank Geurts (Rice)
- 2014–2017 : Zhangbu Xu (BNL)
  - Deputies : Helen Caines (Yale), Renee Fatemi (UTK), Ernst Sichtermann (LBNL)
- 2011–2014 : Nu Xu (LBNL)
  - Deputies: James Dunlop (BNL), Bedangadas Mohanty (VECC/NISER), Scott Wissink (Indiana)
- 2008–2011: Nu Xu (LBNL)
  - Deputies : James Dunlop (BNL), Olga Evdokimov (UIC), Berndt Surrow (MIT)
- 2005–2008 : Tim Hallman (BNL)
  - Deputies : Carl Gagliardi (Texas A&M), Hans Georg Ritter (LBNL), Helen Caines (Yale) (2007 - 2008)
- 2002–2005 : Tim Hallman (BNL)
  - Deputies : Jim Thomas (LBNL), Steven Vigdor (Indiana)
- 1991–2002 : John Harris (Yale)
  - Deputies : Rene Bellwied (Wayne State) (2001-2002), Tim Hallman (BNL) (1999-2000)

=== Council Chairpersons ===
- 2025–present : Kenneth Barish (UC Riverside)
- 2021–2025 : Jana Bielčíková (NPI, CAS)
- 2016–2021 : Olga Evdokimov (UIC)
- 2014–2016 : Huan Huang (UCLA)
- 2009–2014 : Gary Westfall (MSU)
- 2005–2008 : Hank Crawford (UC Berkeley)
- 2003–2005 : Bill Christie (BNL)
- 2000–2003 : Jay Marx (LBNL)

== See also ==
- Breit–Wheeler process
- Vacuum birefringence
