= Chiral magnetic effect =

Macroscopic quantum phenomenon involving electric current

Resistivity increases in a slab of zirconium pentatelluride with the strength of the applied magnetic field for all angles between the current and the field but the angle of 0° when they are parallel: in this configuration of the fields a chiral non-dissipative current appears.

Chiral magnetic effect (CME) is the generation of electric current along an external magnetic field induced by chirality imbalance. Fermions are said to be chiral if they keep a definite projection of spin quantum number on momentum. The CME is a macroscopic quantum phenomenon present in systems with charged chiral fermions, such as the quark–gluon plasma, or Dirac and Weyl semimetals. The CME is a consequence of chiral anomaly in quantum field theory; unlike conventional superconductivity or superfluidity, it does not require a spontaneous symmetry breaking. The chiral magnetic current is non-dissipative, because it is topologically protected: the imbalance between the densities of left-handed and right-handed chiral fermions is linked to the topology of fields in gauge theory by the Atiyah-Singer index theorem.

The experimental observation of CME in a Dirac semimetal, zirconium pentatelluride (ZrTe_{5}), was reported in 2014 by a group from Brookhaven National Laboratory and Stony Brook University. The material showed a conductivity increase in the Lorentz force-free configuration of the parallel magnetic and electric fields.

In 2015, the STAR detector at Brookhaven's Relativistic Heavy Ion Collider and ALICE at CERN presented experimental evidence for the existence of CME in the quark–gluon plasma.

== See also ==
- Euler–Heisenberg Lagrangian
- Chiral anomaly
