= Relativistic Heavy Ion Collider =

Particle accelerator at Brookhaven National Laboratory in Upton, New York, USA

Relativistic Heavy Ion Collider (RHIC)
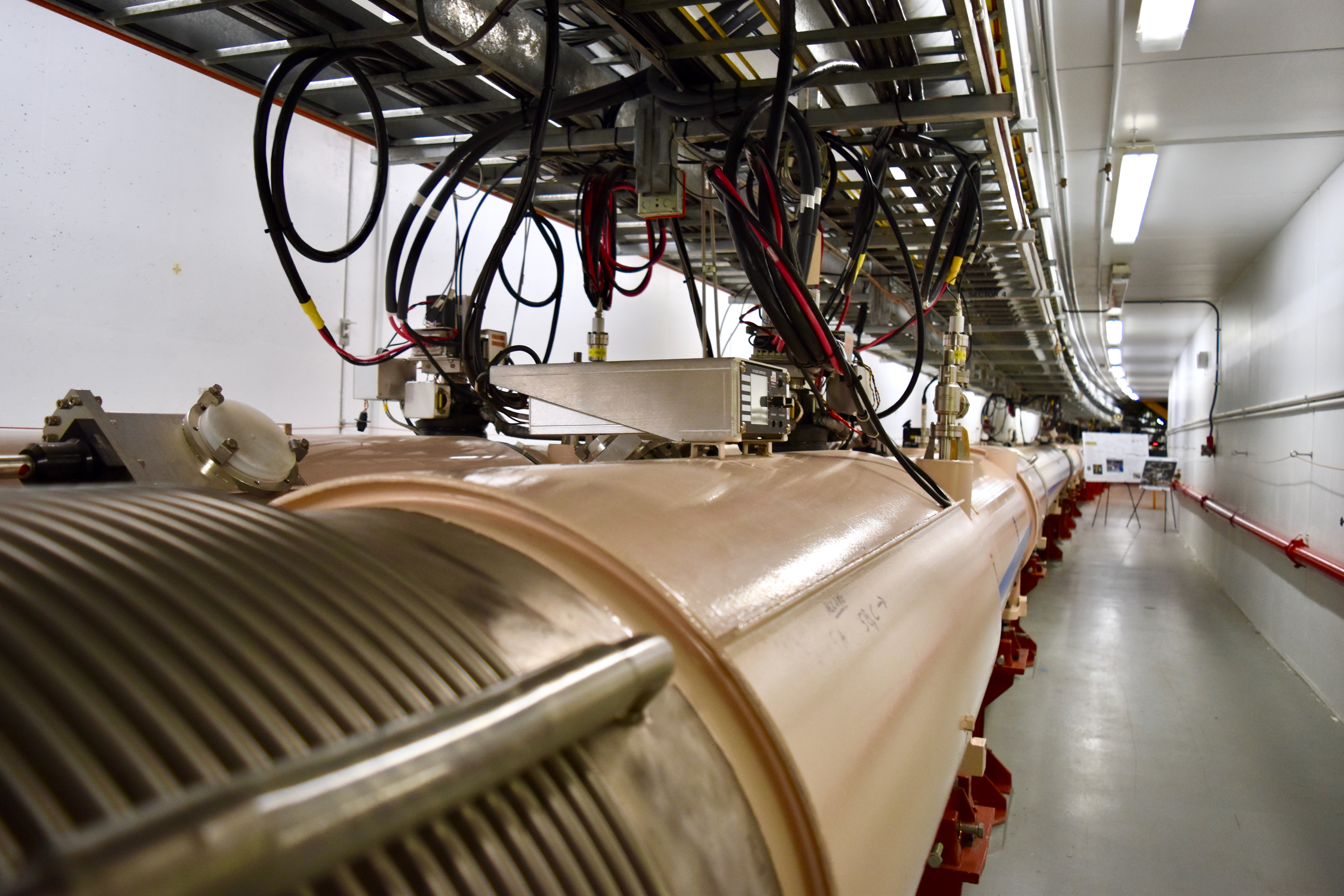
- The Relativistic Heavy Ion Collider at Brookhaven National Laboratory

General properties
- Accelerator type: synchrotron
- Beam type: polarized p to U ion
- Target type: collider

Beam properties
- Maximum energy: 255 GeV per beam (p), 100 GeV/nucleon per beam (Au ions)
- Maximum luminosity: 2.45×10^{32}/(cm^{2}⋅s) (p+p), 1.55×10^{28}/(cm^{2}⋅s) (Au+Au)

Physical properties
- Circumference: 3834 m
- Location: Upton, New York
- Coordinates: 40°53′2″N 72°52′33″W
- Institution: Brookhaven National Laboratory
- Dates of operation: 2000–2026

The Relativistic Heavy Ion Collider (RHIC /ˈrɪk/) is the first and one of only two operating heavy-ion colliders, and the only spin-polarized proton collider ever built. Located at Brookhaven National Laboratory (BNL) in Upton, New York, and used by an international team of researchers, it was the last operating particle collider in the US. By using RHIC to collide ions traveling at relativistic speeds, physicists study the primordial form of matter that existed in the universe shortly after the Big Bang. By colliding spin-polarized protons, the spin structure of the proton is explored.

RHIC was the second-highest-energy heavy-ion collider in the world, with nucleon energies for collisions reaching 100 GeV for gold ions and 250 GeV for protons. As of November 7, 2010, the Large Hadron Collider (LHC) has collided heavy ions of lead at higher energies than RHIC. The LHC operating time for ions (lead–lead and lead–proton collisions) is limited to about one month per year.

In 2010, RHIC physicists published results of temperature measurements from earlier experiments which concluded that temperatures in excess of 345 MeV (4 terakelvin or 7 trillion degrees Fahrenheit) had been achieved in gold ion collisions, and that these collision temperatures resulted in the breakdown of "normal matter" and the creation of a liquid-like quark–gluon plasma.

In January 2020, the US Department of Energy Office of Science selected the eRHIC design for the future Electron–Ion collider (EIC), building on the existing RHIC facility at BNL.

RHIC had its last collisions and ended data collection on 6 February 2026.

== The accelerator ==
RHIC is an intersecting storage ring particle accelerator. Two independent rings (arbitrarily denoted as "Blue" and "Yellow") circulate heavy ions and/or polarized protons in opposite directions and allow a virtually free choice of colliding positively charged particles (the eRHIC upgrade will allow collisions between positively and negatively charged particles). The RHIC double storage ring is hexagonally shaped and has a circumference of 3834 m, with curved edges in which stored particles are deflected and focused by 1,740 superconducting magnets using niobium-titanium conductors. The dipole magnets operate at 3.45 T. The six interaction points (between the particles circulating in the two rings) are in the middle of the six relatively straight sections, where the two rings cross, allowing the particles to collide. The interaction points are enumerated by clock positions, with the injection near 6 o'clock. Two large experiments, STAR and sPHENIX, are located at 6 and 8 o'clock respectively. The sPHENIX experiment is the newest experiment to be built at RHIC, replacing PHENIX at the 8 o'clock position.

A particle passes through several stages of boosters before it reaches the RHIC storage ring. The first stage for ions is the electron beam ion source (EBIS), while for protons, the 200 MeV linear accelerator (Linac) is used. As an example, gold nuclei leaving the EBIS have a kinetic energy of 2 MeV per nucleon and have an electric charge Q = +32 (32 of 79 electrons stripped from the gold atom). The particles are then accelerated by the Booster synchrotron to 100 MeV per nucleon, which injects the projectile now with Q = +77 into the Alternating Gradient Synchrotron (AGS), before they finally reach 8.86 GeV per nucleon and are injected in a Q = +79 state (no electrons left) into the RHIC storage ring over the AGS-to-RHIC Transfer Line (AtR).

To date the types of particle combinations explored at RHIC are p + p, p + Al, p + Au, d + Au, h + Au, Cu + Cu, Cu + Au, Zr + Zr, Ru + Ru, Au + Au, U + U O+O. The projectiles typically travel at 99.995% of the speed of light. For Au + Au collisions, the center-of-mass energy is typically 200 GeV per nucleon-pair, and was as low as 7.7 GeV per nucleon-pair. An average luminosity of 2×10^{26} cm^{−2}⋅s^{−1} was targeted during the planning. The current average Au + Au luminosity of the collider has reached 87×10^{26} cm^{−2}⋅s^{−1}, 44 times the design value. The heavy ion luminosity is substantially increased through stochastic cooling.

One unique characteristic of RHIC is its capability to collide polarized protons. RHIC holds the record of highest energy polarized proton beams. Polarized protons are injected into RHIC and preserve this state throughout the energy ramp. This is a difficult task that is accomplished with the aid of corkscrew magnetics called 'Siberian snakes' (in RHIC a chain 4 helical dipole magnets). The corkscrew induces the magnetic field to spiral along the direction of the beam Run-9 achieved center-of-mass energy of 500 GeV on 12 February 2009. In Run-13 the average p + p luminosity of the collider reached 160×10^{30} cm^{−2}⋅s^{−1}, with a time and intensity averaged polarization of 52%.

AC dipoles have been used in non-linear machine diagnostics for the first time in RHIC.

Accelerator components

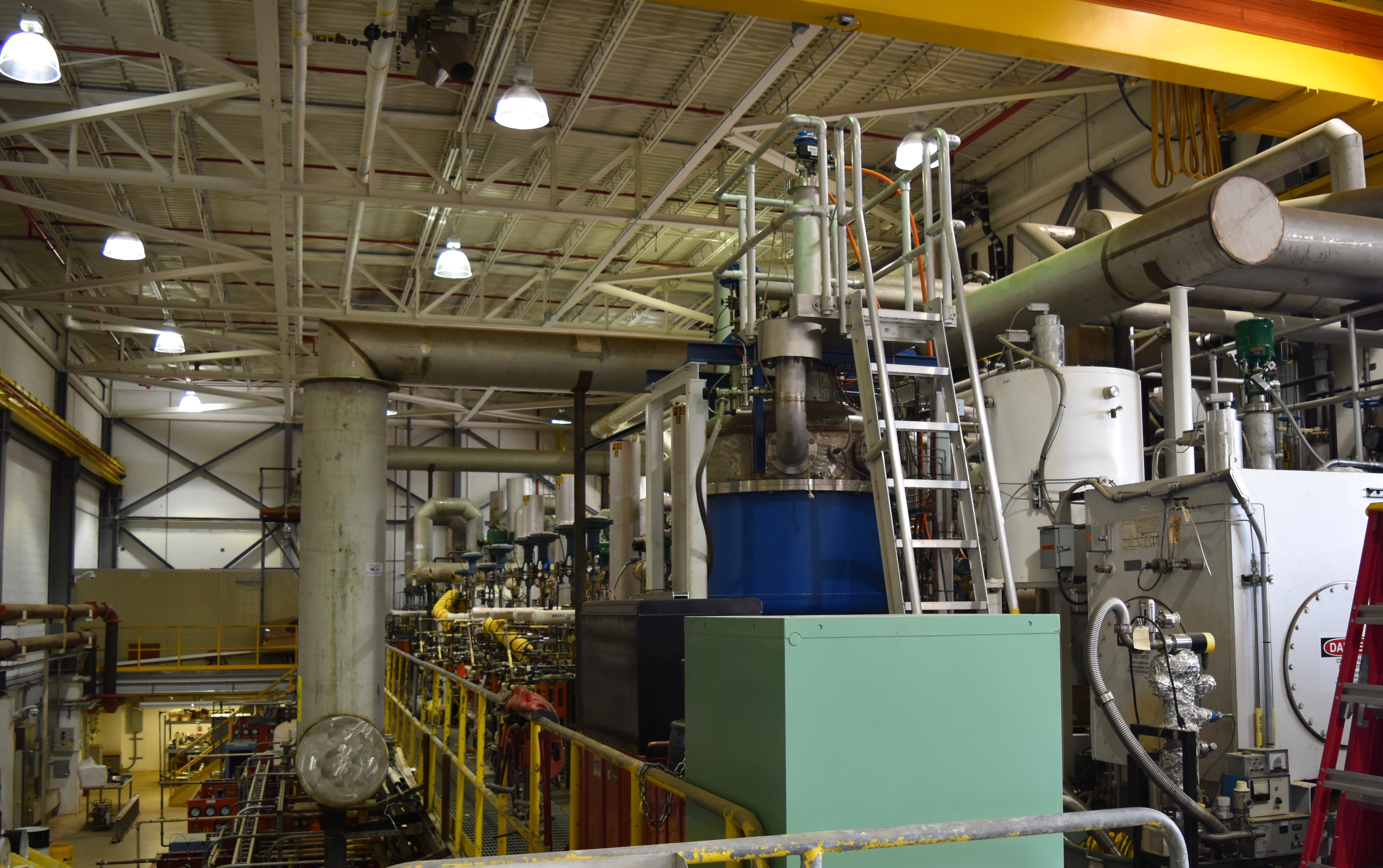
The 25 MW Helium refrigeration system that cools the superconducting magnets down to the operating temperature of 4.5 K

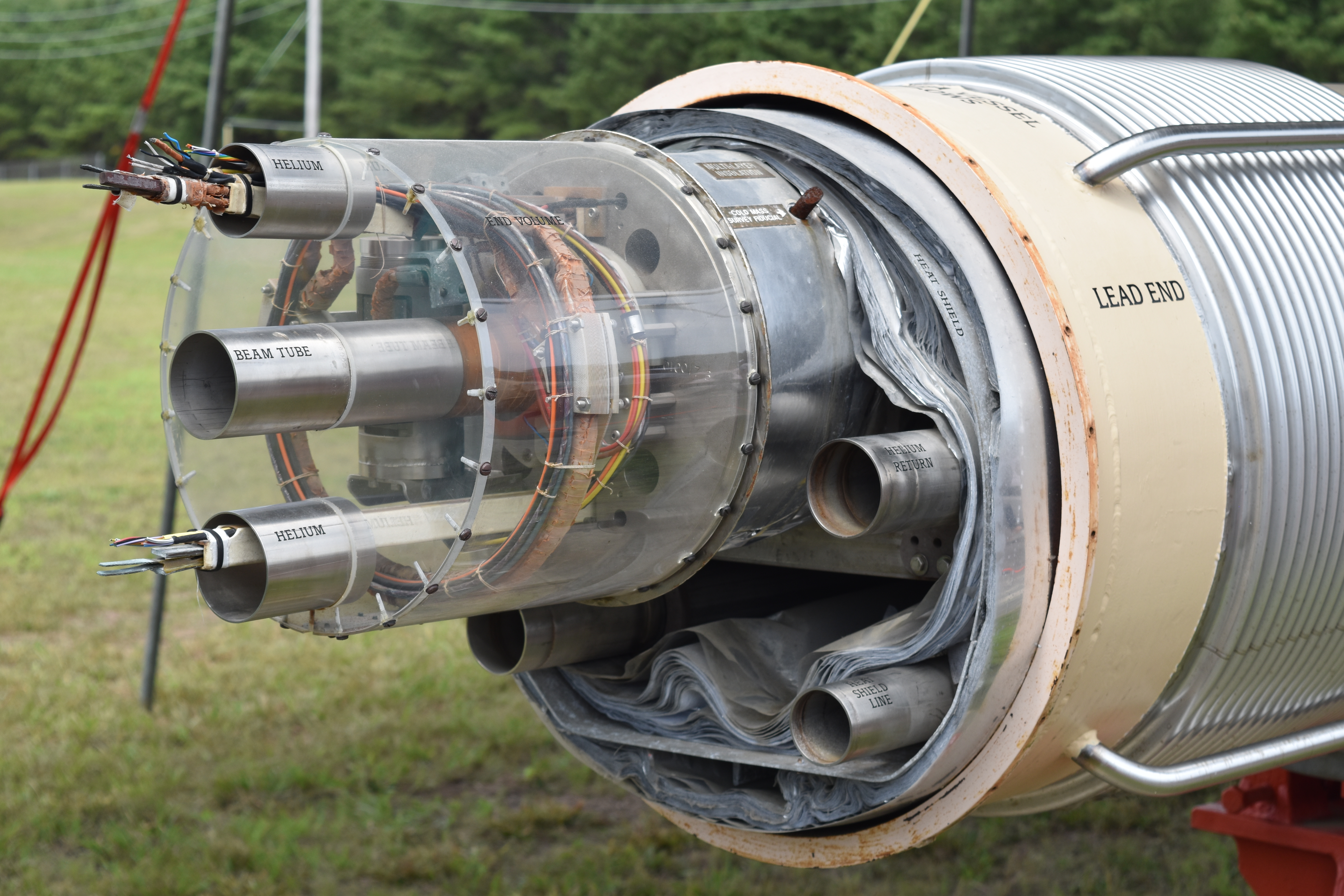
An arc dipole magnet. Electrical bus slots (top and bottom) and beam tube (middle) at the top section of the vacuum shell

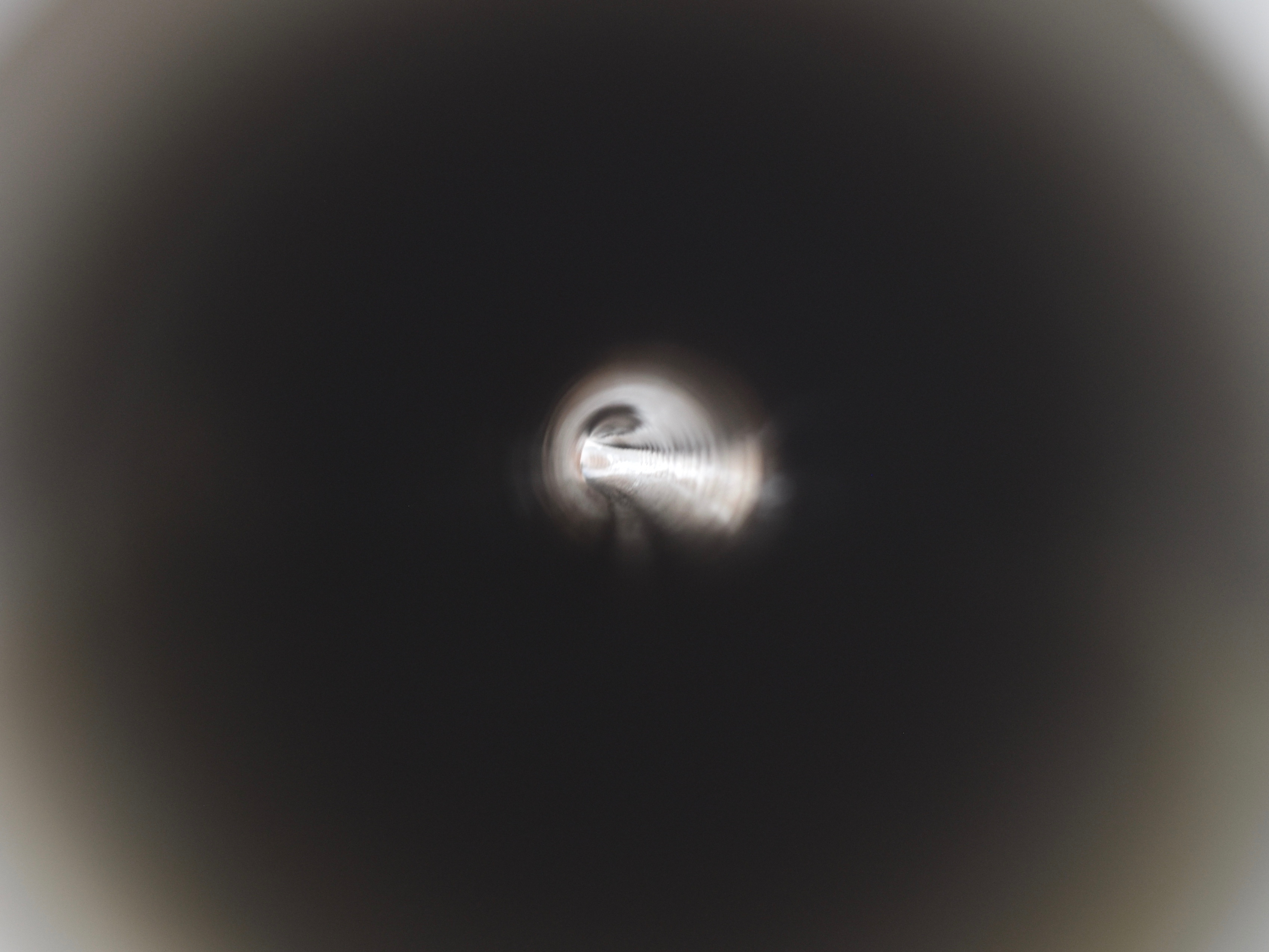
Curvature of beam tube seen through the ends of an arc dipole magnet

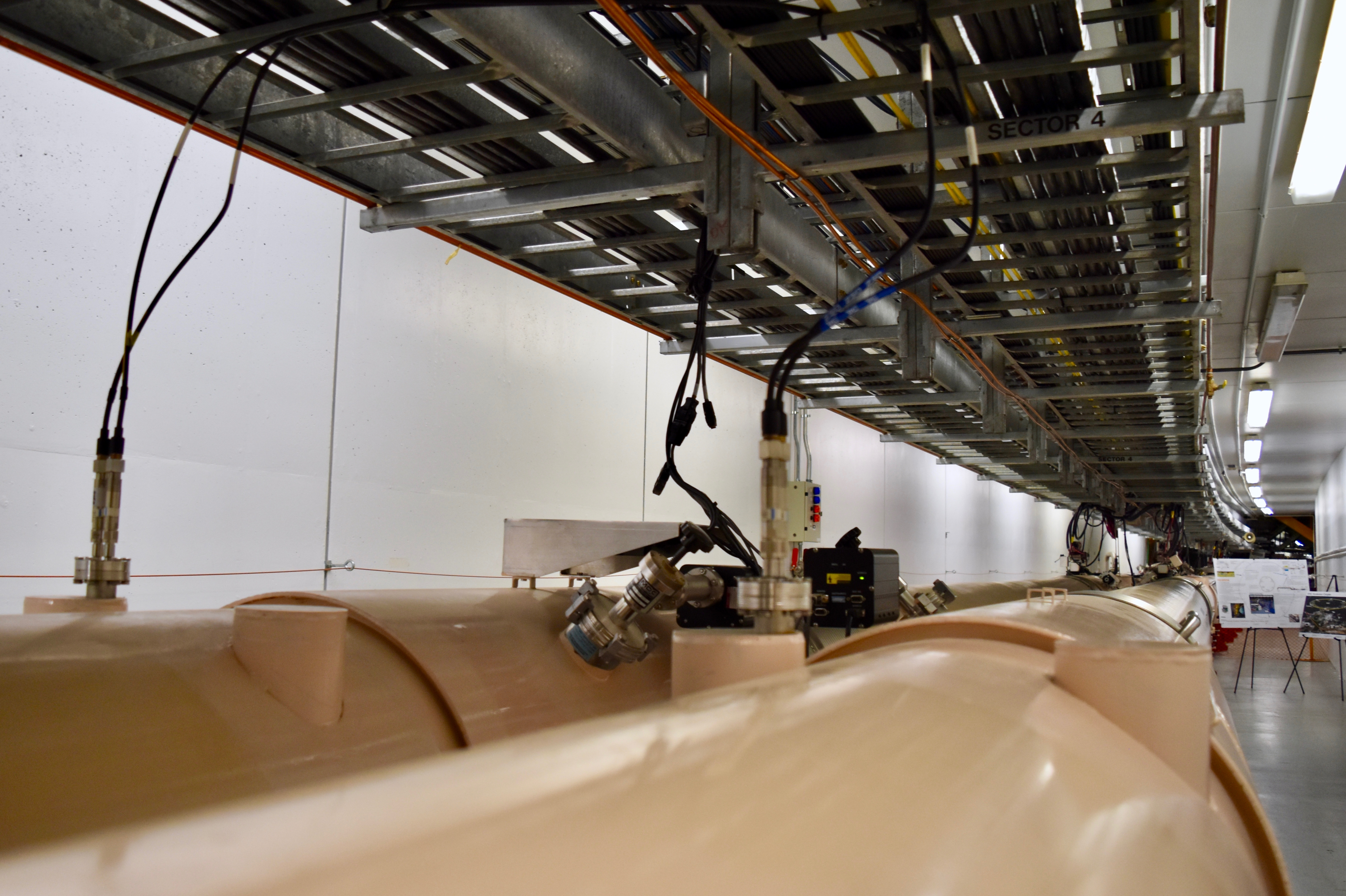
Two main accelerator rings inside the RHIC tunnel

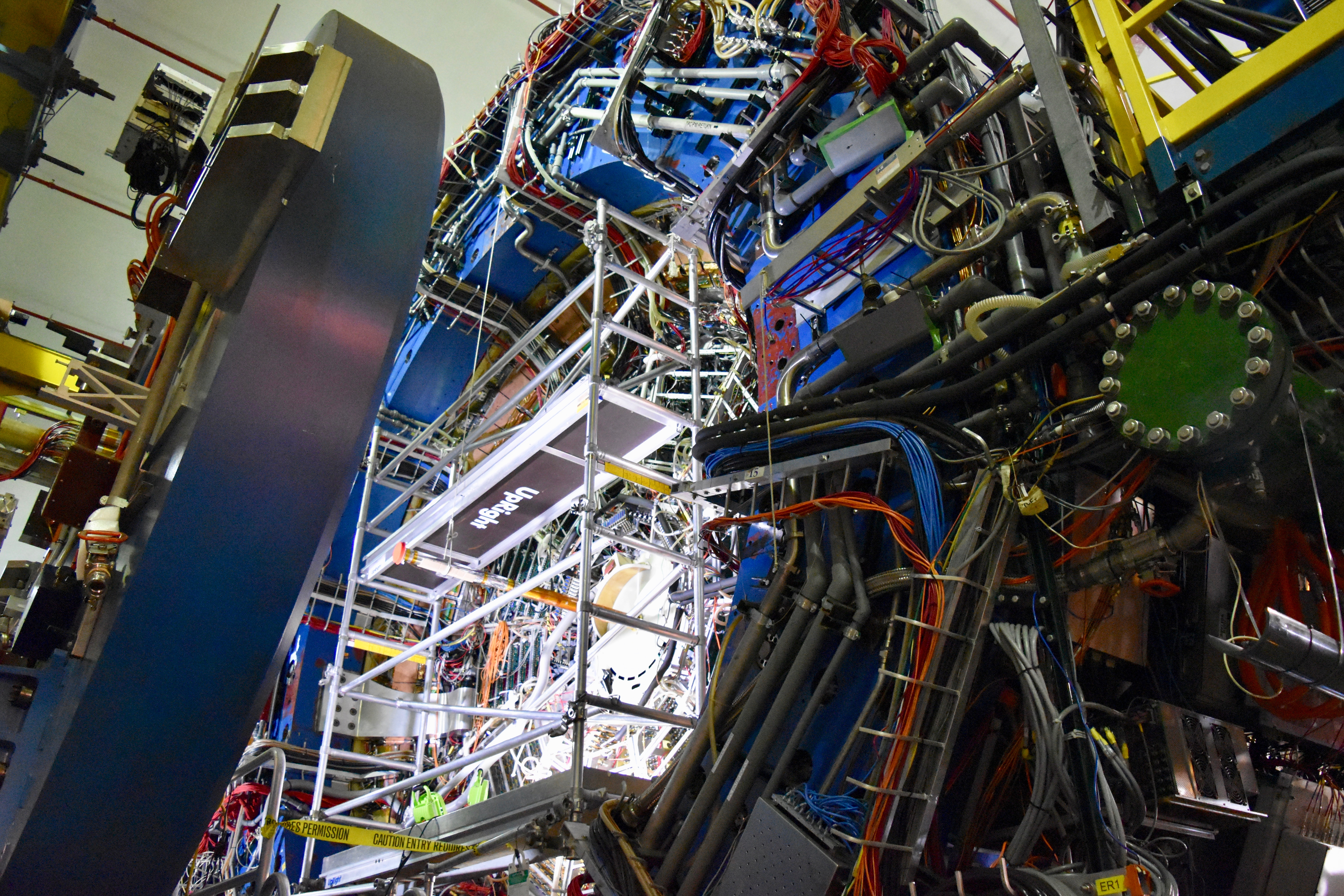
STAR detector

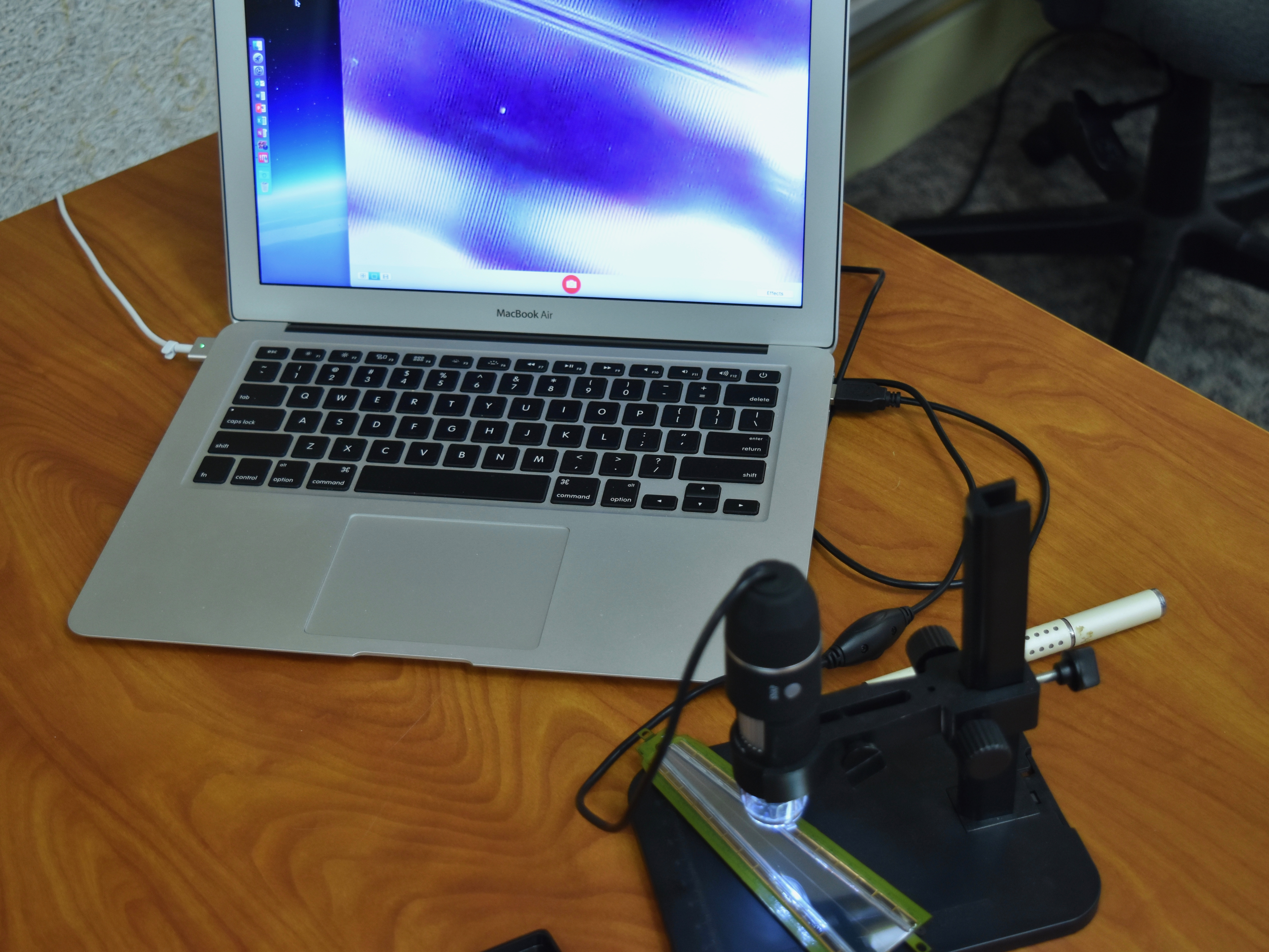
A Forward Silicon Vertex Detector (FVTX) sensor of PHENIX detector on a microscope

== The experiments ==
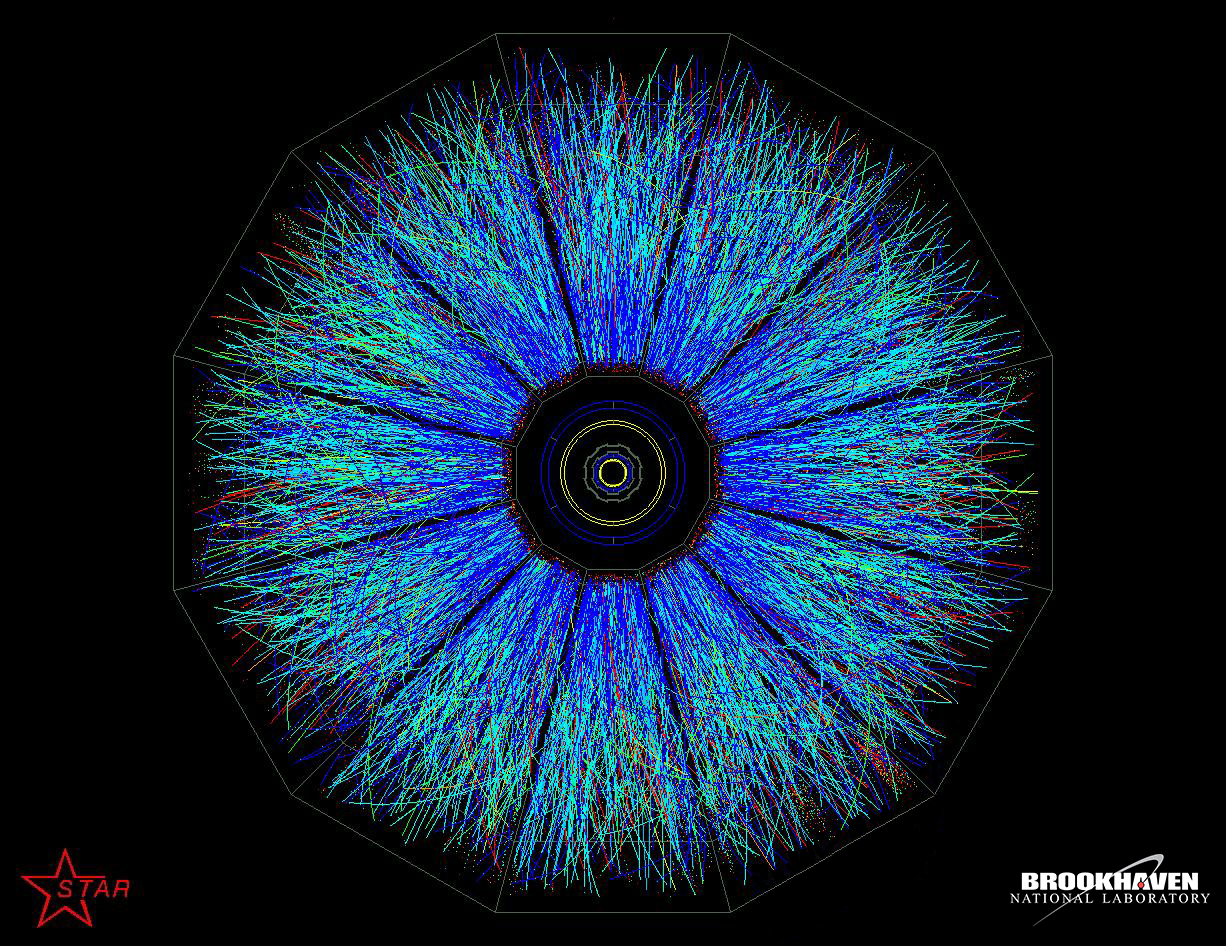
A view of gold ions collisions as captured by the STAR detector.

There are two detectors currently operating at RHIC: STAR (6 o'clock, and near the AGS-to-RHIC Transfer Line) and sPHENIX (8 o'clock), the successor to PHENIX. PHOBOS (10 o'clock) completed its operation in 2005, and BRAHMS (2 o'clock) in 2006.

Among the two larger detectors, STAR is aimed at the detection of hadrons with its system of time projection chambers covering a large solid angle and in a conventionally generated solenoidal magnetic field, while PHENIX is further specialized in detecting rare and electromagnetic particles, using a partial coverage detector system in a superconductively generated axial magnetic field. The smaller detectors have larger pseudorapidity coverage, PHOBOS has the largest pseudorapidity coverage of all detectors, and tailored for bulk particle multiplicity measurement, while BRAHMS is designed for momentum spectroscopy, in order to study the so-called "small-x" and saturation physics. There is an additional experiment, PP2PP (now part of STAR), investigating spin dependence in p + p scattering.

The spokespersons for each of the experiments are:

- STAR: Frank Geurts (Rice University)
- PHENIX: Yasuyuki Akiba (Riken)
- sPHENIX: Megan Connors (Georgia State University) and Jin Huang (Brookhaven National Laboratory)

== Current results ==
For the experimental objective of creating and studying the quark–gluon plasma, RHIC has the unique ability to provide baseline measurements for itself. This consists of both the lower energy and also lower mass number projectile combinations that do not result in the density of 200 GeV Au + Au collisions, like the p + p and d + Au collisions of the earlier runs, and also Cu + Cu collisions in Run-5.

Using this approach, important results of the measurement of the hot QCD matter created at RHIC are:

- Collective anisotropy, or elliptic flow. The major part of the particles with lower momenta is emitted following an angular distribution $dn/d\phi \propto 1 + 2 v_2(p_\mathrm{T}) \cos 2 \phi$ (p_{T} is the transverse momentum, $\phi$ angle with the reaction plane). This is a direct result of the elliptic shape of the nucleus overlap region during the collision and hydrodynamical property of the matter created.
- Jet quenching. In the heavy ion collision event, scattering with a high transverse p_{T} can serve as a probe for the hot QCD matter, as it loses its energy while traveling through the medium. Experimentally, the quantity R_{AA} (A is the mass number) being the quotient of observed jet yield in A + A collisions and N_{bin} × yield in p + p collisions shows a strong damping with increasing A, which is an indication of the new properties of the hot QCD matter created.
- Color glass condensate saturation. The Balitsky–Fadin–Kuraev–Lipatov (BFKL) dynamics which are the result of a resummation of large logarithmic terms ln(1/x) for deep inelastic scattering with small Bjorken-x, saturate at a unitarity limit $Q_s^2 \propto \langle N_\mathrm{part} \rangle/2$, with N_{part}/2 being the number of participant nucleons in a collision (as opposed to the number of binary collisions). The observed charged multiplicity follows the expected dependency of $n_\mathrm{ch}/A \propto 1/\alpha_s(Q_s^2)$, supporting the predictions of the color glass condensate model. For a detailed discussion, see e.g. Dmitri Kharzeev et al.; for an overview of color glass condensates, see e.g. Iancu & Venugopalan.
- Particle ratios. The particle ratios predicted by statistical models allow the calculation of parameters such as the temperature at chemical freeze-out T_{ch} and hadron chemical potential $\mu_B$. The experimental value T_{ch} varies a bit with the model used, with most authors giving a value of 160 MeV < T_{ch} < 180 MeV, which is very close to the expected QCD phase transition value of approximately 170 MeV obtained by lattice QCD calculations (see e.g. Karsch).

While in the first years, theorists were eager to claim that RHIC has discovered the quark–gluon plasma (e.g. Gyulassy & McLarren), the experimental groups were more careful not to jump to conclusions, citing various variables still in need of further measurement. The present results shows that the matter created is a fluid with a viscosity near the quantum limit, but is unlike a weakly interacting plasma (a widespread yet not quantitatively unfounded belief on how quark–gluon plasma looks).

A recent overview of the physics result is provided by the RHIC Experimental Evaluations 2004, a community-wide effort of RHIC experiments to evaluate the current data in the context of implication for formation of a new state of matter. These results are from the first three years of data collection at RHIC.

New results were published in Physical Review Letters on February 16, 2010, stating the discovery of the first hints of symmetry transformations, and that the observations may suggest that bubbles formed in the aftermath of the collisions created in the RHIC may break parity symmetry, which normally characterizes interactions between quarks and gluons.

The RHIC physicists announced new temperature measurements for these experiments of up to 4 trillion kelvins, the highest temperature ever achieved in a laboratory. It is described as a recreation of the conditions that existed during the birth of the Universe.

== Possible closure under flat nuclear science budget scenarios ==
In late 2012, the Nuclear Science Advisory Committee (NSAC) was asked to advise the Department of Energy's Office of Science and the National Science Foundation how to implement the nuclear science long range plan written in 2007, if future nuclear science budgets continue to provide no growth over the next four years. In a narrowly decided vote, the NSAC committee showed a slight preference, based on non-science related considerations, for shutting down RHIC rather than canceling the construction of the Facility for Rare Isotope Beams (FRIB).

By October 2015, the budget situation had improved, and RHIC continued operations into the next decade.

== The future ==
RHIC began operation in 2000 and until November 2010 was the highest-energy heavy-ion collider in the world. The Large Hadron Collider (LHC) of CERN, while used mainly for colliding protons, operates with heavy ions for about one month per year. The LHC has operated with 25 times higher energies per nucleon. As of 2018, RHIC and the LHC are the only operating hadron colliders in the world.

Due to the longer operating time per year, a greater number of colliding ion species and collision energies can be studied at RHIC. In addition and unlike the LHC, RHIC is also able to accelerate spin polarized protons, which would leave RHIC as the world's highest energy accelerator for studying spin-polarized proton structure.

A major upgrade is the Electron–Ion Collider (EIC), the addition of a 18 GeV high intensity electron beam facility, allowing electron–ion collisions. At least one new detector will have to be built to study the collisions. A review was published by Abhay Deshpande et al. in 2005. A more recent description is at:

On January 9, 2020, It was announced by Paul Dabbar, undersecretary of the US Department of Energy Office of Science, that the BNL eRHIC design has been selected for the future electron–ion collider (EIC) in the United States. In addition to the site selection, it was announced that the BNL EIC had acquired CD-0 (mission need) from the Department of Energy.

== Critics of high-energy experiments ==
Before RHIC started operation, critics postulated that the extremely high energy could produce catastrophic scenarios, such as creating a black hole, a transition into a different quantum mechanical vacuum (see false vacuum), or the creation of strange matter that is more stable than ordinary matter. These hypotheses are complex, but many predict that the Earth would be destroyed in a time frame from seconds to millennia, depending on the theory considered. However, the fact that objects of the Solar System (e.g., the Moon) have been bombarded with cosmic particles of significantly higher energies than that of RHIC and other man-made colliders for billions of years, without any harm to the Solar System, were among the most striking arguments that these hypotheses were unfounded.

The other main controversial issue was a demand by critics for physicists to reasonably exclude the probability for such a catastrophic scenario. Physicists are unable to demonstrate experimental and astrophysical constraints of zero probability of catastrophic events, nor that tomorrow Earth will be struck with a "doomsday" cosmic ray (they can only calculate an upper limit for the likelihood). The result would be the same destructive scenarios described above, although obviously not caused by humans. According to this argument of upper limits, RHIC would still modify the chance for the Earth's survival by an infinitesimal amount.

Concerns were raised in connection with the RHIC particle accelerator, both in the media and in the popular science media. The risk of a doomsday scenario was indicated by Martin Rees, with respect to the RHIC, as being at least a 1 in 50,000,000 chance. With regards to the production of strangelets, Frank Close, professor of physics at the University of Oxford, indicates that "the chance of this happening is like you winning the major prize on the lottery 3 weeks in succession; the problem is that people believe it is possible to win the lottery 3 weeks in succession." After detailed studies, scientists reached such conclusions as "beyond reasonable doubt, heavy-ion experiments at RHIC will not endanger our planet" and that there is "powerful empirical evidence against the possibility of dangerous strangelet production".

The debate started in 1999 with an exchange of letters in Scientific American between Walter L. Wagner and F. Wilczek, in response to a previous article by M. Mukerjee. The media attention unfolded with an article in UK Sunday Times of July 18, 1999, by J. Leake, closely followed by articles in the U.S. media. The controversy mostly ended with the report of a committee convened by the director of Brookhaven National Laboratory, J. H. Marburger, ostensibly ruling out the catastrophic scenarios depicted. However, the report left open the possibility that relativistic cosmic ray impact products might behave differently while transiting earth compared to "at rest" RHIC products; and the possibility that the qualitative difference between high-E proton collisions with earth or the moon might be different than gold on gold collisions at the RHIC. Wagner tried subsequently to stop full-energy collision at RHIC by filing Federal lawsuits in San Francisco and New York, but without success. The New York suit was dismissed on the technicality that the San Francisco suit was the preferred forum. The San Francisco suit was dismissed, but with leave to refile if additional information was developed and presented to the court.

On March 17, 2005, the BBC published an article implying that researcher Horaţiu Năstase believes black holes have been created at RHIC. However, the original papers of H. Năstase and the New Scientist article cited by the BBC state that the correspondence of the hot dense QCD matter created in RHIC to a black hole is only in the sense of a correspondence of QCD scattering in Minkowski space and scattering in the AdS_{5} × X_{5} space in AdS/CFT; in other words, it is similar mathematically. Therefore, RHIC collisions might be described by mathematics relevant to theories of quantum gravity within AdS/CFT, but the described physical phenomena are not the same.

== Financial information ==
The RHIC project was sponsored by the United States Department of Energy, Office of Science, Office of Nuclear physics. It had a line-item budget of 616.6 million U.S. dollars.

For fiscal year 2006 the operational budget was reduced by 16.1 million U.S. dollars from the previous year, to 115.5 million U.S. dollars. Though operation under the fiscal year 2006 federal budget cut was uncertain, a key portion of the operational cost (13 million U.S. dollars) was contributed privately by a group close to Renaissance Technologies of East Setauket, New York.

== In fiction ==
- The novel Cosm (ISBN 0-380-79052-1) by the American author Gregory Benford takes place at RHIC. The science fiction setting describes the main character Alicia Butterworth, a physicist at the BRAHMS experiment, and a new universe being created in RHIC by accident, while running with uranium ions.
- The zombie apocalypse novel The Rising by the American author Brian Keene referenced the media concerns of activating the RHIC raised by the article in The Sunday Times of July 18, 1999, by J. Leake. As revealed very early in the story, side effects of the collider experiments of the RHIC (located at "Havenbrook National Laboratories") were the cause of the zombie uprising in the novel and its sequel City of the Dead.

== See also ==
- The ISABELLE Project
- Large Hadron Collider
