= Stuart Freedman =

American physicist (1944–2012)

Stuart Jay Freedman
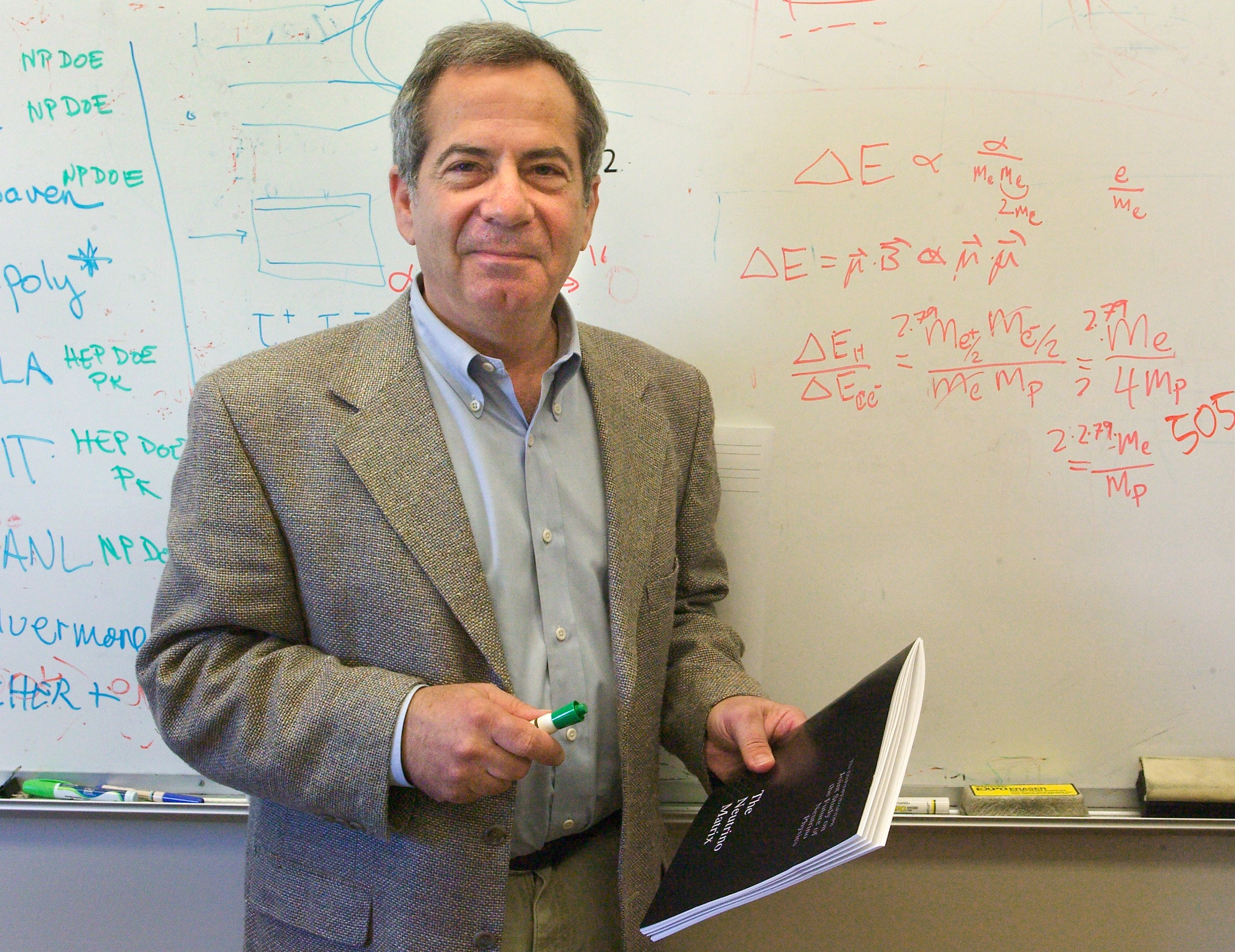
- Prof. Stuart Freedman, 2005
- Born: January 13, 1944; Hollywood, California, U.S.
- Died: November 10, 2012 (aged 68); Santa Fe, New Mexico, U.S.
- Education: University of California, Berkeley (BS, PhD)
- Awards: Elected to National Academy of Sciences (2001); Tom W. Bonner Prize in Nuclear Physics (2007)
- Scientific career
- Fields: neutrino physics, nuclear physics, weak interaction physics
- Workplaces: Lawrence Berkeley National Laboratory; University of California, Berkeley
- Thesis: Experimental Test of Local Hidden-Variable Theories (1972)
- Doctoral advisor: Eugene Commins

Stuart Jay Freedman (January 13, 1944 – November 10, 2012) was an American physicist, known for his experiment testing Bell's inequality proposed to him by John Clauser at the University of California, Berkeley as well as for his contributions to nuclear and particle physics, particularly weak interaction physics. He was a graduate of Berkeley, receiving a Bachelor of Science in 1965 and his PhD in physics in 1972 under Eugene Commins. While at Berkeley, he worked with fellow graduate student Steven Chu. He was also recipient of 2007 Tom W. Bonner Prize in Nuclear Physics.

He held positions at Princeton University, Stanford University, Argonne National Laboratory, the University of Chicago, the University of California, Berkeley, and the Lawrence Berkeley Laboratory.

== Early life and education ==
Freedman was born in Los Angeles on 13 January 1944. He attended high school there before moving north to attend the University of California, Berkeley. After beginning studies as a theorist under Prof. Charles Zemach, he switched to experimental atomic physics under the guidance of Prof. Eugene Commins. Commins's students from that era included Frank Calaprice, Steven Chu, Philip Bucksbaum, and Persis Drell.

== Career ==
Freedman's thesis experiment tested Bell's inequality, which distinguishes orthodox quantum mechanics from hidden variable theories. Following the proposal of Clauser, Horne, Shimony, and Holt, Freedman formulated an inequality appropriate to the experiment he performed. That experiment agreed with the predictions of orthodox quantum mechanics and disagreed with hidden variable theories by six standard deviations. This experiment figured centrally in the Nobel Prize for Physics in 2022.

From this auspicious start, Freedman carried out a series of experiments in atomic, nuclear, and particle physics testing the most fundamental theories and principles.

In a 1975 experiment with Frank Calaprice and collaborators, Freedman studied the beta decay of polarized ^{19}Ne, looking for the presence of second class weak currents, that is, currents forbidden by G-parity.

While the Higgs boson was ultimately discovered at CERN in 2012, the mass range for initial searches for the Higgs boson was completely unconstrained. A very light Higgs boson could be emitted by ^{4}He in the 0^{+} excited state at 20 MeV and observed in its decay to e^{+}e^{−}. Freedman and collaborators found no such effect, excluding Higgs masses between 3 and 14 MeV.

The ratio of the axial to vector coupling of the neutron in beta decay is a fundamental parameter and the measurement of g_{A}/g_{V}=1.262±0.005 made at Grenoble in 1985 by Freedman and collaborators set a new standard for precision.

Freedman was known for the care he took in carrying out experiments and became an effective antidote for spectacular, improbable results. Reports of narrow lines in e^{+}e^{−} coincidences in heavy ion collisions prompted Freedman and collaborators to seek an observation of the effect. The result was entirely negative.

Perhaps more dramatic were reports that there was a neutrino with mass 17 keV. The mixing of this neutrino with conventional massless or very light neutrinos would modify the beta-decay spectrum. Freedman's team found no such neutrino. Moreover, the effectiveness of the technique was confirmed by adding some ^{14}C whose decay would mimic that of the hypothesized heavy neutrino.

The discovery of neutrino oscillations and its implication that neutrinos are massive are among the most important advances in particle physics in the late twentieth century. The detailed evaluation of the Pontecorvo-Maki-Nakagawa-Sakata matrix (PMNS) for neutrino mixing required carefully designed experiments. Atsuto Suzuki of Tokyo and Tohoku Universities recognized that a collection of Japanese nuclear reactors provided just the needed source for such an experiment. Giorgio Gratta of Stanford led a team of American universities joining the Japanese team. A Berkeley team, headed by Freedman, joined this experiment, known as KamLAND (Kamioka Liquid Scintillator Antineutrino Detector) and Freedman became American cospokesperson with Gratta in 1998. KamLAND was enormously successful.,, even producing a plot directly showing oscillations.

In memory of his contributions, the American Physical Society (APS) established an award in his name, the Stuart Jay Freedman Award in Experimental Nuclear Physics. He was elected a Fellow of the APS in 1984 for "important studies of weak interactions phenomena in nuclei."
