= Ju-Chin Chu =

Chinese-American chemical engineer (1919–2000)

- 朱汝瑾
- Born: December 14, 1919; Liuhe, Taicang, China
- Died: November 15, 2000 (aged 80)
- Education: Tsinghua University (BS); National Southwestern Associated University (MS); Massachusetts Institute of Technology (PhD)
- Spouse: Ching-Chen Li
- Children: Steven; Gilbert; Morgan
- Scientific career
- Fields: Chemical engineering
- Institutions: Washington University; Brooklyn Polytechnic Institute
- Thesis: Chlorination of methane by hydrogen chloride (1946)

Ju-Chin Chu (Chinese: 朱汝瑾; pinyin: Zhū Rújǐn; December 14, 1919 – November 15, 2000) was a Chinese-American chemical engineer. He was the father of Steven Chu.

== Life and career ==
Chu was born in Liuhe, Taicang, Suzhou. He attended Suzhou High School, Tsinghua University and National Southwestern Associated University in China before he went to Massachusetts Institute of Technology for Ph.D. education in 1946. After graduating from MIT, he taught at Washington University in St. Louis from 1946 to 1949, at Brooklyn Polytechnic Institute from 1949 to 1966, and at Virginia Tech from 1967 to 1972. He became an Academia Sinica member in 1964.

== Personal life ==
Ju-Chin Chu's wife Ching-Chen Li also studied at Massachusetts Institute of Technology, majoring in economics. His second-born son Steven Chu is a Nobel laureate in physics and the twelfth United States Secretary of Energy in the Obama administration. His eldest son Gilbert Chu is a professor of biochemistry and medicine at Stanford University, while the youngest, Morgan Chu, is a patent lawyer who is a partner and the former Co-Managing Partner at the law firm Irell & Manella LLP.
