= Eugene D. Commins =

American physicist (1932–2015)

Eugene Commins
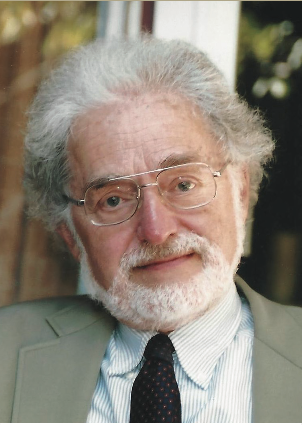
- Born: July 1, 1932
- Died: September 26, 2015 (aged 83)
- Education: Columbia University (PhD)
- Awards: National Academy of Sciences (1987); Oersted Medal (2005)
- Scientific career
- Fields: Physics
- Workplaces: University of California, Berkeley
- Thesis: Hyperfine structure of the metastable state of singly ionized helium-3 (1958)
- Doctoral advisor: Polykarp Kusch
- Doctoral students: Hyatt Gibbs; Stuart Freedman; Steven Chu; Persis Drell; Philip H. Bucksbaum; David DeMille; Dmitry Budker

Eugene David Commins (July 1, 1932 – September 26, 2015) was an American physicist and professor of physics at the University of California, Berkeley. He was named a member of the National Academy of Sciences in 1987. He was also a fellow of the American Association for the Advancement of Science, the American Physical Society, and a member of the American Academy of Arts and Sciences.

== Career ==
Born in New York City, Commins finished his Ph.D. at Columbia University in 1958 under Nobel Prize laureate Polykarp Kusch. After serving as a research physicist at the Columbia Radiation Lab, he joined the physics department at Berkeley in 1960 as an assistant professor. He became associate professor in 1965 and full professor in 1969. Commins also served as the chair of the department from 1972 to 1974 and was named professor emeritus in 2005.

Commins and a group of his students were among the first to observe atomic parity violation, a subtle effect of the fundamental weak interactions. These experiments confirmed the Weinberg-Salam-Glashow model of electroweak interaction which is at the core of the Standard Model and for which the three theorists were awarded the Nobel Prize in Physics in 1979.

Besides being a distinguished researcher, Commins was also known for being a great teacher and mentor of future physicists. His most famous student is Steven Chu, who won the Nobel Prize in Physics in 1997 for his discovery of laser cooling and served as U.S. Secretary of Energy during the Obama administration. Another student, Persis Drell, became director of the SLAC National Accelerator Laboratory. Many of his other students became prominent researchers in fields ranging from nuclear and particle physics to atomic, molecular, and optical physics at top institutions all around the United States. These students include Hyatt Gibbs, Frank Calaprice, Stuart Freedman, Phillip Bucksbaum, Larry Hunter, Carol Tanner, David DeMille, Dmitry Budker, and Chris Regan.

Although he retired in 2001 he remained active in the department, continuing to teach and informally mentor Physics department students. That same year, colleagues, friends and former students gathered to honor him with the "ComminsFest Symposium." The two-day event featured talks on Commins' past and present scientific interests and highlighted his passion for music and art. It featured an array of distinguished speakers, most of whom traced their academic lineage to Commins. The conference proceedings, Art and Symmetry in Experimental Physics was published shortly thereafter.

In 2014, Commins authored the book, Quantum Mechanics: an Experimentalist's Approach, an outgrowth of lecture notes he developed while teaching Physics 221AB frequently between 1965 and 2010.

== Legacy ==
As a testament to his worldwide impact in mentoring graduate students, Steven Chu launched a philanthropy campaign to create a chair in his honor. The Eugene D. Commins Chair in Experimental Physics will celebrate a lifetime of accomplishments. "Eugene Commins had an uncanny ability to bring out the best in all his students, " said Chu. "He is a model of what a scientist and mentor should be."
