= David Moore (biologist) =

American molecular biologist

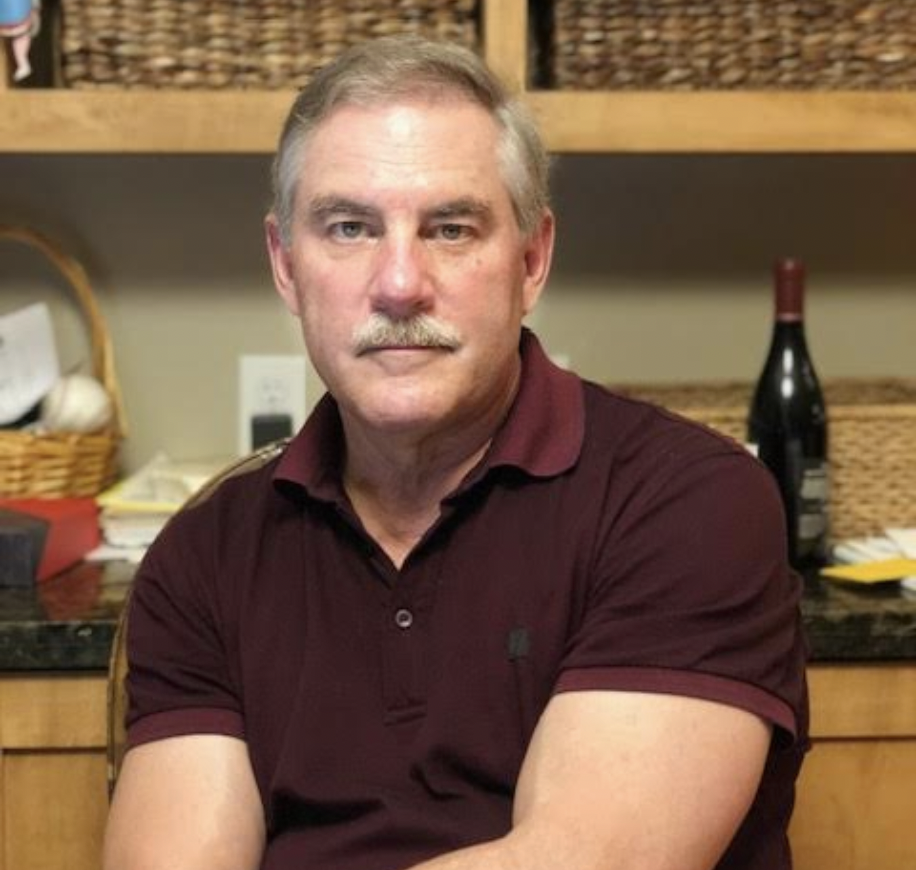
- David Moore in 2017
- Born: David Dudley Moore; August 21, 1952 (age 74); Brookline, Massachusetts
- Education: Brown University (A.B.) University of Wisconsin–Madison (Ph.D.)
- Known for: Discovery of constitutive androstane receptor, farnesoid X receptor, and small heterodimer partner
- Spouse: Judy Lin
- Children: 1
- Awards: Edwin B. Astwood Award, Endocrine Society (1999) Member of the National Academy of Sciences (2019) Transatlantic Medal, Society for Endocrinology (2021) Adolf Windaus Prize, Falk Foundation (2022) Fellow of the American Association for the Advancement of Science (2022)
- Scientific career
- Fields: Molecular biology Endocrinology Toxicology
- Workplaces: University of California, San Francisco Massachusetts General Hospital Harvard Medical School Baylor College of Medicine Korea Advanced Institute of Science and Technology University of California, Berkeley
- Thesis: Sequence organization of lambdoid bacteriophage origins of DNA replication (1979)
- Doctoral advisor: Frederick Blattner

David Dudley Moore (born August 21, 1952) is an American molecular biologist known for his work investigating nuclear hormone receptors. He is a Professor and Chair of the Department of Metabolic Biology & Nutrition at the University of California, Berkeley. He was a founding editor for the Current Protocols series of laboratory manuals in 1987.

Moore has been a leading figure in the investigation of nuclear hormone receptors, having initially discovered and described many family members. Some of his most significant discoveries are the constitutive androstane receptor (CAR) in 1994, farnesoid X receptor (FXR) in 1995, and the small heterodimer partner (SHP) in 1996.

In 2019 he was elected to the National Academy of Sciences.

== Early life and education ==
Moore was born in Brookline, Massachusetts in 1952, and was adopted by Clinton and Emily Moore from The Home for Little Wanderers. He was raised in Cincinnati, Ohio and graduated from Madeira High School in 1970.

After completing his undergraduate degree at Brown University in Providence, Rhode Island in 1974, he received his Ph.D. in 1979 from the University of Wisconsin–Madison, studying origin of replication sequences in bacteriophage lambda under Frederick Blattner.

== Research career ==
Moore began work as a postdoctoral researcher in 1979 in the laboratory of Howard Goodman in the Department of Biochemistry and Biophysics at the University of California, San Francisco, where he studied the genetic sequence of human growth hormone and the DNA binding activity of the glucocorticoid receptor.

Moore joined the faculty of the Department of Genetics at Harvard Medical School in 1981, and became a founding member of the Department of Molecular Biology at Massachusetts General Hospital. There, Moore's research lab investigated the activity of thyroid hormone and its relation to growth hormone expression. In collaboration with P. Reed Larsen, he identified several novel thyroid hormone receptors.

In 1987, Moore, alongside other colleagues including Frederick M Ausbel, established the laboratory manual series Current Protocols in Molecular Biology, which was acquired by Wiley in 1995 and later expanded to include additional titles.

Moore published a series of studies beginning in 1994 identifying and describing the constitutive androstane receptor (CAR), a constitutively active nuclear receptor which senses and responds to endobiotic and xenobiotic substances.

In 1996, Moore and his lab identified the small heterodimer partner (SHP), an orphan nuclear receptor without DNA-binding activity which binds other proteins to regulate their activity. He found that SHP inhibits estrogen receptors as well as retinoid receptors. He later found that SHP regulates the circadian clock in mice.

In 1997, Moore was recruited to the Department of Molecular and Cellular Biology, then headed by Bert W. O'Malley, at Baylor College of Medicine in Houston, Texas. There, he identified the bile acid and xenobiotic ligands of farnesoid X-receptor, an orphan nuclear receptor he had first purified in 1995, and an upstream regulator of SHP. He also identified androstane metabolites and xenobiotics as ligands for CAR during this time.

The discovery of bile acid ligands for FXR led Moore and colleagues to demonstrate a strong link between nuclear hormone receptors and liver disease. He showed that disruption of CAR, FXR, and SHP leads to liver tumors, hepatomegaly, and fatty liver disease.

Moore became professor of the Department of Nutritional Sciences & Toxicology at the University of California, Berkeley in 2020, where he became department chair in 2022.

Moore's h-index is 110 and i10-index is 303, and his publications have been cited over 87,000 times as of August 2023 according to his Google Scholar page.

== Awards and honors ==
Moore has received many academic prizes for his work, including the Edwin B. Astwood Award from the Endocrine Society and the Transatlantic Medal from the Society for Endocrinology. Moore was elected to the National Academy of Sciences in 2019 and in 2022 became a fellow at the American Association for the Advancement of Science.
