= Dmitry Budker =

Russian-American physicist

- Дмитрий Будкер
- Born: 1963 (age 62–63); Soviet Union
- Education: Novosibirsk State University (MS equivalent); University of California, Berkeley (PhD)
- Known for: Atomic parity violation Magnetometry; Zero- to ultra-low-field NMR; Dark matter detection Gamma Factory project
- Awards: Miller Research Professorship at UC Berkeley; Fellow of the American Physical Society; Norman F. Ramsey Prize (2021)
- Scientific career
- Fields: Atomic, molecular, and optical physics
- Workplaces: Johannes Gutenberg University of Mainz; Helmholtz Institute Mainz; University of California, Berkeley; Lawrence Berkeley National Laboratory
- Doctoral advisor: Eugene D. Commins

Dmitry Budker (born 1963) is a Russian-American physicist known for his work in atomic, molecular, and optical physics, as well as precision measurements and fundamental symmetries. He is currently a Professor at the Johannes Gutenberg University of Mainz and the Helmholtz Institute Mainz in Germany, as well as a Professor of the Graduate School at the University of California, Berkeley.

== Early life and education ==
Budker was born in 1963 in the former Soviet Union. He attended Novosibirsk State University from 1980 to 1985, receiving a diploma (equivalent to an MS) with honors from its Department of Physics.

After graduation, Budker worked as a junior researcher at the Budker Institute of Nuclear Physics in Novosibirsk, conducting research on laser spectroscopy of atoms. In 1989, he moved to the United States to pursue his doctoral studies at the University of California, Berkeley. He received his Ph.D. in physics from UC Berkeley in 1993 under the supervision of Eugene D. Commins.

== Career and research ==
Following his Ph.D., Budker held a postdoctoral position at UC Berkeley until 1995, when he was appointed to the faculty. He became a full professor in 2005. From 1996 to 2015, he was also a Faculty Scientist at the Lawrence Berkeley National Laboratory, where he developed tabletop experiments probing fundamental physics. In 2014, Budker joined the Johannes Gutenberg University of Mainz as Professor of Experimental Atomic Physics, leading the Matter-Antimatter Asymmetry section at the Helmholtz Institute Mainz. Since 2016, he has held a dual appointment as a Professor of the Graduate School at UC Berkeley.

=== Atomic parity violation ===
Budker's team observed the largest parity violation in atoms using ytterbium isotopes in 2009, with a signal 100 times stronger than previous cesium-based experiments. By probing forbidden transitions in ytterbium-174, they revealed how the weak nuclear force mixes atomic states of opposite parity, enabling measurements of neutron distributions in nuclei. This work provided experimental constraints on the hypothetical "neutron skin" in heavy nuclei and for testing anapole moments predicted by the Standard Model.

=== Tests of fundamental symmetries ===
In 2010, Budker's group conducted tests of the spin-statistics theorem, confirming photons obey Bose-Einstein statistics with <1 violation per 100 billion interactions. Using barium atoms and counter-propagating lasers, they searched for forbidden two-photon transitions that would violate quantum statistics, achieving a 3,000-fold sensitivity improvement over prior work. This validated the microcausality principle in quantum field theory.

=== Dark matter detection ===
Budker developed atomic sensor techniques to search for axions and other ultralight dark matter candidates. In 2015, his team used optical magnetometry to set limits on scalar dark matter coupling to electrons, achieving sub-femtotesla sensitivity.

=== NV quantum sensing ===
Budker advanced NV-center magnetometry, demonstrating sub-picotesla sensitivity for applications in MRI and materials science. His 2006 prototype atomic gradiometer used nonlinear magneto-optical rotation in antirelaxation-coated cells, enabling biomagnetic imaging without cryogenics. In 2015, he co-developed zero-field NMR techniques using NV centers to detect J-coupling in chemicals, enabling portable spectroscopy. This work has been applied to study superfluid helium's optical properties and map cardiac magnetism in humans.

== Awards and honors ==
- American Physical Society Award for Outstanding Doctoral Thesis Research in AMO Physics (1994)
- Miller Research Professorship at UC Berkeley
- Fellow of the American Physical Society (2005)
- Norman F. Ramsey Prize of the APS (2021)
- European Research Council Advanced Grant (2015)
