= Michale Fee =

American neuroscientist (born 1964)

- Born: November 6, 1964 (age 61); Pasadena, California, U.S.
- Education: University of Michigan (BE); Stanford University (PhD)
- Scientific career
- Fields: Applied physics
- Workplaces: Bell Laboratories; Massachusetts Institute of Technology
- Thesis: Measurement of the positronium triplet-1S(1)-triplet-2S(1) interval by continuous-wave two-photon excitation (1992)
- Doctoral advisor: Steven Chu
- Other academic advisors: David Kleinfeld
- Website: web.mit.edu/feelab/

Michale Sean Fee (born November 6, 1964) is an American applied physicist who works on the neural mechanisms of sequence generation and learning. Michale Fee is faculty in the Department of Brain and Cognitive Sciences at the Massachusetts Institute of Technology, and an Investigator in the McGovern Institute for Brain Research. His laboratory studies how songbirds generate and learn complex vocal sequences.

== Biography ==
Michale Fee received a B.E. with honors in engineering physics from the School of Engineering at the University of Michigan (1985). He received a Ph.D. in applied physics from Stanford University (1992), where he conducted his thesis work in the laboratory of Steven Chu. From September 1992 to June 1996, he was a postdoctoral fellow at Bell Laboratories in the Biological Computation Research Department, where he worked in the laboratory of David Kleinfeld on the cortical circuitry in the vibrissa system of the rat underlying the sense of touch.

In 1996 Michale Fee joined the Biological Computation Research Department at Bell Labs as a permanent researcher (Member of Technical Staff), at which time he began working on the mechanisms of vocal sequence generation in the songbird. In 2003, he joined the faculty of the Department of Brain and Cognitive Sciences at MIT as Associate Professor of Neuroscience with tenure. At the same time he was appointed as an investigator in the McGovern Institute for Brain Research. He has delivered lectures in numerous international conferences and research departments. He was promoted to Full Professor at MIT in 2010.

== Research ==
Michale Fee's research aims to understand how neural circuits in the brain subserve the generation and learning or complex motor sequences. His lab primarily uses the zebra finch as a model system. Zebra finches, like other songbirds, learn their songs from their father and are commonly used to study the neural mechanisms of motor learning. He and his colleagues discovered that the timing of song is encoded in the zebra finch using a very sparse code, with neurons in the high vocal center of the avian cortex generally firing action potentials only once per song. He and his colleagues also found that a brain circuit necessary for song learning also generates the variability in juvenile song. In particular, this circuit is required for the early unstructured vocalizations that resemble babbling in humans.
