= Morgan Chu =

American patent lawyer (born 1950)

- 朱欽文
- Born: December 27, 1950 (age 75)
- Education: University of California, Los Angeles (BA, MA, PhD); Yale University (MSL); Harvard University (JD)
- Occupation: Patent lawyer
- Employer: Irell & Manella
- Father: Ju-Chin Chu
- Relatives: Gilbert Chu (brother); Steven Chu (brother); Shu-tian Li (grandfather)

Morgan Chu (Chinese: 朱欽文; pinyin: Zhū Qìngwén; born December 27, 1950) is an American intellectual property attorney. In June 2009, Harvard alumni elected Chu to a six-year term as a member of the Harvard Board of Overseers.

== Family ==
Morgan Chu's father, Ju-Chin Chu, left China in 1943 to study chemical engineering, earning a doctorate at the Massachusetts Institute of Technology (MIT). He later taught at Washington University in St. Louis and at Brooklyn Polytechnic Institute. Chu's mother Ching Chen Li, also left China during World War II to study economics at MIT. His parents married in 1945 and began a family.

Chu is the youngest of three brothers. His oldest brother, Gilbert Chu, holds an M.D. and a Ph.D., and is a professor of biochemistry and medicine at Stanford University. The middle brother, Steven Chu, was a professor of physics at Stanford and later a professor of physics and molecular and cellular biology at University of California, Berkeley, and the director of Lawrence Berkeley National Laboratory. Steven Chu was awarded the Nobel Prize for Physics in 1997 and was President Obama's Secretary of Energy from January 21, 2009, to April 22, 2013.

== Education ==
Chu dropped out of high school and left home, but by age 25 he had five university degrees. Although he never received a high school diploma, he gained admittance to UCLA, where he earned a B.A. (1971) in political science, and a M.A. (1972) and Ph.D (1973) in urban educational policy planning. Chu then received a Master of Studies in Law from Yale Law School (1974) and a Juris Doctor, magna cum laude, from Harvard Law School (1976).

== Legal career ==
Following his law school graduation, Chu served as a law clerk for Hon. Charles M. Merrill, U.S. Court of Appeals for the Ninth Circuit (1976–1977). In 1977, Chu went to work as an associate at the Los Angeles law firm of Irell & Manella. Chu was elevated to partner in 1982, and became the firm's co-managing partner in 1997, serving two terms until 2003. Chu is known for his many high-profile trials involving technology.

== Public service ==
When Chu was still an undergraduate at UCLA, he co-founded UCLA's Asian American Studies Center. He has previously served on the Board of Governors of the University of California, Los Angeles Foundation.

At Harvard Law School, Chu was an editor of the Harvard Civil Rights-Civil Liberties Law Review.

Since law school, Chu has been a frequent lecturer and teacher. He participated in symposia at Harvard Law School and the Harvard Kennedy School of Government, and he was the Traphagen Distinguished Speaker at Harvard in 2003. Chu served as an adjunct professor at UCLA Law School from 1978 to 1981. He has lectured or delivered papers at Stanford U.C. Berkeley, Georgetown, Northwestern, California Institute of Technology, UCLA, and the University of Southern California, among other venues.

Chu was the founding chair of the U.S.C. Law School's Intellectual Property Law Institute (2004–06), and has served on its Executive Committee since 2004.

Chu serves on the Board and Executive Committee of Public Counsel, the largest pro bono public interest law firm in the world. In one of his pro bono cases, Chu spent six years securing the reversal of a conviction of a death row inmate, the first reversal upheld by the U.S. Supreme Court of a conviction and death penalty in the 20 years since California had reinstated the death penalty.

Chu and his wife Helen have endowed student scholarships at Harvard and UCLA, as well as the Irell & Manella Graduate School of Biological Sciences (IMGSBS) at City of Hope.

In 2021, Chu and his wife Helen donated $1 million to Public Counsel to establish the Helen & Morgan Chu Chief Executive Officer Distinguished Chair. In 2026, Chu and his wife Helen donated $31.4 million to Harvard Law School, the largest in the school's history at the time, establishing an endowment for six professorships.

== Awards and honors ==
Chu has received awards and honors as one of the top attorneys in the United States, as well as for his contributions to higher education and the community. They include:

- Honorary Doctorate, Irell & Manella Graduate School of Biological Sciences
- UCLA Medal (June 2007)
- Top Intellectual Property Lawyer in the United States in the first Chambers Award for Excellence, 2006.
- Distinguished Advocate (2006). The Edward A. Heafey Jr. Center for Trial and Appellate Advocacy at Santa Clara University School of Law each year selects one outstanding trial or appellate lawyer to visit the law school as a "Distinguished Advocate."
- PACE-Setter Award (2004) from the Pacific Asian Consortium in Employment
- Learned Hand Award (2003) from the American Jewish Committee
- "100 Most Influential Lawyers in America" from the National Law Journal
- At the age of 16, Chu and six others participated in the Subway Challenge, setting the Guinness World Record for traveling through every New York City Subway station in the shortest time on one fare: 22 hours 11 1/2 minutes.
