= Stanford PULSE Institute =

American university laboratory

Coordinates: 37°25′12.7″N 122°12′16.46″W

The PULSE Institute (PULSE) is an independent laboratory of Stanford University, founded in 2005 for the purpose of advancing research in ultrafast science, with particular emphasis on research using the Linac Coherent Light Source at the SLAC National Accelerator Laboratory. Recent research programs include Terahertz radiation (sometimes called T-rays) ultrafast studies and attosecond pulse studies. It is housed in the Central Laboratory on the grounds of SLAC, and also utilizes some laboratory space on the main Stanford campus nearby. Philip H. Bucksbaum was named as the first director of PULSE. In 2019 David A. Reis became the PULSE director.

== See also ==
- SLAC National Accelerator Laboratory
- Stanford University Research Centers and Institutes
