= Gilbert Chu =

American biochemist (born 1946)

- 朱築文
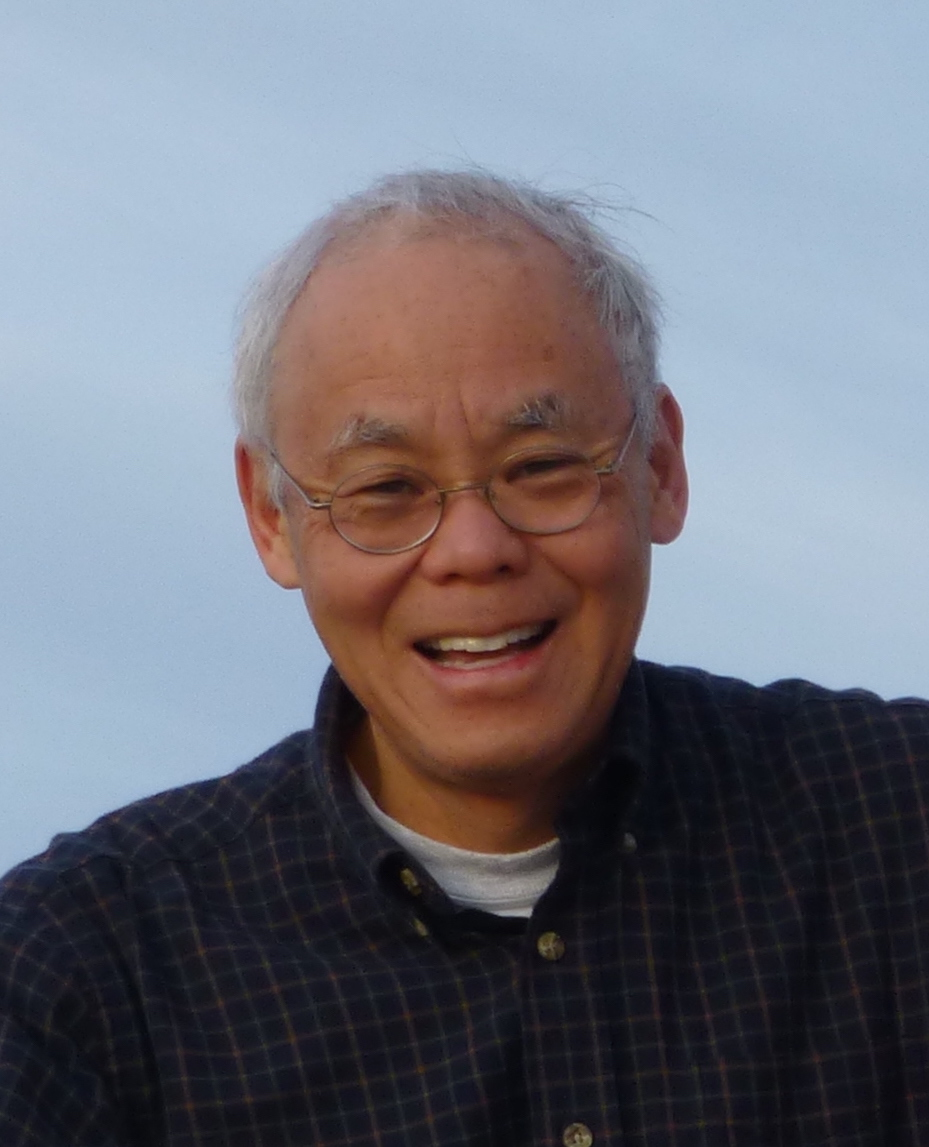
- Born: January 20, 1946 (age 80); Boston, Massachusetts, U.S.
- Education: Princeton University (BA); Massachusetts Institute of Technology (PhD); Harvard University (MD)
- Spouse: Sharon Long (m. 2008)
- Children: 2
- Parents: Ju-Chin Chu (father); Ching-Chen Li (mother)
- Relatives: Shu-tian Li (grandfather); Steven Chu (brother); Morgan Chu (brother)
- Scientific career
- Known for: DNA Repair, Genomics
- Fields: Biochemistry; Physics; Medicine; Molecular Biology; Biophysics
- Institutions: Stanford University
- Theses: Phenomenological dual models (1973); The kinetics of T cell killing: a description by Poisson statistics (1980)
- Doctoral advisors: Francis Eugene Low (1973); Herman Eisen (1980)

Gilbert Chu (Chinese: 朱築文; pinyin: Zhū Zhùwén) is an American biochemist. He is a professor of medicine (oncology) and biochemistry at the Stanford University School of Medicine.

== Biography ==
Chu graduated from Garden City High School in New York in 1963. He received a B.A. in physics from Princeton University in 1967, a Ph.D. in physics from M.I.T. in 1973, and an M.D. from Harvard Medical School in 1980.

Chu joined the Stanford faculty in 1987. His research has investigated how cells react to DNA damage from radiation. He has also developed electroporation techniques, a method for pulsed-field gel electrophoresis, and methods for analyzing microarray data.

== Awards ==
Chu received the Clinical Scientist Award for Translational Research from Burroughs-Wellcome Fund (Wellcome Trust), and the Rita Allen Award from the Rita Allen Foundation. Chu was also elected as a Fellow of the American Physical Society for contributions at the intersection of physics and life sciences, including PET, electrophoresis, and statistical methods for microarrays. His other notable contributions include discovering and characterizing proteins involved in DNA repair and developing instrumentation for assessing toxicity associated with cancer chemotherapy.

== Personal life ==
He married Sharon Rugel Long on August 9, 2008. Chu has two children, Alex and Jason.

His younger brother Steven Chu is a Nobel laureate and the twelfth United States secretary of energy in the Obama administration. His other younger brother is the intellectual property attorney Morgan Chu.

== Publications ==
- Tusher V, Tibshirani R, Chu G "Significance analysis of microarrays applied to the ionizing radiation response" Proc Natl Acad Sci USA 98 (9): 5116–5121 Apr 24, 2001 Times Cited: 12409
- Tibshirani R, Hastie T, Narasimhan B, Chu G, "Diagnosis of multiple cancer types by shrunken centroids of gene expression" Proc Natl Acad Sci USA 99 (10): 6567–6572 May 14, 2002 Times Cited: 2789
- Chu G, Vollrath D, Davis RW, "Separation of large DNA molecules by contour-clamped homogeneous electric fields" Science 234 (4783): 1582–1585 Dec 19, 1986 Times Cited: 1706
- Chu G, Hayakawa H, Berg P "Electroporation for the efficient transfection of mammalian cells with DNA" Nucleic Acids Res 15 (3): 1311–1326 Feb 11 1987 Times Cited: 942
- Chu G, "Cellular responses to cisplatin – the roles of DNA-binding proteins and DNA-repair" J Biol Chem 269 (2): 787–790 Jan 14 1994 Times Cited: 833
- Hwang BJ, Ford JM, Hanawalt PC, Chu G "Expression of the p48 xeroderma pigmentosum gene is p53-dependent and is involved in global genomic repair" Proc Natl Acad Sci USA 96 (2), 424–428 Jan 19 1999 Times Cited: 640
- Chu G, Chang E "Xeroderma pigmentosum group E cells lack a nuclear factor that binds to damaged DNA" Science 242 (4878), 564–567 Times Cited: 425
- Smider V, Rathmell WK, Lieber MR, Chu G "Restoration of X-ray resistance and V (D) J recombination in mutant cells by Ku cDNA" Science 266 (5183): 288–291 Oct 14 1994 Times Cited: 360
- Tang JY, Hwang BJ, Ford JM, et al. "Xeroderma pigmentosum p48 gene enhances global genomic repair and suppresses UV-induced mutagenesis" Molecular Cell 5 (4): 737–744 Apr 30 2000 Times Cited: 337

A complete listing of his publications can be found here.
