= Carol Tanner =

American physicist

Carol Elizabeth Tanner is a retired American physicist whose research involved high-precision measurements of the hyperfine structure of ultracold cesium atoms in order to study parity non-conservation. She has also applied laser transmission spectroscopy to detect DNA and differentiate the DNA of different related species in samples. She is a professor emerita in the Department of Physics & Astronomy at the University of Notre Dame.

== Education and career ==
Tanner studied physics at the University of Illinois Urbana-Champaign, graduating in 1980. She continued her studies in physics at the University of California, Berkeley, where she received a master's degree in 1982 and completed her Ph.D. in 1985. Her doctoral work with Eugene D. Commins resulted in the dissertation Measurement of Stark Amplitudes in the $6\,^2{\!P}_{1/2}\to 7\,^2{\!P}_{1/2}$ Transition of Atomic Thallium.

After postdoctoral research at the University of Colorado and National Institute of Standards and Technology, she became an assistant professor at Notre Dame in 1990. She was promoted to associate professor in 1996 and full professor in 2006. She retired and became professor emerita in 2019.

== Recognition ==
Tanner was named as a Fellow of the American Physical Society (APS) in 2002, after a nomination from the APS Topical Group on Precision Measurement and Fundamental Constants, "for her contributions to the understanding of atomic structure through precision measurements of atomic lifetimes and transition amplitudes". Tanner's work on DNA detection won second place in the 2011 Nanotechnology New Ventures Competition.
