= Sharon R. Long =

American plant biologist (born 1951)

Sharon Long
- Born: Sharon Rugel Long; March 2, 1951 (age 75)
- Education: Harvey Mudd College; California Institute of Technology (BS); Yale University (MS, PhD)
- Known for: bacterial-plant symbiosis
- Spouses: Harold McGee (m. 1979; div. 2004) Gilbert Chu (m. 2008)
- Children: 2
- Awards: Member of the National Academy of Sciences
- Scientific career
- Fields: Plant biology
- Workplaces: Stanford University
- Thesis: Maturation and Germination Programs in Developing Embryos of Phaseolus (1979)
- Notable students: Giles Oldroyd
- Website: profiles.stanford.edu/sharon-long

Sharon Rugel Long (born March 2, 1951) is an American plant biologist. She is the Steere-Pfizer Professor of Biological Science in the Department of Biology at Stanford University, and the Principal Investigator of the Long Laboratory at Stanford.

Long studies the symbiosis between bacteria and plants, in particular the relationship of nitrogen-fixing bacteria to legumes. Her work has applications for energy conservation and sustainable agriculture. She is a 1992 MacArthur Fellows Program recipient, and became a Member of the National Academy of Sciences in 1993.

== Early life and education ==
Sharon Rugel Long was born on March 2, 1951 to Harold Eugene and Florence Jean (Rugel) Long. She attended George Washington High School in Denver, Colorado. Long spent a year at Harvey Mudd College before becoming one of the first women to attend Caltech in September 1970. She completed a double major in biochemistry and French literature in the Independent Studies Program, and obtained her B.S. in 1973.

Long went on to study biochemistry and genetics at Yale, receiving her Ph.D. in 1979. She began her research on plants and symbiosis while a postdoc at Frederick M Ausubel's lab at Harvard University.

== Career and research ==
Long joined the Stanford University faculty in 1982 as an assistant professor, rising to associate professor in 1987, and full professor in 1992. From 1994 to 2001, she was also an Investigator of the Howard Hughes Medical Institute. She currently holds the Steere-Pfizer chair in Biological Sciences at Stanford. She serves on the Board of Directors of Annual Reviews.

From 1993 to 1996, she was part of the National Research Council's Committee on Undergraduate Science Education. She served as Dean of Humanities and Sciences at Stanford University from 2001 to 2007.

In September 2008 she was identified as one of 5 science advisors for Democratic presidential candidate Barack Obama. In 2011, she was appointed to the President's Committee on the National Medal of Science by President Obama.

External videos
- "Legume and Bacteria Symbiosis", Sharon Long (Stanford), iBiology Techniques
- "Nod gene transcription", Sharon Long (Stanford), iBiology Techniques

Long identified and cloned genes that allow bacteria to find and enter certain plants in which they live symbiotically. She has examined the interactions of Rhizobium bacteria with legumes such as alfalfa, soybeans and peas, in which they enhance nitrogen production. She has genetically modified bacteria to make them more effective at entering host plants and producing nitrogen. Such initiatives may enable farmers to reduce nitrogen fertilizer use and runoff of fertilizer into local water supplies.

Her current research uses molecular, genetic, and biochemical techniques to study the early stages of symbiosis between Sinorhizobium meliloti and its host plants in the genus Medicago. Rhizobium cells recognize and form nodules on their plant hosts. Her group discovered that a flavone (luteolin) derived from alfalfa seed extracts is necessary for activation of nodulation genes (nod ABC) in Sinorhizobium meliloti. They proved that some nod genes encode enzymes that synthesize Nod Factor. They discovered that plant root hair cells show rapid ionic changes including calcium spiking in response to specific Nod Factors. With colleagues, they have identified plant genes for symbiosis, and correlated these with specific stages in nodule development.

=== Selected publications ===
- Peters, NK; Frost, JW; Long, SR (29 August 1986). "A plant flavone, luteolin, induces expression of Rhizobium meliloti nodulation genes". Science. 233 (4767): 977–80. Bibcode:1986Sci...233..977P. doi:10.1126/science.3738520. PMID 3738520.
- Long, SR (27 January 1989). "Rhizobium-legume nodulation: life together in the underground". Cell. 56 (2): 203–14. doi:10.1016/0092-8674(89)90893-3. PMID 2643474. S2CID 1055437.
- Schwedock, J; Long, SR (13 December 1990). "ATP sulphurylase activity of the nodP and nodQ gene products of Rhizobium meliloti". Nature. 348 (6302): 644–7. Bibcode:1990Natur.348..644S. doi:10.1038/348644a0. PMID 2250719. S2CID 4318180.

=== Awards and honors ===
- 1984–1989, Presidential Young Investigator Award, National Science Foundation
- 1985, Shell Research Foundation Award
- 1989, Charles Albert Shull Award, American Society of Plant Physiology
- 1992, MacArthur Foundation Fellowship
- 1993, member, National Academy of Sciences
- 1994, fellow, American Academy of Arts and Sciences
- 2000, member, American Philosophical Society
- 2002, Wilbur Cross Medal in Biology, Yale Graduate School of Arts and Sciences (highest alumni honor)
- 2007, fellow, American Society of Plant Biologists
- 2019 Selman A. Waksman Award in Microbiology
- Recognized as a Pioneer Member of the American Society of Plant Biologists.

== Personal life ==
Long married Harold James McGee on July 7, 1979, and divorced in 2004. They had two children.
