= Current Protocols =

Current Protocols is a series of laboratory manuals for life scientists. The first title, Current Protocols in Molecular Biology, was established in 1987 by the founding editors Frederick M. Ausubel, Roger Brent, Robert Kingston, David Moore, Jon Seidman, Kevin Struhl, and John A. Smith of the Massachusetts General Hospital Department of Molecular Biology and the Harvard Medical School Departments of Genetics and Biological Chemistry, and Sarah Greene of Greene Publishing Associates The Current Protocols series entered into a partnership with Wiley-Interscience, John Wiley and Sons, was acquired by Wiley in 1995, and continued to introduce additional titles. Scientists contribute methods that are peer-reviewed by one of 18 editorial boards. The core content of each title is updated quarterly, and new material is added. In 2009, the Current Protocols website was launched, with online versions of all of the texts, research tools, video protocols, and a blog. Several Current Protocols titles are indexed in MEDLINE and searchable by PubMed: CP Molecular Biology, CP Immunology, CP Cell Biology, CP Protein Science, CP Microbiology.

== Titles ==
As of April 2023 the series comprised:

- Current Protocols in Bioinformatics
- Current Protocols in Cell Biology
- Current Protocols in Chemical Biology
- Current Protocols in Cytometry
- Current Protocols in Essential Laboratory Techniques
- Current Protocols in Food Analytical Chemistry
- Current Protocols in Human Genetics
- Current Protocols in Immunology
- Current Protocols in Magnetic Resonance Imaging
- Current Protocols in Microbiology
- Current Protocols in Molecular Biology
- Current Protocols in Mouse Biology
- Current Protocols in Neuroscience
- Current Protocols in Nucleic Acid Chemistry
- Current Protocols in Pharmacology
- Current Protocols in Plant Biology
- Current Protocols in Protein Science
- Current Protocols in Stem Cell Biology
- Current Protocols in Toxicology
