= Garden City High School (New York) =

Public high school in Nassau County, New York, United States

- Garden City High School in 2026

Location
- 170 Rockaway Avenue; Garden City, New York 11530; United States; 40°43′58″N 73°39′11″W

Information
- Type: Public high school
- Motto: "Inspiring Minds, Empowering Achievement, Building Community"
- Established: 1925 (101 years ago) (at current location since 1955 (71 years ago))
- School district: Garden City Union Free School District
- NCES School ID: 3611760
- Principal: Kevin Steingruebner
- Teaching staff: 97.75 FTEs
- Grades: 9–12
- Enrollment: 1,096 (as of 2024–2025)
- Student to teacher ratio: 11.21
- Colors: Maroon and grey
- Publication: Mast, Inkspots (previously Ink Spots), Echo
- Website: gchs.gardencity.k12.ny.us

Garden City High School (GCHS) is the public high school located within the Incorporated Village of Garden City in the Town of Hempstead, in Nassau County, New York, United States.

In 2016, Garden City High School was ranked the #121 school in the nation by U.S. News & World Report.

== Statistics ==
As of the 2018–19 school year, the school had an enrollment of 1,188 students and 94.5 classroom teachers (on an FTE basis), for a student–teacher ratio of 12.6:1. There were 46 students (3.9% of enrollment) eligible for free lunch and 4 (0.3% of students) eligible for reduced-cost lunch.

== Notable alumni ==
Academia

- Gilbert Chu, biochemist and oncologist at Stanford University
- R. Inslee Clark Jr., dean of undergraduate admissions, Yale University

The arts

- Liza Huber, actress; daughter of actress Susan Lucci
- Joe Iconis, musical-theater writer; 2019 Tony Award nominee for Be More Chill
- Susan Lucci (class of 1964), actress, star of All My Children television soap opera
- John Tesh, pianist, composer

Broadcast journalism

- Greg Kelly, talk radio host, former Good Day New York host
- Lara Spencer (class of 1987), television journalist, co-anchor of Good Morning America,
- John Tesh, radio host and television presenter

Finance

- John J. Phelan Jr., former chairman and chief executive officer of the New York Stock Exchange

Government

- Michael Balboni, former deputy secretary for Public Safety for the State of New York, New York state senator and state assemblyman; 11th President of Adelphi University
- Steven Chu (born 1948; class of 1966), former U.S. secretary of energy and 1997 Nobel Prize in Physics laureate
- John R. Dunne, former U.S. Assistant Attorney General for Civil Rights and New York state senator
- Kashyap "Kash" Patel, Federal Bureau of Investigation director, attorney, former congressional aide, and federal government official; graduated in 1998.
- Kathleen Rice, former U.S. representative for New York's 4th congressional district and former Nassau County District Attorney

Literature

- Sarah Langan (class of 1992), horror writer
- Sarah Smith, author of mysteries and science fiction

Science

- Gilbert Chu, biochemist and oncologist at Stanford University
- Michael Wigler, geneticist at the Cold Spring Harbor Laboratory

Sports

- Carl Braun, professional basketball player for the New York Knicks
- Matt Daley, New York Yankees relief pitcher
- Dave Jennings, National Football League punter and football analyst
- Don McCauley, All-American running back at North Carolina Tar Heels football, Baltimore Colts, College Football Hall of Fame

Miscellaneous

- John Chatterton, commercial scuba diver; subject of the bestselling book Shadow Divers

== Notable faculty ==
- Irvin Faust, novelist and short-story writer; director of guidance, 1960–1995
