= Steven Chu =

American physicist and government official (born 1948)

Steven Chu FREng ForMemRS HonFInstP
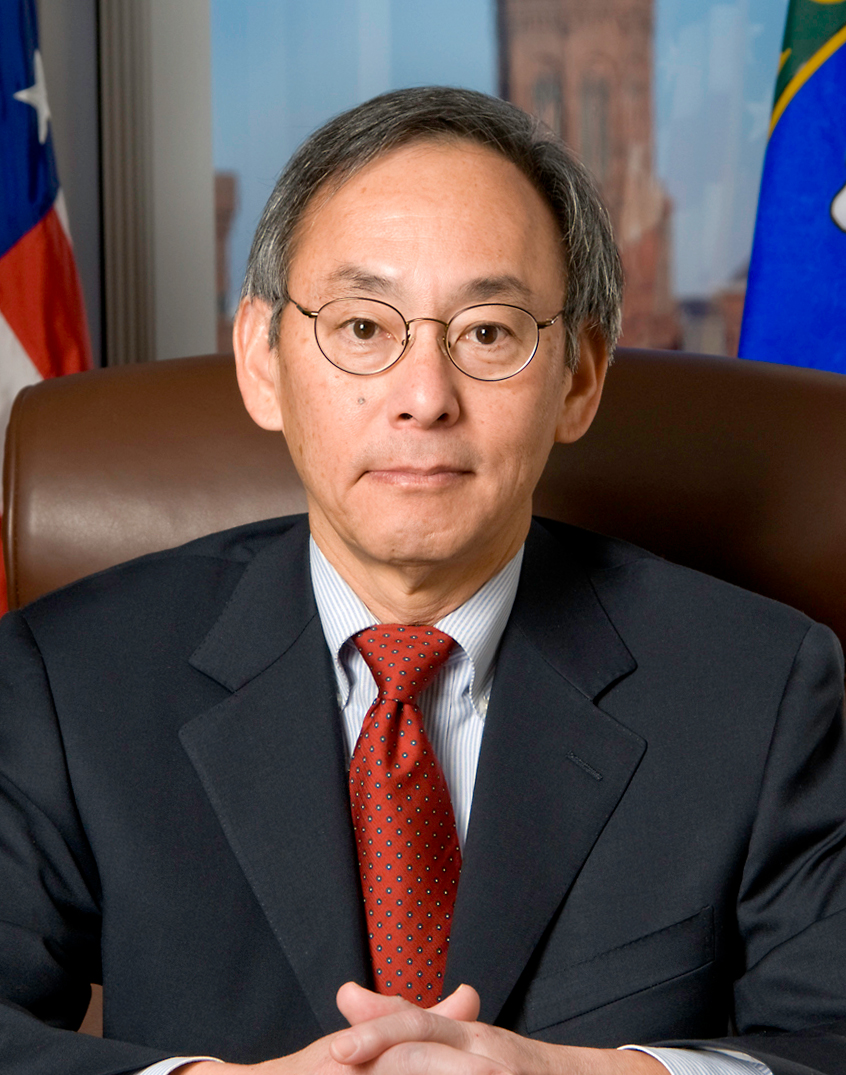
- Official portrait, 2009

12th United States Secretary of Energy
- In office January 21, 2009 – April 22, 2013
- President: Barack Obama
- Deputy: Daniel Poneman
- Preceded by: Samuel Bodman
- Succeeded by: Ernest Moniz

Personal details
- Born: February 28, 1948 (age 78) St. Louis, Missouri, U.S.
- Party: Democratic
- Spouse(s): Lisa Chu-Thielbar (divorced) Jean Fetter (m. 1997)
- Children: 2
- Parent: Ju-Chin Chu (father)
- Relatives: Gilbert Chu (brother); Morgan Chu (brother); Shu-tian Li (grandfather)
- Education: University of Rochester (BA, BS); University of California, Berkeley (MS, PhD)
- Awards: Nobel Prize in Physics (1997)
- Scientific career
- Fields: Atomic physics, biological physics, polymer physics
- Workplaces: Bell Labs; Stanford University; Lawrence Berkeley National Laboratory
- Thesis: Observation of the Forbidden Magnetic Dipole Transition 6^{2}P_{1/2}→7^{2}P_{1/2} in Atomic Thallium (1976)
- Doctoral advisor: Eugene D. Commins
- Doctoral students: Michale Fee

Chinese name
- Chinese: 朱棣文
- Hanyu Pinyin: Zhū Dìwén

Steven Chu FREng ForMemRS HonFInstP (Chinese: 朱棣文; born February 28, 1948) is an American physicist and former government official. He is a Nobel laureate and was the 12th U.S. secretary of energy. He is currently the William R. Kenan Jr. Professor of Physics and Professor of Molecular and Cellular Physiology at Stanford University. He is known for his research at the University of California, Berkeley and Stanford University. Additionally, for his research at Bell Laboratories regarding the cooling and trapping of atoms with laser light, he shared the 1997 Nobel Prize in Physics with Claude Cohen-Tannoudji and William Daniel Phillips.

Chu served as U.S. Secretary of Energy under the Barack Obama administration from 2009 to 2013. At the time of his appointment as Energy Secretary, Chu was a professor of physics and molecular and cellular biology at the University of California, Berkeley, and the director of the Lawrence Berkeley National Laboratory, where his research was concerned primarily with the study of biological systems at the single molecule level. Chu resigned as energy secretary on April 22, 2013. He returned to Stanford as Professor of Physics, Molecular & Cellular Physiology, and Energy Science and Engineering.

Chu is a vocal advocate for more research into renewable energy and nuclear power, arguing that a shift away from fossil fuels is essential to combating climate change. He has conceived of a global "glucose economy", a form of a low-carbon economy, in which glucose from tropical plants is shipped around like oil is today. Chu served a one-year term as President of the American Association for the Advancement of Science starting from February 22, 2019.

== Early life and education ==
Chu was born on February 28, 1948, in St. Louis, Missouri, with Chinese ancestry from Liuhe, Taicang, China. He attended Garden City High School in Garden City, New York. He received both a B.A. in mathematics and a B.S. in physics in 1970 from the University of Rochester and earned his Ph.D. in physics from the University of California, Berkeley, under Eugene D. Commins, in 1976, during which he was supported by a National Science Foundation Graduate Research Fellowship.

Chu comes from a family of highly educated white collar professionals and scholars. His father, Ju-Chin Chu, earned a doctorate in chemical engineering from MIT and taught at Washington University in St. Louis and Brooklyn Polytechnic Institute, and his mother studied economics at MIT. His maternal grandfather, Shu-tian Li, was a hydraulic engineer who earned a Ph.D. from Cornell University, and was a professor and president of Tianjin University. His mother's uncle, Li Shu-hua, a biophysicist, attended the University of Paris before returning to China.

Chu's older brother, Gilbert Chu, is a professor of biochemistry and medicine at Stanford University. His younger brother, Morgan Chu, is a patent lawyer who is the former co-managing partner at the law firm Irell & Manella. According to Chu, his two brothers and four cousins have four PhDs, three MDs, and a JD among themselves.

== Career and research ==
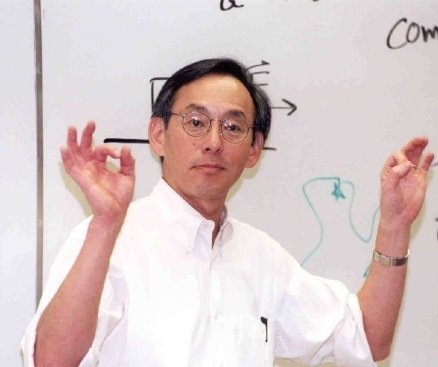
Chu lecturing

After obtaining his doctorate, he remained at Berkeley as a postdoctoral researcher for two years before joining Bell Labs, where he and his several co-workers carried out his Nobel Prize–winning laser cooling work. He left Bell Labs and became a professor of physics at Stanford University in 1987, serving as the chair of its physics department from 1990 to 1993 and from 1999 to 2001. At Stanford, Chu and three others initiated the Bio-X program, which focuses on interdisciplinary research in biology and medicine, and played a key role in securing the funding for the Kavli Institute for Particle Astrophysics and Cosmology. In August 2004, Chu was appointed as the director of the Lawrence Berkeley National Laboratory, a U.S. Department of Energy National Laboratory, and joined UC Berkeley's department of physics and department of molecular and cell biology. Under Chu's leadership, the Lawrence Berkeley National Laboratory was a center of research into biofuels and solar energy. He spearheaded the laboratory's Helios project, an initiative to develop methods of harnessing solar power as a source of renewable energy for transportation.

Chu's early research focused on atomic physics by developing laser cooling techniques and the magneto-optical trapping of atoms using lasers. He and his co-workers at Bell Labs developed a way to cool atoms by employing six laser beams opposed in pairs and arranged in three directions at right angles to each other. Trapping atoms with this method allows scientists to study individual atoms with great accuracy. Additionally, the technique can be used to construct an atomic clock with great precision.

At Stanford, Chu's research interests expanded into biological physics and polymer physics at the single-molecule level. He studied enzyme activity and protein and RNA folding using techniques like fluorescence resonance energy transfer, atomic force microscopy, and optical tweezers. His polymer physics research used individual DNA molecules to study polymer dynamics and their phase transitions. He continued researching atomic physics as well and developed new methods of laser cooling and trapping. As of 2022, he is the President of the Scientific Committee of ESPCI Paris.

== Honors and awards ==
Steven Chu was awarded the Nobel Prize in Physics in 1997 for the "development of methods to cool and trap atoms with laser light", together with Claude Cohen-Tannoudji and William Daniel Phillips.

He is a member of the U.S. National Academy of Sciences, the American Academy of Arts and Sciences, the American Philosophical Society, the Pontifical Academy of Sciences and the Academia Sinica of Taiwan, and is a foreign member of the Chinese Academy of Sciences and the Korean Academy of Science and Engineering. In 1994, The Optical Society recognized Chu with the William F. Meggers Award. The Society later elected him an Honorary Member. He was also awarded the Humboldt Prize by the Alexander von Humboldt Foundation in 1995. In 1998, Chu received the Golden Plate Award of the American Academy of Achievement.

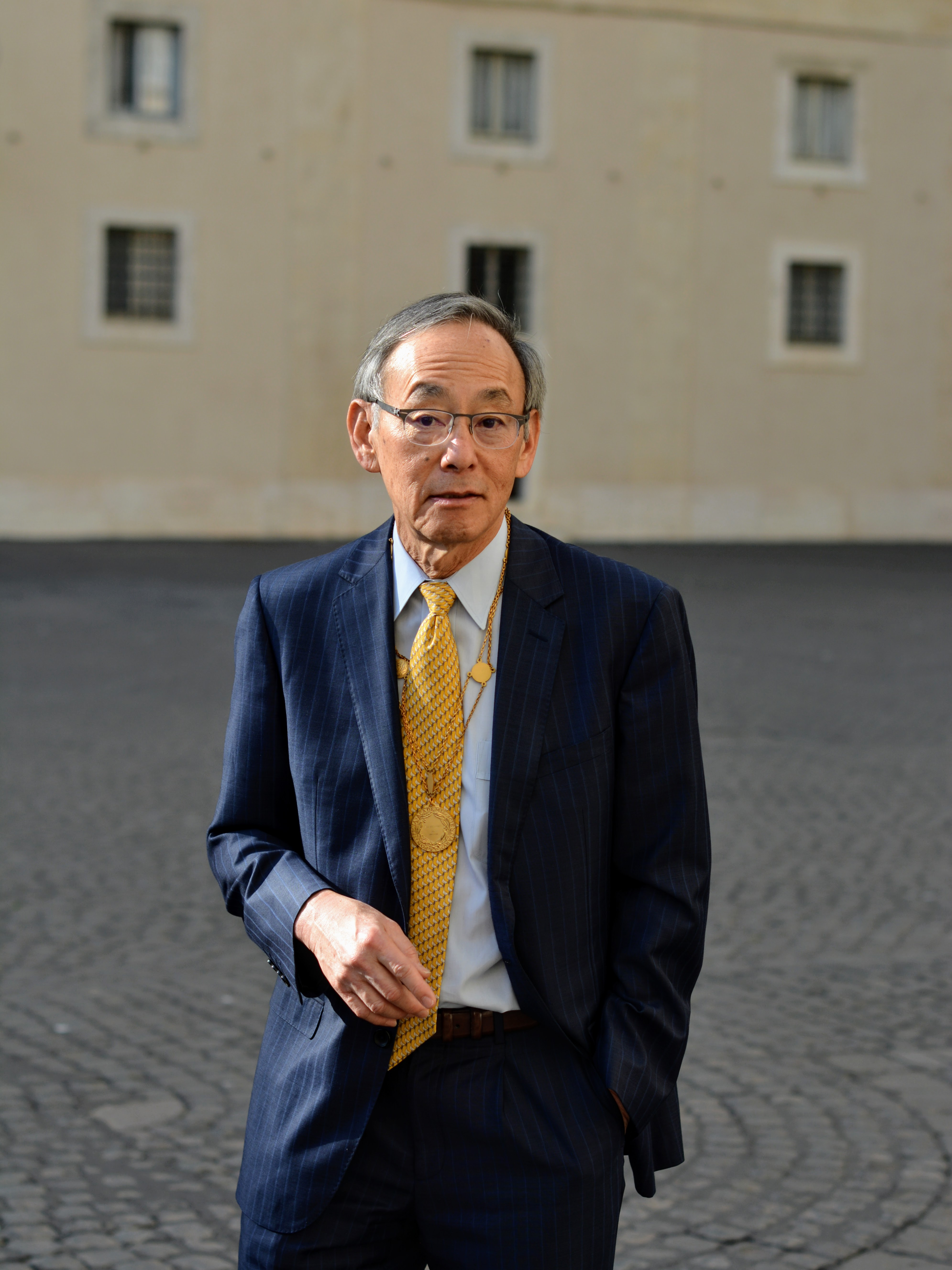
Chu with his medal as a Pontifical Academician, 2018

Chu received an honorary doctorate from Boston University when he was the keynote speaker at the 2007 commencement exercises. He is a senior fellow of the Design Futures Council. Diablo Magazine awarded him an Eco Award in its April 2009 issue, shortly after he was nominated for Energy Secretary.

Washington University in St. Louis and Harvard University awarded him honorary doctorates during their 2010 and 2009 commencement exercises, respectively. He was awarded an honorary degree from Yale University during its 2010 commencement. He was also awarded an honorary degree from the Polytechnic Institute of New York University, the same institution at which his father taught for several years, during its 2011 commencement. Penn State University awarded him an honorary doctorate during their 2012 commencement exercises. In 2014, Chu was awarded an honorary doctorate from Williams College, during which he gave a talk moderated by Williams College Professor Protik Majumder. He was awarded an honorary doctorate from Dartmouth College during its 2015 commencement. Chu was also awarded an honorary doctorate from Amherst College in 2017, where he later gave a lecture titled "Climate Change and Needed Technical Solutions for a Sustainable Future" in March 2018.

Chu was elected an international fellow of the Royal Academy of Engineering UK in 2011, and a Foreign Member of the Royal Society (ForMemRS) in 2014. His nomination reads:

Steven Chu's development of methods to laser cool and trap atoms was recognized by the award of the Nobel Prize in Physics in 1997. He also pioneered the development of atom interferometry for precision measurement, and he introduced methods to visualize and manipulate single bio-molecules simultaneously with optical tweezers. Throughout his career, he has sought new solutions to the energy and climate challenges. From January 2009 to April 2013, he was the 12th U.S. Secretary of Energy under President Barack Obama, and initiated the Advanced Research Projects Agency – Energy, the Energy Innovation Hubs, and the Clean Energy Ministerial meetings.

Steven Chu was named the winner of the 2024 American Institute of Physics Karl Compton Medal, named after prominent physicist Karl Taylor Compton. The medal is now presented by AIP every two years to highly distinguished physicists who have made outstanding contributions to physics through exceptional statesmanship in science.

== U.S. Secretary of Energy ==
Chu's nomination to be Secretary of Energy was unanimously confirmed by the U.S. Senate on January 20, 2009. On January 21, 2009, Chu was sworn in as Secretary of Energy in the Barack Obama administration. Chu is the first person appointed to the U.S. Cabinet after having won a Nobel Prize. He is also the second Chinese American to be a member of the U.S. Cabinet, after former Secretary of Commerce Gary Locke.

In February 2009, Chu visited China where he and China's Minister of Science and Technology Wan Gang announced the US-China Clean Energy Research Center (CERC).

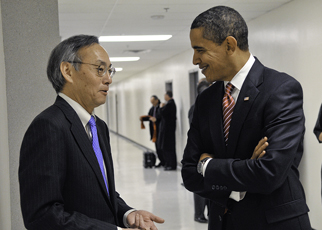
Chu meeting with Obama, February 5, 2009

Chu's scientific work continued, however, and he even published a paper on gravitational redshift in Nature in February 2010 and another one he co-authored in July 2010.

In March 2011, Chu said that regulators at the U.S. Nuclear Regulatory Commission should not delay approving construction licenses for planned U.S. nuclear power plants in the wake of the Fukushima Daiichi nuclear disaster in Japan.

In August 2011, Chu praised an advisory panel report on curbing the environmental risks of natural gas development. Chu responded to the panel's report on hydraulic fracturing, the controversial drilling method that is enabling a U.S. gas boom while bringing fears of groundwater contamination. The report called for better data collection of air and water data, as well as "rigorous" air pollution standards and mandatory disclosure of the chemicals used in the hydraulic fracturing process. Chu said that he would "be working closely with my colleagues in the Administration to review the recommendations and to chart a path for continued development of this vital energy resource in a safe manner".

Chu faced controversy for a statement he made prior to being appointed, claiming in a September 2008 interview with the Wall Street Journal that "somehow we have to figure out how to boost the price of gasoline to the levels in Europe." However, in March 2012, he retracted this comment, saying "..since I walked in the door as Secretary of Energy I've been doing everything in my powers to do what we can to ... reduce those prices" and that he "no longer shares the view [that we need to figure out how to boost gasoline prices in America]".

On February 12, 2013, Chu was the designated survivor during the State of the Union address.

On February 1, 2013, Chu announced his intent to resign. In his resignation announcement, he warned of the risks of climate change from continued reliance on fossil fuels, and wrote, "the Stone Age did not end because we ran out of stones; we transitioned to better solutions". He resigned on April 22, 2013.

== Energy and climate change ==
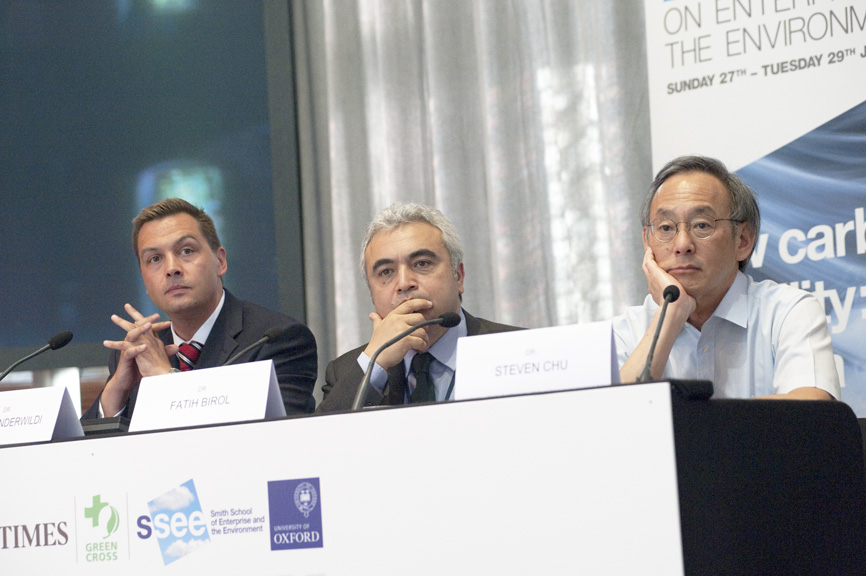
Chu (right) with IEA Executive Director Fatih Birol (middle) and Oliver Inderwildi (left) at the Oxford Union, 2010

Chu has been a vocal advocate for more research into renewable energy and nuclear power, arguing that a shift away from fossil fuels is essential to combat climate change and global warming. He also spoke at the 2009 and 2011 National Science Bowl about the importance of America's science students, emphasizing their future role in environmental planning and global initiative. Chu said that a typical coal power plant emits 100 times more radiation than a nuclear power plant.

Chu has warned that global warming could wipe out California farms within the century.

Chu joined the Copenhagen Climate Council, an international collaboration between business and science established to create momentum for the 2009 UN Climate Change Conference in Copenhagen, Denmark.

In 2015, Chu signed the Mainau Declaration 2015 on Climate Change on the final day of the 65th Lindau Nobel Laureate Meeting. The declaration was signed by a total of 76 Nobel Laureates and handed to then-President of the French Republic, François Hollande, as part of the successful COP21 climate summit in Paris.

Chu was instrumental in submitting a winning bid for the Energy Biosciences Institute, a BP-funded $500 million multidisciplinary collaboration between UC Berkeley, the Lawrence Berkeley Lab, and the University of Illinois. This sparked controversy on the Berkeley campus, where some fear the alliance could harm the school's reputation for academic integrity.

Based partially on his research at UC Berkeley, Chu has speculated that a global "glucose economy", a form of a low-carbon economy, could replace the current system. In the future, special varieties of high-glucose plants would be grown in the tropics, processed, and then the chemical would be shipped around like oil is today to other countries. The St. Petersburg Times has stated that Chu's concept "shows vision on the scale needed to deal with global warming".

Chu has also advocated making the roofs of buildings and the tops of roads around the world white or other light colors, which may reflect sunlight back into space and mitigate global warming. The effect would be, according to Chu, similar to taking every car in the world off the roads for about 11 years. Samuel Thernstrom, a resident fellow at the American Enterprise Institute and co-director of its Geoengineering Project, expressed support for the idea in The American, praising Chu for "do[ing] the nation a service" with the concept. Chu is on the board of directors of Xyleco, a company developing alternate energy.

== Personal life ==
In 1997, he married Jean Fetter, a British-American Oxford-trained physicist. He has two sons, Geoffrey and Michael, from a previous marriage to Lisa Chu-Thielbar.

Chu is interested in sports such as baseball, swimming, and cycling. He taught himself tennis—by reading a book—in the eighth grade and was a second-string substitute for the school team for three years. He also taught himself how to pole vault using bamboo poles obtained from the local carpet store. Chu said he never learned to speak Chinese because his parents always spoke to their children in English.

== See also ==
- Energy policy of the United States
- List of Nobel Laureates affiliated with the University of Rochester
- Timeline of low-temperature technology
- United States Department of Energy
- University of Rochester

Political offices
Preceded by Samuel Bodman	United States Secretary of Energy; 2009–2013	Succeeded by Ernest Moniz
U.S. order of precedence (ceremonial)
Preceded by Tom Vilsack as Former U.S. Cabinet Member	Order of precedence of the United States as Former U.S. Cabinet Member	Succeeded by Arne Duncan as Former U.S. Cabinet Member
