= Shu-tien Li =

Chinese American educator and engineer

- 李書田
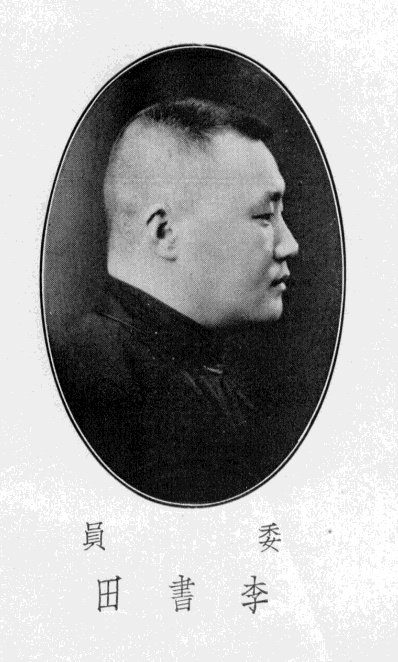
- Born: February 10, 1900; Qing empire
- Died: March 28, 1988 (aged 88); Rapid City, South Dakota, U.S.
- Occupation: Hydraulic engineer
- Relatives: Li Shu-hua (brother)
- Awards: Order of Victory of Resistance Against Aggression

Academic background
- Education: Cornell University PhD (1926)

Academic work
- Discipline: Hydraulic engineering
- Institutions: Peiyang University; Northern China Hydraulic Commission in 1928; Chinese Hydraulic Engineering Society; Tangshan College of Engineering

Shu-tian Li (Shu-tien Li; Chinese: 李書田) (1900–1988) was a Chinese-American hydraulic engineer.

== Life and career ==
After receiving a Ph.D. degree in engineering and economics from Cornell University in 1926, Li returned to China to assume a professorship at the Peiyang University. He became the executive officer of Northern China Hydraulic Commission in 1928. He was a founder of the Chinese Hydraulic Engineering Society and served as its deputy president and then president for six terms. Later he was appointed to lead the Yellow River Commission.

At the age of 28, Li was chosen as the president of Tangshan College of Engineering and became the youngest college administrator in China. In 1932, he was named the President of the Peiyang Engineering College. He was the longest serving president in Peiyang's first 56 years of history. Under his leadership, Peiyang established one of the first graduate engineering programs and the first hydraulic engineering laboratory in China. Between 1937 and 1949, he led the establishment of several national colleges and universities in western and southwestern China (e.g. 西北联大, 国立西北工学院, 西康技艺专科学校, 贵阳农工学院, 贵州大学 and 北洋西京分院). During his leadership at the Si-kang Institute of Technology, the Panzhihua Mine, one of the largest iron (and rare metal) deposits in the world, was discovered. In recognition of his contribution to hydraulic engineering and to China during World War II, Li was awarded a First Order Hydraulic Gold Medal and an Order of Victory of Resistance Against Aggression, respectively, from the Chinese government after the war. He was elected to the National Peking Academy of Sciences in 1948. He published many research papers and books on the management and improvement of the nation's water resources, Yellow River basin and northern China harbor. Among these publications, "The Chinese Hydraulic Issues" (《中国水利问题》), the first comprehensive review and scientific recommendation regarding Chinese water resources, established him as the leading hydraulic engineering authority in China in the 1940s.

Li returned to the United States in 1950 to start private engineering practice and academic teaching/research. The Chinese Institute of Engineers (CIE) awarded Li the CIE annual award in 1963 for his work on the Unified Energy-Matrix Analysis. For his contribution to concrete engineering, he received the highest award from the American Concrete Institute in 1985. He also served on a US congressional advisory board. He was credited with establishing the Phi Tau Phi Scholastic Honor Society of America. He published 17 books and more than 800 research papers during his lifetime. Li died at the age of 88. He was an active philatelist and a devout Southern Baptist during his life.

== Personal life ==
His brother, Shu-hua Li or Li Shu-hua (李书华) was a biophysicist, a former Secretary of Education in China, and contributed to the founding of UNESCO. Li was the maternal grandfather of Gilbert Chu, a biochemist and professor of biochemistry at Stanford University, Steven Chu, a physicist who was the 1997 Nobel Prize winner in physics and the U.S. Secretary of Energy in the Obama Administration and Morgan Chu, a patent lawyer.
