= Xyleco =

American science and alternative energy company

- Founded: 1994
- Founder: Marshall Medoff
- Headquarters: Wakefield, Massachusetts
- Website: http://www.xyleco.com

Xyleco is a privately held scientific research and manufacturing company in Wakefield, Massachusetts. Xyleco is developing a process to convert biomass into useful products, including cellulosic ethanol. The board of directors includes Steven Chu. Former US Secretary of State George Shultz was a board member until his death in February 2021.

Xyleco's process involves using ionizing radiation from an electron particle accelerator to break apart cellulose molecules. Accelerators are energy-intensive, but treatment times are short.

== History ==
According to a 2019 story on "60 Minutes", the company was started by Marshall Medoff, a then 81-year old without a formal science education. He got his inspiration by spending time at Walden Pond, and studying research papers in a storage facility for 15 years. During that time, he was granted over 300 patents. Several 2002 patents were for plastic-cellulose-fiber composites expected to be stronger than ordinary plastic based on resins and wood fiber. In 2004, Rubbermaid agreed to work with Xyleco to develop a material that would be stronger and cheaper than current materials.

In 2009, Medoff hired his first employee, Craig Masterman, an MIT graduate in chemistry. Using $45 million from investors, they built a testing laboratory in Wakefield, Massachusetts, in March 2015.

Marshall Medoff died on November 17, 2021.

== Company reputation ==
Xyleco came to public attention in January 2019, when Lesley Stahl did a "60 Minutes" piece lauding Medoff as an eccentric but remarkably successful inventor. Two months later, Lux Research published a review stating that "Lux views Xyleco with a great deal of skepticism... [G]iven its incorrect claims regarding the bioeconomy, exorbitantly expensive patent portfolio, unclear technology development history, and esteemed yet unrelated board, Lux believes that Xyleco is likely a scam."

== See also ==
- Cellulosic ethanol
- Cellulosic ethanol commercialization
