= Frederick M. Ausubel =

American molecular biologist

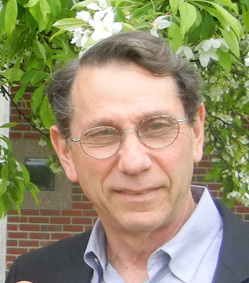
- Frederick M. Ausubel
- Born: September 2, 1945 (age 81)
- Education: University of Illinois (BS); Massachusetts Institute of Technology (PhD)
- Known for: Genetics, Host pathogenesis
- Awards: Thomas Hunt Morgan Medal (2014)
- Scientific career
- Fields: Biology
- Workplaces: Harvard Medical School; Massachusetts General Hospital
- Notable students: Sharon R. Long; Joanne Chory; Gary Ruvkun

Frederick Michael Ausubel (born September 2, 1945) is an American molecular biologist and professor of genetics at Harvard Medical School in Boston and is the Karl Winnacker Distinguished Investigator in the Department of Molecular Biology, Massachusetts General Hospital, Boston, Massachusetts.

== Education ==
Ausubel received a Bachelor of Science with a major in chemistry from the University of Illinois in 1966. He received a PhD in biology from the Massachusetts Institute of Technology in 1972.

== Research ==
Ausubel's scientific work concerns host-microbe interactions. In the 1970s and 1980s, his laboratory worked on the molecular basis of symbiotic nitrogen fixation, the process by which legumes, in concert with a bacterial symbiont, convert atmospheric nitrogen into ammonia. One of his post-docs during this time was Sharon R. Long. Over the last 20 years, Ausubel's lab has worked on the development of so-called multi-host pathogenesis systems that involve the infection of hosts, including the well-studied nematode Caenorhabditis elegans and the reference plant Arabidopsis thaliana, with a variety of bacterial and fungal pathogens. His research helped elucidate the innate immune signaling pathways in these two model hosts and determined which aspects of the innate immune response are conserved and whether they were derived by a process of divergent or convergent evolution. His laboratory currently uses the C. elegans pathogenesis model to study intestinal epithelial immunity and how hosts distinguish pathogens from beneficial commensal microorganisms. Related work in his laboratory concerns the identification and characterization of low molecular weight compounds that specifically activate C. elegans immune signaling pathways. His laboratory assembled an automated C. elegans sample preparation pipeline to enable high-throughput chemical screens using whole animals based on automated image analysis.

As of 2013, Ausubel had published 215 refereed scientific articles. In addition to serving on a variety of editorial boards, Ausubel is founding editor of Current Protocols in Molecular Biology.

== Awards and honors ==
Ausubel was elected as a member of the National Academy of Sciences in 1994, the American Academy of Microbiology in 2002 and also the American Academy of Arts and Sciences in 2003.

Ausubel received the 2014, Thomas Hunt Morgan Medal, for lifetime achievement in the field of genetics.

Ausubel has been recognized as a Pioneer Member of the American Society of Plant Biologists.
