= Persis Drell =

American physicist and academic administrator

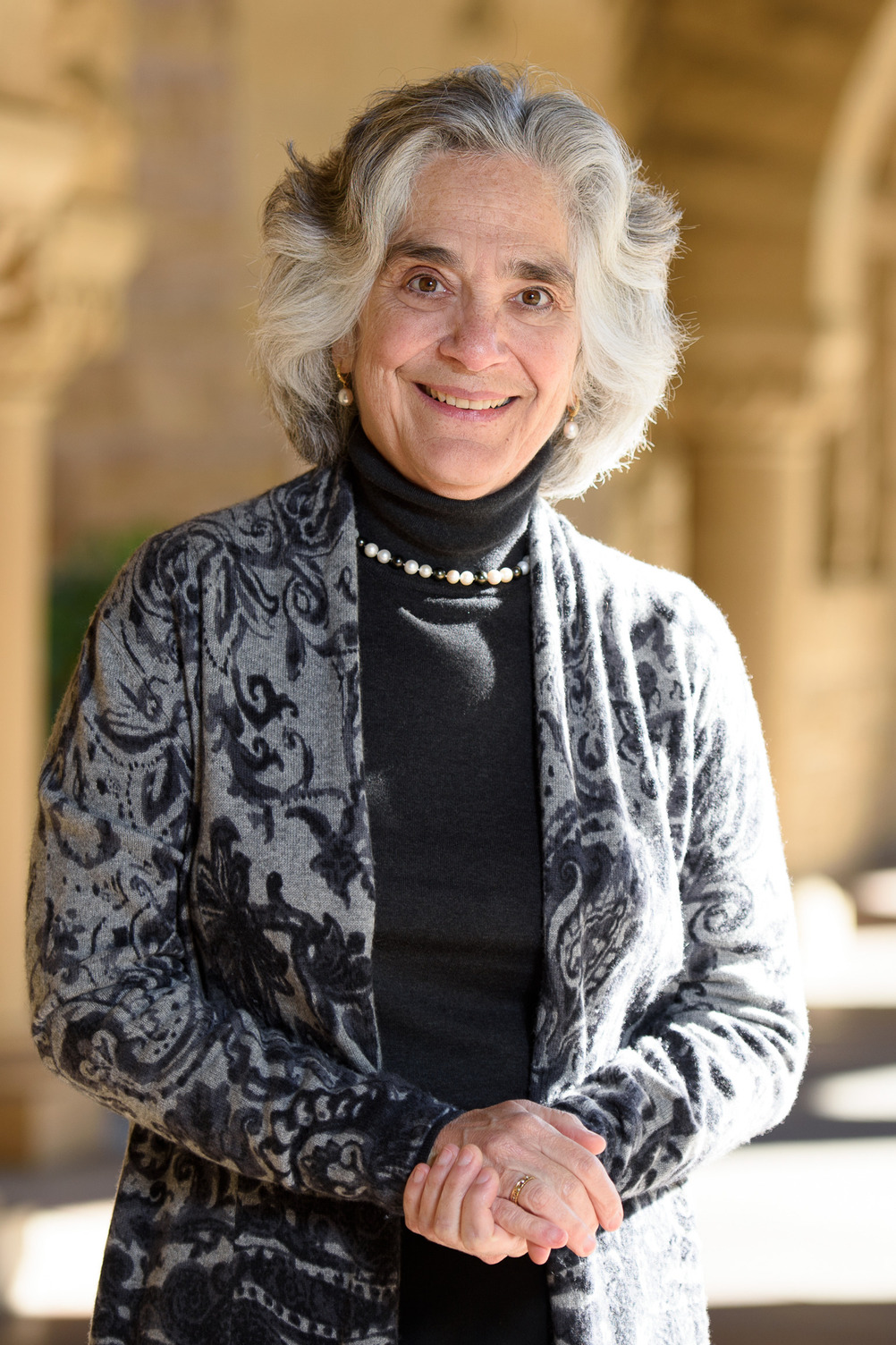
- Born: 1955 (age 70–71); Boston, Massachusetts, U.S.
- Education: Wellesley College (BA); University of California, Berkeley (PhD)
- Spouse: Jim Welch
- Father: Sidney Drell
- Scientific career
- Fields: Particle physics; particle astrophysics; X-ray FEL technology
- Workplaces: Stanford University School of Engineering; Cornell University; Stanford Linear Accelerator Center; Lawrence Berkeley National Laboratory
- Thesis: Parity nonconservation in atomic thallium: the magnetic-field experiment (1983)
- Doctoral advisor: Eugene Commins

Persis Sydney Drell (born 1955) is an American physicist who is the provost emerita and the James and Anna Marie Spilker Professor in the Stanford University School of Engineering, where she is also a professor of materials science and engineering, and a professor of physics. Prior to her appointment as provost, she was dean of the Stanford School of Engineering from 2014 to 2017 and director of the US Department of Energy’s SLAC National Acceleratory Laboratory from 2007 to 2012. In 2025, she was elected to the American Philosophical Society.

== Early life and education ==
Drell was born in 1955 in Boston, Massachusetts. The daughter of noted physicist Sidney Drell, Persis moved to Stanford when she was six months old. She earned her bachelor's degree in mathematics and physics in 1977 from Wellesley College. She credits her physics professor, Phyllis Fleming, with her personal interest in the field, and at her encouragement, took several advanced physics courses at the Massachusetts Institute of Technology. She then earned her Ph.D. in atomic physics in 1983 from the University of California, Berkeley, studying under Eugene Commins.

== Career ==
Drell began her career as a postdoctoral research associate at the Lawrence Berkeley National Laboratory as a member of the Mark-II collaboration.

In 1988, Drell was appointed to the physics faculty at Cornell University and joined the CLEO collaboration working on heavy flavor physics. During her tenure, she was the deputy director of Cornell's Laboratory of Nuclear Studies and served as chair of the Synchrotron Radiation Committee.

In 2002, Drell joined the faculty at Stanford and was appointed associate director, particle and particle astrophysics (then known as research division) at the SLAC National Accelerator Laboratory (then known as the Stanford Linear Accelerator Center), where she oversaw the BaBar experiment. She joined the Fermi Gamma-ray Space Telescope Collaboration and participated in the construction of the Large Area Telescope. She became deputy director of the laboratory in 2005 and in 2007, she was named the fourth director of SLAC, succeeding Jonathan M. Dorfan. She stepped down from the lab director position in 2012 to return to full time research and teaching.

In September 2014, Drell was named dean of the Stanford School of Engineering, the first woman to serve in that role. In February 2017, Drell became the thirteenth provost of Stanford University. Drell stepped down from the Provost role in October 2023.

Drell was a member of Nvidia's board of directors for more than ten years, resigning in 2026.

=== Recognition ===
Drell is a member of the National Academy of Sciences, the American Academy of Arts and Sciences, the German National Academy of Sciences Leopoldina, and a fellow of the American Physical Society and a fellow of the American Association for the Advancement of Science (AAAS). She has been the recipient of a Guggenheim Fellowship and a National Science Foundation Presidential Young Investigator Award.

== Personal life ==
Drell is married to accelerator physicist Jim Welch. They met in a chamber group at Cornell University. The couple has three children.

Academic offices
Preceded by John Etchemendy	Provost of Stanford University; 2017–2023	Succeeded by Jenny Martinez
Preceded by Jonathan M. Dorfan	SLAC Director; Dec 2007 – Dec 2012	Succeeded by Chi-Chang Kao
