= Irell & Manella =

American law firm

- Headquarters: Los Angeles, California, United States
- No. of offices: 3
- No. of attorneys: 70
- Major practice areas: Complex business litigation, IP litigation
- Revenue: ▲253 million USD (2011)
- Date founded: 1941
- Company type: LLP
- Website: irell.com

Irell & Manella LLP is an American law firm founded in 1941 by lawyers Lawrence E. Irell (1912–2000) and Arthur Manella (1917–1997). It has approximately 70 lawyers (down from a high of over 220), and placed 183rd on The American Lawyer's 2021 Am Law 200 ranking. It has two locations in Southern California: Century City and Newport Beach, as well as one in Washington, D.C. Irell specializes in intellectual property litigation and general business litigation.

Morgan Chu, a partner at Irell, is the brother of former United States Secretary of Energy Steven Chu. The firm is governed by an executive committee. Kyle Kawakami is the managing partner of the Newport Beach office. Jane Shay Wald is the head of the trademark practice group. Former federal judge Layn R. Phillips was a longtime partner at the firm.

Former Under Secretary of Commerce for Intellectual Property and Director of the United States Patent and Trademark Office Andrei Iancu rejoined the firm in April 2021.

== Notable Cases ==
Over the course of more than a decade, Irell represented TiVo in its battles against some of the largest media companies, securing victories across multiple district courts, the International Trade Commission and the Federal Circuit, including three trials, numerous trips to the federal circuit and settlements. TiVo collected more than $1.7 billion in damages and settlements from companies like EchoStar, Motorola, Cisco, AT&T and Verizon.

Irell represented City of Hope in a patent licensing dispute with Genentech related to the world's first biotechnology drug. City of Hope subsequently named its graduate school the Irell & Manella Graduate School of Biological Sciences.

In 2020, Irell & Manella represented Labrador Diagnostics (a subsidiary of Fortress Investment Group, itself owned by the firm SoftBank) in an infringement lawsuit against bioFire (a subsidiary of BioMérieux), claiming the firm infringed patents purchased from the disgraced company Theranos. This legal action attracted heavy criticism due both to the origin of the patents, as well as bioFire responding by saying they were working on COVID-19 tests during the COVID-19 pandemic.

Irell achieved a series of significant victories for USAA—a member-owned association that provides financial services to military service members, veterans and their families— in protecting its patented mobile check deposit innovations. In the span of two months in late 2019 and early 2020, these victories included a jury verdict against Wells Fargo of willful infringement and $200 million in damages on one set of patents, and a second jury verdict against Wells Fargo of willful infringement and $102 million in damages on a second set of patents. More recently, Irell represented USAA in a patent infringement suit against Truist Bank asserting infringement of five of USAA's mobile deposit patents, which settled favorably in October 2023.

== See also ==
- Irell & Manella Graduate School of Biological Sciences at City of Hope National Medical Center
