= Li Shu-hua =

Chinese biophysicist and politician (1890–1979)

- 李書華
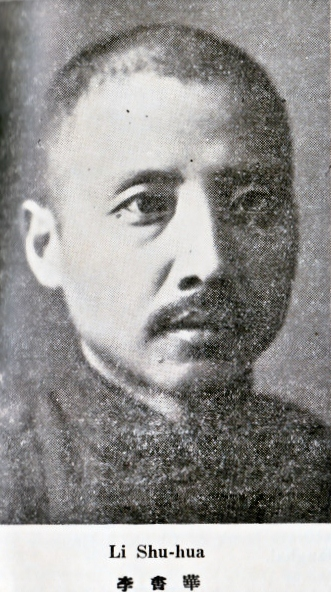
- Li in Who's Who in China 4th ed., published in 1931
- Born: 23 September 1890; Lulong County, Hebei, Qing dynasty
- Died: July 5, 1979 (aged 88); New York City, U.S.
- Education: Universite de Paris; University of Toulouse
- Scientific career
- Fields: Biophysics
- Workplaces: Beijing University; Academia Sinica; Universite de Paris; University of Hamburg

Li Shu-hua (simplified Chinese: 李书华; traditional Chinese: 李書華; pinyin: Lǐ Shūhuá, courtesy name: Runzhang 潤章, 23 September 1890 – 5 July 1979) was a Chinese biophysicist and politician. He was an educator, and administrator at Beijing University and a Chinese diplomat. He was the brother of Li Shu-tien.

He went to France where he earned a doctorate in physics. In 1922 he returned to China where he worked at the Ministry of Education of the Republic of China and at the Academia Sinica.

From 1935 to 1949 he was chairman of the Chinese delegation of the Commission Mixte des Oeuvres Franco-Chinoises. In 1945 he was elected a member of the Central Executive Committee of the Kuomintang and participated in the conference for the founding of the United Nations Educational, Scientific, and Cultural Organization (UNESCO). In 1946, 1947, and 1949 he attended the general conferences of the UNESCO as a Chinese delegate; in 1952 he served as chairman of the Chinese delegation to the Seventh General Conference of UNESCO.

In 1949 he returned to France where he did research work at the Universite de Paris. In the academic year of 1951–52 he taught Chinese language and culture at the University of Hamburg in Germany.

He relocated to New York City in 1953 and died of a heart attack there in 1979.

== Childhood and Education ==
Li Shu-hua was born in Qinhuangdao, Hebei. As a youth he studied Chinese Classics with private tutors. In 1912 he graduated first in his class at Chihli Higher Agricultural School and received a government grant to study in France, where he participated in the Diligent Work-Frugal Study Movement. He studied under a number of renowned professors, among them Nobel laureates Paul Sabatier, Gabriel Lippmann and Marie Curie. He also worked in the lab of Jean Perrin. Li received the certificate of Ingenieur Agricole from the University of Toulouse in 1918, and the degrees Licencie es Sciences Physiques and Docteur es Sciences Physiques from the University of Paris in 1920 and 1922, respectively.

== Politics ==
Three leaders of the Tongmenghui lived as guests in the dormitory of the preparatory school Li attended prior to his studies in France. Once in France Li met and befriended Li Shizeng and Wu Zhihui, two of the fiercely anti-communist "Four Elders" of the Chinese Nationalist Party; Columbia University's Rare Book and Manuscript Library contains multiple volumes of his personal correspondence with them in Chinese. Li admired the President of Peking University (and another of the "Four Elders") Cai Yuanpei:

"President Cai stood for academic freedom. The professors whom he engaged for Peking University ranged from one extreme to the other in political thinking. [...] Li Shizeng advocated the theory of anarchism. President Cai himself believed in the doctrines of Kropotkin. In Peking University Mr. Cai adopted the policy of "university governed by professors". All of the important problems concerning the university were discussed in the [...] Senate of university which was composed of a number of professors elected by and from among all professors."

While Li's first allegiance was to science he also wrote about people, politics, and events. His Reminiscences includes the sections "Wu Chi-hui, Ts'ai Yuan-p'ei, Li Shi-tseng, and Chang Ching-chiang: Their Participation in the Revolution and Their Contributions to China" and "What I know about Li Ta-chao and Ch'en Tu-hsiu and the Early Development of Communism."

Audio recordings of Li's reminiscences (in Chinese) are available online as part of Columbia University's Chinese Oral History project.

== Career ==
Li Shu-hua returned to China in 1922 and served as professor of physics at Peking University until 1930. He served concurrently as the acting president of the University Franco-Chinois in Peking (1926–1928) and then as acting president of Peiping University (1928–1929). In 1929, he became vice president of the National Academy of Peiping, a post he held until the takeover of the Communist Party forced its closing in 1949. Between 1930 and 1931 he concurrently served the Ministry of Education first as vice-minister and then as minister. He became a member of the Research Council, Academia Sinica in 1935 and was its director-general in 1943. He was twice elected chairman of the board of directors of the Chinese Society of Physics, and once of the Chinese Society of Astronomers. He served on the Boards of Directors of the Beijing Natural History Museum and the Beijing National Central Museum and the Peiping Palace Museum. Between 1953 and 1960 he wrote many articles on Chinese invention and discovery in science. He won a research award from the Society of Sigma Xi and the Scientific Research Society in 1958.

In 1926 he was awarded the "Officier de la Legion d' Honneur" by the French Government; in 1949 he was awarded the "Commandeur de la Legion d' Honneur".
