= Philip H. Bucksbaum =

American atomic physicist

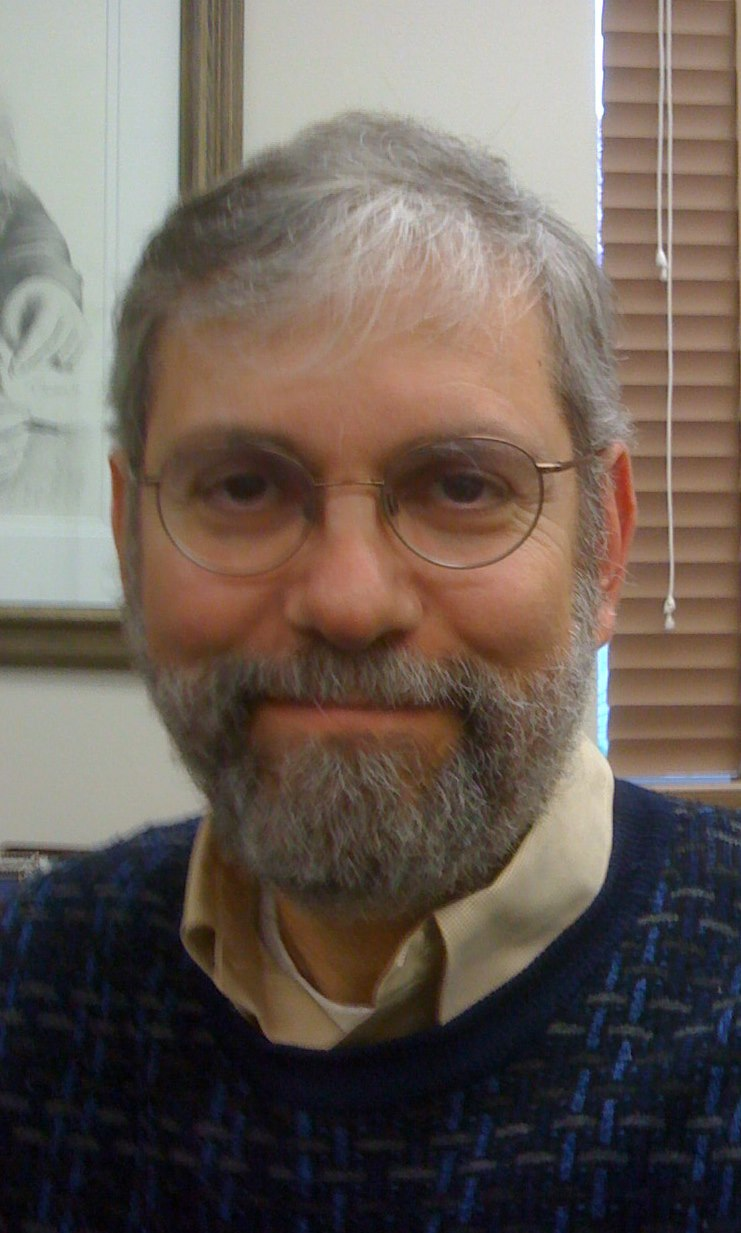
- At Stanford 2009
- Born: January 14, 1953 (age 73); Grinnell, Iowa
- Citizenship: USA
- Education: Harvard University, A.B. 1975 University of California at Berkeley, Ph.D. 1980
- Scientific career
- Fields: Atomic Physics, Ultrafast Science
- Workplaces: Stanford University, SLAC National Accelerator Laboratory
- Thesis: Measurement of the Parity Non-conserving Neutral Weak Interaction in Atomic Thallium (1980)
- Doctoral advisor: Eugene Commins

Philip H. Bucksbaum (born January 14, 1953, in Grinnell, Iowa) is an American atomic physicist, the Marguerite Blake Wilbur Professor in Natural Science in the Departments of Physics, Applied Physics, and Photon Science at Stanford University and the SLAC National Accelerator Laboratory. He also directs the Stanford PULSE Institute.

He is a member of the National Academy of Sciences and a Fellow of the American Academy of Arts and Sciences, the American Physical Society, and the Optical Society, and was elected President of the Optical Society for 2014. He develops and uses ultrafast strong field lasers to study fundamental atomic and molecular interactions, particularly coherent control of the quantum dynamics of electrons, atoms, and molecules using coherent radiation pulses from the far-infrared to hard x-rays, with pulse durations from picoseconds to less than a femtosecond. In 2020, Bucksbaum received the Norman F. Ramsey Prize in Atomic, Molecular and Optical Physics, and in Precision Tests of Fundamental Laws and Symmetries for his pioneering explorations of ultrafast strong field physics from the optical to the X-ray regime.

== Biography ==
=== Early life and education ===
Bucksbaum spent his early childhood in Grinnell, a small farming and college community in south-central Iowa. He graduated as the class valedictorian from Washington High School in Cedar Rapids in 1971. He received a bachelor's degree in Physics from Harvard College in 1975. Bucksbaum attended graduate school at the University of California at Berkeley, receiving his Ph.D. in 1980.

=== Professional career ===
Following a one-year postdoctoral appointment at Lawrence Berkeley Laboratory, Bucksbaum joined Bell Telephone Laboratories, where he remained until Columbia University appointed him Adjunct Associate Professor in Applied Physics in 1989. In 1990 he moved to Ann Arbor, MI to accept a Professorship in Physics at the University of Michigan. He became Otto Laporte Collegiate Professor in Physics in 1997, and Peter Franken University Professor in 2005.

Bucksbaum joined the faculty of Stanford in 2005, with joint appointments in Physics, Applied Physics, and Photon Science. He was named to the Marguerite Blake Wilbur Chair in Natural Science at Stanford in 2009, and currently directs the PULSE Institute at Stanford and SLAC.

=== Research summary ===
Bucksbaum's graduate research at Berkeley was on the parity non-conserving neutral weak interaction in atomic thallium. He co-authored a textbook on the larger subject of electroweak interactions after completing his doctoral thesis.

At Bell Laboratories he became interested in ultrafast and strong field laser-matter interactions. For a time, he co-held the record for the shortest wavelength coherent radiation produced in the laboratory. He was one of the team that used similar methods to develop the first ultrafast angle-resolved vuv photoemission methods. In 1985 he turned to the study of strong-field ionization of atoms. His early work on above threshold ionization of atoms established the role of ponderomotive forces in laser-electron interactions through studies of electron surfing in ultrafast laser pulses as well as the high-intensity Kapitsa–Dirac effect. He also discovered and explained the mechanism of bond softening in strong-field molecular dissociation. His pioneering development of broadband coherent THz radiation (so-called "half-cycle pulses") helped to advance the field of ultrafast THz spectroscopy. He has subsequently used ultrafast lasers to study problems in quantum sculpting, quantum information, and coherent control of atomic and molecular dynamics.

Bucksbaum helped to establish the new field of ultrafast x-ray science in early work at the Advanced Photon Source at Argonne National Laboratory and most recently strong-field coherent x-ray-atom physics at x-ray free-electron lasers.

=== Professional service ===
Bucksbaum served terms on the American Physical Society Executive Board, the Optical Society Board of Directors, and the National Academy of Sciences Board on Physics and Astronomy, as well as its Committee on AMO Science (CAMOS). He chaired its Decal Study in AMO Science, AMO 2010. He has been a member of advisory committees for the Department of Energy Division on Basic Energy Science (BESAC), NIST (Committee for Physics), The National Science Foundation, and Science Advisory Committees for the Advanced Light Source at Berkeley National Lab, the Advanced Photon Source at Argonne National Lab, and the Linac Coherent Light Source at SLAC National Accelerator Lab. As of 2013 he was Chair of the Board on Physics and Astronomy of the National Academy.

He has served on the Editorial Board of Physical Review Letters, and was the founding editor of the American Institute of Physics Virtual Journal of Ultrafast Science. At Stanford and SLAC, he has served as Chair of the Photon Science faculty and Director of the Chemical Science Division.

== Selected published works ==
- Bucksbaum, P.; Bashkansky, M.; Mcilrath, T. (1987). "Scattering of electrons by intense coherent light". Physical Review Letters. 58 (4): 349–352. Bibcode:1987PhRvL..58..349B. doi:10.1103/physrevlett.58.349. PMID 10034911.
- Weinacht, T.; Ahn, J.; Bucksbaum, P. (1999). "Controlling the shape of a quantum wavefunction". Nature. 397 (6716): 233–235. Bibcode:1999Natur.397..233W. doi:10.1038/16654. hdl:2027.42/62625. S2CID 204990713.
- Bucksbaum, P.; Zavriyev, A.; Muller, H.; Schumacher, D. (1990). "Softening of the H2+ molecular bond in intense laser fields". Physical Review Letters. 64 (16): 1883–1886. Bibcode:1990PhRvL..64.1883B. doi:10.1103/physrevlett.64.1883. PMID 10041519.
- Information storage and retrieval through quantum phase, Ahn J., T. Weinacht & P. Bucksbaum, 2000. Science, 287, 463–465.
- Cavalieri, A.; Fritz, D.; Lee, S.; Bucksbaum, P.; Reis, D.; Rudati, J.; Mills, D.; Fuoss, P. H.; Stephenson, G.; Kao, C.; Siddons, D.; Lowney, D.; Macphee, A.; Weinstein, D.; Falcone, R.; Pahl, R.; Als-Nielsen, J.; Blome, C.; Dusterer, S.; Ischebeck, R.; Schlarb, H.; Schulte-Schrepping, H.; Tschentscher, T.; Schneider, J.; Hignette, O.; Sette, F.; Sokolowski-Tinten, K.; Chapman, H.; Lee, R.; Hansen, T.; Synnergren, O.; Larsson, J.; Techert, S.; Sheppard, J.; Wark, J.; Bergh, M.; Caleman, C.; Huldt, G.; Der Spoel, D. Van; Timneanu, N.; Hajdu, J.; Akre, R.; Bong, E.; Emma, P.; Krejcik, P.; Arthur, J.; Brennan, S.; Gaffney, K.; Lindenberg, A.; Luening, K.; Hastings, J. (2005). "Clocking femtosecond x rays". Physical Review Letters. 94 (11) 114801. Bibcode:2005PhRvL..94k4801C. doi:10.1103/PhysRevLett.94.114801. hdl:11858/00-001M-0000-0028-5A7E-3. PMID 15903864.
- Freeman, R.; Bucksbaum, P.; Milchberg, H.; Darac, S.; Schumacher, D.; Geusic, M. (1987). "Above-threshold ionization with subpicosecond laser pulses". Physical Review Letters. 59 (10): 1092–1095. Bibcode:1987PhRvL..59.1092F. doi:10.1103/physrevlett.59.1092. PMID 10035138.
- Jones, R.; You, D.; Bucksbaum, P. (1993). "abstract Ionization or Rydberg atoms by subpicosecond half-cycle electromagnetic pulses". Physical Review Letters. 70 (9): 1236–1239. doi:10.1103/physrevlett.70.1236. PMID 10054325.
- Reis, D.; Decamp, M.; Bucksbaum, P.; Clarke, R.; Dufresne, E.; Hertlein, M.; Merlin, R.; Falcone, R.; Kapteyn, H.; Murnane, M.; Larsson, J.; Missalla, T.; Wark, J. (2001). "Probing impulsive strain propagation with x-ray pulses". Physical Review Letters. 86 (14): 3072–3075. arXiv:cond-mat/0102179. Bibcode:2001PhRvL..86.3072R. doi:10.1103/physrevlett.86.3072. PMID 11290110. S2CID 16512942.
- Schumacher, D.; Weihe, F.; Muller, H.; Bucksbaum, P. (1994). "Phase dependence of intense field ionization – a study using 2 colors". Physical Review Letters. 73 (10): 1344–1347. Bibcode:1994PhRvL..73.1344S. doi:10.1103/physrevlett.73.1344. PMID 10056769.
- Weinacht, T.; Ahn, J.; Bucksbaum, P. (1998). "Measurement of the amplitude and phase of a sculpted Rydberg wave packet". Physical Review Letters. 80 (25): 5508–5511. Bibcode:1998PhRvL..80.5508W. doi:10.1103/physrevlett.80.5508.

== Bibliography ==
- Schouten, Katherine. At Home in the Heartland: A Bucksbaum Family Album. Chicago: History Works, 2007. Print.
- The Class of '75: Reflections on the Last Quarter of the 20th Century by Harvard Graduates. New York: New, 2003. Print.
- Philip Bucksbaum. The American Institute of Physics. AIP History Center Array of Contemporary Physicists, n.d. Web. 19 May 2013.
